= D-class lifeboat (EA16) =

Inshore lifeboat class of the RNLI

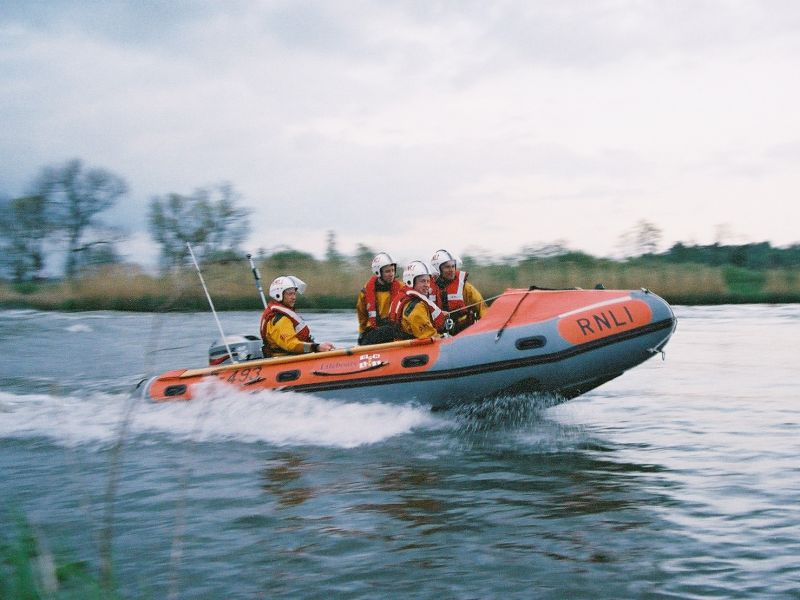
- D-class lifeboat at speed

Class overview
- Name: D-class (EA16)
- Builders: Avon Inflatables
- Operators: Royal National Lifeboat Institution
- Preceded by: D-class (Zodiac III)
- Succeeded by: D-class (IB1)
- Built: 1987–2002
- In service: 1987–2010
- Completed: 243

General characteristics
- Class & type: Evans Avon 16
- Displacement: 338 kg (745 lb)
- Length: 4.9 m (16 ft)
- Beam: 2 m (6.6 ft)
- Propulsion: 1 × 40 hp Mariner outboard engine
- Speed: 20 knots (23 mph; 37 km/h)
- Endurance: 3 hours at full speed
- Complement: 3 or 4

The D-class (EA16) lifeboat is a class of inflatable boat operated since 1987 by the Royal National Lifeboat Institution of the United Kingdom and Ireland. It has been replaced operationally by the D-class (IB1), but many are still used as part of the relief fleet, as boarding boats for the larger classes of lifeboat and by the RNLI Flood Rescue Team.

The type designator EA16 stands for Evans Avon 16.

== Utilization ==
For more than 60 years the D-class has served as the workhorse of the RNLI Inshore Lifeboat (ILB) fleet. The D-class is one of the few RNLI types not to feature a rigid hull. The D-class was specifically designed as a light and highly manoeuvrable rapid response craft, especially suited to close shore work.

== Design and construction ==
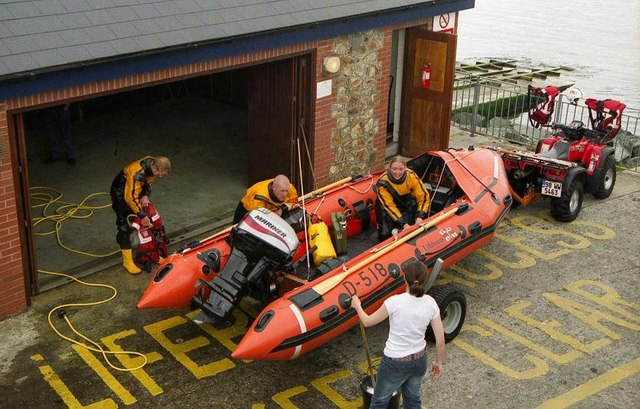
RNLB Inbhear Deas (D-518), which is now part of the Flood Rescue team.

The D-class lifeboat consists of two sponsons, together housing seven inflatable segments intersected by baffles. The main construction fabric is Hypalon-coated Nylon which provides a durable, non-tear surface.

This was one of the smaller classes of lifeboat operated by the RNLI, and they were a common sight at lifeboat stations around the coast. Unlike other members of the ILB fleet, the D-class does not have a rigid hull; all others, with the exception of the Arancia, hovercraft, and ALB Tenders, are Rigid Inflatable Boats (RIBs).

The D-class normally had a crew of three or four and was primarily used for surfer/swimmer incidents as well as assisting in cliff incidents where the casualty was near the water. The very nature of its work required a swift response, and the D-class can normally be afloat within five minutes of the pagers going off.

All of the following fleet details are referenced to the 2026 Lifeboat Enthusiast Society Handbook, with information retrieved directly from RNLI records.

== Fleet ==
=== D-311 - D-399 ===
Op. No. (Note: Op. No. is the RNLI's Operational Number of the boat.)	Name	In service	Principal Station	Comments
D-311	The Holgate	1984–1986	Trials	EA16 Prototype
D-311	The Holgate	1986–1997	Relief fleet	EA16 Prototype
D-311	The Holgate	1997–1999	Inshore Lifeboat Centre	EA16 Prototype
D-315	Charlie B	1986–1993	Tenby	
D-315	Charlie B	1993–1996	Relief fleet	
D-315	Charlie B	1996–2010	Publicity	
D-316	Unnamed	1986–1993	Morecambe	
D-316	Unnamed	1993–1996	Training fleet	
D-316	Unnamed	1996–????	Publicity	
D-317	Unnamed	1986–1993	Dún Laoghaire	
D-317	Unnamed	1994–1996	Training fleet	
D-317	Unnamed	1996–????	Publicity	
D-318	Modeller 1	1986–1993	Barrow	
D-318	Modeller 1	1993–????	Publicity	
D-319	Unnamed	1986–1994	The Mumbles	
D-319	Unnamed	1994–1995	Training fleet	
D-319	Unnamed	1995–????	Publicity	
D-320	Filey Lion	1986–1993	Filey	
D-320	Filey Lion	1993–1994	Relief fleet	
D-320	Filey Lion	1994–????	Training fleet	
D-321	Rose Elizabeth Lawrence	1986–1993	Amble	
D-321	Rose Elizabeth Lawrence	1993–1995	Relief fleet	
D-321	Rose Elizabeth Lawrence	1995	Boarding Boat	
D-321	Rose Elizabeth Lawrence	1995–1996	Relief fleet	
D-321	Rose Elizabeth Lawrence	1997–????	Publicity	
D-322	Humphrey and Nora Tollemanche	1986–1993	Eastbourne	
D-322	Humphrey and Nora Tollemanche	1993–1995	Relief fleet	
D-322	Humphrey and Nora Tollemanche	1995–1998	Publicity	
D-323	Gus	1986–1994	Port St Mary	
D-323	Gus	1995–1998	Publicity	
D-324	BBC Radio Newcastle II	1987–1994	Blyth	
D-324	BBC Radio Newcastle II	1994–1995	Relief fleet	
D-324	BBC Radio Newcastle II	1995–????	Publicity	
D-325	Tricentrol II	1987–1994	Cleethorpes	
D-325	Tricentrol II	1994–1995	Relief fleet	
D-325P	Tricentrol II	1995–2014	Publicity	
D-326	Michel Philippe Wolvers	1987–1994	Skegness	
D-326	Michel Philippe Wolvers	1994–1995	Larne	
D-326	Michel Philippe Wolvers	1995–????	Publicity	
D-327	Unnamed	1987–1994	Happisburgh	
D-327	Unnamed	1995–????	Publicity	
D-328	Stephen Willoughby	1987–1991	Relief fleet	
D-328	Stephen Willoughby	1991–1997	Training fleet	
D-329	BBC Radio Newcastle I	1987–1994	Sunderland	
D-329	BBC Radio Newcastle I	1994–????	Publicity	
D-330	Unnamed	1987–1994	Arbroath	
D-330	Unnamed	1995–????	Publicity	
D-331	Dorothy Way	1987–1994	Burry Port	
D-331	Dorothy Way	1996–????	Publicity	
D-332	Unnamed	1987–1994	West Kirby	
D-332P	Unnamed	1995–????	Publicity	
D-333	Unnamed	1987–1990	Relief fleet	
D-333	Unnamed	1990	Courtown	
D-333	Unnamed	1991–1994	Relief fleet	
D-333	Unnamed	1994	Newcastle	
D-333	Unnamed	1995–1998	Relief fleet	
D-333	Unnamed	1998–2009	Boarding Boat	
D-334	Unnamed	1987–1991	Relief fleet	
D-334	Unnamed	1991	Ilfracombe	
D-334	Unnamed	1991–1996	Relief fleet	
D-334	Unnamed	1997	Publicity	
D-335	Unnamed	1987–1997	Burnham-on-Crouch	
D-336	Unnamed	1987–1994	Relief fleet	
D-336	Unnamed	1994–1996	Angle	
D-336	Unnamed	1996	Relief fleet	
D-336	Unnamed	1997–????	Publicity	
D-337	Norman Victor Hickling	1987–1993	Crimdon Dene	
D-337	Norman Victor Hickling	1993–1996	Relief fleet	
D-337	Norman Victor Hickling	1997–????	Publicity	
D-338	Bruce's Bonus	1987–1996	Relief fleet	
D-338P	Bruce's Bonus	1996–2013	Publicity	
D-339	Unnamed	1987–1995	New Quay	
D-339	Unnamed	1995	St Ives	
D-339	Unnamed	1996	Boarding Boat	
D-339P	Unnamed	1996–2008	Publicity	
D-343	Unnamed	1987–1995	Bude (Note: The Op. No. of Boarding boats is changed from D- to BB-)	
D-343	Unnamed	1996–1997	Inshore Lifeboat Centre	
BB-343	Unnamed	1998–????	Boarding boat (Rosslare Harbour)	
D-344	Onslaught	1987–1995	Borth	
D-344	Onslaught	1995–1996	Relief fleet	
D-344	Onslaught	1996–1997	Inshore Lifeboat Centre	
BB-344	Onslaught	1997–2012	Boarding boat	
D-345	Unnamed	1987–1994	Tighnabruaich	
D-345	Unnamed	1994–1995	Relief fleet	
D-345	Unnamed	1995–1998	Inshore Lifeboat Centre	
BB-345	Unnamed	1998–2008	Boarding boat	
D-346	Unnamed	1987–1995	Conwy	
BB-346	Unnamed	1995–2008	Boarding boat	
RRU-10	Unnamed	2008–2009	Flood Rescue	
D-347	Unnamed	1987–1995	Little and Broad Haven	
D-347	Unnamed	1995–1996	Relief fleet	
D-347	Unnamed	1996–1998	Inshore Lifeboat Centre	
D-348	Banks' Staff I	1987–1995	Rhyl	
D-348	Banks' Staff I	1995–1996	Relief fleet	
D-348	Banks' Staff I	1996–1997	Inshore Lifeboat Centre	
BB-348	Banks' Staff I	1997–2000	Boarding boat	
D-349	Unnamed	1987–1995	Southend-on-Sea	
D-349	Unnamed	1995–1996	Relief fleet	
D-349	Unnamed	1996–1997	Inshore Lifeboat Centre	
BB-349	Unnamed	1997–1998	Boarding boat	
D-350	Unnamed	1987–1994	Relief fleet	
D-350	Unnamed	1994–1995	Rock	
D-350	Unnamed	1995–1997	Relief fleet	
D-351	Rotary Club of Sutton	1987–1995	Shoreham Harbour	
D-351	Rotary Club of Sutton	1995–1997	Relief fleet	
D-351	Rotary Club of Sutton	1997–1998	Inshore Lifeboat Centre	
D-352	Jane Ann	1987–1996	Wells-next-the-Sea	
D-353	Unnamed	1987–1996	Bembridge	
D-353	Unnamed	1996–1997	Relief fleet	
D-354	Alfred George Martin	1988–1996	Torbay	
D-354	Alfred George Martin	1996–1997	Relief fleet	
D-355	Unnamed	1988–1992	Relief fleet	
D-355	Unnamed	1992–1993	Looe	
D-355	Unnamed	1993–1997	Relief fleet	
D-355	Unnamed	1997–1998	Inshore Lifeboat Centre	
D-356	Unnamed	1988–1996	Lough Swilly	
D-356	Unnamed	1996–1997	Relief fleet	
D-357	Braemar	1988–1996	Mablethorpe	
D-357	Braemar	1996–1997	Relief fleet	
D-357P	Braemar	1998–2009	Publicity	
D-358	Unnamed	1988–1996	Holyhead	
D-358	Unnamed	1996–1997	Relief fleet	
D-359	41 Club I	1988–1996	Llandudno	
D-359	41 Club I	1996–????	Relief fleet	
D-360	Unnamed	1988–1996	Lytham St Annes	
D-360	Unnamed	1996–1998	Relief fleet	
D-360P	Unnamed	1998–????	Publicity	
D-361	Tangent I	1988–1996	Flint	
D-361	Tangent I	1996–1997	Relief fleet	
D-361	Tangent I	1997–????	Training fleet	
D-362	Kensington Rescuer	1988–1996	Sheerness	
D-362	Kensington Rescuer	1996–1997	Relief fleet	
D-362	Kensington Rescuer	1997–2005	Inshore Lifeboat Centre	
D-362	Kensington Rescuer	2005–2010	Training fleet	
D-363	Unnamed	1988–1997	Walmer	
D-363	Unnamed	1997	Relief fleet	
D-364	Clubs of the River Exe	1988–1997	Exmouth	
D-364	Clubs of the River Exe	1997–1999	Relief fleet	
D-365	Unnamed	1988–1994	Relief fleet	
D-365	Unnamed	1994	Sennen Cove	
D-365	Unnamed	1994–1997	Relief fleet	
D-365	Unnamed	1997–2005	Inshore Lifeboat Centre	
D-365	Unnamed	2005–2007	Training fleet	
D-366	Peter and Mollie Tabor	1988–1997	Port Isaac	
D-366	Peter and Mollie Tabor	1997–1998	Inshore Lifeboat Centre	
D-366	Peter and Mollie Tabor	1998–1999	Port Isaac	
D-366	Peter and Mollie Tabor	1999–2000	Inshore Lifeboat Centre	
D-367	Sea Horse	1988–1996	Trearddur Bay	
D-367	Sea Horse	1996–1997	Relief fleet	
D-367	Sea Horse	1997–2012	Inshore Lifeboat Centre	
D-368	Douglas Cameron	1988–1997	Southend-on-Sea	
D-368	Douglas Cameron	1997–1998	Relief fleet	
D-368	Douglas Cameron	1998–2005	Inshore Lifeboat Centre	
D-368	Douglas Cameron	2005–2009	Training fleet	
D-368	Douglas Cameron	2009–2014	Inshore Lifeboat Centre	
D-369	Unnamed	1988–1997	Whitby	
D-369	Unnamed	1997–1998	St Davids	
D-369	Unnamed	1998–1999	Relief fleet	
D-369P	Unnamed	1999–2020	Publicity	
D-370	41 Club II	1988–1999	Kippford	
D-371	41 Club III	1988–1999	Relief fleet	
D-371	41 Club III	1999–2000	Inshore Lifeboat Centre	
D-372	The Lion	1988–1997	Pwllheli	
BB-372	The Lion	1998–2010	Boarding boat	
D-373	Unnamed	1988–1997	Redcar	
D-373	Unnamed	1997–1999	Relief fleet	
D-373	Unnamed	1999–2020	Inshore Lifeboat Centre	
D-374	Unnamed	1988–1997	Barmouth	
D-374	Unnamed	1997–1998	Inshore Lifeboat Centre	
D-374	Unnamed	1998–2010	Training fleet	
D-375	Alice	1988–1996	Tramore	
D-375	Alice	1996–2005	Relief fleet	
D-376	Unnamed	1988–1997	Aldeburgh	
D-376	Unnamed	1997–1999	Relief fleet	
D-376	Unnamed	1999–2001	Inshore Lifeboat Centre	
D-377	Unnamed	1988–1997	North Sunderland	
D-377	Unnamed	1997–2000	Inshore Lifeboat Centre	
D-378	Unnamed	1988–1993	Relief fleet	
D-378	Unnamed	1993–1994	Portrush	
D-378	Unnamed	1994–1997	Relief fleet	
D-378	Unnamed	1997–1998	Fethard	
D-378	Unnamed	1998–2000	Relief fleet	
D-379	Unnamed	1989–1998	Howth	
D-379	Unnamed	1998–2001	Relief fleet	
D-380	Unnamed	1988–1997	Horton and Port Eynon	
D-380	Unnamed	1997–1999	Relief fleet	
D-381	Douglas	1989–1998	Moelfre	
D-381	Douglas	1998–1999	Relief fleet	
D-382	Unnamed	1989–1998	Selsey	
D-382	Unnamed	1998–1999	Relief fleet	
D-383	Sea Tiger	1989–1999	Relief fleet	
D-384	John Cresswell	1989–1998	Penarth	
D-384	John Cresswell	1989–1999	Relief fleet	
D-385	Unnamed	1989–1998	Tynemouth	
D-385	Unnamed	1998–????	Relief fleet	
D-386	Trevor Edwin Jones	1989–1998	Aberdeen	
D-386	Trevor Edwin Jones	1998–1999	Relief fleet	
D-387	Boto-X 87	1989–1998	Weston-super-Mare	
D-387	Boto-X 87	1998–1999	Relief fleet	
D-388	Crusader	1989–1998	Stranraer	
D-388	Crusader	1998–1999	Relief fleet	
D-389	Captain Colin	1989–1998	Broughty Ferry	
D-389	Captain Colin	1998–2005	Inshore Lifeboat Centre	
D-389	Captain Colin	2005–2011	Training fleet	
D-390	Tiger D	1989–1996	Porthcawl	
D-390	Tiger D	1996–1997	Fowey	
D-390	Tiger D	1997–1999	Relief fleet	
D-391	Lifeline	1989–1999	Relief fleet	
D-391	Lifeline	1999–2015	Inshore Lifeboat Centre (Capsize Training)	
D-392	Cecile Rampton	1989–1998	Hastings	Now Curlew with Razorbill RIB Charters
D-392	Cecile Rampton	1998–2005	Inshore Lifeboat Centre	Now Curlew with Razorbill RIB Charters
D-392	Cecile Rampton	2005–????	Training fleet	Now Curlew with Razorbill RIB Charters
D-393	Helen Mitchell Scrimgeour	1990–1997	Skerries	
D-393	Helen Mitchell Scrimgeour	1997–1998	Relief fleet	
D-393	Helen Mitchell Scrimgeour	1998–1999	Inshore Lifeboat Centre	
D-394	Banks' Staff II	1990–1999	Withernsea	
D-394P	Banks' Staff II	1999–2008	Publicity	
D-395	Bob	1990–1999	Craster	
D-395	Bob	1999–2001	Relief fleet	
D-396	Unnamed	1989–1993	Relief fleet	
D-396	Unnamed	1993–1994	North Kessock	
D-396	Starting Point	1994	Looe	
D-396	Starting Point	1994–1999	Relief fleet	
D-397	Banks' Staff III	1989–1999	Dunbar	
D-397	Banks' Staff III	1999	Relief fleet	
D-398	Victory Wheelers	1989–1994	Relief fleet	
D-398	Victory Wheelers	1994	Montrose	
D-398	Victory Wheelers	1995–1996	Hayling Island	
D-398	Victory Wheelers	1996–1999	Relief fleet	
D-399	Bertha	1989–1992	Relief fleet	
D-399	Bertha	1992	Campbeltown	
D-399	Bertha	1993–1999	Relief fleet	

=== D400 - D-499 ===
Op. No.	Name	In service	Principal Station	Comments
D-400	Tigger	1989–1999	Margate	
D-401	Bank Staff Appeal IV	1990–2001	Relief fleet	
D-402	Warwick	1990–1999	Port Talbot	
D-402	Warwick	1999–2000	Relief fleet	
D-403	City of Peterborough	1990–1993	Relief fleet	
D-403	City of Peterborough	1993–1994	Campbeltown	
D-403	City of Peterborough	1994–2000	Relief fleet	
D-404	Ann Speed	1990–1999	Relief fleet	
D-404	Ann Speed	1999–2000	Fenit	
D-405	British Diver III	1990–1993	Relief fleet	
D-405	British Diver III	1993–1994	Looe	
D-405	British Diver III	1994–1999	Relief fleet	
D-406	Phyl Clare	1990–1993	Relief fleet	
D-406	Phyl Clare	1993–1994	Swanage	
D-406	Phyl Clare	1995–1996	Newquay	
D-406	Phyl Clare	1996–1997	Relief fleet	
D-406	Phyl Clare	1997	St Davids	
D-406	Phyl Clare	1997–2001	Relief fleet	
D-407	The Marlborough Club Didcot	1990–2002	Relief fleet	
D-407	The Marlborough Club Didcot	2002	Dunbar	
D-407	The Marlborough Club Didcot	2002–2003	Relief fleet	
D-407	The Marlborough Club Didcot	2003	Calshot	
D-407	The Marlborough Club Didcot	2003–2005	Relief fleet	
D-407	The Marlborough Club Didcot	2005–2008	Training fleet	
D-408	City of Derby	1990–2001	Relief fleet	
D-408	City of Derby	2001–2004	Inshore Lifeboat Centre	
D-409	Taipan	1990–2000	Relief fleet	
D-410	Bacchus	1991–1997	Relief fleet	
D-410	Bacchus	1997–1999	Alderney	
D-410	Bacchus	1999–2002	Relief fleet	
D-410	Bacchus	2002–2005	Inshore Lifeboat Centre	
D-410P	Bacchus	2005–2020	Publicity	
D-411	Unnamed	1991–1999	Marazion	
D-411	Unnamed	1999–2000	Relief fleet	
D-411	Unnamed	2000–2001	Marazion	
D-411	Unnamed	2001–2004	Relief fleet	
D-412	BP Service	1991–1999	Courtown	
D-412	BP Service	1999–2006	Relief fleet	
D-413	Billy Mills and George Ralph	1991–2001	Relief fleet	
D-413P	Billy Mills and George Ralph	2001–2010	Publicity	
D-414	Fairlands Lady	1991–2005	Relief fleet	
D-414	Fairlands Lady	2005–2013	Training fleet	
D-415	Pride of West Kingsdown	1991–1995	Relief fleet	
D-415	Pride of West Kingsdown	1995	Fishguard	
D-415	Pride of West Kingsdown	1995–2001	Relief fleet	
D-415	Pride of West Kingsdown	2001–2004	Inshore Lifeboat Centre	
RRU-13	Pride of West Kingsdown	2005–2008	Flood Rescue	
D-415	Pride of West Kingsdown	2008–2009	Training fleet	
D-416	Unnamed	1991–2000	Relief fleet	
D-416	Unnamed	2000–2004	Inshore Lifeboat Centre	
D-417	Douglas Hurndall	1991–1994	Relief fleet	
D-417	Douglas Hurndall	1994–1995	Swanage	
D-417	Douglas Hurndall	1995–2001	Relief fleet	
D-417	Douglas Hurndall	2001–2004	Inshore Lifeboat Centre	
D-418	Unnamed	1991–2002	Relief fleet	
D-418	Unnamed	2002–2003	Calshot	
D-418	Unnamed	2003–2004	Relief fleet	
D-419	Sarah Helena	1991–2005	Relief fleet	
RRU-14	Sarah Helena	2005–2009	Flood Rescue	
D-420	Leslie D	1992–1999	Minehead	
D-420	Leslie D	1999–2000	Relief fleet	
D-420	Leslie D	2000–2005	Inshore Lifeboat Centre	
RRU-15	Leslie D	2005–2009	Flood Rescue	
D-421	Lord Raglan	1992–2000	Portsmouth	
D-421	Lord Raglan	2000–2004	Relief fleet	
D-421	Lord Raglan	2004–2007	Inshore Lifeboat Centre	
D-422	Alec Dykes	1992–2000	Ilfracombe	
D-422	Alec Dykes	2000–2004	Relief fleet	
D-422	Alec Dykes	2004	Bude	
D-422	Alec Dykes	2004–2005	Relief fleet	
RRU-16	Alec Dykes	2005–2009	Flood Rescue	
D-423	John Edmunds	1992–2005	Relief fleet	
D-423	John Edmunds	2005–2010	Training fleet (Capsize Training)	
D-424	City of Chester	1992–2000	Fleetwood	
D-424	City of Chester	2000–2003	Relief fleet	
D-424	City of Chester	2003–2004	Burnham-on-Sea	
D-425	Strickson	1992–2005	Relief fleet	
RRU-17	Strickson	2005–????	Flood Rescue	
D-426	Lord Feoffees II	1992–2000	Bridlington	
D-426	Lord Feoffees II	2000–2002	Relief fleet	
D-426	Lord Feoffees II	2002–2004	Wexford	
D-426	Lord Feoffees II	2004–2005	Training fleet	
D-427	Storrs	1992–1998	Relief fleet	
D-427	Storrs	1998–1999	Sligo Bay	
D-427	Storrs	1999–2004	Relief fleet	
D-428	St Vincent Amazon	1992–1997	Relief fleet	
D-428	St Vincent Amazon	1997	Whitby	
D-428	St Vincent Amazon	1997–2004	Relief fleet	
D-429	RJM	1992–2000	Blackpool	
D-429	RJM	2000–2001	Relief fleet	
D-429	RJM	2001–2002	Calshot	
D-429	RJM	2002–2005	Relief fleet	
RRU-18	RJM	2005–2007	Flood Rescue	
D-430	Rotherham Grammar School	1992–2005	Relief fleet	
D-430P	Rotherham Grammar School	2005–2009	Publicity	
D-431	Veronica	1992–2000	Clacton-on-Sea	
D-431	Veronica	2000–2003	Relief fleet	
D-431	Veronica	2003–2004	Littlehampton	
D-431	Veronica	2004–2012	Training fleet	
D-432	Ordnance Survey Bosun	1992–1995	Relief fleet	
D-432	Ordnance Survey Bosun	1995–1997	Wicklow	
D-432	Ordnance Survey Bosun	1997–2004	Relief fleet	
D-433	Marjorie	1992–1995	Relief fleet	
D-433	Marjorie	1995–1996	Berwick-upon-Tweed	
D-433	Marjorie	1996–2002	Relief fleet	
D-433	Marjorie	2002–2003	Littlehampton	
D-433	Marjorie	2003–2006	Relief fleet	
D-434	John Wesley Hillard	1992–2001	Scarborough	
D-434	John Wesley Hillard	2001–2005	Relief fleet	
D-435	Table 32	1992–1994	Relief fleet	
D-435	Table 32	1994–1996	Shoreham Harbour	
D-435	Table 32	1996–2001	Relief fleet	
D-435	Table 32	2001–2005	Inshore Lifeboat Centre	
D-436	Chloe	1992–2001	Cromer	
D-436	Chloe	2001–2003	Relief fleet	
D-436	Chloe	2003	Eastbourne	
D-436	Chloe	2003–2006	Relief fleet	
D-436	Chloe	2006–2012	Training fleet	
D-437	Jill Gatti	1993–2004	Relief fleet	
D-437	Jill Gatti	2005–2016	Southport Offshore Rescue Trust	
D-438	Arthur and Georgina Stanley Taylor	1993–2001	Tenby	
D-438	Arthur and Georgina Stanley Taylor	2001–2004	South Broads	
D-439	Phyllis Mary	1993–1995	Relief fleet	
D-439	Phyllis Mary	1995	Montrose	
D-439	Phyllis Mary	1995–1996	Larne	
D-439	Phyllis Mary	1996–2005	Relief fleet	
D-440	Brenda Reed	1993–2001	Morecambe	
D-440	Brenda Reed	2001–2002	Relief fleet	
D-440	Brenda Reed	2002–2004	Trearddur Bay	
D-440	Brenda Reed	2004	Relief fleet	
D-441	Irish Diver	1993–2001	Dún Laoghaire	
D-441	Irish Diver	2001–2002	Trearddur Bay	
D-441	Irish Diver	2002–2009	Relief fleet	
D-442	Edgar Law	1993–2001	Blackpool	
D-442	Edgar Law	2001–2005	Relief fleet	
D-443	Modeller II	1993–2001	Barrow	2005, Sold to ICESAR
D-443	Modeller II	2001–2005	Relief fleet	2005, Sold to ICESAR
D-443	–	????	Suðurnes	
D-444	Sharpe's Classic All Seasons	1994–2006	Relief fleet	
BB-444	Sharpe's Classic All Seasons	2006–2016	Boarding boat (St Mary's)	
D-445	Axa Life Inshorer	1993–1996	Relief fleet	
D-445	Axa Life Inshorer	1996–1997	Fethard	
D-445	Axa Life Inshorer	1997–2005	Relief fleet	
D-446	Holme Team	1993–2001	Filey	
D-446	Holme Team	2001–2006	Relief fleet	
D-446	Holme Team	2006–2010	Training fleet	
D-447	Thomas Campbell	1993–2001	Amble	
D-447	Thomas Campbell	2001–2004	Relief fleet	
D-447	Thomas Campbell	2004–2005	Wexford	
D-447	Thomas Campbell	2005–2006	Relief fleet	
BB-447	Thomas Campbell	2006–2013	Boarding boat (Barry Dock)	
D-448	Sea Ranger	1993–1995	Relief fleet	
D-448	Sea Ranger	1995–1996	Sennen Cove	
D-448	Sea Ranger	1996–1997	Relief fleet	
D-448	Sea Ranger	1997–1998	Horton and Port Eynon	
D-448	Sea Ranger	1998–2004	Relief fleet	
D-449	Humphry and Nora Tollemache II	1993–2001	Eastbourne	
D-449	Humphry and Nora Tollemache II	2001–2004	Relief fleet	
D-449	Humphry and Nora Tollemache II	2004–2005	South Broads	
D-450	Anthony	1993–1994	Relief fleet	
D-450	Anthony	1994–1995	Sennen Cove	
D-450	Anthony	1995–2006	Relief fleet	
D-450	Anthony	2006–2009	Training fleet	
BB-450	Anthony	2009–2014	Boarding boat	
D-451	Jeanne Frances	1993–2006	Relief fleet	
D-452	Blue Peter III	1994–2003	North Berwick	
D-452	Blue Peter III	2003–2005	Relief fleet	
D-453	Blue Peter IV	1994–2004	St Agnes	
D-453	Blue Peter IV	2005–2006	Inshore Lifeboat Centre	
D-454	Blue Peter VI	1994–2004	Cleethorpes	
D-454	Blue Peter VI	2004–2005	Relief fleet	
D-455	Spirit of Kintyre	1994–2001	Campbeltown	
D-455	Spirit of Kintyre	2001–2006	Relief fleet	
D-456	Jonathan Simpson	1994–2002	Portrush	
D-456	Jonathan Simpson	2002–2006	Relief fleet	
D-457	Elsie Frances I	1994–2006	Relief fleet	
BB-457	Elsie Frances I	2006–2017	Boarding boat (Barrow)	
D-458	Maureen Samuels	1994–2004	Relief fleet	In private ownership, West Bay, Dorset, April 2026
D-458	Maureen Samuels	2004	Littlehampton	In private ownership, West Bay, Dorset, April 2026
D-458	Maureen Samuels	2004–2006	Relief fleet	In private ownership, West Bay, Dorset, April 2026
D-459	Margaret and Fiona Wood	1994–2001	North Kessock	
D-459	Margaret and Fiona Wood	2001–2003	Relief fleet	
D-459	Margaret and Fiona Wood	2003–2004	The Mumbles	
D-460	Leicester Fox	1994–2002	Skegness	
D-460	Leicester Fox	2002–2003	Relief fleet	
D-460	Leicester Fox	2003–2004	New Quay	
D-460	Leicester Fox	2004–2006	Relief fleet	
BB-460	Leicester Fox	2006–2013	Boarding boat (Dunbar)	
D-461	Spirit of RAOC	1994–2002	Looe	
D-461	Spirit of RAOC	2002–2004	Relief fleet	
D-461	Spirit of RAOC	2004	Workington	
D-461	Spirit of RAOC	2004–2005	Relief fleet	
D-461	Spirit of RAOC	2005–2006	Anstruther	
D-462	Frances	1994–2002	Port St Mary	
D-462	Frances	2002–2006	Relief fleet	
BB-462	Frances	2006–	Boarding boat	
D-463	Nellie Grace Hughes	1994–2004	The Mumbles	On display at from 2006
D-463	Nellie Grace Hughes	2004–2006	Relief fleet	On display at from 2006
D-463	Nellie Grace Hughes	2006–2016	National Maritime Museum Cornwall	On display at from 2006
D-463	Nellie Grace Hughes	2016–2019	Publicity	On display at from 2006
D-464	Wren	1994–2003	Blyth	
D-464	Wren	2003–2006	Relief fleet	
D-465	Palmer Bayer	1994–2006	Relief fleet	
D-465	Palmer Bayer	2006–2007	Training fleet	
D-466	Phyllis Mary II	1994–2004	Relief fleet	
D-466	Phyllis Mary II	2004–2005	St Agnes	
D-466	Phyllis Mary II	2005–2012	Training fleet	
D-467	Kathleen Scadden	1994–1998	Relief fleet	
D-467	Kathleen Scadden	1998–1999	Cardigan	
D-467	Kathleen Scadden	1999–2005	Relief fleet	
D-467	Kathleen Scadden	2005–2006	Troon	
D-467	Kathleen Scadden	2006–2007	Relief fleet	
D-467	Kathleen Scadden	2007–2012	Training fleet	
D-468	Colin Martin	1994–2003	Happisburgh	
D-468	Colin Martin	2003–2004	Relief fleet	
D-468	Colin Martin	2004–2005	Troon	
D-468	Colin Martin	2005–2006	Relief fleet	
D-469	Winifred & Cyril Thorpe	1994–1999	Relief fleet	
D-469	Winifred & Cyril Thorpe	1999	Alderney	
D-469	Winifred & Cyril Thorpe	1999–2002	Relief fleet	
D-469	Winifred & Cyril Thorpe	2002	Wexford	
D-469	Winifred & Cyril Thorpe	2002–2004	Relief fleet	
D-469	Winifred & Cyril Thorpe	2004	Ballyglass	
D-469	Winifred & Cyril Thorpe	2004–2007	Relief fleet	
RRU-14	Winifred & Cyril Thorpe	2007–2009	Flood Rescue	
D-470	Landlubber	1994–2003	Sunderland	Now with ICE SAR
D-470	Landlubber	2003–2006	Relief fleet	Now with ICE SAR
D-470	–	????	Eskifjörður	Now with ICE SAR
D-471	Coachmakers of London	1994–2004	Arbroath	
D-471	Coachmakers of London	2004–2006	Relief fleet	
D-471	Coachmakers of London	2006–2007	Training fleet	
D-472	Kip and Kath	1994–2003	Burry Port	
D-472	Kip and Kath	2003–2006	Relief fleet	
D-472	Kip and Kath	2006–2007	Training fleet	
D-473	Thomas Jefferson	1994–2003	West Kirby	
D-473	Thomas Jefferson	2003–2006	Relief fleet	
D-473	Thomas Jefferson	2006–2010	Training fleet	
D-474	G C H Fox	1994–2002	Relief fleet	
D-474	G C H Fox	2002–2003	Eastbourne	
D-474	G C H Fox	2003–2006	Relief fleet	
D-475	Phyl Clare 2	1995–2003	Swanage	
D-475	Phyl Clare 2	2003–2005	Relief fleet	
D-475	Phyl Clare 2	2006–2007	Training fleet	
D-476	Corydd	1995–2003	New Quay	
D-476	Corydd	2003–2008	Relief fleet	
D-477	Pride of Nuneaton and Bedworth	1995–1999	Relief fleet	
D-477	Pride of Nuneaton and Bedworth	1999–2001	Kippford	
D-477	Pride of Nuneaton and Bedworth	2001–2002	Relief fleet	
D-477	Pride of Nuneaton and Bedworth	2002–2005	Teddington	
D-477	Pride of Nuneaton and Bedworth	2005–2007	Relief fleet	
D-477P	Pride of Nuneaton and Bedworth	2007–2016	Publicity	
BB-477	Pride of Nuneaton and Bedworth	2016–2018	Boarding boat	
D-478	Aldergrove	1995–2005	Newcastle	
D-478	Aldergrove	2005–2007	Relief fleet	
D-479	May	1995–2004	Borth	
D-479	May	2004–2006	Relief fleet	
D-479	May	2006–2007	Training fleet	
D-480	The Craft Club	1995–2007	Relief fleet	
D-481	Holme Team 3	1995–2004	Montrose	
D-481	Holme Team 3	2004–2007	Relief fleet	
D-481P	Holme Team 3	2007–	Publicity	
D-482	Arthur Bate	1995–2004	Conwy	
D-482	Arthur Bate	2004–2005	Angle	
D-482	Arthur Bate	2005–????	Relief fleet	
D-483	C. John Morris DFM	1995–1996	Relief fleet	
D-483	C. John Morris DFM	1996–1997	St Ives	
D-483	C. John Morris DFM	1997–2005	Relief fleet	
D-483	C. John Morris DFM	2005–2006	Flint	
D-483	C. John Morris DFM	2006–2007	Relief fleet	
D-484	Sybil	1995–2004	Little and Broad Haven	
D-484	Sybil	2004–2007	Relief fleet	
D-485	Stafford with Rugeley	1995–2004	Rhyl	
D-485	Stafford with Rugeley	2004–2007	Relief fleet	
D-485P	Stafford with Rugeley	2007–2010	Publicity	
D-486	Eleanor and Catherine	1995–2005	Relief fleet	
D-486	Eleanor and Catherine	2005–2006	South Broads	
D-486	Eleanor and Catherine	2006–2007	Relief fleet	
D-487	Foresters London pride	1995–2005	Southend-on-Sea	
D-487	Foresters London pride	2005–2007	Training fleet	
D-488	Mabel	1995–2000	Relief fleet	
D-488	Mabel	2000–2001	Fenit	
D-488	Mabel	2001–2007	Relief fleet	
D-489	Dolly Holloway	1995–2005	Rock	
D-489	Dolly Holloway	2005–2007	Training fleet	
D-490	Spirit of The ACC	1996–2004	Sennen Cove	
D-490	Spirit of The ACC	2004–2007	Relief fleet	
D-490	Spirit of The ACC	2007	Training fleet	
D-491	Cetrek	1996–2007	Relief fleet	
D-492	Lawnflite	1996–1998	Relief fleet	
D-492	Lawnflite	1998	Cardigan	
D-492	Lawnflite	1998–2002	Relief fleet	
D-492	Lawnflite	2002–2004	Ballyglass	
D-492	Lawnflite	2004–2006	Relief fleet	
D-492	Lawnflite	2006–2007	South Broads	
D-493	Isabella Mary	1996–2004	Angle	
D-493	Isabella Mary	2004–2005	Relief fleet	
D-493	Isabella Mary	2005	South Broads	
D-493	Isabella Mary	2005–2007	Relief fleet	
D-494	Sunrise	1996–2005	Berwick-upon-Tweed	
D-494	Sunrise	2005–2007	Relief fleet	
D-495	Elsie Frances II	1996–2003	Bude	
D-495	Elsie Frances II	2004–2005	Burnham-on-Sea	
D-495	Elsie Frances II	2005–2007	Relief fleet	
D-496	Leonard Stedman	1996–2005	Hayling Island	
D-496	Leonard Stedman	2005–2007	Relief fleet	
D-497	Lord Daresbury	1996–2005	Newquay	
D-497	Lord Daresbury	2005–2007	Relief fleet	
D-498	Fred Crocker	1996–2007	Relief fleet	
BB-498	Fred Crocker	2007–2012	Boarding boat	
D-499	Jean and Paul	1996–2005	Larne	
D-499	Jean and Paul	2005–2007	Relief fleet	

=== D500 - D-576 ===
Op. No.	Name	In service	Station	Comments
D-500	Unnamed	1996–2004	Relief fleet	
D-500	Unnamed	2004–2005	Anstruther	
D-500	Unnamed	2005–2007	Relief fleet	
D-500	Unnamed	2007–2014	Publicity	
D-500	Unnamed	2014–2018	Boarding Boat	
D-501	Forest Row Choir	1996–2005	Shoreham Harbour	
D-501	Forest Row Choir	2005–2007	Relief fleet	
BB-501	Forest Row Choir	2007–2016	Boarding boat (Tynemouth)	
D-502	Inis-Eoghain	1996–2005	Lough Swilly	
D-502	Inis-Eoghain	2005–2009	Relief fleet	
BB-502	Inis-Eoghain	2009–2018	Boarding boat (Appledore)	
D-503	Criddy and Tom	1996–2005	Bembridge	
D-503	Criddy and Tom	2005–2007	Whitby	
D-503	Criddy and Tom	2007–2008	Relief fleet	
BB-503	Criddy and Tom	2008–2015	Boarding boat (Arranmore)	
D-504	Spirit of the RPC	1996–2005	Torbay	
D-504	Spirit of the RPC	2005–2007	Relief fleet	
D-504	Spirit of the RPC	2007	Fethard	
D-504	Spirit of the RPC	2007–2008	Relief fleet	
BB-504	Spirit of the RPC	2008–2010	Boarding boat	
D-505	Arthur Bygraves	1996–2006	Fishguard	
D-505	Arthur Bygraves	2006	Flint	
D-505	Arthur Bygraves	2006–2008	Relief fleet	
D-505	Arthur Bygraves	2008–2012	Training fleet	
D-506	Patrick Rex Moren	1996–2005	Mablethorpe	
D-506	Patrick Rex Moren	2005–2006	Relief fleet	
D-506	Patrick Rex Moren	2006–2007	Troon	
D-506	Patrick Rex Moren	2007–2008	Relief fleet	
BB-506	Patrick Rex Moren	2008–2009	Boarding boat	
D-507	Spirit of Bedworth and Nuneaton	1996–2005	Holyhead	
D-507	Spirit of Bedworth and Nuneaton	2005–2006	Relief fleet	
D-507	Spirit of Bedworth and Nuneaton	2006–2008	Ballyglass	
D-507	Spirit of Bedworth and Nuneaton	2008–2012	Training fleet	
D-508	John Saunderson	1996–2006	Llandudno	
D-508	John Saunderson	2006–2008	Relief fleet	
D-508P	John Saunderson	2008–2020	Publicity	
D-509	John Kennedy	1996–2006	Lytham St Annes	
D-509	John Kennedy	2006–2007	Relief fleet	
BB-509	John Kennedy	2007–2015	Boarding boat	
D-510	Marjorie Helen	1996–2005	Flint	
D-510	Marjorie Helen	2005–2007	Relief fleet	
D-510	Marjorie Helen	2007–2008	Training fleet	
BB-510	Marjorie Helen	2008–2011	Boarding boat	
D-511	Margaret	1996–2005	Tramore	
D-511	Margaret	2005–2007	Relief fleet	
D-511	Margaret	2007	Redcar	
D-511	Margaret	2007–2009	Relief fleet	
BB-511	Margaret	2009–2012	Boarding boat (Calshot)	
D-512	Jane Ann II	1996–2007	Wells-next-the-Sea	
D-512	Jane Ann II	2007	Whitby	
D-512	Jane Ann II	2007–2008	Relief fleet	
BB-512	Jane Ann II	2008–2014	Boarding boat (Achill Island)	
D-513	Seahorse I	1996–2006	Sheerness	
D-513	Seahorse I	2006–2009	Relief fleet	
BB-513	Seahorse I	2009–2019	Boarding boat	
D-514	Lord Kitchener	1997–2006	Walmer	
D-514	Lord Kitchener	2006–2007	Relief fleet	
D-514	Lord Kitchener	2007	Barmouth	
D-514	Lord Kitchener	2007–2010	South Broads	
D-515	Spirit of the RCT	1997–2007	St Ives	
D-515	Spirit of the RCT	2007–2008	Relief fleet	
FR-10	Spirit of the RCT	2008–2013	Flood Rescue	
D-516	Spirit of the Exe	1997–2006	Exmouth	
D-516	Spirit of the Exe	2006–2007	Relief fleet	
D-516	Spirit of the Exe	2007	Redcar	
D-516	Spirit of the Exe	2007–2009	Relief fleet	
FR-19	Spirit of the Exe	2009–2019	Flood Rescue	
D-517	Spirit of the PCS RE	1997–1998	Port Isaac	Wrecked on service, 6 September 1998
D-518	Inbhear Deas	1997–2007	Wicklow	
D-518	Inbhear Deas	2007–2009	Relief fleet	
FR-14	Inbhear Deas	2009–2020	Flood Rescue	
D-519	Ernest and Rose Chapman	1997–2007	Burnham-on-Crouch	
D-519	Ernest and Rose Chapman	2007–2008	Relief fleet	
FR-04	Ernest and Rose Chapman	2008–2015	Flood Rescue	
D-520	Bob Savage	1997–2007	Aldeburgh	
D-520	Bob Savage	2007–2008	Dart	
D-520	Bob Savage	2008–2011	Relief fleet	
TFR-01	Bob Savage	2011–2013	Flood Rescue	
FR-05	Bob Savage	2013–2017	Flood Rescue	
D-521	OEM Stone II	1997–2007	Whitby	
D-521	OEM Stone II	2007–2010	Relief fleet	
FR-01	OEM Stone II	2010–2016	Flood Rescue	
D-522	City of Chester II	1997–2007	Pwllheli	
D-522	City of Chester II	2007–2008	Relief fleet	
D-522	City of Chester II	2008–2009	Skegness	
D-522P	City of Chester II	2009–2016	Publicity	
BB-522	City of Chester II	2016–2021	Boarding boat	
D-523	Peterborough Beer Festival I	1997–2007	Redcar	
D-523	Peterborough Beer Festival I	2007–2008	Relief fleet	
D-523	Peterborough Beer Festival I	2008	Dart	
D-523	Peterborough Beer Festival I	2008–2009	Relief fleet	
D-523	Peterborough Beer Festival I	2009–2010	Fenit	
D-523P	Peterborough Beer Festival I	2010–2017	Publicity	
BB-523	Peterborough Beer Festival I	2017–2020	Boarding boat	
D-524	Pilgrim	1997–2007	Barmouth	
D-524	Pilgrim	2007–2008	Relief fleet	
FR-15	Pilgrim	2008–2020	Flood Rescue	
D-525	Holme Team IV	1998–2007	Clifden	
D-525	Holme Team IV	2007–2008	Relief fleet	
FR-08	Holme Team IV	2008–2014	Flood Rescue	
BB-525	Holme Team IV	2015–2024	Boarding boat	
D-526	Olive Herbert	1997–2007	Fowey	
D-526	Olive Herbert	2007–2009	Relief fleet	
FR-11	Olive Herbert	2009–2020	Flood Rescue	
D-527	Ethel Royal	1997–2007	Southend-on-Sea	
D-527	Ethel Royal	2007–2009	Relief fleet	
D-527C	Ethel Royal	2009–2012	Training fleet	
BB-527	Ethel Royal	2012–2020	Boarding boat (Leverburgh)	
D-528	Arthur Harris	1998–2007	Fethard	
D-528	Arthur Harris	2007–2008	Relief fleet	
D-528	Arthur Harris	2008–2009	Training fleet	
FR-16	Arthur Harris	2009–2020	Flood Rescue	
D-529	Martin John and Ann	1997–2008	North Sunderland	
D-529	Martin John and Ann	2008–2009	Relief fleet	
D-529C	Martin John and Ann	2009–2012	Training fleet	
BB-529	Martin John and Ann	2012–2020	Boarding boat	
D-530	Marguerite Joan Harris	1998–2006	Howth	
D-530	Marguerite Joan Harris	2006–2011	Relief fleet	
TFR-02	Marguerite Joan Harris	2011–2013	Flood Rescue	
FR-06	Marguerite Joan Harris	2013–2020	Flood Rescue	
D-531	Walter Grove	1998–2008	Horton and Port Eynon	
D-531	Walter Grove	2008	Relief fleet	
FR-09	Walter Grove	2008–2019	Flood Rescue	
D-532	Kingsand	1998–2008	Moelfre	
D-532	Kingsand	2008–2009	Relief fleet	
D-532	Kingsand	2009–2010	Dún Laoghaire	
BB-532	Kingsand	2010–2016	Boarding boat (Torbay)	
D-533	Peter Cornish	1998–2008	Selsey	
FR-03	Peter Cornish	2008–2015	Flood Rescue	
D-534	Severn Rescuer	1998–2008	Penarth	
FR-02	Severn Rescuer	2008–2020	Flood Rescue	
D-535	The Cromer Smuggler	1998–2008	Tynemouth	
D-535	The Cromer Smuggler	2008–2009	Relief fleet	
D-535	The Cromer Smuggler	2009	Aberystwyth	
D-535	The Cromer Smuggler	2009–2013	Training fleet	
D-536	Margaret II	1998–2008	Aberdeen	
D-536	Margaret II	2008–2010	Relief fleet	
BB-536	Margaret II	2010–2015	Boarding boat (Castletownbere)	
D-537	Faith	1998–2008	Weston-super-Mare	
D-537	Faith	2008–2009	Relief fleet	
D-537	Faith	2009–2010	Training fleet	
D-538	Tom Broom	1998–2008	Stranraer	
D-538	Tom Broom	2008–2009	Relief fleet	
D-538	Tom Broom	2009–2010	Skegness	
D-539	Hartlepool Dynamo	1998–2008	Broughty Ferry	
FR-07	Hartlepool Dynamo	2008–2020	Flood Rescue	
D-540	Cecile Rampton II	1998–2008	Hastings	
D-540	Cecile Rampton II	2008–2009	Relief fleet	
D-540	Cecile Rampton II	2009–2010	Training fleet	
D-541	Brian and Margaret Wiggins	1999–2009	Withernsea	
FR-17	Brian and Margaret Wiggins	2009–2019	Flood Rescue	
BB-541	Brian and Margaret Wiggins	2019–	Boarding boat	
D-542	AB-One	1999–2008	Craster	
D-542	AB-One	2008–2011	Relief fleet	
D-543	Saint David Dewi Sant	1998–2008	St Davids	
D-543	Saint David Dewi Sant	2008–2009	Relief fleet	
FR-12	Saint David Dewi Sant	2009–2020	Flood Rescue	
D-544	The Hastings	1999–2009	Dunbar	
FR-18	The Hastings	2009–2014	Flood Rescue	
BB-544	The Hastings	2015–	Boarding boat (Tynemouth)	
D-545	Tigger Too	1999–2008	Margate	
D-545	Tigger Too	2008–2010	Relief fleet	
D-545P	Tigger Too	2010–2020	Publicity	
D-546	Spirit of the PCS RE II	1999–2009	Port Isaac	
D-546	Spirit of the PCS RE II	2009–2013	Training fleet	
BB-546	Spirit of the PCS RE II	2013–2022	Boarding boat (Appledore)	
D-547	Society of Societies	1999–2009	Cardigan	
D-547	Society of Societies	2009–2011	Relief fleet	
BB-547	Society of Societies	2011–2018	Boarding boat (Alderney)	
D-548	Star of the Sea	1999–2009	Courtown	
D-548	Star of the Sea	2009–2010	Relief fleet	
D-549	George and Christine	1999–2009	Minehead	
D-550	Gwenllian The Rotary Club of Port Talbot	1999–2009	Port Talbot	
D-550	Gwenllian The Rotary Club of Port Talbot	2009–2010	Relief fleet	
D-550P	Gwenllian The Rotary Club of Port Talbot	2010–2020	Publicity	
D-551	Spirit of Alderney	1999–2009	Alderney	
D-551	Spirit of Alderney	2009–2011	Training fleet	
D-552	Global Marine	1999–2000	Marazion	
D-552	Global Marine	2000–2003	Relief fleet	
D-552	Global Marine	2003–2004	Anstruther	
D-552	Global Marine	2004–2005	Relief fleet	
D-552	Global Marine	2005–2006	Burnham-on-Sea	
D-552	Global Marine	2006–2007	Relief fleet	
D-552	Global Marine	2007–2017	Training fleet	
D-552P	Global Marine	2017	Publicity	
D-553	David Whitehead	2001–2009	Kippford	
D-553	David Whitehead	2009–2010	Relief fleet	
BB-553	David Whitehead	2010–2021	Boarding boat (Barra Island)	
D-554	Heyland II	2000–2009	Portsmouth	
D-554	Heyland II	2009–2011	Training fleet	
D-555	Deborah Brown	2000–2009	Ilfracombe	
D-555	Deborah Brown	2009–2013	Relief fleet	
BB-555	Deborah Brown	2013–	Boarding boat (Tobermory)	
D-556	Saddleworth	2000–2009	Fleetwood	
D-556	Saddleworth	2009–2010	Relief fleet	
BB-556	Saddleworth	2010–2018	Boarding boat	
D-557	Lord Feoffees III	2000–2009	Bridlington	
D-557	Lord Feoffees III	2009–2011	Training fleet	
D-558	William and Rose Nall	2000–2010	Blackpool	
BB-558	William and Rose Nall	2010–2016	Boarding boat (Eastbourne)	
D-559	Seahorse II	2000–2009	Clacton-on-Sea	
D-560	John Wesley Hillard II	2001–2009	Scarborough	
D-560	John Wesley Hillard II	2009–2010	Relief fleet	
D-561	Cursitor Street	2001–2009	Fenit	
D-561	Cursitor Street	2009–2015	Relief fleet	
FR-06	Cursitor Street	2015–????	Flood Rescue	
D-562	Georgina Stanley Taylor	2001–2009	Tenby	
D-562	Georgina Stanley Taylor	2009–2015	Relief fleet	
D-563	Rotary District 1120	2001–2008	Filey	
D-563	Rotary District 1120	2008–2011	Training fleet	
D-564	Peter Bond	2001–2009	Morecambe	
D-564	Peter Bond	2009–2010	Workington	
D-564	Peter Bond	2010–2011	Training fleet	
BB-564	Peter Bond	2011–	Boarding boat	
D-565	Tony Heard	2001–2009	Dún Laoghaire	
D-565	Tony Heard	2009–2015	Relief fleet	
D-566	Norah Cadman	2001–2010	Blackpool	
BB-566	Norah Cadman	2010–2018	Boarding boat (Fishguard)	
D-567	Spirit of Tamworth	2001–2010	Barrow	Sold to Duddon Inshore Rescue
D-567	Unnamed	2011–2016	Duddon Inshore Rescue	Sold to Duddon Inshore Rescue
D-568	Seahorse III	2001–2010	Cromer	
D-568	Seahorse III	2010–2012	Relief fleet	
BB-568	Seahorse III	2012–2014	Boarding boat (Alderney)	
D-569	Rosemary Palmer	2001–2010	Amble	
D-570	Joan and Ted Wiseman 50	2001–2002	Eastbourne	
D-570	Roger B. Harbour	2002–2003	Relief fleet	
D-570	Roger B. Harbour	2003–2004	North Berwick	
D-570	Roger B. Harbour	2004–2006	Ballyglass	
D-570	Roger B. Harbour	2006–2007	Relief fleet	
D-570	Roger B. Harbour	2007	Weston-super-Mare	
D-570	Roger B. Harbour	2008–2010	Filey	
D-570	Roger B. Harbour	2010–2011	Relief fleet	
D-570P	Roger B. Harbour	2011–2015	Publicity	
BB-570	Roger B. Harbour	2015–2021	Boarding boat	
D-571	Three Brothers	2001–2010	Campbeltown	
D-571	Three Brothers	2010–2011	Relief fleet	
BB-571	Three Brothers	2011–2019	Boarding boat (Portree)	
D-572	Ken and Mary	2002–2010	Portrush	
D-573	Leicester Fox II	2002–2008	Skegness	
D-573	Leicester Fox II	2008–2009	Relief fleet	
D-573	Leicester Fox II	2009–2011	Training fleet	
D-574	Regina Mary	2002–2010	Looe	
D-574	Regina Mary	2010–2011	Relief fleet	
D-574P	Regina Mary	2011–2015	Publicity	
BB-574	Regina Mary	2015–	Boarding boat	
D-575	Hounslow	2002–2010	Port St Mary	
BB-575	Hounslow	2010–2018	Boarding boat (Porthdinllaen)	
D-576	Spirit of the Thames	2002–2010	Teddington	Last EA16 lifeboat
D-576	Spirit of the Thames	2010–2016	Relief fleet	Last EA16 lifeboat
D-576P	Spirit of the Thames	2016–2017	Publicity	Last EA16 lifeboat
FR-04	Spirit of the Thames	2017–2020	Flood Rescue	Last EA16 lifeboat
