= Horton and Port Eynon Lifeboat Station =

RNLI lifeboat station in the City and County of Swansea, Wales

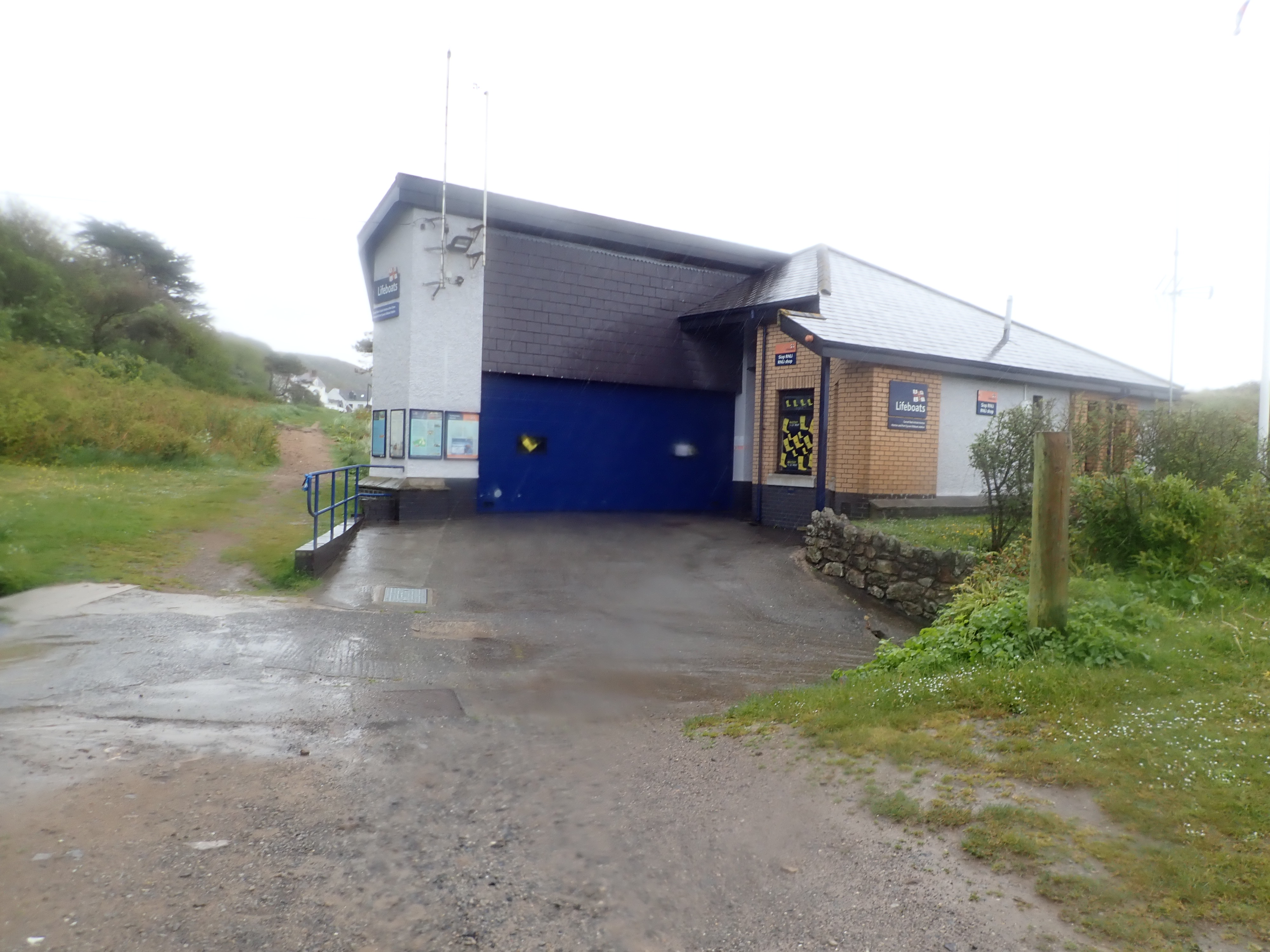
- Horton and Port Eynon Lifeboat Station

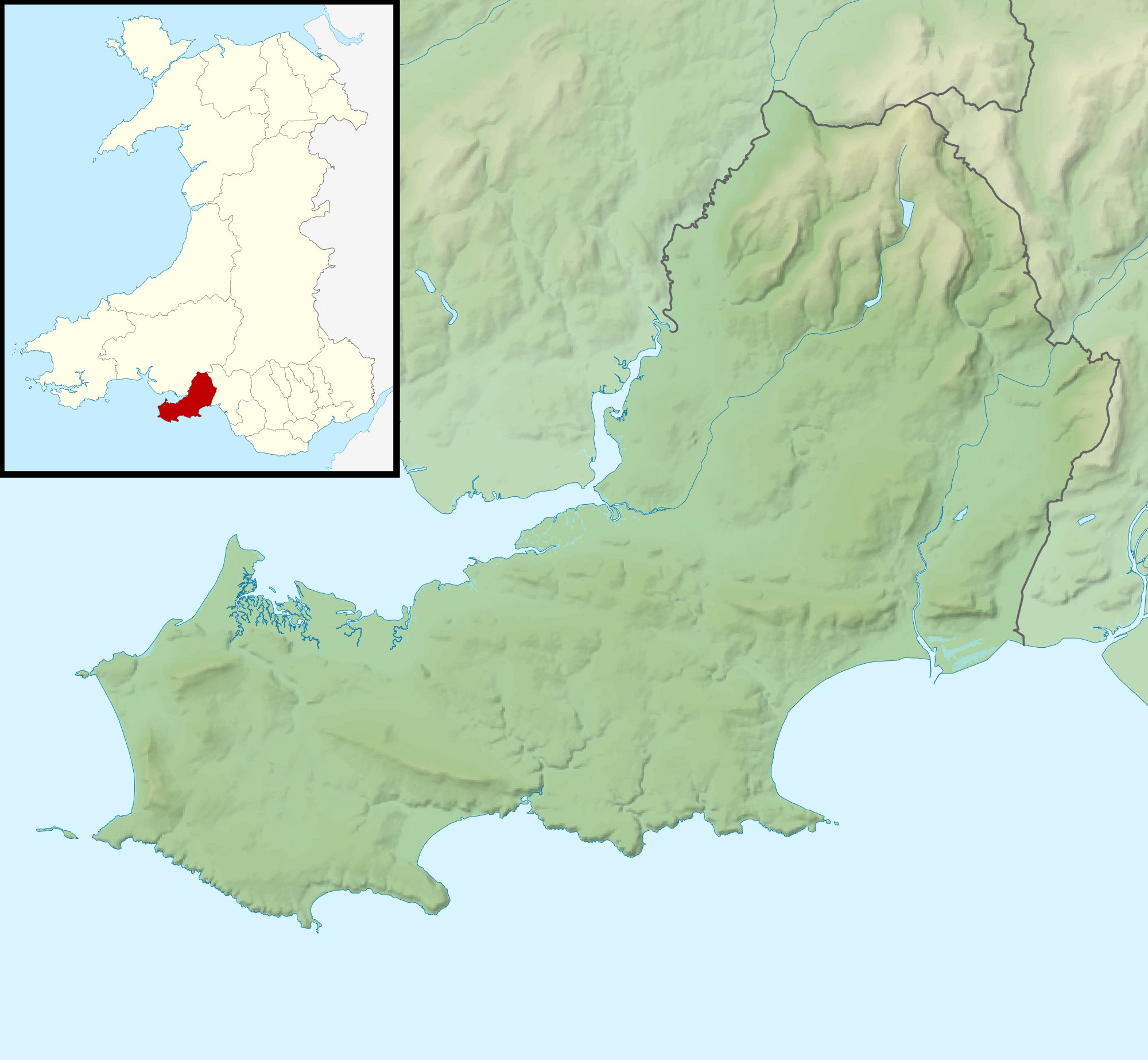
- Location within Swansea
- Former names: Port Eynon Lifeboat Station

General information
- Type: RNLI Lifeboat Station
- Location: Horton, Swansea, Wales, SA3 1LB, UK
- Coordinates: 51°32′53.9″N 4°12′03.9″W
- Opened: 1884–1919; ILB 1968–present
- Owner: Royal National Lifeboat Institution

Website
- Horton and Port Eynon RNLI Lifeboat Station

Horton and Port Eynon Lifeboat Station is located at Horton Beach, just off Underhill Lane in the village of Horton, on the south coast of the Gower Peninsula in Wales, approximately 14 miles (23 km) west of Swansea.

Port Eynon Lifeboat Station was established at Port Eynon in 1884 by the Royal National Lifeboat Institution (RNLI), but closed in 1919. Horton and Port Eynon Lifeboat Station, an Inshore lifeboat station, was established by the RNLI in 1968.

The station currently operates Barbara Jane (D-824), a D-class (IB1) Inshore lifeboat, on station since 2018.

== History ==
On 27 January 1883, the steamship Agnes Jack ran aground at Port Eynon Point. Villagers were helpless to do anything but watch on, as eighteen men were drowned.

On 7 February 1883, the schooner Surprise was wrecked just north of Port Eynon Point, with the loss of all seven hands.

As a result of these tragedies, the RNLI decided a lifeboat should be stationed further west than The Mumbles Lifeboat Station. A 34-foot self-righting 'Pulling and Sailing' (P&S) lifeboat, one with sails and (10) oars, along with equipment and a transporting carriage, was dispatched to Port Eynon, where a new boathouse had been constructed, at a cost of £400.

The costs of the lifeboat had been met from the bequest of £1000 from the late Miss Maria Jones, of Waterloo, Liverpool. At a ceremony on 10 May 1884, the lifeboat was named A Daughter's Offering (ON 55) at the donor's request, and then launched on demonstration to the assembled crowd.

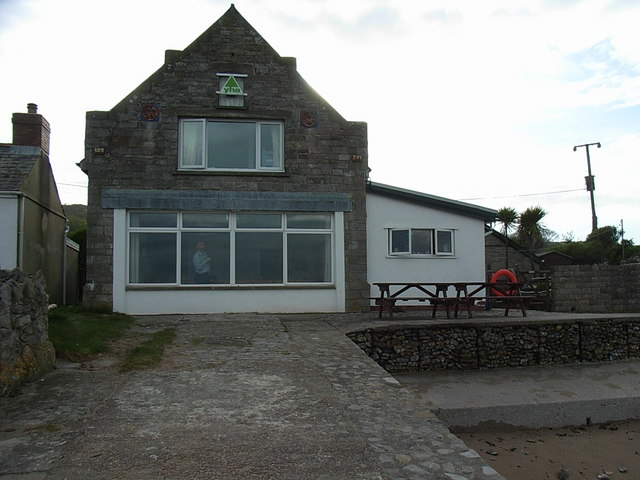
1884 Port Eynon Lifeboat House

The boathouse was constructed at the west end of Port Eynon Bay. This building is now used as a Youth Hostel by the Youth Hostel Association (YHA).

At 19:00 on 13 January 1888, the Port Eynon lifeboat was launched to the aid of the steamship Milan of Kingston-upon-Hull, on passage to Bristol from Alexandria, when she was driven ashore at Overton Cliffs. 11 crew were rescued by the lifeboat, with the remaining crew rescued by rocket apparatus.

A Daughter's Offering was replaced after 22 years of service. In that time, she saved 39 lives. A new 35-foot lifeboat was placed on station in 1906. The cost of the new boat was defrayed from the bequest of Col. John A. Hay of Cheltenham. In accordance with his wishes, the boat was named Janet (ON 559), at a ceremony on 23 August 1906.

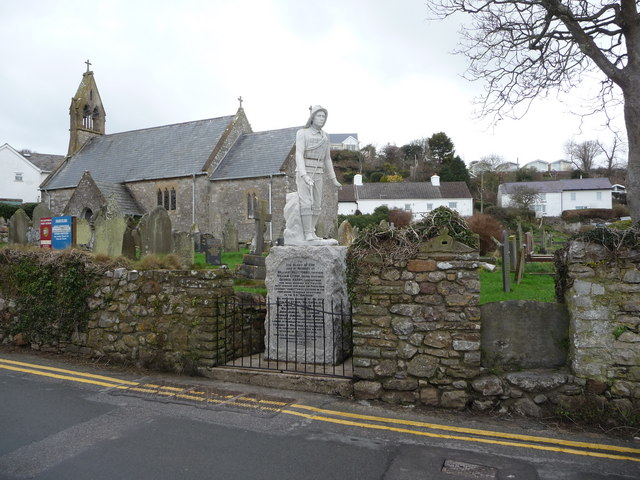
Port Eynon Lifeboat Memorial

Tragedy struck on 1 January 1916. Janet responded to a distress signal from the S.S. Dunvegan, and while making her way to the vessel, the lifeboat was capsized by a large wave. Although the lifeboat automatically righted itself, one crew member could not make it back onboard and drowned. Janet was then capsized again, and another two crew members were lost overboard and could not be found. The lifeboat had lost all of its oars at this point, and the remaining 10 men could do nothing but drift towards Mumbles, finally landing ashore some 30 hours after setting out.

- See Lifeboat Disasters

The Janet lifeboat was withdrawn, and the station closed temporarily in 1916. The lifeboat had served for 10 years, saving a total of 15 lives. However, the boat would never return, and Port Eynon Lifeboat Station closed permanently in 1919. The Janet would later serve at Stornoway. A sculpture commemorating the lost crew of the Janet can be found in the churchyard of Port Eynon Church, and there is also a plaque inside the church.

== Inshore lifeboat station ==
In 1964, in response to an increasing amount of water-based leisure activity, the RNLI placed 25 small fast Inshore lifeboats around the country. These were easily launched with just a few people, ideal to respond quickly to local emergencies.

More stations were opened, and in 1968, a D-class (EA16) lifeboat (D-165) was allocated to the new Horton and Port Eynon Lifeboat Station, based close to the beach in Horton.

On 2 July 1973, D-class Helm John Grove took the boat close inshore, through broken water and past jagged rocks, to rescue three of four people, initially stranded on Worms Head (Penrhyn-gwyr), who then decided to try and swim against the flood tide to shore. The fourth person was rescued by rocket line. He was awarded the RNLI Bronze Medal.

A new boathouse to accommodate both the lifeboat and the tractor was completed in March 1992. It also included a crewroom with galley, a souvenir outlet, toilet, fuel store and a look-out tower.

== Station honours ==
The following are awards made at Horton & Port Eynon:

- RNLI Bronze Medal
  John Walter Grove – 1973
- 'The Thanks of the Institution Inscribed on Vellum'
  Charles Gwilyn Twitchett – 1973
  Andrew John McNulty – 1973
  John Walter Grove – 1974
- 'A Framed Letter of Thanks signed by the Chairman of the Institution'
  Lawrence Grove – 1999
- Member, Order of the British Empire (MBE)
  Lawrence James Grove – 2001QBH
  Steven William Davies – 2015NYH

== Roll of honour ==
In memory of those lost whilst serving Horton and Port Eynon lifeboat:

Lost when the lifeboat Janet (ON 559) capsized on service to the steamship Dunvegan, 1 January 1916.

- William Gibbs, Coxswain (66)
  William Eynon, Second Coxswain (46)
  George Harry (46)

== Horton and Port Eynon lifeboats ==
=== Pulling and Sailing (P&S) lifeboats ===
ON (Note: ON is the RNLI's Official Number of the boat.)	Name	Built	On station	Class	Comments
55	A Daughter's Offering	1883	1884–1906	34-foot Self-Righting (P&S)	(Note: 34 ft 0 in (10.36 m) x 8 ft 0 in (2.44 m) (10-oared) self-righting (P&S) lifeboat, legacy of Miss Maria Jones of Liverpool, built by Forrestt of Limehouse, London, costing £298.); Broken up in 1906
559	Janet	1906	1906–1916	35-foot Self-Righting (P&S)	(Note: 35 ft 0 in (10.67 m) x 8 ft 6 in (2.59 m) (10-oared) self-righting (P&S) lifeboat, legacy of Col. J. A. Hay of Cheltenham, built by Thames Ironworks of Blackwall, London, costing £810.); Capsized on service, 1 January 1916. Transferred to the relief fleet, later at Stornoway.

Station closed in 1916.

=== Inshore lifeboats ===
==== d class ====
Op. No. (Note: Op. No. is the RNLI's Operational Number of the boat carried on the hull.)	Name	On Station	Class	Comments
D-165	Unnamed	1968–1980	D-class (RFD PB16)	
D-275	Unnamed	1980–1988	D-class (RFD PB16)	
D-380	Unnamed	1988–1997	D-class (EA16)	
D-448	Sea Ranger	1997–1998	D-class (EA16)	
D-531	Walter Grove	1998–2008	D-class (EA16)	
D-688	Albert Wordley	2008–2018	D-class (IB1)	
D-824	Barbara Jane	2018–	D-class (IB1)	

== See also ==
- List of RNLI stations
- List of former RNLI stations
- Royal National Lifeboat Institution lifeboats
