= Ballycotton Lifeboat Station =

RNLI Lifeboat station in County Cork, Ireland

- Flag of the RNLI

- Ballycotton lifeboat and station

- Location within Ireland

General information
- Type: Lifeboat station
- Location: The Pier, Ballycotton, County Cork, Ireland
- Coordinates: 51.827028°N 8.001667°W
- Opened: First station 1858; Current building 2002
- Cost: £352,561
- Owner: Royal National Lifeboat Institution

Website
- Ballycotton RNLI Lifeboat Station

Ballycotton Lifeboat Station can be found on The Pier, at the head of the harbour in Ballycotton, a fishing village approximately 40 kilometres (25 mi) east of Cork, sitting on a headland overlooking Ballycotton Bay in County Cork, on the south coast of Ireland.

A lifeboat station was established at Ballycotton by the Royal National Lifeboat Institution (RNLI) in 1858. Their most notable rescue was the crew of the Daunt Rock lightship in 1936, which kept the lifeboat at sea for the best part of three days.

The station currently operates a Trent-class All-weather lifeboat, 14-25 Austin Lidbury (ON 1233), on station since 1998. The boat is scheduled for replacement in 2026.

== History ==
The Royal National Institution for the Preservation of Life from Shipwreck (RNIPLS) was established in 1824. By 1854, the year the RNIPLS became the RNLI, there were only four lifeboats on the whole coast of Ireland, although a number of medals and monetary rewards had been awarded to people who had saved life from shipwrecks. For rescues in Ballycotton Bay, local man Dennis Cronen received a silver medal, for saving one person from the Brittania on 21 December 1825, while coastguards Lieutenant Samuel Lloyd and John Hennessy respectively received a gold medal and a silver medal, for the rescue of 10 people from the Spanish ship Capricho on 25 January 1829.

When the barque Choice of North Shields was driven ashore in a snowstorm on 16 February 1855, a local ship's pilot tried to muster a boat and crew to rescue the people from the ship, but by the time they were ready, the tide had gone out and the ship's crew were able to walk ashore.

At a meeting of the RNLI committee of management, on 1 January 1857, a sum of £4 was rewarded to four men, who had rescued the crew of six from the schooner Ellen, of Cardigan, which had wrecked in Ballycotton Bay. It was decided to place a lifeboat at Ballycotton at the earliest opportunity.

A 28-foot-long (8.5 m) Peake-class self-righting 'Pulling and Sailing' (P&S) lifeboat, one with sails and six oars, was ordered from Forrestt of Limehouse, London, at a cost of £131. The boat and its carriage were transported from London to Cork free of charge by the Cork Steam-ship Company, and then to Ballycotton, where a boathouse was constructed, costing £83.

The first lifeboat ultimately proved to be too small, with insufficient room for the lifeboat crew, and a rescued crew. In 1866, the boat was replaced, with a larger 32-foot-long (9.8 m) lifeboat, St Clair. The boat, rowing 10 oars instead of the previous six, cost £252, and required modification to the boathouse. The new and old lifeboats and carriages were conveyed free of charge between London and Cork by the Cork Steamship Company.

A new boathouse with slipway costing £245, was constructed at the head of the harbour in 1873, offset by the sale of the old boathouse £63.

St Clair was replaced after 14 years. A new 34 ft (10 m) lifeboat was funded by Miss Ada Goldsmith Tulloh of West Malvern, who established a lifeboat fund in order to pay tribute to her famous ancestor. "I confidently put forth this appeal, not only in virtue of the Life-boat's noble mission and memorable services, but feeling sure that all who have read with pleasure ' The Vicar of Wakefield,' 'The Traveller,' and 'The Deserted Village,' will not fail in helping me to further this good work". At a ceremony held on Thursday 29 July 1880, the lifeboat, which cost £329, was named Oliver Goldsmith, after the Anglo-Irish poet, novelist and playwright.

Oliver Goldsmith was launched just five times, but saved 21 lives in 11 years on service, including the six crew of the fishing yawl Daring, which got in to trouble when a sudden gale blew up on 17 October 1884. She was replaced in 1890 with a larger 37 ft (11 m) lifeboat, T. P. Hearne (ON 295). Modifications were once again required to the boathouse and slipway, at a cost of £209.

== 1930 onwards ==
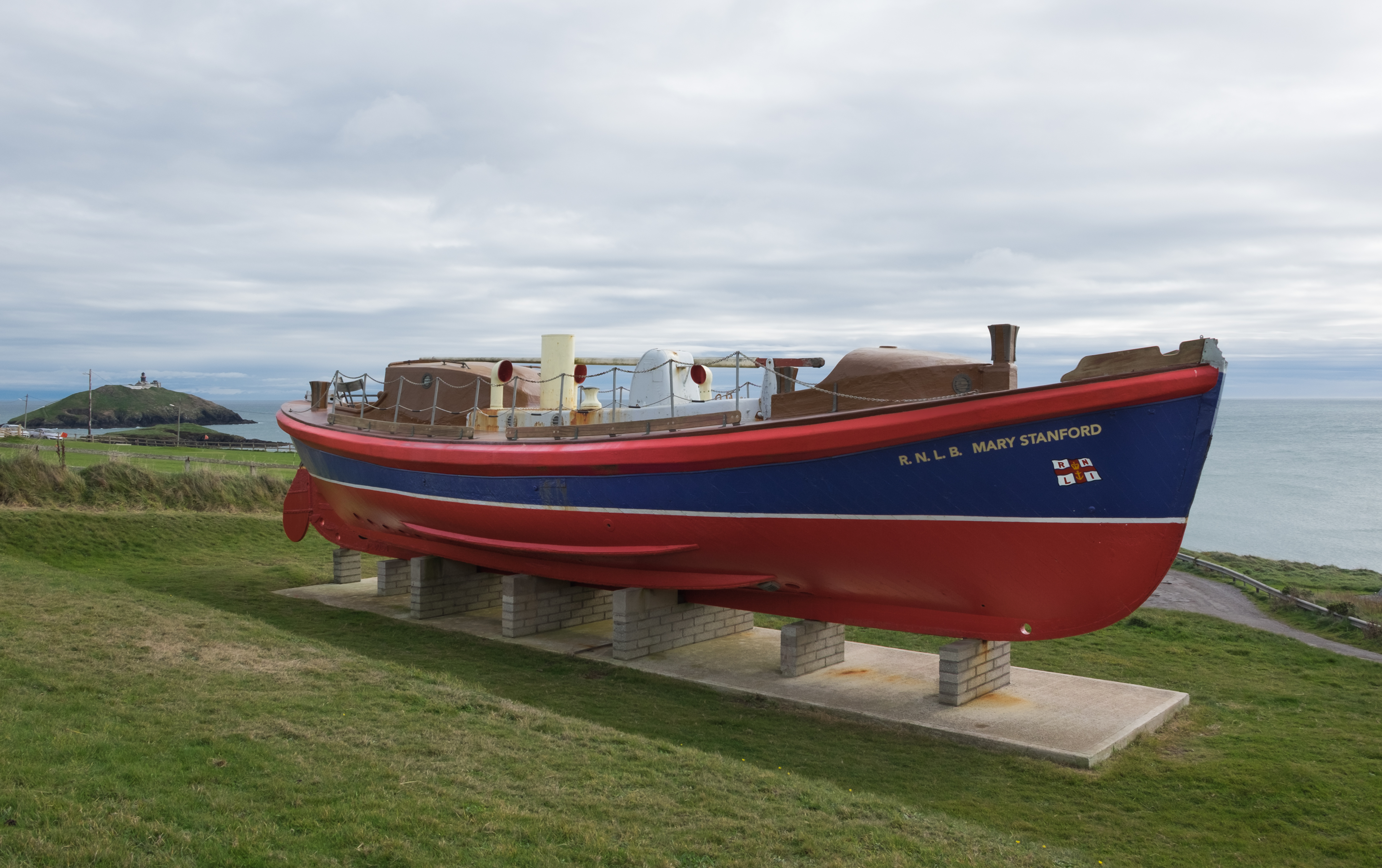
RNLB Mary Stanford (ON 733), now on display at Ballycotton

Ballycotton would receive their first motor-powered lifeboat on 4 September 1930, a 51-foot Barnett-class, with twin 60-hp Weyburn CE6 petrol engines, delivering a top speed of 9 knots (17 km/h; 10 mph). The boat had a range of 60 miles at full speed, and could carry 100 people in rough weather. The lifeboat was the third lifeboat funded from the legacy of Mr J. F. Stanford of Regent's Park, and the third to carry the name Mary Stanford.

When the Mary Stanford was presented to the lifeboat station in 1931, it was noted that the village had a population of only 464 people, yet 60 were regular subscribers to the RNLI, and their fundraising the previous year had amounted to almost 6 shillings per resident, equivalent to £18 in 2025. Every member of the lifeboat crew was from either the Sliney or Walsh families.

During her 29 years on service at Ballycotton, Mary Stamford (ON 733) was launched 83 times, saving 101 lives, including the eight crew of the Daunt Rock Lightship Comet (see below). The lifeboat is preserved on display on the headland at Ballycotton.

In 1973, the Ballycotton lifeboat Ethel Mary (ON 949) was sent away for refurbishment, replaced temporarily by the relief lifeboat John Gellatly Hyndman (ON 923). During her time at Ballycotton, the relief lifeboat was called eleven times.

The Trent-class All-weather lifeboat Austin Lidbury (ON 1233) was placed on service on 5 March 1998. The new lifeboat, costing £1,200,000, was primarily funded by the legacy of Miss Mary Lidbury, and employed twin 808-hp MAN D2860 diesel engines, delivering a top speed of 25 knots (46 km/h; 29 mph).

A new boathouse providing up to date crew facilities was constructed in 2002, completed in December, at a cost of £352,561. The boathouse was finished in a yellow colour wash, to match surrounding buildings.

== Daunt Rock lightship wreck ==
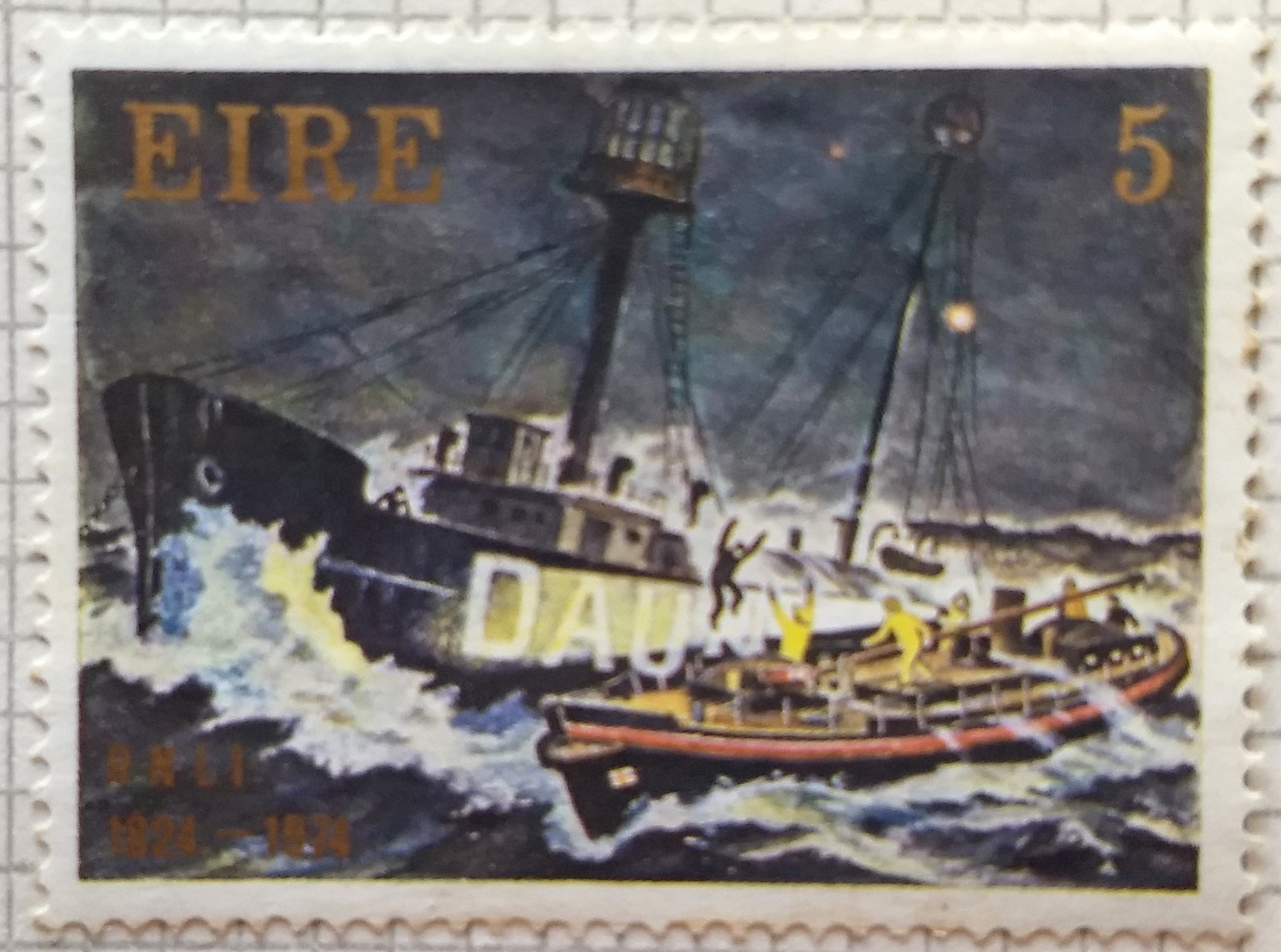
Postage stamp commemorating the Daunt Rock rescue

Hurricane-force winds were blowing on 10 February 1936, with such force that sea spray was being blown over the top of the 196 feet (60 m) tall lighthouse. The lifeboat crew made their way to the lifeboat station without being summoned, expecting that some ship or other would require their help. When the time came it was Comet, the Daunt Rock lightship, that needed aid. The storm had proved too much for its anchors, and it was being blown towards the shore.

Visibility was less than 50 yd (46 m) at times and, after two hours searching in vain, the lifeboat Mary Stanford put into Queenstown harbour, to see if there was any news of where the lightship had drifted to. The coastguard directed them to a new area and they found lightship, which had managed to get an anchor down. The crew were reluctant to abandon their ship as it would be a navigation hazard if left where it was, so the lifeboat stood by, ready to provide whatever assistance they could. A British warship, HMS Tenedos, was also in attendance, and both vessels tried to tow the lightship back to its correct position, with no success.

The warship stayed with the lightship for the night, while the lifeboat returned to Queenstown to refuel and give the crew some rest. They returned to the scene the following morning and spent the day warning other ships that the lightship was out of position. After a lightship support vessel arrived to assist, the lifeboat returned to Queenstown again to refuel, although this took longer than expected, as the petrol was not immediately available. On their return, the lightship had drifted to a more dangerous position, requiring the rescue of the eight crew; a difficult task given the small space now between it and the rocks. It took five attempts to save all the crew; during one attempt the two vessels collided, damaging the lifeboat. When the lifeboat returned home, the crew had been on call for 76 hours, it was 63 hours since they launched, and had been at sea for 49 hours, many of those without any food.

The RNLI Gold Medal was awarded to coxswain Patrick Sliney, with silver medals to John Walsh (Second Coxswain) and Thomas Sliney (Motor Mechanic), and bronze medals to the other crew members: John Sliney, William Sliney, Michael Walsh and Thomas Walsh. Patrick Sliney told the story in a radio broadcast on 13 March, and again on a local radio programme, whilst the crew were in London to collect their medals on 6 May.

== Other service awards ==
Nine people were saved from the steamship Tadorna, in trouble in a storm on 15 November 1911. Coxswain Richard Harding was awarded the RNLI Silver Medal for leading the rescue. 12 other people were rescued by rocket apparatus from the shore.

There were two medal services during World War II. On 30 January 1941. eight people were rescued from the SS Primrose, which was sinking about 17 nmi (31 km) from Ballycotton. Patrick Sliney was awarded the RNLI Bronze Medal for making the rescue, despite thick fog and enemy mines in Ballycotton Bay. On 23 December 1942 the lifeboat put out in a gale to save 35 people and the SS Irish Ash, a service that lasted 30 hours. Patrick Sliney received a silver medal, to go with his gold and bronze medals. William Sliney received his second bronze award, while Michael Lane and Thomas Sliney also received bronze medals.

The 1979 Fastnet Race was ripped apart, when a storm blew up on 13 August. 306 yachts were taking part, and 13 lifeboats from both England and Ireland, including Ballycotton, set out to help. All 13 lifeboat stations received a Special Certificate of Thanks.

Crew member and emergency mechanic Fergal Walsh earned the RNLI silver medal, for a service on 18 August 2001, not involving the lifeboat. With the assistance of Peter Cuthbert, he entered the sea with a buoy attached to a line, to save a young man swept into the sea by an unexpected wave. Despite getting injured, he managed to retrieve the man to the rocks, where all three were recovered by the Coastguard cliff rescue team.

== Station honours ==
The following awards have been made at Ballycotton:

- RNIPLS Gold Medal
  Lt. Samuel Lloyd, RN, Chief Officer, H.M. Coastguard, Ballycotton – 1829
- RNIPLS Silver Medal
  Dennis Cronen – 1826
  John Hennessy, Extra Man, H.M. Coastguard, Ballycotton – 1829
- RNLI Gold Medal
  Patrick Sliney, Coxswain – 1936
- RNLI Silver Medal
  Richard Harding, Coxswain – 1911
  John Lane Walsh, Second Coxswain – 1936
  Thomas Sliney, Motor Mechanic – 1936
  Patrick Sliney, Coxswain – 1943
  Fergal Walsh, crew member – 2002
- The Maud Smith Award 2001
  (for the bravest act of lifesaving during the year by a member of a lifeboat crew)
  Fergal Walsh, crew member – 2002
- The James Michael Bower Endowment Fund Award
  (awarded to those crew receiving Gold and Silver RNLI Medals)
  Fergal Walsh, crew member – 2002
- RNLI Bronze Medal
  Michael Coffey Walsh – 1936
  John Shea Sliney – 1936
  William Sliney – 1936
  Thomas Flavin Walsh – 1936
  Patrick Sliney, Coxswain – 1941
  Michael Lane Walsh, Second Coxswain – 1943
  Thomas Sliney, Motor Mechanic – 1943
  William Sliney, Assistant Motor Mechanic – 1943 (Second-Service clasp)
- Thanks of the Institution inscribed on Vellum
  Rev E. F. Duncan, Honorary Secretary – 1911
- A Framed Letter of Thanks signed by the Chairman of the Institution
  Peter Cuthbert – 2002
- A Special Framed Certificate (Fastnet Race)

The coxswain and crew – 1979

- Binoculars Glass
  Rev E. F. Duncan, Honorary Secretary – 1911
  P. Driscoll, committee member – 1911
  Mr Mahony, Honorary Secretary – 1936

== Roll of honour ==
In memory of those lost whilst serving at Ballycotton:

- Death attributed to him leaving his sickbed to supervise the launch of the lifeboat, 9 February 1911
  W. Harding, Coxswain

== Ballycotton lifeboats ==
=== Pulling and Sailing (P&S) lifeboats ===
On station	ON (Note: ON is the RNLI's Official Number of the boat.)	Name	Built	Class	Comments
1858–1866	Pre-319	Unnamed	1857	28-foot Peake self-righting (P&S)	(Note: 28 ft 0 in (8.53 m) x 6 ft 0 in (1.83 m) (6-oared) Peake-class self-righting (P&S) lifeboat, funded by the RNLI, built by Forrestt of Limehouse, London, costing £131.); Sold in 1866.
1866–1881	Pre-466	St Clair	1866	34-foot Prowse self-righting (P&S)	(Note: 32 ft 0 in (9.75 m) x 7 ft 6 in (2.29 m) (10-oared) Prowse-class self-righting (P&S) lifeboat, an anonymous gift, via Mrs St Clair of Lancashire, built by Woolfe of Shadwell, London, costing £252.); Broken up in 1880.
1880–1891	Pre-644	Oliver Goldsmith	1880	34-foot self-righting (P&S)	(Note: 34 ft 0 in (10.36 m) x 8 ft 0 in (2.44 m) (10-oared) self-righting (P&S) lifeboat, gift of the Oliver Goldsmith LB fund, via a relative of the poet, built by Woolfe of Shadwell, London, costing £329.); Sold in 1891. Renamed Boozer, last reported as a fishing boat at Ballycotton, 1930.
1891–1896	295	T. P. Hearne	1890	37-foot self-righting (P&S)	(Note: 37 ft 0 in (11.28 m) x 8 ft 0 in (2.44 m) (10/12-oared) self-righting (P&S) lifeboat, gift of Mr T. P. Hearne of London, built by Watkins of Blackwall, London, costing £545.); Transferred to Penarth.
1896–1930	387	T. P. Hearne	1896	37-foot self-righting (P&S)	(Note: 37 ft 0 in (11.28 m) x 9 ft 3 in (2.82 m) (12-oared) self-righting (P&S) lifeboat, gift of Mr T. P. Hearne of London, built by Forrestt of Limehouse, London, costing £455.); Sold in 1930. Renamed Heron, last reported as a yacht at Cork, 1960.

Pre ON numbers are unofficial numbers used by the Lifeboat Enthusiast Society to reference early lifeboats not included on the official RNLI list.

=== Motor lifeboats ===
On station	ON	Op.No. (Note: Op.No. is the RNLI's Operational Number of the boat carried on the hull.)	Name	Built	Class	Comments
1930–1959	733	–	Mary Stanford	1930	51-foot Barnett	It saw further use as a relief lifeboat until 1969. It is now on display back at Ballycotton.
1959–1985	949	–	Ethel Mary	1959	52-foot Barnett (Mk. II)	Withdrawn in 1988 and now used as a pleasure boat (reported to be at Coleraine in 2023).
1985–1998	1067	52-15	Hyman Winstone	1980	Arun	Previously at Holyhead and later at Larne, it was sold in 2003 for further service in Madeira.
1998–	1233	14-25	Austin Lidbury	1998	Trent	

More post-service details can be found on the respective lifeboat class pages.

== See also ==
- List of RNLI stations
- List of former RNLI stations
- Royal National Lifeboat Institution lifeboats
