= Ballyglass Lifeboat Station =

RNLI lifeboat station in County Mayo, Ireland

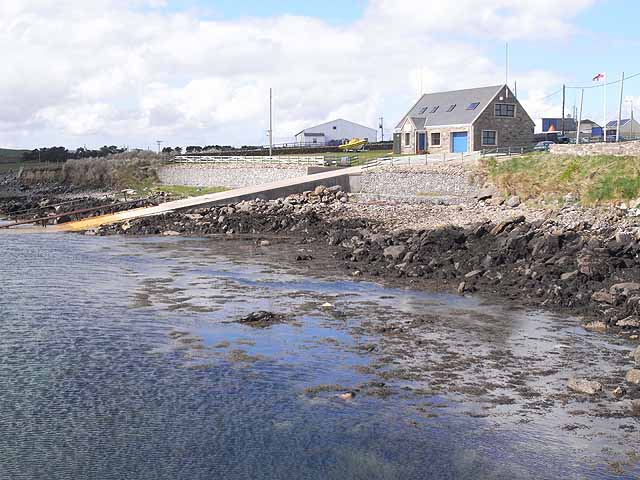
- Ballyglass ALB Station at Ballyglass Pier

- Location within Ireland

General information
- Type: RNLI Lifeboat Station
- Location: Ballyglass Pier, Broadhaven, County Mayo, Ireland
- Coordinates: 54°15′13.7″N 9°53′36.0″W
- Opened: October 1989
- Owner: Royal National Lifeboat Institution

Website
- Ballyglass RNLI Lifeboat Station

Ballyglass Lifeboat Station actually comprises two stations, both on the Mullet Peninsula in County Mayo, on the north west coast of Ireland.

Ballyglass lifeboat station was established in October 1989 by the Royal National Lifeboat Institution (RNLI).

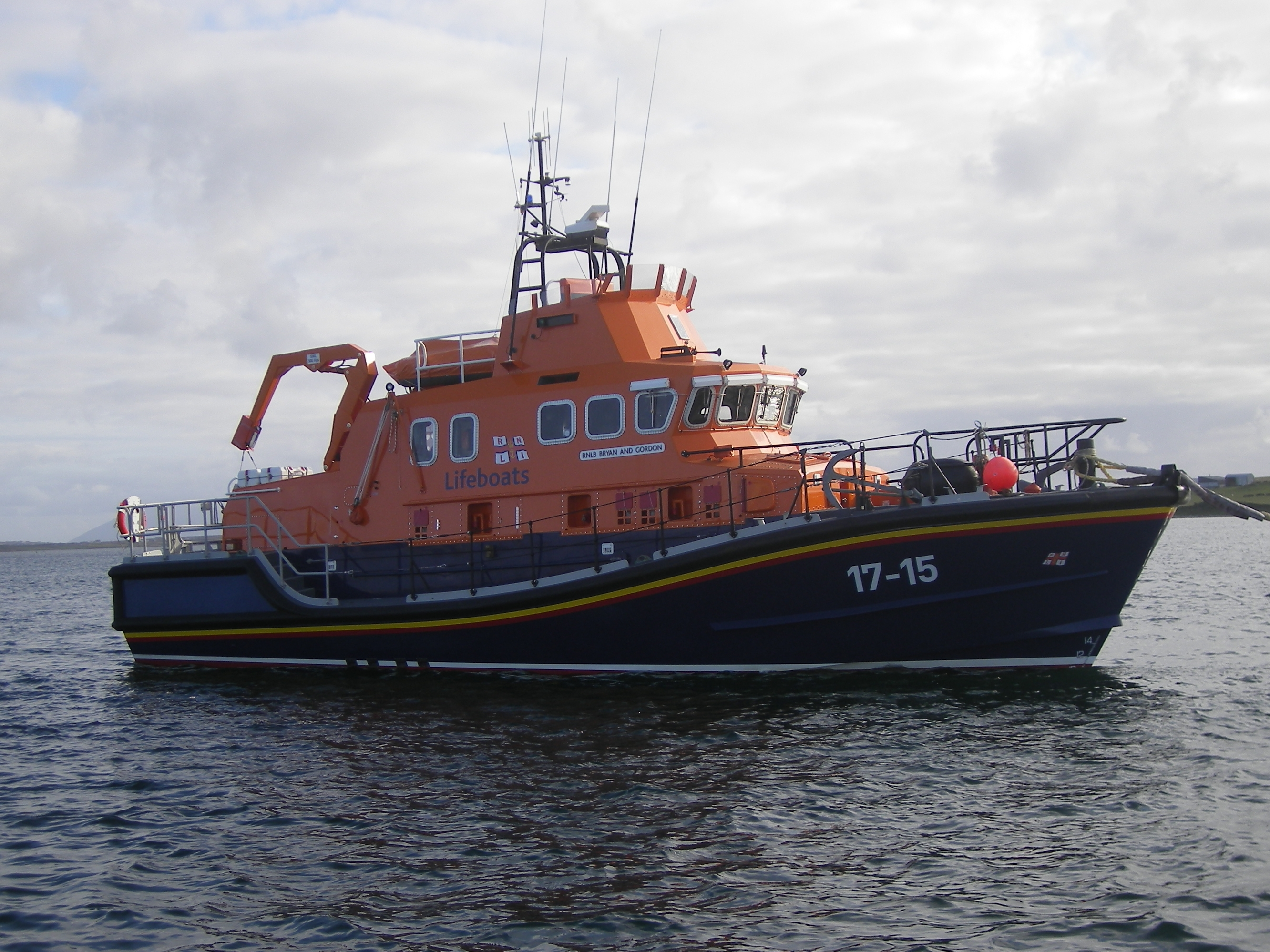
Ballyglass Severn-class lifeboat 17-15 Bryan and Gordon (ON 1235)

The station currently operates 17-15 Bryan and Gordon (ON 1235), a Severn-class All-weather lifeboat (ALB), on station since 1998, from Ballyglass Pier on Broadhaven Bay, and a D-class (IB1) Inshore lifeboat (ILB), Clann Lir (D-823), on station since 2018, from the station at Beach Road, Belmullet, strategically located to allow the boat to be launched from multiple sites.

== History ==
In 1988, the RNLI Committee of Management resolved to place an All-weather lifeboat at Ballyglass Pier, on Broadhaven Bay in County Mayo, for a 1-year evaluation period, with a view to establishing Ballyglass as a permanent lifeboat station. It would be the first new Offshore lifeboat station on the west coast of Ireland since 1927, and would close the gap between the lifeboats stations at Galway Bay and Arranmore.

60 volunteers came forward, 24 were shortlisted, and eight were selected for training at the RNLI Headquarters at Poole. The 13-year-old relief lifeboat 52-07 City of Bradford IV (ON 1052) was allocated to Ballyglass in June 1989, arriving on 26 August, and the lifeboat and station was officially operational on 17 October 1989.

Ballyglass would receive their permanent lifeboat in 1990, with the arrival of another Arun-class lifeboat. At a ceremony on 4 May 1991, President of Ireland Mary Robinson named the boat 52-45 Mabel Williams (ON 1159), with RNLI chairman Michael Vernon formally handing over the boat to the care of the Ballyglass lifeboat station.

A new boathouse and slipway were constructed in 1993 at a cost of £150,000. New crew facilities were provided, along with a workshop, souvenir shop, observation room, and a boathouse to house the boarding boat, the Arun-class lifeboat sitting on a mooring. The station building was formally opened on 28 May 1995.

Mabel Williams was withdrawn to the relief fleet on 14 August 1998, later to serve at Rosslare Harbour, and Ballyglass would receive one of the new 25-knot Severn-class All-weather lifeboats, which arrived on station on 14 August 1998. Funded primarily from a gift from Mr Bryan C. Griffiths, and Mr Gordon W. Griffiths, the boat was named 17-15 Bryan and Gordon (ON 1235).

On 14 May 2002, it was decided to place an additional Inshore lifeboat on the Mullet Peninsula. The D-class (EA16) Inshore lifeboat Lawnflite (D-492). arrived on 14 May. The Inshore boat was not placed at the station at Ballyglass Pier, but at a new station on the narrow isthmus to the Mullet Peninsula, at Belmullet. This allowed the boat to be launched to the north east, into Broadhaven Bay, or to the south west, into Blacksod Bay, both linked by Carter's Canal. A third option is to transport the boat approximately 5 kilometres (3.1 mi) due west, to launch directly into the Atlantic Ocean.

Ballyglass RNLI Inshore Lifeboat Station at Belmullet

A new Inshore lifeboat station building was constructed in 2007 at the end of Bridge Road, Belmullet, completed on 7 December, at a cost of £276,000.

For saving the life of a man aboard the yacht Rondo, in gale-force condition, on the night of 18/19 February 2005, Coxswain Patrick Walker received a "Framed Letter of Thanks signed by the Chairman of the Institution" in 2006.

The 2017 Annual Mint Coin Set, issued by the Central Bank of Ireland on behalf of the Department of Finance (Ireland), paid tribute to the vital work carried out by the Irish Coast Guard and Irish Lighthouses, but the launch was postponed, due to the loss of Rescue Helicopter 116. Following the tragedy, the Minister for Finance decided all proceeds were to be donated to the RNLI. Nearly 4,900 sets were sold, and a donation of €79,000 was made to the RNLI. A new D-class (IB1) lifeboat arrived on station at Ballyglass on 28 June 2018.

A competition was set at Belmullet National School to name the lifeboat, which was won by Sophie Reilly. At a ceremony on Saturday 13 October 2018, the boat was named Clann Lir (D-823). Clann Lir or The Children of Lir, is an Irish legend that tells the story of Lir and his four children.

== Bronze medal service ==
At 18:00 on the 25 October 1997, Ballyglass Lifeboat Mabel Williams (ON 1159) was tasked to an extraordinarily difficult rescue, a service which would take over 21 hours, and involve multiple agencies, but would cost the life of one rescuer.

A 16-foot currach boat with 4 aboard, had failed to return to Belderrig harbour. Local fishermen reported voices in a cave, west of Horse Island, 18 miles (29 km) from Ballyglass, On arrival on scene, the Severn-class launched the small daughter "Y boat", with John Gaughan and Cathal Reilly on board. After travelling 650 yards into the cave, they found the sea conditions inside the cave extremely rough, and it was impossible for them to be able to effect a rescue. Local divers Michael Heffernan and Joseph Barratt of the Grainne Uaile Sub-aqua club then volunteered to assist the lifeboat crew, and entered the cave in the Irish Marine Emergency Service (IMES) rescue boat. The divers were separated in the violent sea conditions, and when their line indicated a recall, only Barrett emerged.

At 00:30, the Garda Underwater Unit was called from Dublin, arriving at 04:00 by helicopter. Waiting until daybreak, two crew and three divers set off in the IMES RIB, at first beaten back, and then once in the cave, getting flung 300 feet to the back of cave in the violent conditions, their RIB ending upside-down on a ledge, with a wrecked engine, but otherwise intact, and with no injuries to the crew. There they discovered three members of the Murphy family on a ledge, but the owner of the boat, Will Ernst von Below, and diver Michael Heffernan, had not survived. At great personal risk, Garda Ciarán Doyle then swam 1,000 feet (300 m) out of the cave, where a tow was established, and the seven people were pulled to safety.

Ciarán Doyle was awarded the RNLI Bronze Medal. Three awards of the Walter Scott Medal for bravery were made by the Garda Síochána.

In 2024, two further members of the Garda rescue team in 1997, previously overlooked for their service, were each awarded the Scott Bronze Medal.

== Michael Heffernan Medal for Marine Gallantry ==
Following the tragedy in 1997, the Irish Department of Transport, Tourism and Sport inaugurated an award scheme for marine gallantry and meritorious service.

The Marine Gallantry Award is presented in the form of a medal, and was named "The Michael Heffernan Medal for Marine Gallantry". The medal is awarded in gold, silver or bronze. Michael Heffernan was posthumously awarded the first gold medal.

== Station honours ==
The following are awards made at Ballyglass:

- Michael Heffernan Medal for Marine Gallantry, (Awarded by the Irish Department of Transport, Tourism and Sport)'
  Michael Heffernan – 1998 (Gold) (Posthumous)
- Scott Gold Medal, awarded by the Garda Síochána
  Ciarán Doyle – 1998
- Scott Silver Medal, awarded by the Garda Síochána
  David M. Mulhall – 1998
  Seán O’Connell – 1998
- Scott Bronze Medal, awarded by the Garda Síochána
  Joseph Finnegan – 2024
  Kieran Flynn – 2024
- RNLI Bronze Medal
  Ciarán Doyle, Irish Garda (Underwater Unit) – 1998
- Irish National Maritime Bravery Award
  Joseph Barrett – 1998
  Seán McHale – 1998
  Martin Kavanagh – 1998
  Martin O'Donnell, fisherman – 1998
  Patrick O'Donnell, fisherman – 1998
- 'The Thanks of the Institution inscribed on Vellum'
  Joseph Barratt – 1998
  Michael Heffernan – 1998 (posthumous)
- 'A Framed Letter of Thanks signed by the Chairman of the Institution'
  John Gaughan, Assistant Mechanic – 1998
  Cathal Reilly, crew member – 1998
  Patrick Walker, Coxswain – 2006

== Ballyglass lifeboats ==
=== All-weather lifeboats ===
Ballyglass Pier 54°15′13.7″N 9°53′36.0″W

ON (Note: ON is the RNLI's Official Number of the boat.)	Op.No. (Note: Op.No. is the RNLI's Operational Number of the boat carried on the hull.)	Name	Built	On station	Class	Comments
1052	52-07	City of Bradford IV	1976	1989–1990	Arun	Previously at Humber and Thurso. Transferred to Tobermory
1159	52-45	Mabel Williams	1990	1990–1998	Arun	Transferred to the Relief fleet. Later at Rosslare Harbour.
1235	17-15	Bryan and Gordon	1998	1998–	Severn	

More post-service details can be found on the respective lifeboat class pages.

=== Inshore lifeboats ===
Belmullet 54°13′33.1″N 9°59′32.1″W

Op.No.	Name	On station	Class	Comments
D-492	Lawnflite	2002–2004	D-class (EA16)	
D-570	Roger B Harbour	2004–2006	D-class (EA16)	
D-507	Spirit of Bedworth and Nuneaton	2006–2008	D-class (EA16)	
D-687	The Western	2008–2018	D-class (IB1)	
D-823	Clann Lir	2018–	D-class (IB1)	

== See also ==
- List of RNLI stations
- List of former RNLI stations
- Royal National Lifeboat Institution lifeboats

== Sources ==
- Leonard, Richie; Denton, Tony (2026). Lifeboat Enthusiasts Handbook 2026. Lifeboats Enthusiasts' Society.
