= Flint Lifeboat Station =

RNLI lifeboat station in Flintshire, Wales

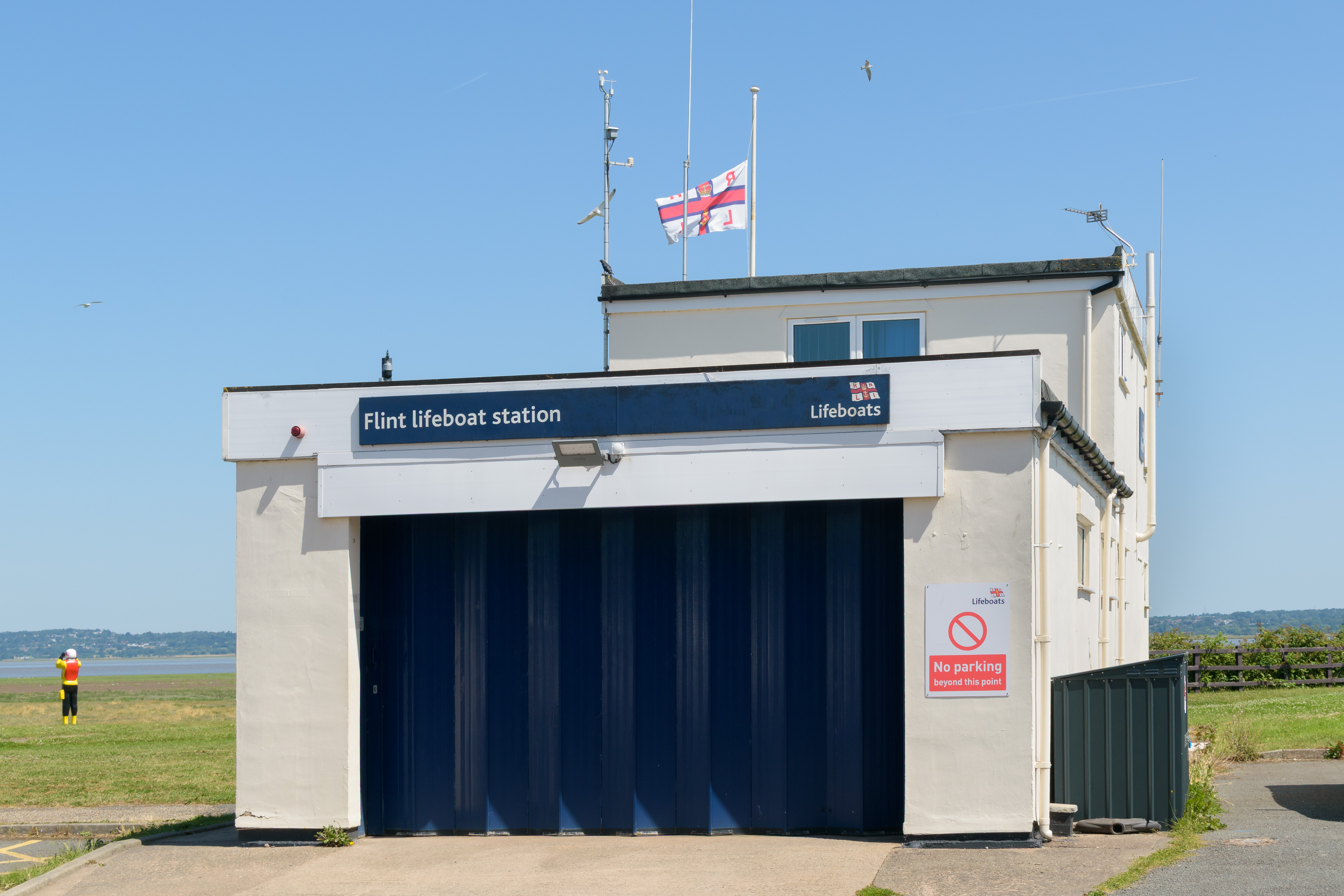
- Flint Lifeboat Station in 2025

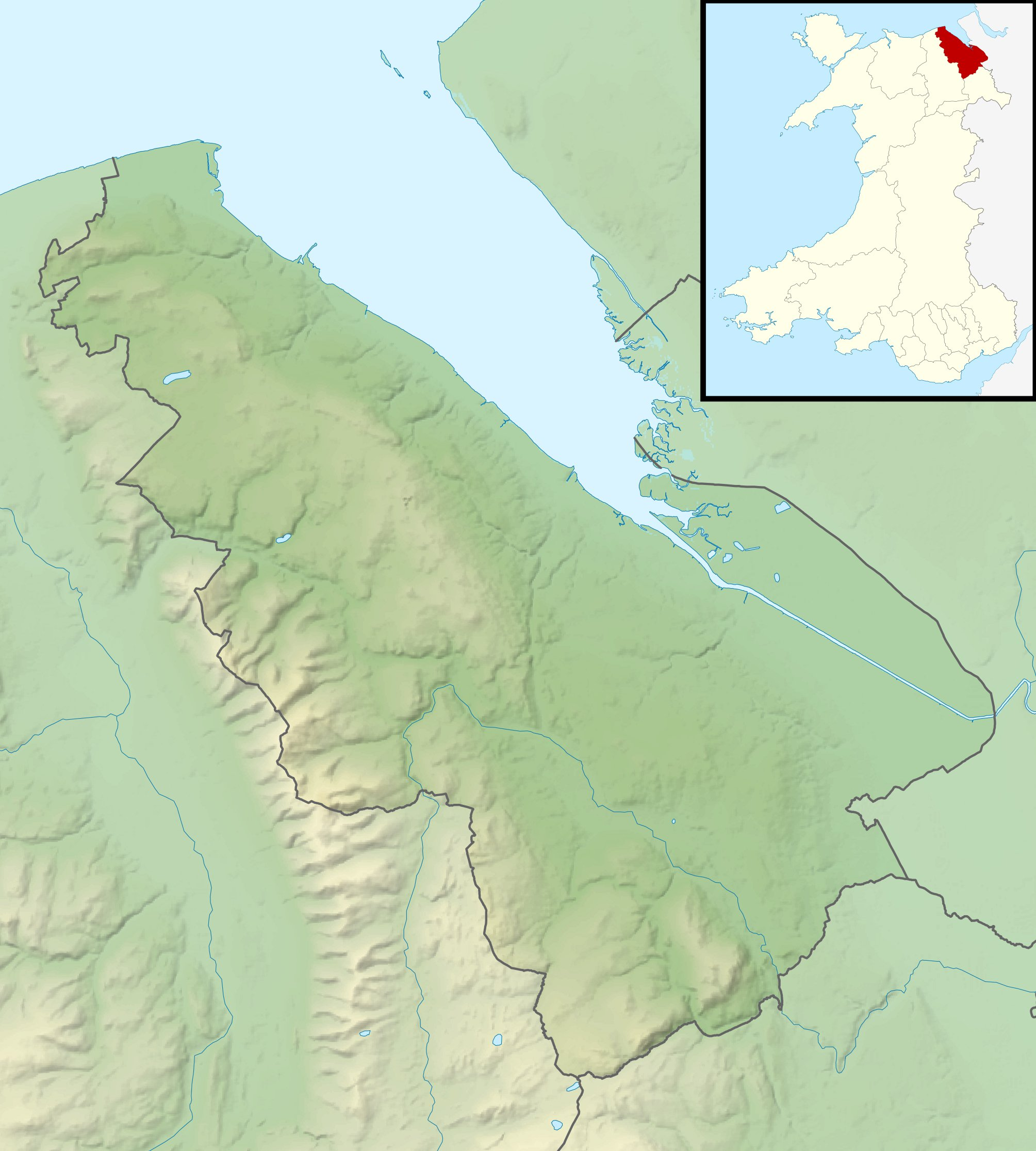
- Location within Flintshire

General information
- Type: RNLI Lifeboat Station
- Location: Castle Dyke Street, Flint, Flintshire, CH6 5PE, England
- Coordinates: 53°15′01.9″N 3°07′42.6″W
- Opened: May 1966
- Owner: Royal National Lifeboat Institution

Website
- Flint RNLI Lifeboat Station

Flint Lifeboat Station is located in the shadow of Flint Castle at the end of Castle Dyke Street, in Flint, a town situated on the south bank of the River Dee estuary, on the North Wales coast.

An Inshore lifeboat was first stationed in Flint by the Royal National Lifeboat Institution (RNLI) in 1966.

The station currently operates a D-class (IB1) Inshore lifeboat, Lady Barbara (D-795), on station since 2016.

== History ==
In 1964, in response to an increasing amount of water-based leisure activity, the RNLI placed 25 small fast Inshore lifeboats around the country. These were easily launched with just a few people, ideal to respond quickly to local emergencies.

More stations were opened, and in May 1966, a lifeboat station was established at Flint, with the arrival of a D-class (RFD PB16) Inshore lifeboat, the unnamed (D-37).

At 20:05 on 26 February 1983, the Flint Inshore lifeboat (D-252) was launched to the aid of the cabin cruiser Heron II, in difficulty 1 mile (1.6 km) south east of Mostyn Docks. In dark and difficult conditions, the D-class (Zodiac III) lifeboat arrived to find the boat with the anchor out, but aground and taking on water. Skilfully bringing the lifeboat alongside, two crew had to board the vessel, and carry off one of the survivors, who had collapsed. Helm Robert Alan Forrester was awarded the RNLI Bronze Medal, whilst the two crew were accorded "A Framed Letter of Thanks signed by the Chairman of the Institution".

A new purpose-built boathouse was constructed in 1985. The D-class lifeboat had previously been housed in one of the temporary 'Hardun' type boathouse, in use at many stations since the mid-1960s.

During hurricane force north westerly winds and very high tides in 1990, the Abergele suburb of Pensarn, and the seaside resort of Towyn suffered heavy flooding. Flint lifeboat crew worked 14 hours each day between 26 February and 1 March to help those people stranded, and succeeded in bringing one hundred and eighty people to safety. The station was awarded a special certificate in recognition of the extraordinary efforts made.

On 5 June 1991, local man Graham Oare set out in his 17 ft (5.2 m) open fishing boat, and rescued three fishermen, after their boat capsized and sank off Flint Castle. In a tradition going back to 1824, when any rescuer may be commended by the Institution, Graham Oare received 'A Framed Letter of Thanks, signed by the Chairman of the Institution'.

In 2000, improvements were made to Flint lifeboat station, provided by the £22,000 legacy of Dorothy Bashford, a long-time active member of Sutton Coldfield RNLI ladies guild. A lookout room was constructed, with upgrades to the crew facilities and office.

The new D-class (IB1) Inshore lifeboat Sir Y Flint (D-658) was placed on service on Tuesday 19 December 2006, one of a new class of Inshore lifeboat. This lifeboat had been funded by The Flintshire Lifeboat Appeal.

After serving for 10 years, Sir Y Flint was replaced in 2016 by the Lady Barbara (D-795). This new lifeboat, costing £48,000, was partially funded by a £35,000 donation from local RNLI supporter David Sadler, in memory of his late wife Barbara, who died in 2015.

== Station honours ==
The following are awards made at Flint:

- RNLI Bronze Medal
  Robert Alan Forrester, Helm – 1983
- 'A Framed Letter of Thanks signed by the Chairman of the Institution'
  Denis James Smith, crew member – 1983
  Terrance Henry Jacklin, crew member – 1983
  Mr Graham Oare – 1991
- A Special Framed Certificate
  for service to Towyn and Pensarn during extreme flooding
  Flint Lifeboat Station – 1990
- British Empire Medal
  Robert Alan Forrester, Lifeboat Operations Manager – 2020QBH

== Roll of honour ==
In memory of those lost whilst serving at Flint:

- Suffered a severe stroke during a service launch on 9 April 2001, and died the following day.
  William E. Towers, Deputy Launch Authority and shore helper (60)

== Flint lifeboats ==
=== Inshore lifeboats ===
Op.No. (Note: Op.No. is the RNLI's Operational Number carried on the hull or vehicle.)	Name	On station	Class	Comments
D-37	Unnamed	1966	D-class (RFD PB16)	
D-104	Unnamed	1966–1976	D-class (RFD PB16)	
D-252	Unnamed	1976–1988	D-class (Zodiac III)	
D-361	Tangent I	1988–1996	D-class (EA16)	
D-510	Marjorie Helen	1996–2005	D-class (EA16)	
D-483	C John Morris DFM	2005–2006	D-class (EA16)	
D-505	Arthur Bygraves	2006	D-class (EA16)	
D-658	Sir Y Flint	2006–2016	D-class (IB1)	
D-795	Lady Barbara	2016–	D-class (IB1)	

== See also ==
- List of RNLI stations
- List of former RNLI stations
- Royal National Lifeboat Institution lifeboats
