= Duddon Inshore Rescue =

Search and rescue service in Cumbria, England

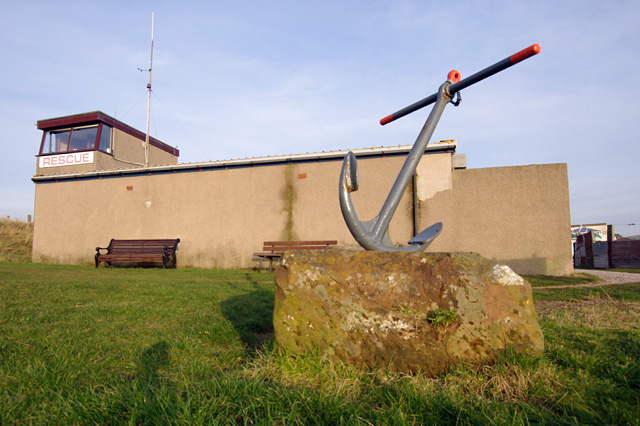
- Duddon Inshore Rescue Station

- Askam-in-Furness, Cumbria

General information
- Type: Lifeboat Station
- Location: Steel Street,, Askam-in-Furness, Cumbria, LA16 7BW, United Kingdom
- Coordinates: 54°11′14.0″N 3°12′46.0″W
- Opened: July 1970
- Inaugurated: 1969

Website
- Duddon Inshore Rescue

Duddon Inshore Rescue (DIR) is located on Steel Street, in Askam-in-Furness, a village on the west coast of Furness Peninsula, overlooking the River Duddon estuary, approximately 7 miles (11 km) north of Barrow-in-Furness, in south-west Cumbria.

This voluntary independent search and rescue (SAR) service was established in 1969, and was set up to rescue people in difficulty, in the tidal estuary of the River Duddon.

Duddon Inshore Rescue currently operates a D-class (IB1) Inshore lifeboat, on station since 2016.

== History ==
After a series of drownings in the Duddon estuary in 1969, a public meeting was held in the village of Askam-in-Furness. With the Barrow RNLI lifeboat station some 40 minutes away, it was decided to establish an Inshore Rescue Service, covering the Duddon estuary, Roanhead sand dunes and nature reserve, and the northern end of Walney Island. Land was donated as a site for a boathouse, and a management committee of 12 people was formed. A small inflatable lifeboat was acquired, and the service was operational from June 1970.

In 1988, DIR would purchase a replacement Inshore lifeboat. The boat, the third to be operated at Duddon, was a D-class lifeboat, costing £5,000.

The following year, in 1989, a cheque for £1,300 was presented to Duddon Inshore Rescue by British Gas, as a thankyou for being available, when a new pipeline was laid across the estuary. The year marked the 20th anniversary of Duddon Inshore Rescue, and engraved plaques was presented to five founder members: chairman Bernard McNamee, Jim Bell, Bill Jinks, Dennis Brown and Robert McGranthin.

A service and blessing was led by Rev. Danny Sanderson, vicar of Askam and Ireleth in 1993, on the arrival of a larger Rigid inflatable lifeboat (RIB), which cost £9,000.

A new Ribcraft 5.85 RIB Inshore lifeboat was acquired in 2006, at a cost of £35,000. The 5.85 m (19.2 ft) RIB was replaced in 2011, with a former RNLI D-class (EA16) Inshore lifeboat.

In 2016, a bequest from a supporter allowed DIR to purchase a new D-class (IB1) Inshore lifeboat, costing £70,000. At a ceremony on Sunday 19 June 2016, the same day as the original first launch in 1970, the new lifeboat was blessed by the Rev. Allan Mitchell, and named Anyon Arthur Kay, whose donation had helped fund the lifeboat.

For the lifetime of the Walney Wind Farm extension project, energy company Ørsted make available £600,000 per annum to grant to local organisations, via the Walney Extension Community Fund. In 2018, a grant to the DIR funded the purchase of a New Holland TD5.85 launch and recovery tractor.

On holiday in 1974, two brothers, Phil and Timothy Boyle, of Chingford, Essex, aged 11 and 12, were rescued by the Duddon Inshore Lifeboat, when they were cut-off by the tide while playing on the sands. In 2022, the two brothers returned to the station, and were honoured to present each of seven of the current Duddon crew, with their Queen Elizabeth II Platinum Jubilee Medal. The medal was awarded to operation members of the emergency services with five years service.

A grant of £25,000 was received in 2022 from the Masonic Charitable Foundation. This allowed the purchase of a new outboard engine for the Inshore lifeboat, along with a new quad bike for shore rescue work.

In June 2023, tributes were paid to local man William (Bill) Jinks, who died age 94, the last surviving member of the original committee of 12. Jinks, who couldn't swim, had once rowed 3 miles (4.8 km) to rescue a man on the marsh at Kirkby-in-Furness.

== Station honours ==
The following are awards made at Askam-in-Furness.

- Member, Order of the British Empire (MBE)

Bernard McNamee, chairman – 2006NYH

== Duddon Inshore Rescue lifeboats ==
Name	On Station	Class	Cost	Comments
Unnamed	1970–????			
Unnamed	????–1988			
Unnamed	1988–1993	D-class	£5,000	
Unnamed	1993–2006	RIB	£9,000	
Duddon Guardian	2006–2011	Ribcraft 5.85	£35,000	
Unnamed	2011–2016	D-class (EA16)		Formerly Barrow RNLI lifeboat (D-567)
Anyon Arthur Kay	2016–	D-class (IB1)	£70,000	

Duddon Inshore Rescue became a registered charity on 13 August 1970 (No. 500045).

== See also ==
- Independent lifeboats in Britain and Ireland
