= Larne Lifeboat Station =

RNLI lifeboat station in County Antrim, Northern Ireland

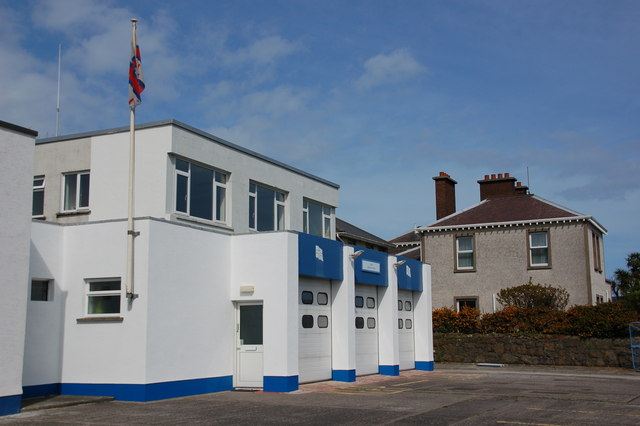
- Larne Lifeboat Station

- Location within Northern Ireland

General information
- Type: RNLI Lifeboat Station
- Location: 17 Olderfleet Rd, Larne, County Antrim, BT40 1AS, Northern Ireland
- Coordinates: 54°50′48.2″N 5°48′00.5″W
- Opened: 26 December 1994
- Owner: Royal National Lifeboat Institution

Website
- Larne RNLI Lifeboat Station

Larne Lifeboat Station is located at Olderfleet Road, in Larne, a port town in County Antrim, sitting on the eastern entrance to Larne Lough, on the east coast of Northern Ireland.

A lifeboat station was first established at Larne on 26 December 1994 by the Royal National Lifeboat Institution (RNLI).

The station currently operates the Shannon-class All-weather lifeboat, 13-58 Machiko Nancy (ON 1365), on station since 2026, and the smaller D-class (IB1) Inshore lifeboat, Terry (D-783), on station since 2015.

== History ==
At the annual meeting of the RNLI on 18 May 1995 at the Barbican Center in London, it was announced that 10 stations had been established in the previous year. It was felt that one place had particular need for the placement of a lifeboat, which was at Larne in Northern Ireland. The station at Larne was established with the arrival of the D-class (EA16) Inshore lifeboat Michel Philippe Wolvers (D-326) on 26 September 1994.

Just six months later, on 19 March 1995, the station saw the arrival of their temporary All-weather lifeboat, the Waveney-class 44-022 The William and Jane (ON 1079), previously on service at Blyth, and named after the parents of one of the donors, the late Miss Mabel Hewson.

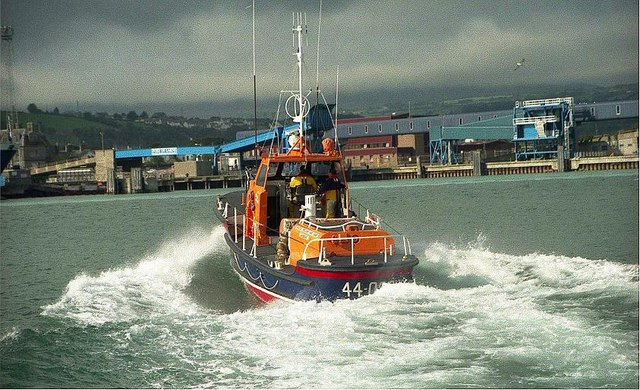
Waveney-class 44-022 The William and Jane (ON 1079)

A permanent Inshore lifeboat was placed at the station on 8 June 1996. The lifeboat was funded by long-time RNLI supporter Mrs Jean Cudby, formerly of Belfast, and named Jean and Paul (D-499) in memory of her late husband.

The temporary Waveney-class lifeboat remained on station until 11 November 1997, when she was replaced by another temporary boat, the larger 52-foot Arun-class lifeboat 52-15 Hyman Winstone (ON 1067), which had previously been stationed at Holyhead and at Ballycotton.

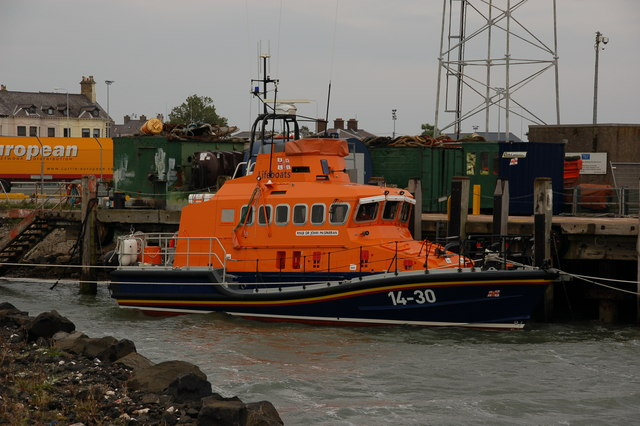
Larne Trent-class lifeboat, 14-30 Dr. John McSparran (ON 1246)

A new floating berth for the All-weather lifeboat was constructed and completed in May 2000, in time for the arrival of Larne's permanent lifeboat. On 3 August, a new Trent-class All-weather lifeboat 14-30 Dr. John McSparran (ON 1246) arrived on station. At a ceremony at East Antrim Boat Club on Saturday 30 September 2000, funded from the legacy of the late Mrs Margaret McSparran, the lifeboat was named in memory of her brother, Dr. John Gerard McSparran.

In 2015, the station received its latest Inshore lifeboat. The lifeboat was funded by the 'Pistol Benefit Fund', set up in memory of Frederick Pistol (Fred), a wartime refugee from Austria, and later Army Major, and his wife Theresa (Terry), a former concert pianist born in Westcliff-on-Sea, both keen sailors, and passionate supporters of the RNLI. At a naming ceremony in September 2015, attended by members of the Pistol family, following Fred's tradition of naming all his boats after his wife, the lifeboat was named Terry (D-783).

The 200th anniversary of the RNLI, and the 30th anniversary of operations at Larne Lifeboat Station, were celebrated with an open day on 22 June 2024.

Seven of the Larne lifeboat crew attended the RNLI All-weather lifeboat centre in Poole on 21 October 2025, for the official launch of their new Shannon-class lifeboat 13-58 Machiko Nancy (ON 1365). Funded primarily by Michael Cameron, via the Cameron Family Charitable Foundation, the lifeboat is named in memory of the late wife of the donor, who died in 2020.

Following a period of training, 13-58 Machiko Nancy (ON 1365) entered service in February 2026. The lifeboat was formally named at a ceremony at the East Antrim Boat Club on Saturday 18 July 2026.

== Larne lifeboats ==
=== All-weather lifeboats ===
ON (Note: ON is the RNLI's Official Number of the boat.)	Op.No. (Note: Op. No. is the RNLI's Operational Number of the boat carried on the hull.)	Name	Built	On station	Class	Comments
1079	44-022	The William and Jane	1982	1995–1997	Waveney	Previously at Blyth.
1067	52-15	Hyman Winstone	1980	1997–2000	Arun	Previously at Holyhead and Ballycotton.
1246	14-30	Dr. John McSparran	2000	2000–2026	Trent	
1365	13-58	Machiko Nancy	2025	2026–	Shannon	

More post-service details can be found on the respective lifeboat class pages.

=== Inshore lifeboats ===
==== D class ====
Op.No.	Name	On station	Class	Comments
D-326	Michel Philippe Wolvers	1994–1995	D-class (EA16)	
D-439	Phyllis Mary	1995–1996	D-class (EA16)	
D-499	Jean and Paul	1996–2005	D-class (EA16)	
D-646	Hannabella Ferguson	2005–2015	D-class (IB1)	
D-783	Terry	2015–	D-class (IB1)	

== See also ==
- List of RNLI stations
- List of former RNLI stations
- Royal National Lifeboat Institution lifeboats
