= RNLI Inshore Lifeboat Centre =

RNLI lifeboat build and repair centre

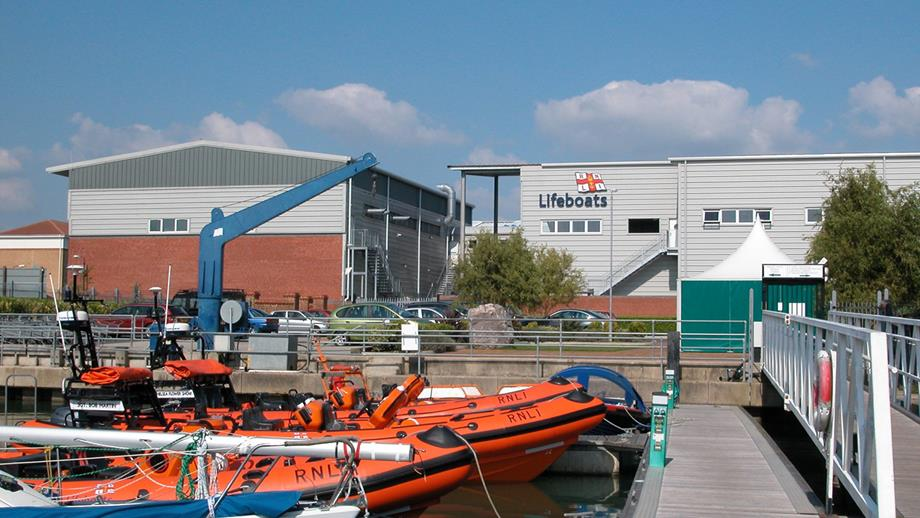
- Inshore Lifeboat Centre

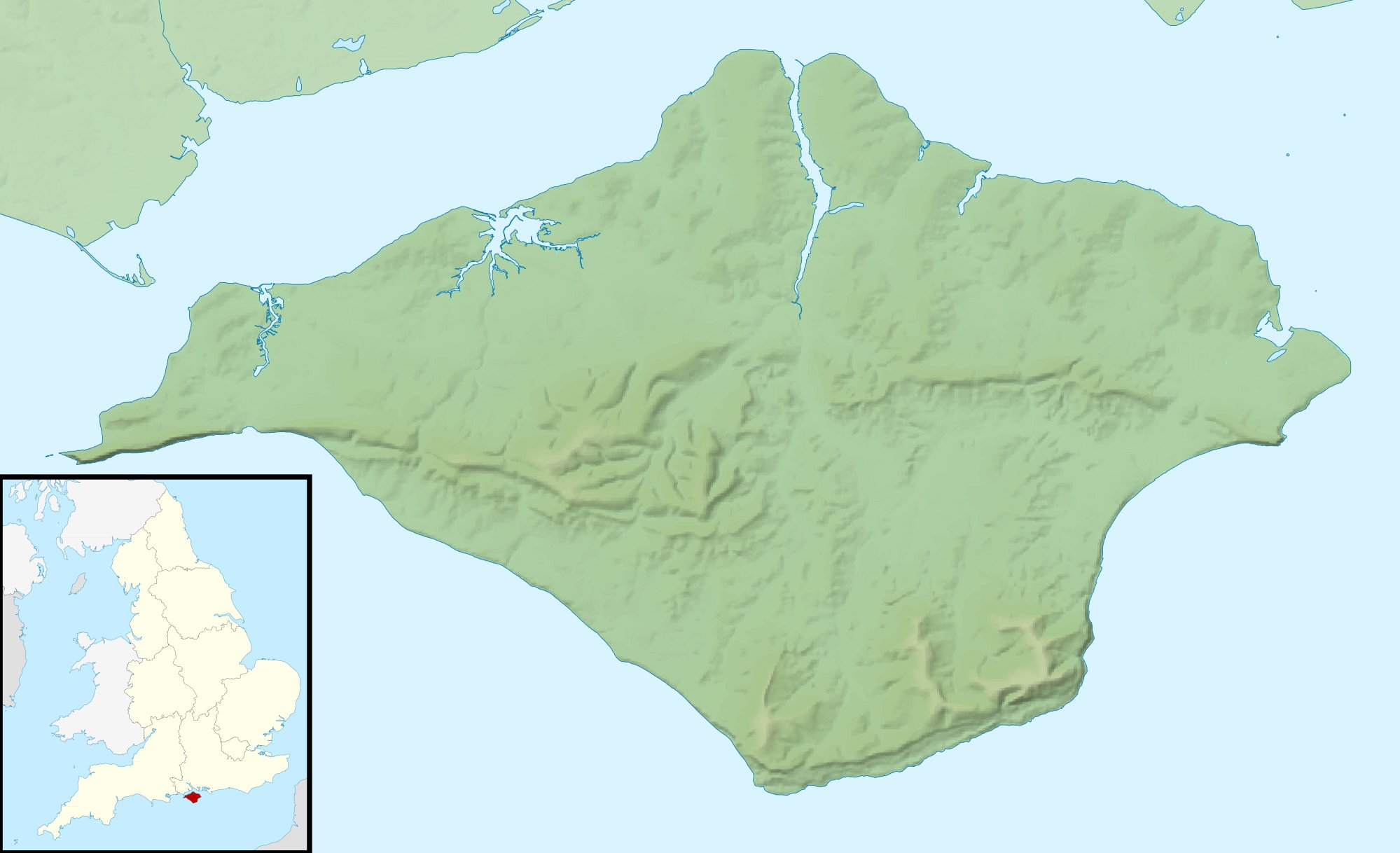
- Location within Isle of Wight
- Former names: Inshore Rescue Boat Centre

General information
- Type: RNLI Lifeboat Centre
- Location: Clarence Rd, East Cowes, Isle of Wight, PO32 6HB, United Kingdom
- Coordinates: 50°45′05.0″N 1°17′21.8″W
- Opened: 1967
- Owner: Royal National Lifeboat Institution

Website
- Inshore Lifeboat Centre

The RNLI Inshore Lifeboat Centre (ILC) is located on Clarence Road, in East Cowes, a town on the eastern shore of the River Medina on the Isle of Wight, England.

The facility opened in 1967, and is the design, build and maintenance centre for the fleet of Inshore lifeboats operated by the Royal National Lifeboat Institution (RNLI).

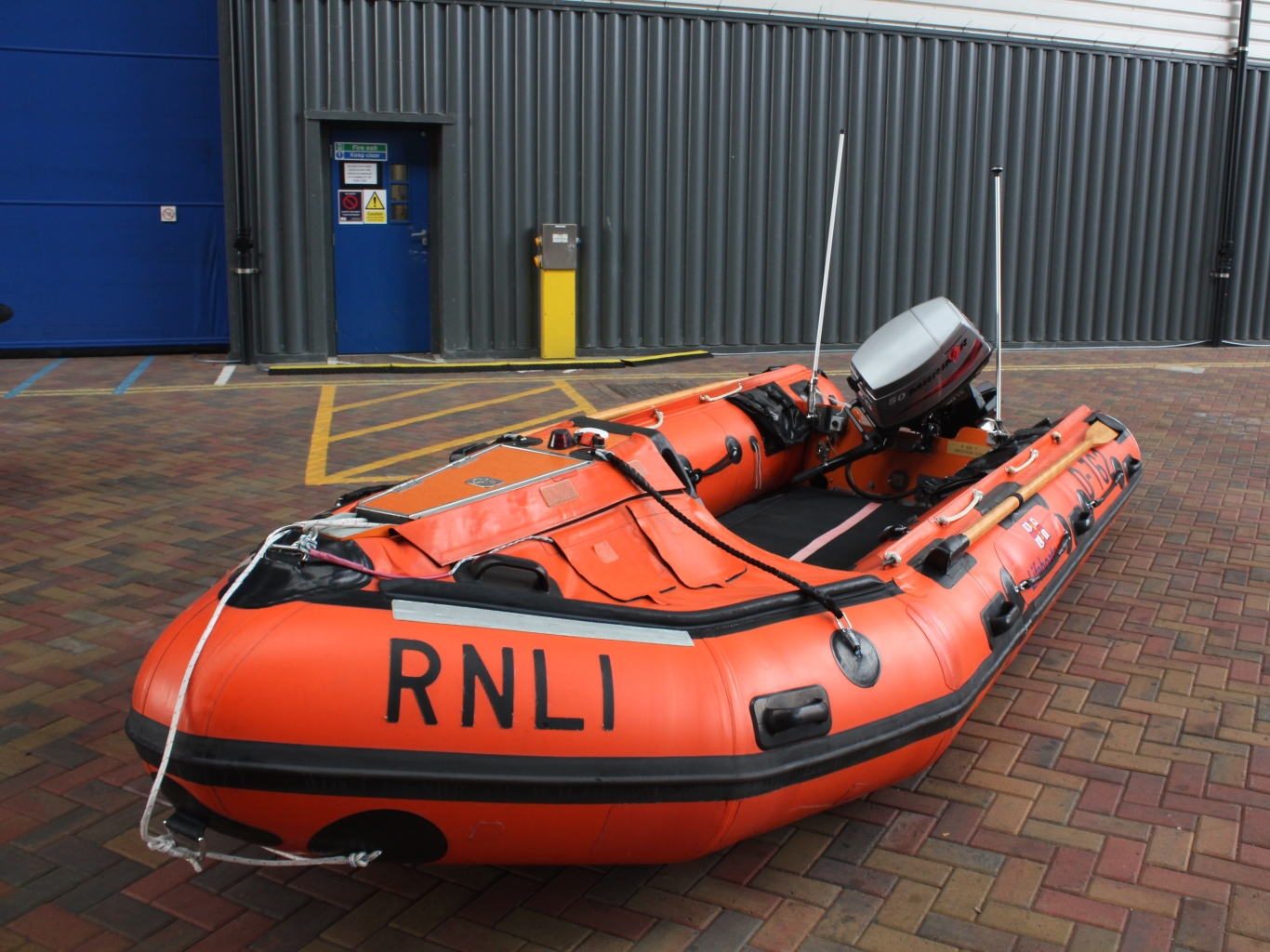
D-class (IB1) M & P Anderson-Vick (D-762)

The Inshore Lifeboat Centre is currently building and maintaining the D-class (IB1) and B-class (Atlantic 85) Inshore lifeboats, rescue craft for the RNLI lifeguard teams, and the E-class lifeboats operated on the River Thames. A revised fourth-generation Atlantic class boat is due in 2026.

As of October 2025, the ILC is under threat of closure in 2027, with production and maintenance to be transferred to the RNLI HQ in Poole.

== History ==
In 1962, the number of rescues or attempted rescues by All-weather lifeboats in the summer months was 98, with the number of lives rescued being 133. In 1963, in response to an increasing amount of water-based leisure activity, the RNLI began trials of small fast Inshore lifeboats, placed at various locations around the country. These were easily launched with just a few people, ideal to respond quickly to local emergencies. This quickly proved to be very successful. In 1963, there were 226 rescues or attempted rescues in the summer months, as a result of which 225 lives were saved.

Since 1914, the RNLI had employed surveyors and overseers at East Cowes to work closely with lifeboat manufactures such as S. E. Saunders and J. Samuel White, to ensure that building standards and specifications were being met. A permanent office was constructed in 1930, providing staff facilities, and a storage facility for records, drawings, patterns and other equipment.

Following the deployment of the small Inshore lifeboats, it quickly became apparent that a repair and development centre would be required to service and maintain the fast growing fleet of boats.

In the late 1960s, the former Trinity House Pilot Service offices at East Cowes, adjacent to the RNLI premises, were vacated, and subsequently acquired by the Institution. This provided the ideal location for maintaining the new fleet, in an environment synonymous with boat building, where the required human resources could be found. Mr. P. A. Rakestrow was appointed as Overseer (Cowes) in charge, and he is credited with the early success of the "Inshore Rescue Boat Centre", as it was initially known, laying the foundations for today's operations.

=== 1970s ===
The primary role of the Inshore Rescue Boat Centre in the early days was to undertake the major repairs of boats and engines; the minor repairs taking place at the RNLI depot at Boreham Wood. Four highly skilled women were employed to tailor and glue the heavy skin fabric of the Inshore boats. Repairs to the woodwork and floors were undertaken by two boat builders, who also set up the boats for trials. Speed trials were carried out on a measured half-mile (0.80 km) on the Medina River. In addition to dealing with the Inshore lifeboats, the centre was also responsible for the maintenance of the 17–18 ft (5.2–5.5 m) 'Offshore' fast rescue boats.

=== Engines ===
For the first few years, the deployment of the Inshore lifeboats was seasonal. The majority of the four types of outboard engine were 'traded-in' each year with the manufacturers agent. Each engine would need the usual RNLI special fittings installed and testing prior to the spring deployment, and then removed at the end of the season. Each mechanic was tasked with servicing about 150 engines per year. 15 engines a week could be tested in the test tank.

=== Development Work ===
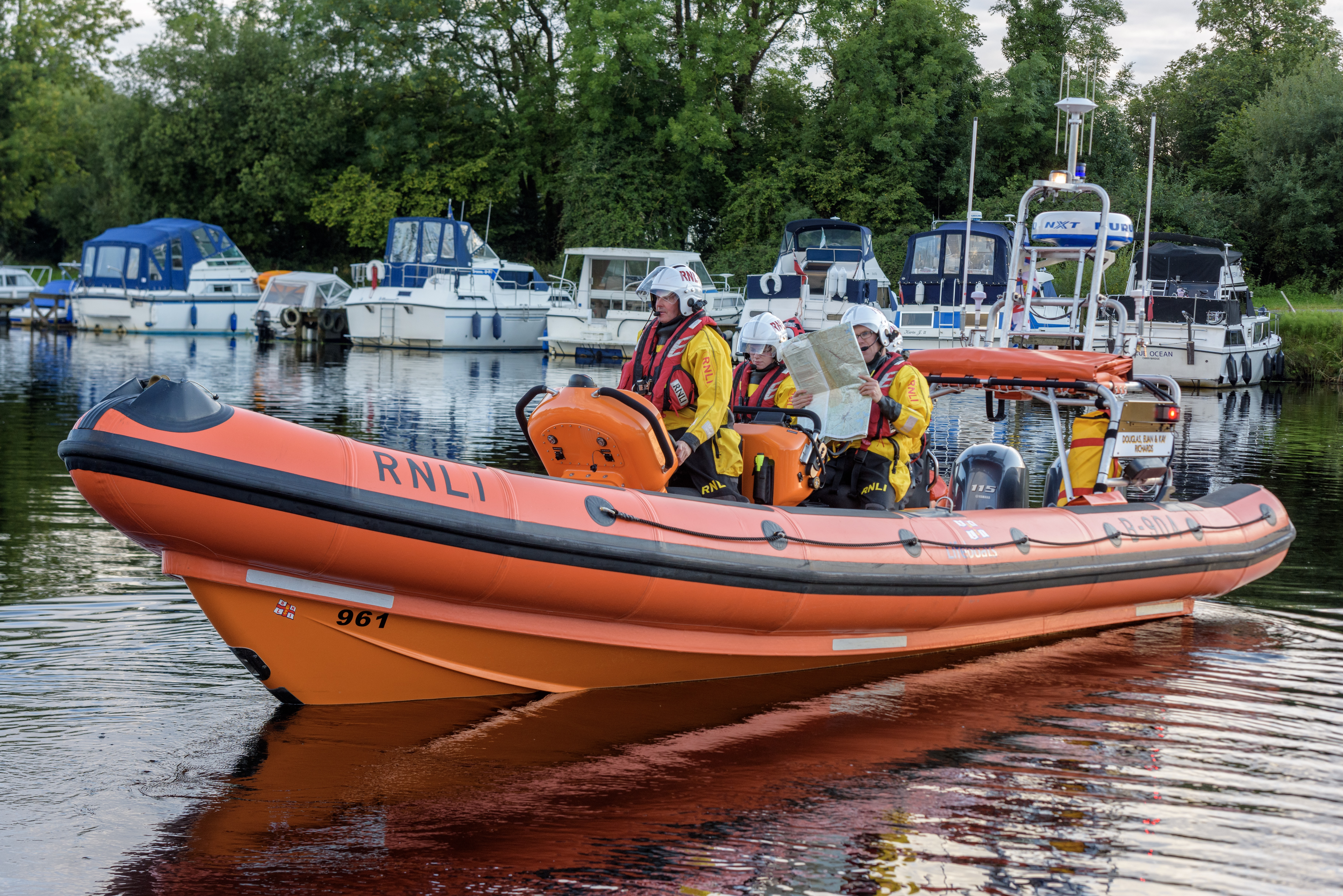
B-class (Atlantic 85) Douglas Euan & Kay Richards (B-904)

In the early 1970s, development work along side a team at Atlantic College resulted in the production of the Atlantic 21 Rigid inflatable boat (1971), subsequently evolving into the Atlantic 75 (1993), and since 2004, the Atlantic 85. The centre was also instrumental in the development of the Medina-class offshore lifeboat under the leadership of David Stogdon, MBE.

Design work continues to improve layout, floor designs, engine controls, seating and other fittings. 2026 will see the introduction of the new fourth generation Atlantic class lifeboats.

== Present Day ==
The Inshore Lifeboat Visitor and Heritage Centre was officially opened by HRH Princess Anne in 2018, presenting the history of the ILC and the RNLI on the Isle of Wight. Guided tours are available every Tuesday.

A team of up to 70 highly skilled workers are now employed at the ILC; including boatbuilders, fitters and electricians, and build and maintain up to 80 boats every year. Facilities across the three buildings include a dedicated laminating shop, machine shop, welding bay and spray booth.

== Closure ==
In October 2025, the RNLI announced intentions to close the Inshore Lifeboat Centre at the end of 2027, bringing production to the RNLI HQ at Poole, citing that the existing buildings would need a £5m investment to bring them to current compliance requirements. A period of consultation is expected to conclude in 2026.

In January 2026, the RNLI were censured by Unite regional co-ordinating officer Jamie Major, following the Institution's refusal to formally recognise the union at its Cowes base. "It is deeply disappointing that an organisation such as the RNLI is choosing to go down this route of refusing to recognise Unite and deploying tactics to avoid giving its hardworking staff a voice. Unite has no choice but to begin the formal legal process to ensure our members have proper representation and leverage over what happens to their jobs, pay and conditions - especially given the current situation which has left these workers with huge uncertainty around their futures."

== See also ==
- Atlantic 85-class lifeboat
- D-class lifeboat (IB1)
- E-class lifeboat
