= Criccieth Lifeboat Station =

RNLI lifeboat station in Gwynedd, Wales

- Gorsaf Bad Achub Criccieth
- Flag of the RNLI

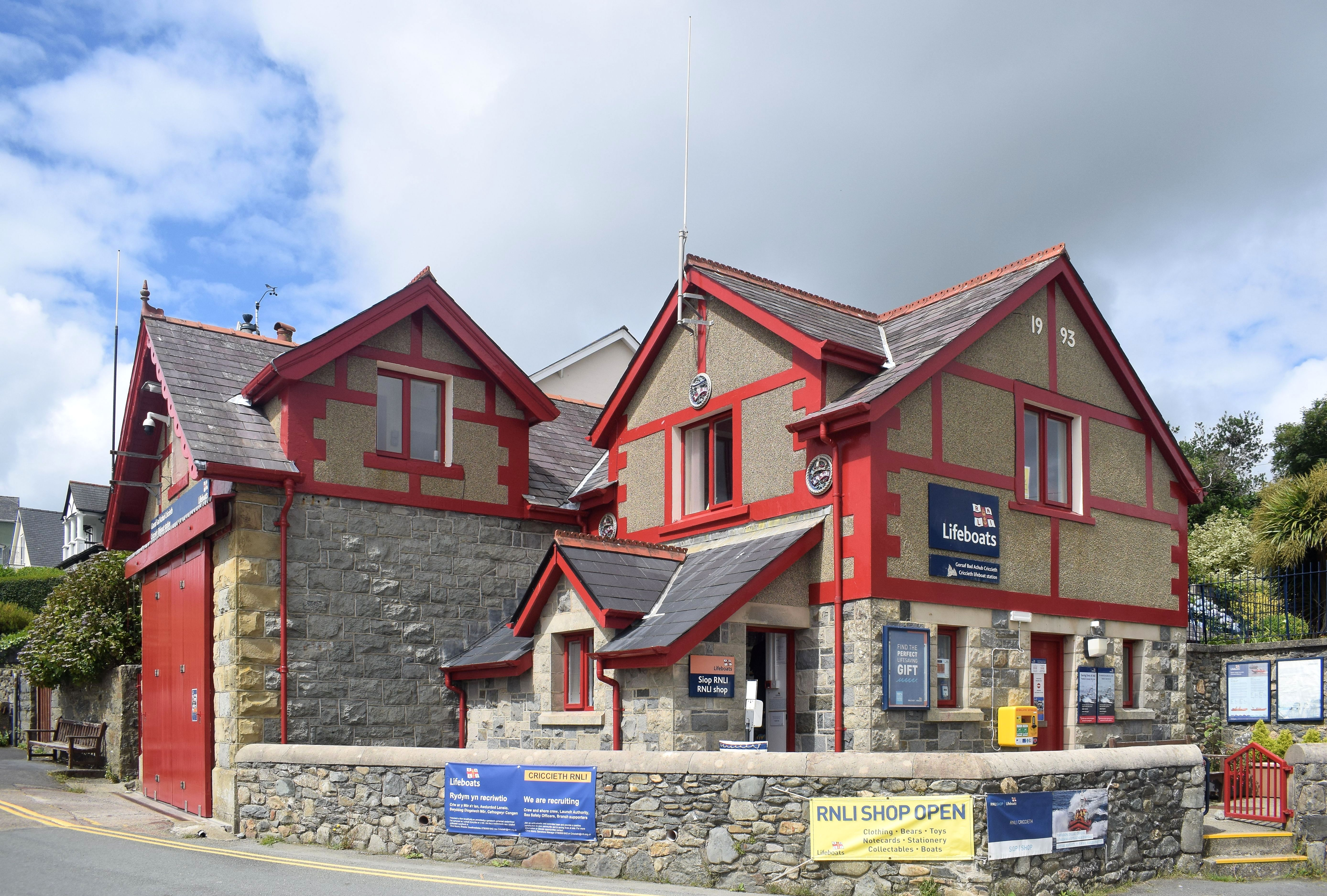
- Criccieth Lifeboat Station in 2022

- Location within Gwynedd
- Former names: Portmadoc Lifeboat Station

General information
- Type: Lifeboat station
- Location: Lôn Felin, Criccieth, Gwynedd, LL52 0DN, United Kingdom
- Coordinates: 52.918083°N 4.230500°W
- Opened: 1853
- Owner: Royal National Lifeboat Institution

Website
- Criccieth RNLI Lifeboat Station

Criccieth Lifeboat Station (Welsh: Gorsaf Bad Achub Criccieth) can be found on Lôn Felin, in Criccieth, a town and seaside resort sitting on the northern shore of Cardigan Bay, just to the east of the Llŷn Peninsula, approximately 17 mi (27 km) due south of Caernarfon, in the county of Gwynedd in North Wales.

The lifeboat station was established as Portmadoc Lifeboat Station in 1853 by the Shipwrecked Fishermen and Mariners’ Royal Benevolent Society (SFMRBS), although its exact location, either in Porthmadog or Criccieth, is not known. In 1854, management of the station was transferred to the Royal National Lifeboat Institution (RNLI), with the lifeboat operating from Criccieth.

The station currently operates a B-class (Atlantic 85) Inshore lifeboat, Frank Townley (B-938), on station since 2023, and a much smaller Arancia-class lifeboat, Margaret and Nantw (A-76), on station since 2011.

== History ==
In 1851, the president of the Royal National Institution for the Preservation of Life from Shipwreck (RNIPLS), The Duke of Northumberland, offered a prize of 100 guineas for the best design for a self-righting lifeboat. The prize was won by boat-builder Mr James Beeching of Great Yarmouth.

As a result of this award, several of the Beeching "Northumberland Prize" lifeboats were ordered by the Shipwrecked Fishermen and Mariners’ Royal Benevolent Society (SFMRBS), being dispatched to their existing or new stations. A 30-foot (9.1 m) lifeboat, Dauntless, with 10 oars and two sails, arrived at Porthmadog by rail on 30 September 1852.

The following day, 1 October 1852, the lifeboat was trialled by Mr Jackson, Surveyor of H.M. Customs, along with five Portmadoc boatmen. A sudden gust hit the large lug-sail, pushing the boat over onto her beam ends, and she ultimately capsized, failing to self-right. The crew were fortunate to be rescued by other local craft. On the same day, the Beeching lifeboat at Lytham, another of the SFMRBS stations, also capsized during training, with the loss of eight lives.

Despite the capsize, Portmadoc Lifeboat Station was formally established, when Dauntless took up duties on station in January 1853.

On 23 January 1853, another disaster involving a Beeching lifeboat occurred at Rhyl, the third SFMRBS station to encounter problems. The lifeboat capsized, failed to self-right, and a further six crew were lost. A damning report published in "The Lifeboat", dated 1 December 1852, but apparently published after the Rhyl disaster, highlighted the fact that although both boats carried a brass plaque with "Northumberland Prize Boat", neither had been constructed to the same design or standards.

The SFMRBS placed an order with Forrestt of Limehouse, for a new 28 ft (8.5 m) Peake-class self-righting boat for Rhyl, but the crew there had lost all confidence in self-righting lifeboats, and declined the new boat. Rhyl ultimately received one of the new-design Tubular-class lifeboats in 1856. The new unnamed boat was instead sent to Portmadoc, arriving in May 1854, where it was unofficially, and incorrectly, referred to as the First Lifeboat. The Dauntless was sent to the Forrestt boatyard, where it was modified to the Peake design, later seeing service at Wicklow.

By 1854, the SFMRBS was involved in the management of eight lifeboat stations, Lytham, Rhyl, Hornsea, Tenby, Llanelli, Teignmouth, Newhaven and Portmadoc. On 7 December 1854, an agreement was made between the SFMRBS and the RNLI, where the former would concentrate on the welfare of those rescued, whilst the latter would be involved in lifeboats, stations and rescues. Management of all eight stations was transferred to the RNLI.

The First Lifeboat was retained by the RNLI, launching 14 times, and saving 53 lives. It was replaced in 1867 by the much larger 34 ft (10 m) John Ashbury, which had been conveyed free of charge to Ynyslas by the Great Western and Cambrian Railway companies, from where it was sailed and rowed to its station.

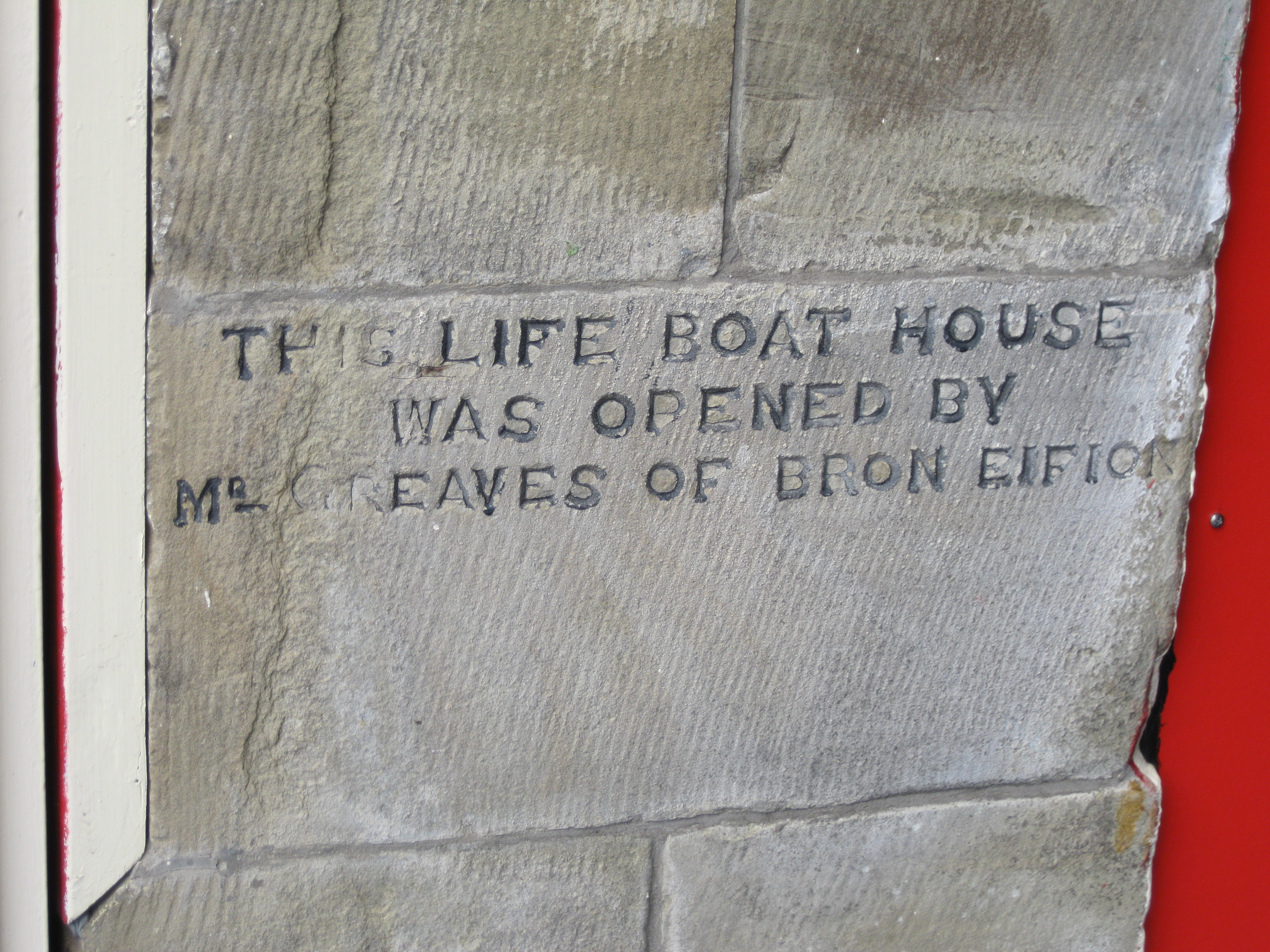

Construction of a new boathouse began in 1892, being completed in 1893, at a cost of £600. The station was renamed Criccieth Lifeboat Station. The boathouse was formally opened by John Ernest Greaves of Bron Eifion, Criccieth, Lord Lieutenant of Caernarvonshire, owner of slate mines, including the Llechwedd quarry in Blaenau Ffestiniog, and branch president of Criccieth RNLI.

Following an exercise on 26 July 1910, the 24-year-old Criccieth lifeboat Caroline (ON 65) was condemned, and removed from service. A temporary replacement lifeboat, Reserve No. 7 (ON 275), formerly James and Caroline at St Agnes, IOS, arrived at the station on 8 August, whereon the Caroline was broken up.

On Thursday 13 October 1910, signals of distress were seen from two fishing boats, Venus and Helena. During the launch of the temporary Criccieth lifeboat, one man was washed overboard, but was recovered. At the time, several large boulders made launching the lifeboat difficult, especially into a north-east wind, and as the lifeboat tried to get away, she was washed into the boulders. A quick inspection didn't reveal the damage caused, and with the assistance of the large crowd that had gathered on the shore, the lifeboat was dragged up the beach and re-launched.

The Helena foundered, but her crew managed to get aboard the Venus, and both crews were rescued by the Pwllheli lifeboat. The Criccieth lifeboat, which had been waterlogged since launch, turned on her beam ends every time the sails were raised. Ultimately four crew were washed overboard, including the Coxswain, but fortunately, all regained the lifeboat. The lifeboat was beached close to the Dwyfor estuary, with all the crew being helped ashore. A subsequent inspection proved the lifeboat had been badly damaged, and the 21-year-old boat was condemned and broken up, shortly after her return to London.

A second replacement lifeboat, Reserve No. 4C, previously Jane Hannah MacDonald at Appledore, was dispatched to Criccieth. In 1911, the boulders were removed, at a cost of £130.

=== Closure and reopening ===
Criccieth lifeboat station closed in 1931, when a motor lifeboat was stationed at Pwllheli, but over the years, gradual silting of the Pwllheli harbour entrance meant that the 46ft Watson-class lifeboat, which was moored afloat, ultimately couldn't get out at dead-low water. On 3 September 1951, a school master and four boys drowned, after their boat Dorothy capsized, and the Pwllheli lifeboat couldn't attend. The Pwllheli lifeboat was subsequently replaced with a smaller carriage-launched boat, housed in the 1891 boathouse, which could then be transported, and launched off the beach in various locations. Criccieth lifeboat station was also reopened, with its own motor lifeboat arriving on station in 1953.

=== 1960s onwards ===
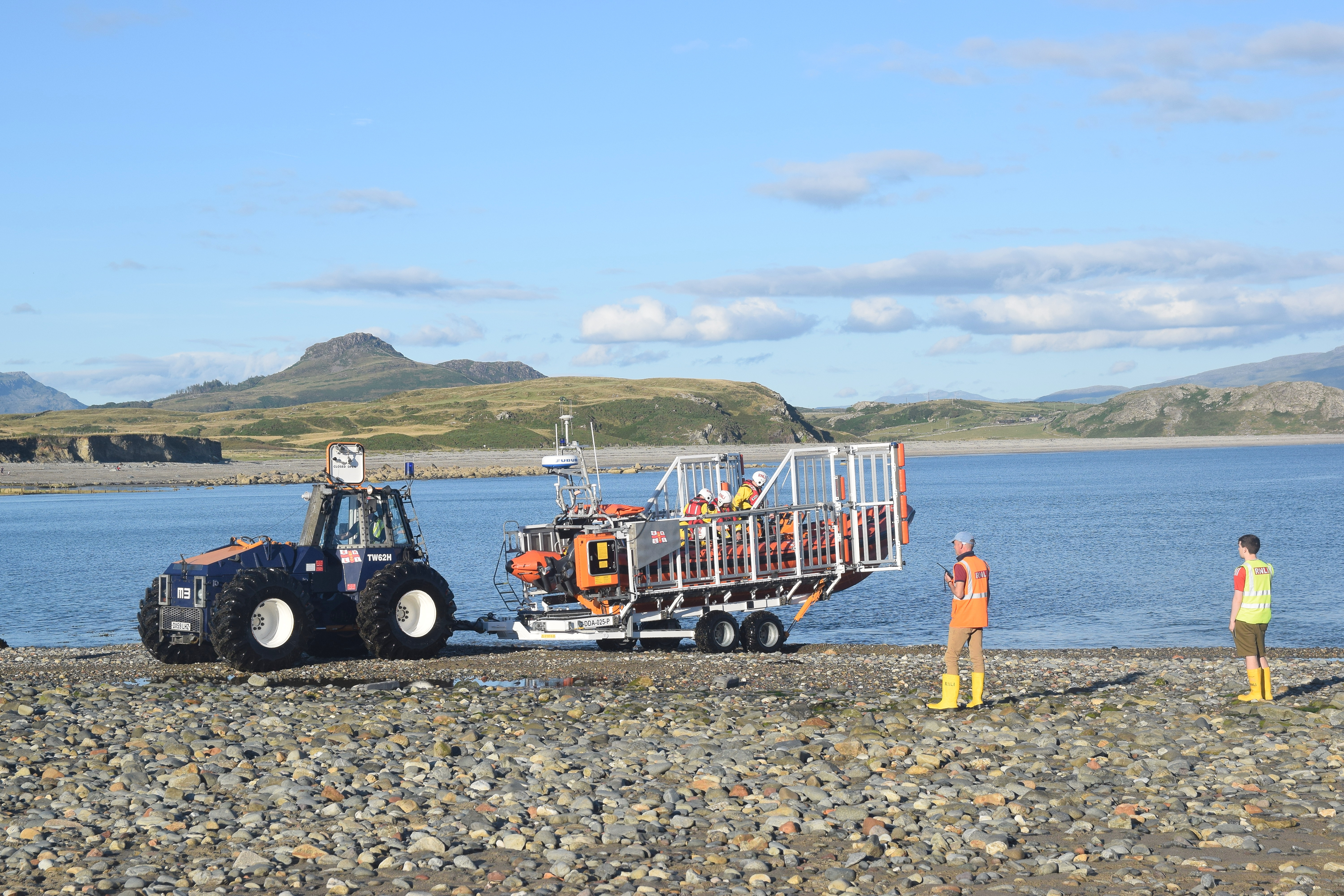
Criccieth B-class (Atlantic 85) lifeboat Doris Joan (B-823) during launch in 2022

In 1964, in response to an increasing amount of water-based leisure activity, the RNLI placed 25 small fast D-class Inshore lifeboats around the country. These were easily launched with just a few people, ideal to respond quickly to local emergencies. An unnamed D-class (RFD PB16) Inshore lifeboat (D-117) was placed at Criccieth in 1967.

Following a coastal review, started in 1965, taking into consideration 11 years of data, and the success of the Inshore lifeboat, it was decided to withdraw the All-weather lifeboat from Criccieth in 1968.

On 1 September 1977, Criccieth Inshore lifeboat (D-140) was launched into rough seas and a strong wind, to the aid of a 22 ft (6.7 m) yacht Zircon, aground on Portmadoc Bar. Working in conjunction with the Pwllheli lifeboat in difficult conditions, Criccieth lifeboat managed to rescue all four people aboard. Helm James Owen, and crew members Robert Williams and Kenneth Roberts, were each accorded 'The Thanks of the Institution inscribed on Vellum'.

Since 1983, larger and faster ILBs have been stationed at Criccieth, initially the twin-engined C-class (Zodiac Grand Raid IV), and from 1993, the much larger Atlantic-class RIB. The boathouse was extended to the rear in 1993, to accommodate the Atlantic 21-class lifeboat and launching tractor, and a side extension was constructed to include a souvenir sales outlet, a workshop, and improved crew facilities.

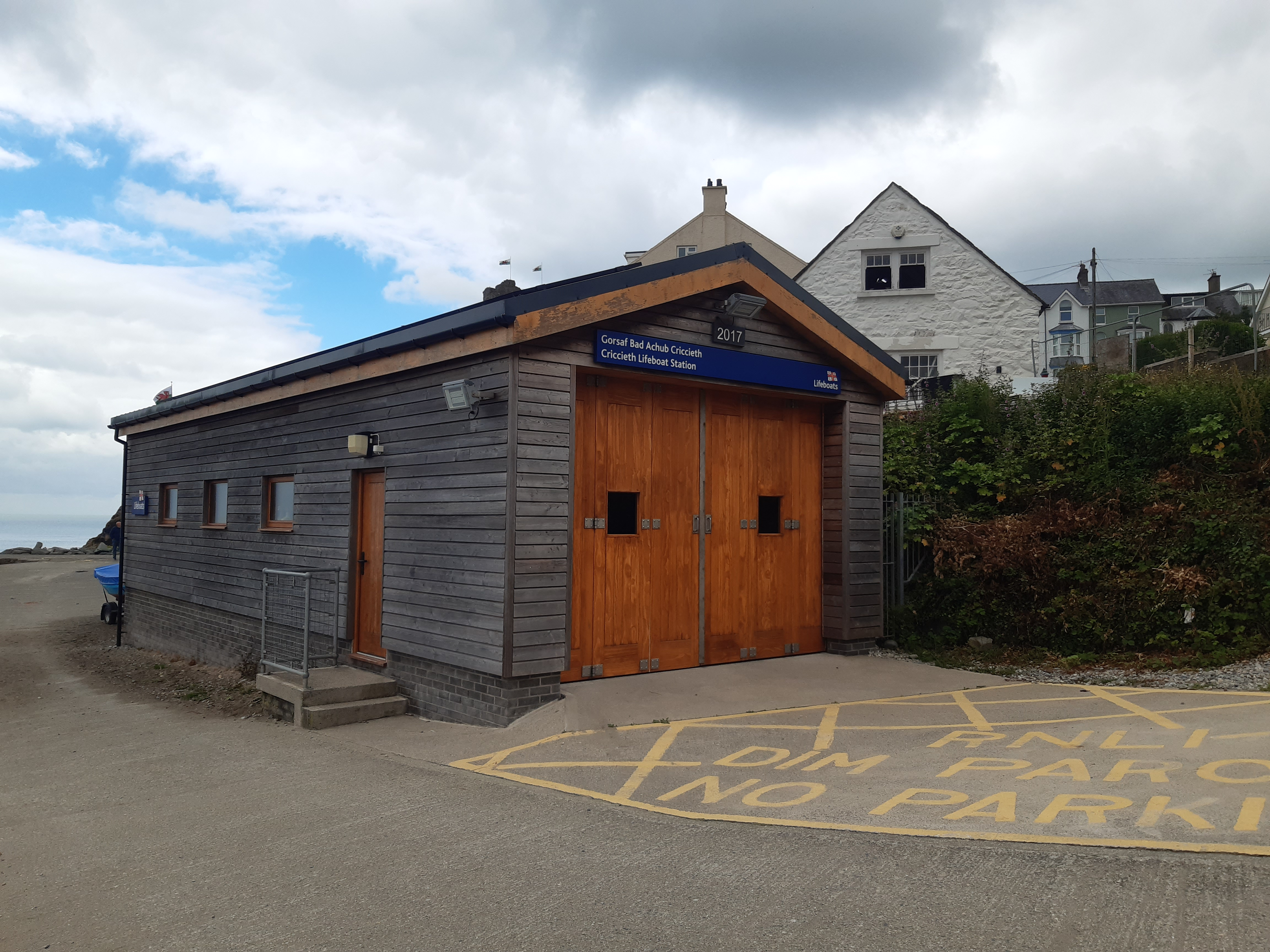
Additional boathouse housing the Arancia-class lifeboat and launch vehicle

In 2009, it was decided to additionally operate the much smaller Arancia-class Inshore lifeboat, of the type more usually used by beach lifeguards, primarily to allow easier access to the shallower parts of the Glaslyn and Dwyryd estuaries.

An additional boathouse to house the Arancia-class lifeboat and launch vehicle was formally opened on the shore in 2018, replacing a storage container.

The B-class (Atlantic 85) Inshore lifeboat Frank Townley (B-938) was placed on service at Criccieth in 2023, replacing the long-serving Doris Joan (B-823), which had been on station since 2007.

== Station honours ==
The following are awards made at Criccieth:

- RNLI Silver Medal
  John Roberts – 1856
- 'The Thanks of the Institution inscribed on Vellum'
  James Owen, Helm – 1977
  Kenneth Roberts, crew member – 1977
  Robert Williams, crew member – 1977
- 'A Framed Letter of Thanks signed by the Chairman of the Institution'
  William Walker-Jones, Helm – 1994
- Letter of Appreciation, signed by the Director of the Institution
  Kevin Owen, Helm – 2000
- Set of Binoculars, presented by the RNLI committee of management
  David Homfrey, Honorary Secretary – 1886

== Criccieth lifeboats ==
=== Pulling and Sailing lifeboats ===
On station	ON (Note: ON is the RNLI's Official Number of the boat.)	Name	Built	Class	Comments
1853–1854	Pre-249	Dauntless	1852	30-foot Beeching self-righting (P&S)	(Note: 30 ft 0 in (9.14 m) x 7 ft 6 in (2.29 m) (10-oared) Beeching-class self-righting lifeboat, funded by the SFMRBS, built by James Beeching of Great Yarmouth, costing £133.); SFMRBS lifeboat. Removed for modification, later saw service at Wicklow.
1854–1867	Pre-280	Unnamed	1854	28-foot Peake self-righting (P&S)	(Note: 28 ft 0 in (8.53 m) x 7 ft 8 in (2.34 m) (10-oared) Peake-class self-righting (P&S) lifeboat, funded by the SFMRBS, built by Forrestt of Limehouse, London, costing £140.); SFMRBS lifeboat. Known as the First Lifeboat. Lengthened to 34 ft (10 m) in 1859. Sold in 1867.
1867–1886	Pre-504	John Ashbury	1867	34-foot self-righting (P&S)	(Note: 34 ft 0 in (10.36 m) x 8 ft 0 in (2.44 m) (10-oared) self-righting (P&S) lifeboat, legacy of Mr James Ashbury of Manchester, built by Forrestt of Limehouse, London, costing £300.); Broken up in 1886.
1886–1910	65	Caroline	1886	34-foot self-righting (P&S)	(Note: 34 ft 0 in (10.36 m) x 7 ft 6 in (2.29 m) (10-oared) self-righting (P&S) lifeboat, legacy of Miss C. C. Lamb of Clifton, built by Woolfe of Shadwell, London, costing £297.); Broken up in 1910.
1910	275	Reserve No. 7	1889	34-foot self-righting (P&S)	(Note: 34 ft 0 in (10.36 m) x 7 ft 6 in (2.29 m) (10-oared) self-righting (P&S) lifeboat, legacy of Mr J. Goss of Stratford Green, built by Woolfe of Shadwell, London, costing £460.); Previously James and Caroline at St Agnes, IOS. Damaged on service in 1910, and broken up in 1911.
1910–1911	348	Reserve No. 4C	1893	34-foot self-righting (P&S)	(Note: 34 ft 0 in (10.36 m) x 8 ft 0 in (2.44 m) (10-oared) self-righting (P&S) lifeboat, gift of Mr and Mrs J. L. Roget of Maida Hill, built by Forrestt of Limehouse, London, costing £423. Further funded in 1907 from Mrs MacDonald of Brighton.); Previously Elinor Roget at Clovelly and Jane Hannah MacDonald at Appledore. Returned t the relief fleet, later at Cemlyn.
1911–1931	624	Phillip Woolley	1911	35-foot Rubie-class self-righting (P&S)	(Note: 35 ft 0 in (10.67 m) x 8 ft 10 in (2.69 m) (10-oared) Rubie-class self-righting (P&S) lifeboat, legacy of Mr P. Woolley of Reigate, built by Thames Ironworks of Blackwall, London, costing £983.); Sold in 1935. Last reported as the yacht Black Swan at Teddington, December 1991.

Station closed 1931
Pre ON numbers are unofficial numbers used by the Lifeboat Enthusiasts' Society to reference early lifeboats not included on the official RNLI list.

=== Motor lifeboats ===
On station	ON	Name	Built	Class	Comments
1953–1961	794	Richard Silver Oliver	1937	Liverpool	Previously at Cullercoats, Newquay and Ilfracombe.
1961–1968	874	Robert Lindsay	1950	Liverpool	Previously at Arbroath and Girvan.

More post-service details can be found on the respective lifeboat class pages.

=== Inshore lifeboats ===
==== D class ====
On station	Op.No. (Note: Op.No. is the RNLI's Operational Number of the boat carried on the hull.)	Name	Class	Comments
1967–1971	D-117	Unnamed	D-class (RFD PB16)	
1972–1974	D-207	Unnamed	D-class (Zodiac III)	
1974–1980	D-140	Unnamed	D-class (RFD PB16)	First stationed at Aberystwyth in 1967.
1980–1983	D-272	Unnamed	D-class (Zodiac III)	

==== B class and C class ====
On station	Op.No.	Name	Class	Comments
1983–1991	C-510	Unnamed	C-class (Zodiac Grand Raid IV)	Initially numbered D-510.
1991–1993	C-523	British Diver IV	C-class (Zodiac Grand Raid IV)	Initially deployed in the relief fleet in 1990.
1993	C-513	Sebag of Jersey	C-class (Zodiac Grand Raid IV)	First stationed at St Catherine in 1984.
1993–1994	B-531	Foresters	B-class (Atlantic 21)	First stationed at Great Yarmouth and Gorleston in 1975.
1994–2007	B-707	Mercurius	B-class (Atlantic 75)	
2007–2023	B-823	Doris Joan	B-class (Atlantic 85)	
2023–	B-938	Frank Townley	B-class (Atlantic 85)	

==== Arancia class ====
On station	Op.No.	Name	Class	Comments
2009–2010	A-70	Unnamed	Arancia	
2010–2011	A-73	Unnamed	Arancia	
2011–	A-76	Margaret and Nantw	Arancia	

=== Launch and recovery tractors ===
On station	Op.No.	Reg. No.	Type	Comments
1953–1958	T45	KGJ 58	Case LA	
1958–1962	T36	FYM 853	Case L	
1962–1964	T31	FGU 821	Case L	
1964–1968	T77	BGO 681B	Case 1000D	
1986–1992	T77	BGO 681B	Case 1000D	
1992–1997	TW11	B251 HUX	Talus MB-764 County	
1997–2003	TW36Hc	N805 XUJ	Talus MB-4H Hydrostatic (Mk2)	
2003–2013	TW58Hc	DX53 VRF	Talus MB-4H Hydrostatic (Mk2)	
2013–	TW62Hb	DX59 LHZ	Talus MB-4H Hydrostatic (Mk1.5)	

== See also ==
- List of RNLI stations
- List of former RNLI stations
- Royal National Lifeboat Institution lifeboats
- Talus Atlantic 85 DO-DO launch carriage
