= XP-class lifeboat =

Class of lifeboat

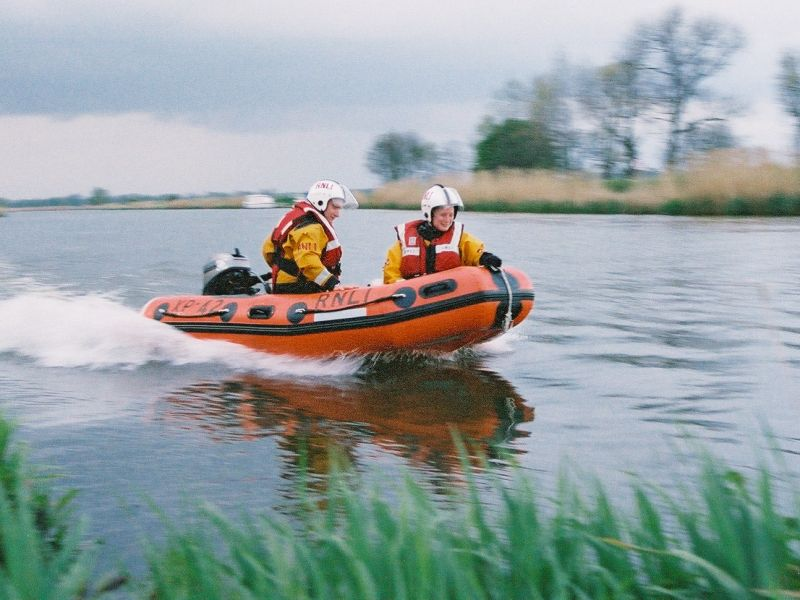
- XP-class lifeboat

Class overview
- Name: XP-class
- Builders: Avon Inflatables
- Operators: Royal National Lifeboat Institution

General characteristics
- Displacement: 70 kg (150 lb) without engine
- Length: 2.81 m (9.2 ft)
- Beam: 1.6 m (5.2 ft)
- Propulsion: Trent : 1 × 5 hp (3.7 kW) outboard engine; Broads: 1 × 10 hp (7.5 kW) Mariner engine
- Speed: Trent: 6 knots (6.9 mph; 11 km/h); Broads: 24 knots (28 mph; 44 km/h)
- Range: Trent: within sight of ALB
- Endurance: Broads: 2 hours at top speed
- Capacity: 4 (up to 460 kg or 1,000 lb) (Note: based on Avon Rover R280 RIB specifications)
- Complement: 1–2

The XP-class lifeboat is a class of small inflatable rescue boat operated by the RNLI of the United Kingdom and Ireland.

Other small boats operated by the RNLI include the Arancia-class beach rescue boats, the X-class and the Y-class lifeboats.

== History ==
The XP-class boat was a commercially available small inflatable boat, the Avon Rover 200, for use as a tender with larger vessels, and manufactured by Avon in based in Dafen, Carmarthenshire, Wales.

The craft was acquired by the RNLI, primarily for service as a daughter boat for the Trent-class All-weather lifeboats, to be used in areas inaccessible to the much larger Trent-class.

One XP-class (XP-32) was operated as a daughter boat for the Teignmouth Atlantic 85-class.

Over a period of 10 years, four XP-class boats were placed on service at South Broads Lifeboat Station in Suffolk. The XP was carried on a purpose built rack on the back of a Ford Ranger crew cab pickup, with the engine and all gear stowed in the load bed. On arrival on scene at any launch site within the 120-mile operating area of the station, the boat could be unpacked and launched within four minutes. On evaluation tests, it was found that with the engine tilted up, it could operate in water depths of just 2 in (51 mm). The South Broads boat had a 15-hp engine, delivering over 20 knots. South Broads closed in 2011.

== Specification ==
Operated by one or two crew members, the XP boat was usually equipped with a 5-hp outboard engine, giving a top speed of 6–8 knots. The boat weighed 70kg, and required inflation before use. It was constructed of hypalon/neoprene coated polyester, and featured a slatted roll-away deck.

All of the following fleet details are referenced to the 2004–2026 Lifeboat Enthusiast Society Handbooks, with information retrieved directly from RNLI records, although the majority of records were only kept from 2008 onwards.

== XP fleet list ==
Op. No. (Note: Op. No. is the RNLI's Operational Number of the boat carried on the hull.)	Host lifeboat	Station	In service	Comments
XP-01	14-31 Elizabeth of Glamis	Broughty Ferry	2004–2007	
XP-01	14-17 Elizabeth and Ronald	Dunmore East	2008–2017	
XP-01	14-17 Elizabeth and Ronald	Dunmore East	2020	
XP-01	14-27 Robert Hywel Jones Williams	Fenit	2022	
XP-02	14-16 Stanley Watson Barker	Portree	2008	
XP-02	14-25 Austin Lidbury	Ballycotton	2013	
XP-02	14-07 Frederick Storey Cockburn	Courtmacsherry Harbour	2016	
XP-02	14-32 Corinne Whiteley	Red Bay	2020–	
XP-03	14-08 Douglas Aikman Smith	Invergordon	2008–2009	
XP-04	14-31 Elizabeth of Glamis	Broughty Ferry	2008	
XP-04	14-31 Elizabeth of Glamis	Broughty Ferry	2010–2016	
XP-04	14-13 George and Ivy Swanson	Sheerness	2020	
XP-05	–	South Broads	2001–2004	
XP-05	14-04 Roy Barker I	Alderney	2010–2023	
XP-06	14-10 Samarbeta	Great Yarmouth and Gorleston	2008–2010	
XP-07	14-34 Elizabeth of Glamis	Broughty Ferry	2024–	
XP-09	14-34 Willie & May Gall	Fraserburgh	2008–2024	
XP-10	14-15 Henry Heys Duckworth	Red Bay	2016–2019	
XP-10	14-02 Esme Anderson	Ramsgate	2022	
XP-10	14-15 Henry Heys Duckworth	Port St Mary	2025–	
XP-11	14-15 Barclaycard Crusader	Eyemouth	2008–2017	
XP-13	14-05 Anna Livia	Dún Laoghaire	2004–2007	
XP-13	14-31 Elizabeth of Glamis	Broughty Ferry	2009	
XP-14	14-27 Robert Hywel Jones Williams	Fenit	2009–2021	
XP-14	14-27 Robert Hywel Jones Williams	Fenit	2023–	
XP-15	14-08 Douglas Aikman Smith	Invergordon	2010–2020	
XP-15	14-25 Austin Lidbury	Ballycotton	2022	
XP-16	14-26 Gough Ritchie II	Port St Mary	2008–2021	
XP-16	14-05 Anna Livia	Dún Laoghaire	2023–	
XP-17	14-37 Betty Huntbatch	Hartlepool	2009	
XP-17	14-31 Elizabeth of Glamis	Broughty Ferry	2017–2023	
XP-17	14-21 MacQuarie	Donaghadee	2023–2024	
XP-18	14-13 George and Ivy Swanson	Sheerness	2008–2019	
XP-19	14-04 Roy Barker I	Alderney	2008–2009	
XP-19	14-38 Jim Moffat	Troon	2011–2012	
XP-19	14-36 Saxon	Donaghadee	2016–2022	
XP-19	14-33 Roy Barker III	Howth	2023–	
XP-20	14-27 Robert Hywel Jones Williams	Fenit	2008	
XP-21	14-37 Betty Huntbatch	Hartlepool	2015	
XP-22	14-33 Roy Barker III	Howth	2010	
XP-23	14-18 Maurice and Joyce Hardy	Fowey	2009	
XP-23	14-28 Sam and Ada Moody	Achill Island	2011–2012	
XP-24*	14-30 Dr John McSparran	Larne	2009–2010	
XP-24*	14-30 Dr John McSparran	Larne	2013–2022	
XP-24*	14-03 Blue Peter VII	Fishguard	2020–	
XP-25	14-05 Anna Livia	Dún Laoghaire	2008–2009	
XP-25	14-05 Anna Livia	Dún Laoghaire	2011–2022	
XP-26	14-36 Saxon	Donaghadee	2009–2015	
XP-27	14-28 Sam and Ada Moody	Achill Island	2009–2010	
XP-27	14-28 Sam and Ada Moody	Achill Island	2013–	
XP-27	14-25 Austin Lidbury	Ballycotton	2012	
XP-28	14-02 Esme Anderson	Ramsgate	2009–2021	
XP-28	14-02 Esme Anderson	Eastbourne	2023–	
XP-29	14-20 Roy Barker II	Wick	2013–2022	
XP-30	14-36 Saxon	Donaghadee	2008	
XP-30	14-07 Frederick Storey Cockburn	Courtmacsherry Harbour	2009	
XP-30	14-05 Anna Livia	Dún Laoghaire	2010	
XP-30	14-26 Gough Ritchie II	Port St Mary	2022–2024	
XP-31	14-18 Maurice and Joyce Hardy	Fowey	2008	
XP-31	14-34 Willie & May Gall	Fraserburgh	2025–	
XP-32	B-809 The Two Annes	Teignmouth	2007–2013	
XP-32	14-18 Maurice and Joyce Hardy	Fowey	2021–2024	
XP-33	–	South Broads	2004–2005	
XP-33	14-20 Roy Barker II	Wick	2008–2012	
XP-34	14-19 Ger Tigchelaar	Arklow	2008–2024	
XP-34	14-19 Ger Tigchelaar	Holyhead	2026–	
XP-35	14-16 Stanley Watson Barker	Portree	2009–	
XP-36	14-23 Mora Edith MacDonald	Oban	2008–2022	
XP-36	14-21 MacQuarie	Donaghadee	2024–	
XP-37	14-38 Jim Moffat	Troon	2008	
XP-37	14-18 Maurice and Joyce Hardy	Fowey	2010–2012	
XP-38	14-30 Dr John McSparran	Larne	2008	
XP-38	14-10 Samarbeta	Great Yarmouth and Gorleston	2011–2021	
XP-38	14-10 Samarbeta	Great Yarmouth and Gorleston	2023–	
XP-39	14-35 John Neville Taylor	Dunbar	2008–2010	
XP-40	14-33 Roy Barker III	Howth	2008–2009	
XP-40	14-33 Roy Barker III	Howth	2011–2022	
XP-41	14-07 Frederick Storey Cockburn	Courtmacsherry Harbour	2008	
XP-41	14-07 Frederick Storey Cockburn	Courtmacsherry Harbour	2010–2011	
XP-41	14-07 Frederick Storey Cockburn	Courtmacsherry Harbour	2013–2015	
XP-41	14-07 Frederick Storey Cockburn	Courtmacsherry Harbour	2018–2022	
XP-41	14-07 Frederick Storey Cockburn	Holyhead	2025–2026	
XP-42	–	South Broads	2005–2008	
XP-43	14-38 Jim Moffat	Troon	2009–2010	
XP-43	14-38 Jim Moffat	Troon	2013	
XP-45	–	South Broads	2008–2011	
XP-45	14-18 Maurice and Joyce Hardy	Fowey	2013–2019	
XP-46	14-03 Blue Peter VII	Fishguard	2008–2019	
XP-46	14-18 Maurice and Joyce Hardy	Fowey	2020	
XP-46	13-41 William and Agnes Wray	Dunmore East	2023–2024	
XP-47	14-25 Austin Lidbury	Ballycotton	2008–2010	
XP-47	14-25 Austin Lidbury	Ballycotton	2014–2021	
XP-48	14-14 George and Mary Webb	Whitby	2008–2022	
XP-49	14-06 Windsor Runner (Civil Service No.42)	Dunmore East	2018–2019	
XP-49	14-10 Samarbeta	Great Yarmouth and Gorleston	2022	
XP-50	14-29 Inner Wheel II	Barry Dock	2009–2011	
XP-50	14-35 John Neville Taylor	Dunbar	2011–2012	
XP-50	14-29 Inner Wheel II	Barry Dock	2014–2023	
XP-50	14-29 Inner Wheel II	Alderney	2024–	
XP-51	14-37 Betty Huntbatch	Hartlepool	2016–2025	
XP-51	14-37 Betty Huntbatch	Douglas	2026–	

number* Unresolved date conflict
