= South Broads Lifeboat Station =

Former RNLI lifeboat station in Suffolk

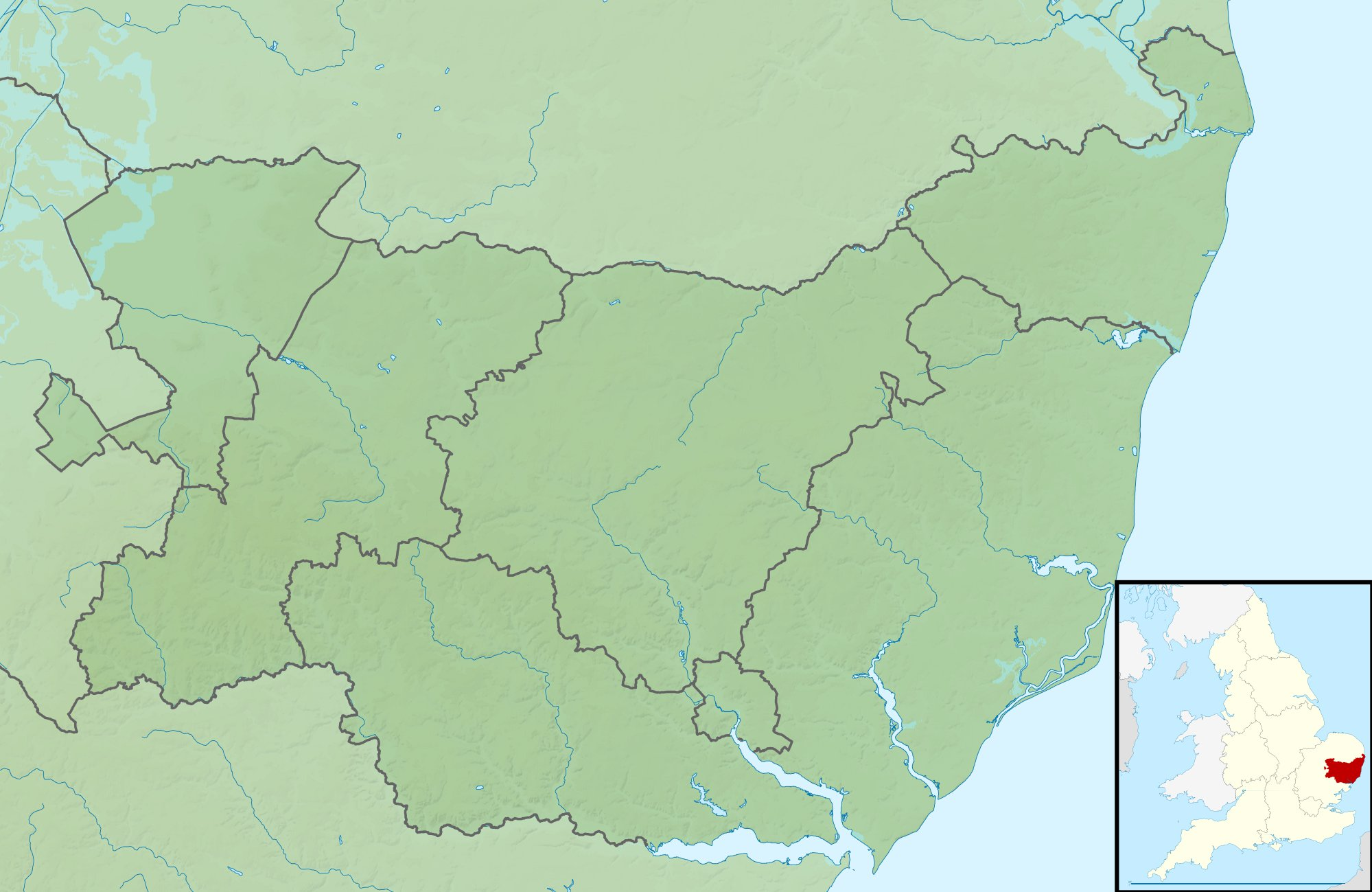
- Location within Suffolk

General information
- Status: Closed
- Type: RNLI Lifeboat Station
- Location: Lowestoft, Suffolk, England
- Coordinates: 52°28′38.37″N 1°42′32.90″E
- Opened: 2001
- Closed: November 2011
- Owner: Royal National Lifeboat Institution

South Broads Lifeboat Station was located at Oulton Broad, which refers to both the lake, the southernmost area of open water in the Broads system, and the suburb, to the east of the town of Lowestoft, in the English county of Suffolk.

A lifeboat station was established at Oulton Broad in 2001 by the Royal National Lifeboat Institution (RNLI).

After just 10 years of operation, South Broads Lifeboat station was closed.

== History ==
South Broads Lifeboat Station was established as part of a pilot project, to place lifeboats on Inshore waterways. The station covered the southern area of The Broads network, an area of over 100 square miles (260 km^{2}) of inland waterways including the River Waveney. Another station was established at the same time at Lough Erne.

The station primarily operated the D-class (EA16) Inshore lifeboat. The first one on station was named The Stanley Taylor (D-438), and had initially served at Tenby between 1993 and 2001. The lifeboat was the gift of Mrs Georgina Taylor, in memory of her late husband.

== Closure ==
The RNLI decided to close the station in January 2011 after a review, which recommended that lifesaving across The Broads would be more effectively covered from Great Yarmouth and Gorleston Lifeboat Station. Following the closure in November 2011, the station's D-class (IB1) Jean Ryall (D-714) and XP-class lifeboats were added to the RNLI relief fleet, and its 4x4 vehicle transferred to Great Yarmouth and Gorleston. In the 10 years of operation, the station performed 194 rescues.

== South Broads lifeboats ==
=== D-class ===
| Op. No. (Note: Op. No. is the RNLI's Operational Number of the boat carried on the hull.) | Name | On Station | Class | Comments |
|---|---|---|---|---|
| D-438 | The Stanley Taylor | 2001–2004 | D-class (EA16) | |
| D-449 | Humphry and Nora Tollemanche II | 2004–2005 | D-class (EA16) | |
| D-493 | Isabella Mary | 2005 | D-class (EA16) | |
| D-486 | Eleanor and Catherine | 2006–2007 | D-class (EA16) | |
| D-492 | Lawnflite | 2006–2007 | D-class (EA16) | |
| D-514 | Lord Kitchener | 2007–2010 | D-class (EA16) | |
| D-714 | Jean Ryall | 2010–2011 | D-class (IB1) | |

=== Arancia-class ===
| Op. No. | Name | On Station | Class | Comments |
|---|---|---|---|---|
| A-10 | Unnamed | 2003 | Arancia-class | Trials |

=== XP-class ===
| Op. No. | Name | On Station | Class | Comments |
|---|---|---|---|---|
| XP-5 | The Blob | 2001–2004 | XP-class | |
| XP-33 | The Blob Mk. 2 | 2004–2005 | XP-class | |
| XP-42 | Broads ILB2 | 2005–2008 | XP-class | |
| XP-45 | The Blob Mk. 3 | 2008–2011 | XP-class | |

== See also ==
- List of RNLI stations
- List of former RNLI stations
- Royal National Lifeboat Institution lifeboats
