= Wicklow Lifeboat Station =

RNLI lifeboat station in County Wicklow, Ireland

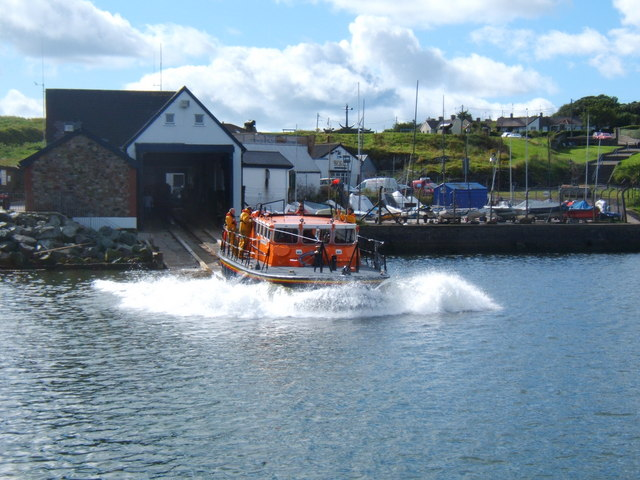
- Wicklow Lifeboat Station

- Location within Ireland

General information
- Type: RNLI Lifeboat Station
- Location: Lifeboat House, East Pier, Wicklow, County Wicklow, Ireland
- Coordinates: 52°58′54.0″N 6°01′57.8″W
- Opened: 1857
- Owner: Royal National Lifeboat Institution

Website
- Wicklow RNLI Lifeboat Station

Wicklow Lifeboat Station is located at East Pier in the county town of Wicklow, County Wicklow, a harbour town at the mouth of the River Vartry, on the east coast of Ireland.

A lifeboat was first placed at Wicklow by the Royal National Lifeboat Institution (RNLI) in 1857.

The station currently operates the Shannon-class All-weather lifeboat, 13-33 Bridie O'Shea (ON 1340), on station since 2024, and a D-class (IB1) Inshore lifeboat, Dennis-Audrey (D-806), on station since 2017.

== History ==
Even if there were no local lifeboats, the Royal National Institution for the Preservation of Life from Shipwreck (RNIPLS), later to become the RNLI in 1854, made awards for Gallantry. In 1831, coastguard officer Lt. Thomas Dymock Jones Dabine, RN, and his team of six, tied ropes around themselves, entering the surf to get a line to the schooner Jane, wrecked off Wicklow harbour, eventually rescuing four people after two hours of effort. In 1839, coastguard officer Owen Jones and a team of seven swam out to the wreck of the brig Le Nouveau Destin, ashore off Co. Wicklow, and saved six people. Each officer was awarded the RNIPLS Silver Medal.

In late 1854, the chairman of Wicklow Town Commissioners was tasked with the purchase of a lifeboat. A meeting was held with Capt. John Ward, RNLI Inspector of Lifeboats, in October 1856, and it was agreed that if the cost of a boathouse and an annual sum for maintenance could be raised locally, then the RNLI would provide a lifeboat and all necessary equipment. A boathouse was constructed near the Packet Pier, and a modified 30 ft (9.1 m) self-righting 'Pulling and Sailing' (P&S) lifeboat, one with oars and sails, named Dauntless, previously in service with The Shipwrecked Fishermen and Mariners' Royal Benevolent Society (SFMRBS) at Portmadoc, was transported to Dublin free of charge by the British and Irish Steam Packet Company, arriving in Wicklow in September 1857.

One of the worst storms for years occurred around 9 February 1861. Over 200 ships are listed as wrecked on that day, according to the List of shipwrecks in February 1861. Five vessels were driven ashore within 3 miles (4.8 km) of Wicklow harbour. The Wicklow lifeboat managed to save all eight men aboard the brig New Draper of Whitehaven, on passage to Dublin.

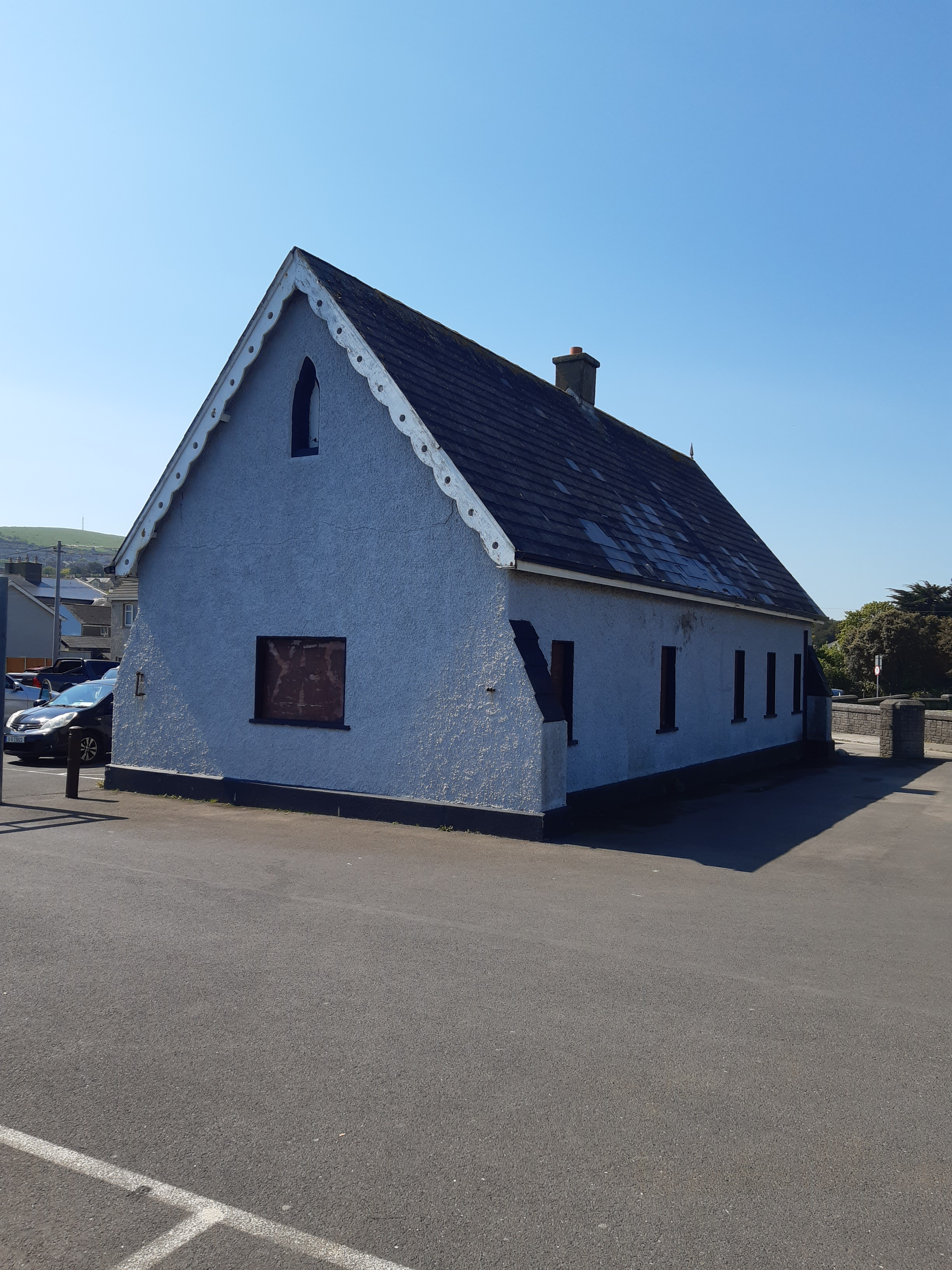
Former 1866 RNLI Lifeboat House at The Murrough, Wicklow

Mr Robert Jones Garden, of Montague Square, London, wrote to the RNLI in 1861, wishing to fund a lifeboat on the east coast of Ireland, in memory of his father. The location of the first boathouse at Wicklow seems to have not been a wise decision, as the land where it was located was suffering from coastal erosion, and in 1864, it had been noted that the sea would soon undermine the seven-year-old structure. It was agreed that his donation would go to the complete refurbishment of Wicklow lifeboat station, to include a replacement lifeboat, carriage, equipment and boathouse. A new location was found for a boathouse on The Murrough. On its completion in August 1866, the lifeboat, and carriage were dispatched to Wicklow, and at a ceremony on 7 September 1866, the new lifeboat was named Robert Theophilus Garden (ON 116).

On 31 August 1882, the steamship Lake Nepigon, on passage from Liverpool to Québec with 100 passengers and 54 crew, was driven onto Arklow Bank in a South-west gale, (now the site of Arklow Bank Wind Park). Unable to refloat the vessel, the captain ordered the six ship's lifeboats to be launched. The alarm was raised when No.3 lifeboat was found by a fishing vessel, and 29 survivors were landed at Wicklow. The Wicklow lifeboat was immediately launched, and fortunately located the other five ship's lifeboats, taking some survivors on board, and the boats in tow. From these, 55 people were taken by the North Arklow Lightship tender Emerald Isle. After considering the conditions, 52 people were landed at Greystones by the Wicklow lifeboat. The Arklow lifeboat was sent out to rescue the remaining 18 crew, searching for hours, but finding nothing. It turned out that the vessel had re-floated on the high tide, and was later seen passing Holyhead, returning to Liverpool.

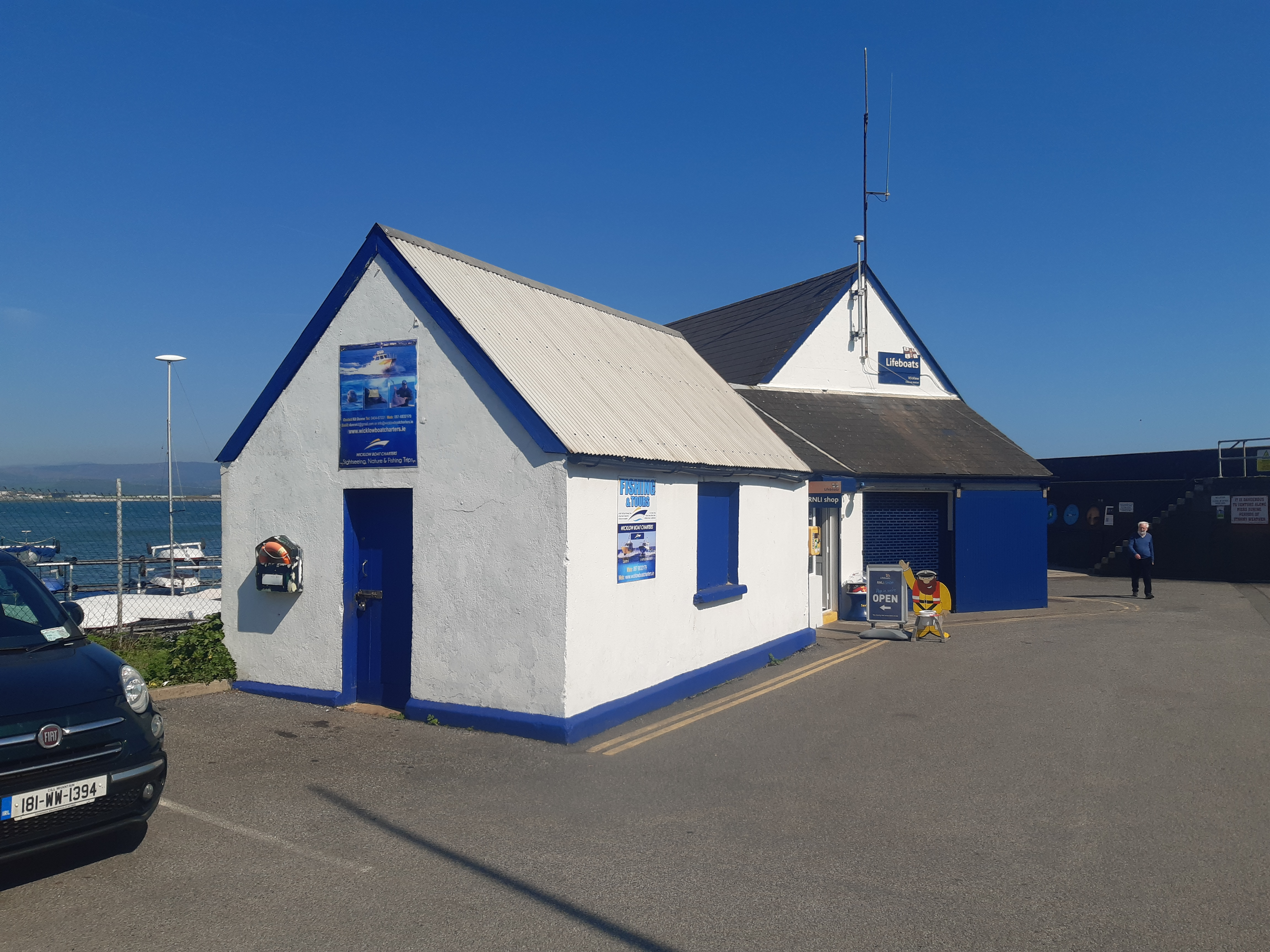
1886 Wicklow Lfeboat House

In 1886, it was decided to construct another new boathouse. Difficulties had been encountered launching over the shingle from the Murrough, so a boathouse was constructed on the East Pier with a slipway, costing £654. This boathouse is still the station building in use today, although it is not required to house the lifeboat, which is moored afloat. The 1866 boathouse also still stands, located just off Upper Strand street.

On her last service on 1 Nov 1887, Robert Theophilus Garden (ON 116) was launched to the schooner Samuel Dixon, and saved four lives. She would be replaced by a 40 ft (12 m) lifeboat, built for North Deal but found to be unsuitable for that location. It would appear that Mr Garden maintained regular donations to the RNLI for a considerable period, as this new boat would be renamed Robert Theophilus Garden (ON 178), as would be two later lifeboats.

In 1894, whilst the Coxswain was seeking the Honorary Secretary for launch instructions, the Master of a coaster and 15 men took possession of the lifeboat, launching to the aid of a fishing boat, rescuing the crew.

Wicklow would get its first motor lifeboat in 1911. Named Robert Theophilus Garden (ON 609), it would be the first motor-powered lifeboat in Ireland. The boathouse was modified to accommodate the boat, and 12 rollers were fitted to the slipway.

On 10 September 1950, in calm conditions, Wicklow lifeboat Lady Klysant (ON 721) was launched to the Cameo of Glasgow, aground on Arklow Bank, but help was refused. Attempts to refloat the vessel over the next two days failed. Finally, in rough seas in the early hours of 13 September, the help of the lifeboat was finally accepted, and with considerable skill, all 11 crew were rescued. Coxswain Edward Kavanagh was awarded the RNLI Bronze Medal.

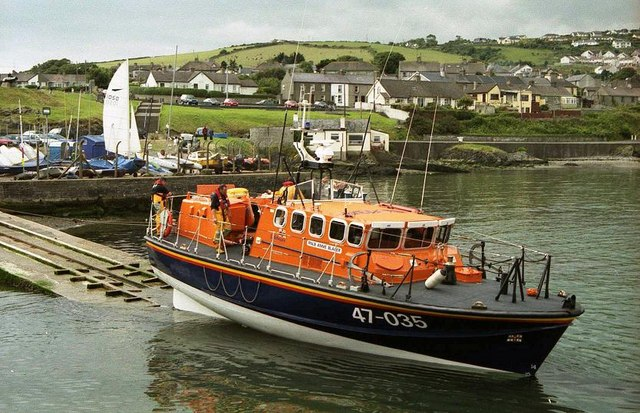
Wicklow Tyne-class lifeboat 47-035 Annie Blaker (ON 1153)

In 1989, the 1886 boathouse was modified, and the slipway extended, to accommodate a new Tyne-class lifeboat. 47-035 Annie Blaker (ON 1153) would serve Wicklow for 30 years, and during that time, was launched 340 times, and rescued over 400 people. The boat was the last Tyne-class lifeboat in service with the RNLI, and also the last steel-hulled lifeboat. Annie Blaker was sold to an enthusiast, and unusually, was still in full RNLI livery.

In 2019, following the retirement of Annie Blaker, Wicklow were assigned a Shannon-class lifeboat from the relief fleet. 13-01 Jock and Annie Slater (ON 1308) was placed on station until a permanent boat was assigned. Shannon-class lifeboat 13-27 Joanna and Henry Williams (ON 1334), previously in the relief fleet, served at Wicklow for four years, but in 2024, another Shannon-class lifeboat 13-33 Bridie O'Shea (ON 1340), also from the relief fleet, was placed on service permanently.

== Station honours ==
The following are awards made at Wicklow.

- RNIPLS Silver Medal
  Lt. Thomas Dymock Jones Dabine, RN, H.M. Coastguard Wicklow – 1831
  Owen Jones, Chief Officer, H.M. Coastguard Wicklow – 1839
- RNLI Bronze Medal
  Edward Kavanagh, Coxswain – 1950

== Wicklow lifeboats ==
=== Pulling and Sailing (P&S) lifeboats ===
ON (Note: ON is the RNLI's Official Number of the boat.)	Name	Built	On station	Class	Comments
Pre-249	Dauntless	1852	1857–1866	30-foot Beeching self-righting (P&S)	(Note: 30 ft 0 in (9.14 m) x 7 ft 6 in (2.29 m) (10-oared) Beeching-class self-righting (P&S) lifeboat, funded by The Shipwrecked Fishermen and Mariners' Royal Benevolent Society (SFMRBS), built by James Beeching of Great Yarmouth, costing £133 when new. Modified to Peake's design.); Previously at Portmadoc. Condemned in 1866.
116	Robert Theophilus Garden	1866	1866–1889	33-foot Peake self-righting (P&S)	(Note: 33 ft 0 in (10.06 m) x 8 ft 1 in (2.46 m) (10-oared) Peake-class self-righting (P&S) lifeboat, legacy of Mr R. T. Garden of London and County Clare, built by Forrestt of Limehouse, London, costing £275.); Sold in 1889.
178	Robert Theophilus Garden	1886	1889–1898	40-foot self-righting (P&S)	(Note: 40 ft 0 in (12.19 m) x 10 ft 0 in (3.05 m) (12-oared) self-righting (P&S) lifeboat, legacy of Mr R. T. Garden of London and County Clare, built by Forrestt of Limehouse, London, costing £700.); Previously Mary Somerville at North Deal. Broken up in 1898.
265	Reserve No. 3A	1883	1898–1899	37-foot self-righting (P&S)	(Note: 37 ft 0 in (11.28 m) x 9 ft 0 in (2.74 m) (12-oared) self-righting (P&S) lifeboat, funded by the Quiver Magazine LB Fund, built by Woolfe of Shadwell, London, costing £430.); Previously Quiver No.1 at Margate. Transferred to Watchet.
422	Robert Theophilus Garden	1898	1899–1911	40-foot self-righting (P&S)	(Note: 40 ft 0 in (12.19 m) x 10 ft 6 in (3.20 m) (12-oared) self-righting (P&S) lifeboat, legacy of Mr R. T. Garden of London and County Clare, built by Thames Ironworks, of Blackwall, London, costing £805.); Transferred to Rosslare Harbour.

Pre ON numbers are unofficial numbers used by the Lifeboat Enthusiasts' Society to reference early lifeboats not included on the official RNLI list.

=== Motor lifeboats ===
ON	Op.No. (Note: Op. No. is the RNLI's Operational Number of the boat carried on the hull.)	Name	Built	On station	Class	Comments
609	–	Robert Theophilus Garden	1910	1911–1937	40-foot self-righting (motor)	(Note: 40 ft 0 in (12.19 m) x 10 ft 6 in (3.20 m) self-righting (motor) lifeboat, with a single 40-hp 'Tylor' petrol engine, delivering 150 miles range at 7 knots (13 km/h; 8.1 mph), built by Thames Ironworks, of Blackwall, London, costing £4,015.); Sold in 1937. Renamed Sirius. Last reported in Copenhagen, Denmark, November 2024.
721	–	Lady Klysant	1929	1937–1956	40-foot 6in Watson	Previously at Weymouth and Howth.
933	–	J. W. Archer	1956	1956–1987	42-foot Watson	
931	–	Richard Vernon and Mary Garforth of Leeds	1956	1987–1988	46-foot 9in Watson	Previously at Angle.
1014	48-011	The Three Sisters	1970	1988–1989	Solent	Previously at Thurso.
1009	48-006	Jack Shayler and The Lees	1969	1989	Solent	Previously at Bembridge and Dunbar.
1153	47-035	Annie Blaker	1989	1989–2019	Tyne	
1308	13-01	Jock and Annie Slater	2012	2019–2020	Shannon	First deployed in the Relief fleet.
1334	13-27	Joanna and Henry Williams	2018	2020–2024	Shannon	First deployed in the Relief fleet.
1340	13-33	Bridie O'Shea	2019	2024–	Shannon	First deployed in the Relief fleet.

More post-service details can be found on the respective lifeboat class pages.

=== Inshore lifeboats ===
==== D class ====
Op.No.	Name	On station	Class	Comments
D-432	Ordnance Survey Bosun	1995–1997	D-class (EA16)	
D-518	Inbhear Deas	1997–2007	D-class (EA16)	
D-671	Sheringham Shanty Men	2007–2017	D-class (IB1)	
D-806	Dennis-Audrey	2017–	D-class (IB1)	

== See also ==
- List of RNLI stations
- List of former RNLI stations
- Royal National Lifeboat Institution lifeboats
