= Lytham Lifeboat Station =

RNLI Lifeboat station in Lancashire, England

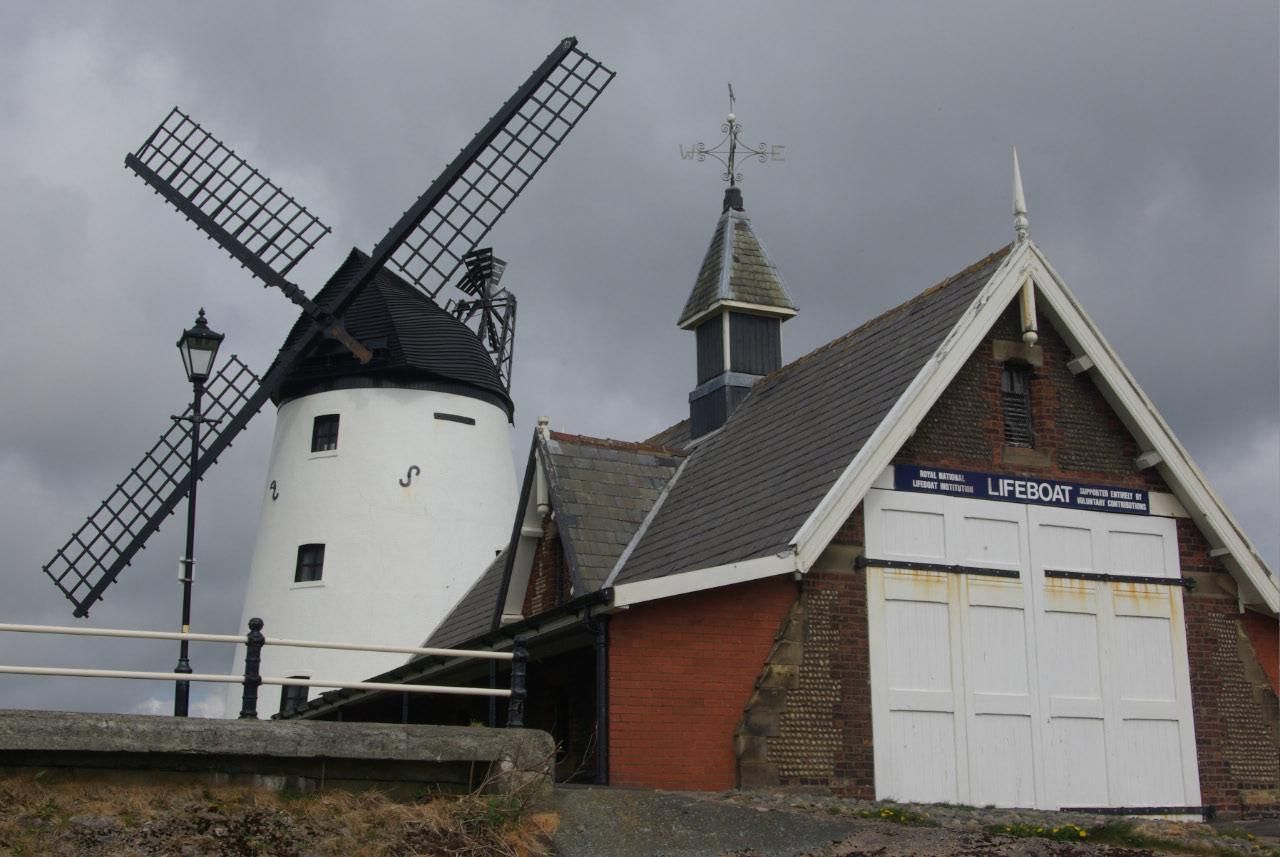
- 1863 Lifeboat House, Lytham

- Location within Lancashire

General information
- Status: Closed
- Type: RNLI Lifeboat Station
- Location: Lifeboat Museum, East Beach, Lytham St Annes, Lancashire, FY8 5LD, England
- Coordinates: 53°44′07.9″N 2°57′19.5″W
- Opened: E of windmill 1851; S of windmill 1863
- Closed: 1931 Merged with St Annes Branch
- Owner: Royal National Lifeboat Institution

Listed Building – Grade II
- Official name: Old lifeboat house
- Designated: 13 January 1971
- Reference no.: 1196369

Lytham Lifeboat Station is a former lifeboat station (by virtue of its merger), located in the Fylde coast town of Lytham, Lancashire.

A lifeboat was first stationed at Lytham by the Shipwrecked Fishermen and Mariners' Royal Benevolent Society (SFMRBS) in 1851. Management of the station was passed to the Royal National Lifeboat Institution (RNLI) on 7 December 1854.

In 1931, the Lytham station merged with the St Annes RNLI branch, becoming Lytham St Annes Lifeboat Station, which continues to this day.

== History ==
In 1851, Mr John Hayes of Lytham wrote to the Royal National Institute for the Preservation of Life from Shipwreck (RNIPLS), requesting that a lifeboat be placed at Lytham. The Institution had been going through lean times, especially since the loss of its driving force and founder, Sir William Hillary, Bt, in 1847, and requested that local funding make up half the cost of the boat. Having raised £200, the SFMRBS then stepped forward, and offered to fund a boat for the amount already raised. Concerned at the decline of the RNIPLS, they were wanting to start their own lifeboat stations.

An agreement was made, and a 28-foot 8-oar lifeboat was constructed by James Beeching, using a design which had won the prize of £100 for a self-righting lifeboat, in a competition set by the Duke of Northumberland, now the president of the RNIPLS. Land and a boathouse were provided by local landowner John Talbot Clifton of Lytham Hall. The lifeboat arrived in December 1851, and was named The Clifton.

Less than a year later, disaster struck Lytham Lifeboat. It capsized on exercise on 1 October 1852, and eight men were lost; the lifeboat didn't self-right. Afterwards it was discovered that doors had been cut into the airtight boxes for storage, and that the water ballast tanks had not been plugged, allowing the water to escape, thus cancelling any self-righting capability. None of the crew were wearing lifejackets. In a twist of fate, the two survivors, James Parkinson and Richard Gillett, were drowned in a separate incident on 18 October 1863.

In 1854, under the guidance of the Duke of Northumberland, the RNIPLS was in a better financial position. On 5 October 1854, the RNIPLS became the Royal National Lifeboat Institution.

On 7 December 1854, an agreement was made between the SFMRBS and the RNLI, whereby the former would concentrate on the welfare of those people rescued, while the latter would be involved in lifeboats, stations and rescues. Management of all eight stations of the SFMRBS, Hornsea, Rhyl, Portmadoc, Tenby, Llanelli, Teignmouth, Newhaven and Lytham, was transferred to the RNLI.

A 30-foot Peake-class lifeboat built by Forrestt of Limehouse arrived at Lytham on 12 August 1855. She was named Eleanor Cecily, after Mrs Clifton of Lytham Hall. In terrible conditions on 20 October 1862, the Lytham boat rescued 14 from the full-rigged ship Ann E. Hooper of Baltimore, (Note: Ann is also reported as Anne and Annie.) ashore on Horse Bank, with another four being rescued by the Southport lifeboat. Lytham coastguard George Read was aboard the Eleanor Cecily; he was later awarded the Presidential Gold Medal. Monetary awards were sent by president Abraham Lincoln. 13 were rescued from the Brazil of Liverpool, on passage from Bangor, Maine, which went ashore on Salthouse Bank on 26 December 1862.

Eleanor Cecily was replaced in 1863 with the Wakefield, a 33-foot 10-oared self-righting lifeboat, costing £263 4s 4d (£263.22), provided by Mr Thomas Clayton, and named after his home town. A new lifeboat house was constructed next to Lytham Windmill at a cost of £160 2s 0d (£160.10), the old boathouse being demolished soon afterwards.

In those days, donors were expected to make recurring payments, and, if not forthcoming, the boat may be assigned funds from other donors, and renamed accordingly. In 1878, the Wakefield was renamed Charles Biggs, the legacy of Miss L. M. Biggs of London, after her late brother. In its 23-year service, the boat launched 49 times, and rescued 85.

James Candlish, Coxswain since 1854, was awarded the RNLI Silver Medal in 1864 for two services to the St Lawrence, and for his previous service.

On 9 December 1886, the German barque Mexico was driven ashore at Trunk Hill Brow, Ainsdale. Much has been documented about the Mexico disaster. All 13 crewmen aboard the Laura Janet lifeboat of St Annes, and 14 of 16 crew of the Southport lifeboat Eliza Fernley, were lost, the greatest ever disaster for the RNLI. As it turned out, the Southport and St Annes boats need not have launched, as all 12 aboard the Mexico were saved by the Lytham boat. For the efforts that day, Coxswain Thomas Clarkson was awarded the RNLI Silver Medal. The station also received an award.

On service to the vessel Douglas of Preston, Lancashire, on 15 December 1911, an enormous wave lifted the Charles Biggs (ON 73), and deposited her down onto Salter's Bank. Impossible to refloat the boat, the crew had to leave it where it was, and walk home. The boat, being undamaged, was retrieved two days later. Charles Biggs remained in service at Lytham until 1912. The replacement was a 35-foot self-righting lifeboat Kate Walker (ON 627), named after the late wife of the donor John Charles Walker. She served Lytham until 1931, launching just four times, but rescuing 8 lives.

On 12 March 1931, the Lytham RNLI branch merged with the St Annes RNLI branch, and, on 7 April 1931, Lytham St Annes received the replacement motor-powered lifeboat J. H. W. (ON 738). The boathouse at Lytham would no longer house the lifeboat, due to its size and weight, although it remained in use as storage for equipment and boarding boats until 1960. Kate Walker was transferred in 1931 to Porthoustock, where she served for another 11 years.

For more information about St Annes or Lytham St Annes lifeboat stations, see:

- St Annes Lifeboat Station 1881–1925
- Lytham St Annes Lifeboat Station 1931–present

== Station honours ==
The following are awards made at Lytham:

- United States Presidential Lifesaving Gold Medal

George Read, H.M. Coastguard – 1880 (for service in 1862)

- RNLI Silver Medal

James Candlish, Coxswain – 1864
Thomas Clarkson, Coxswain – 1886

- Silver Medal
  awarded by the Société des Sauveteurs Médaillés du Gouvernement de la Gironde (Note: The acute accent of the second é of Médaillés changes the meaning from Medals to Medallists.)
  (Society of Medal-Winning Lifesavers of the Government of Gironde, France)
  for courage and devotion to duty

Lytham Lifeboat Station – 1886

== Roll of honour ==
In memory of those lost while serving Lytham lifeboat:

- On exercise in Lytham Lifeboat The Clifton, 1 October 1852

William Swann, Coxswain
John Davies, Second Coxswain
George Cookson
John Gillett
Thomas Gillett
Thomas Hardman
John Whiteside
James Winders

== Lytham lifeboats ==
=== Pulling and Sailing (P&S) lifeboats ===
ON (Note: ON is the RNLI's Official Number of the boat.)	Name	Built	On station	Class	Comments
Pre-239	The Clifton	1851	1851–1855	28-foot 3in Beeching Self-righting (P&S)	(Note: 28-foot 3in x 7-foot (8-oared) Beeching-class self-righting (P&S) lifeboat, built by James Beeching of Great Yarmouth, costing £124.); Capsized in 1852
Pre-294	Eleanor Cecily	1855	1855–1863	30-foot Peake Self-righting (P&S)	(Note: 30-foot x 7-foot 6in (10-oared) self-righting (P&S) lifeboat, from RNLI funds, built by Forrestt of Limehouse, London, costing £156.)
Pre-403	Wakefield	1863	1863–1878	33-foot Peake Self-righting (P&S)	(Note: 33-foot x 8-foot (10-oared) Peake-class self-righting (P&S) lifeboat, legacy of Mr T. Clayton of Wakefield, built by Forrestt of Limehouse, London, costing £263.); Renamed Charles Biggs in 1878
Pre-403	Charles Biggs	1863	1878–1886	33-foot Peake Self-righting (P&S)	(Note: Legacy of Miss L. M. Biggs of St John's Wood in 1876.)
73	Charles Biggs	1886	1886–1912	37-foot Self-righting (P&S)	(Note: 37-foot x 8-foot (12-oared) self-righting (P&S) lifeboat, legacy of Miss L. M. Biggs of St John's Wood, built by Forrestt of Limehouse, London, costing £370.)
627	Kate Walker	1911	1912–1931	35-foot Self-righting (P&S)	(Note: 35-foot x 8-foot 6in (10-oared) self-righting (P&S) lifeboat, legacy of Mr J. C. Walker of Ingleton, built by Thames Ironworks of Blackwall, London, costing £920.)

Pre ON numbers are unofficial numbers used by the Lifeboat Enthusiasts' Society to reference early lifeboats not included on the official RNLI list.

== See also ==
- List of RNLI stations
- List of former RNLI stations
- Royal National Lifeboat Institution lifeboats
