= Arancia-class lifeboat =

Class of inflatable rescue boat

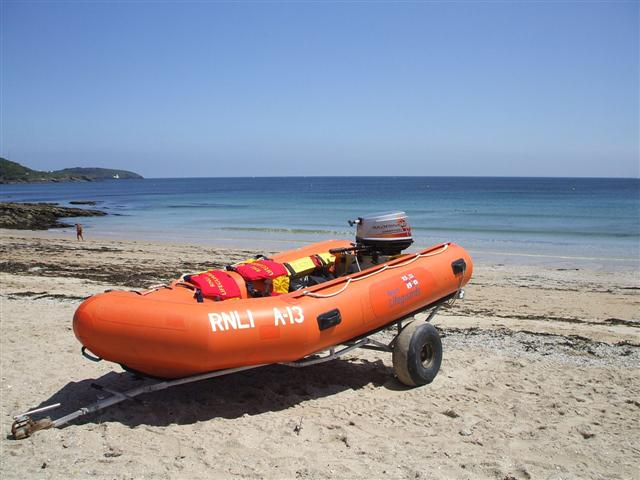
- Arancia inshore rescue boat at Gyllyngvase beach

Class overview
- Name: Arancia-class Inshore Rescue Boat
- Builders: Arancia Industries, New Zealand
- Operators: Royal National Lifeboat Institution
- In service: 2003–present

General characteristics
- Displacement: 165 kg (364 lb) without engine
- Length: 3.88 m (12.7 ft)
- Beam: 1.73 m (5.7 ft)
- Propulsion: 1 × 30 hp (22 kW) Mariner outboard engine
- Speed: 26 knots (30 mph; 48 km/h)
- Capacity: 8
- Complement: 2

The Arancia-class inshore rescue craft is a class of small inflatable rescue boat (IRB) operated by, among others, Surf Lifesaving Great Britain, Surf Life Saving Association of Wales and the Royal National Lifeboat Institution (RNLI) of the United Kingdom and Ireland.

The Arancia inshore rescue craft originates from New Zealand where it is made by Arancia Industries Ltd. The Arancia surf rescue craft is also used in Surf Rescue competitions to demonstrate the high speed rescue skills of boat crews around the world. When in use it carries up to two crew and is primarily used for surf lifesaving duties.

Other small boats operated by the RNLI include the X-class lifeboat, XP-class lifeboat and Y-class lifeboat. The RNLI have placed the Arancia at some lifeboat stations to supplement the Atlantic 85.

Two stations in Wales, Aberystwyth and Criccieth, now have these as permanent resources after a trial period.

All of the following fleet details are referenced to the Lifeboat Enthusiasts' Society Handbook, published annually, with information retrieved directly from RNLI records.

== Arancia fleet ==
Op. No. (Note: Op. No. is the RNLI's operational number of the boat)	Name	In service	Station	Comments
A-10	Unnamed	2003	South Broads (Trials)	
A-10	Unnamed	2010–2011	Boarding boat (The Lizard)	
A-10	Unnamed	2012–2014	Boarding boat (Porthdinllaen)	
A-17	Unnamed	2013–2016	Boarding boat (St Davids)	
A-31	Unnamed	2016–2020	Plymouth	
A-31	Unnamed	2021	Fowey	
A-48	Margaret and Bruce	2011–2012	Great Yarmouth and Gorleston	
A-67	Malcolm Hawkesford I	2013–2025	Teignmouth	
A-67	Malcolm Hawkesford I	2025–	Publicity	
A-68	Malcolm Hawkesford II	2013–2017	Boarding boat (Fowey)	
A-68	Malcolm Hawkesford II	2017–	Relief fleet	
A-70	Unnamed	2009–2010	Criccieth	
A-73	Unnamed	2010–2011	Criccieth	
A-73	Unnamed	2011–2012	Aberystwyth	
A-73	Unnamed	2013–2015	Boarding boat (Moelfre)	
A-73	Unnamed	2015–	Relief fleet	
A-76	Margaret and Nantw	2011–	Criccieth	
A-77	Kingfisher	2012–2020	Great Yarmouth and Gorleston	
A-77	Kingfisher	2020–	Relief fleet	
A-78	Wren	2012–	Aberystwyth	
