= Aberystwyth Lifeboat Station =

RNLI lifeboat station in Ceredigion, Wales

- Gorsaf Bad Achub Aberystwyth

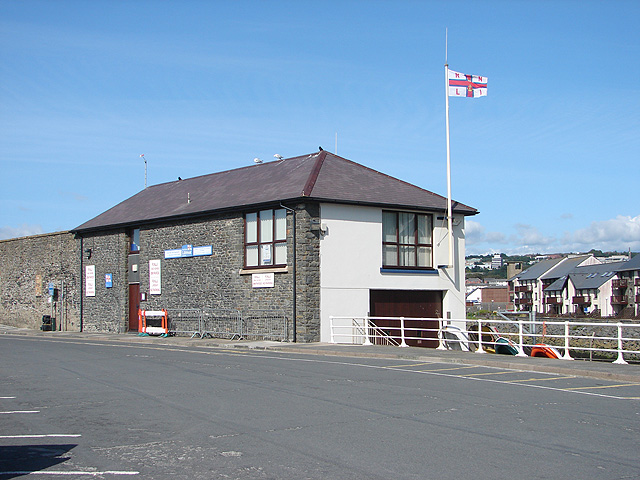
- Aberystwyth Lifeboat Station at South Marine Terrace

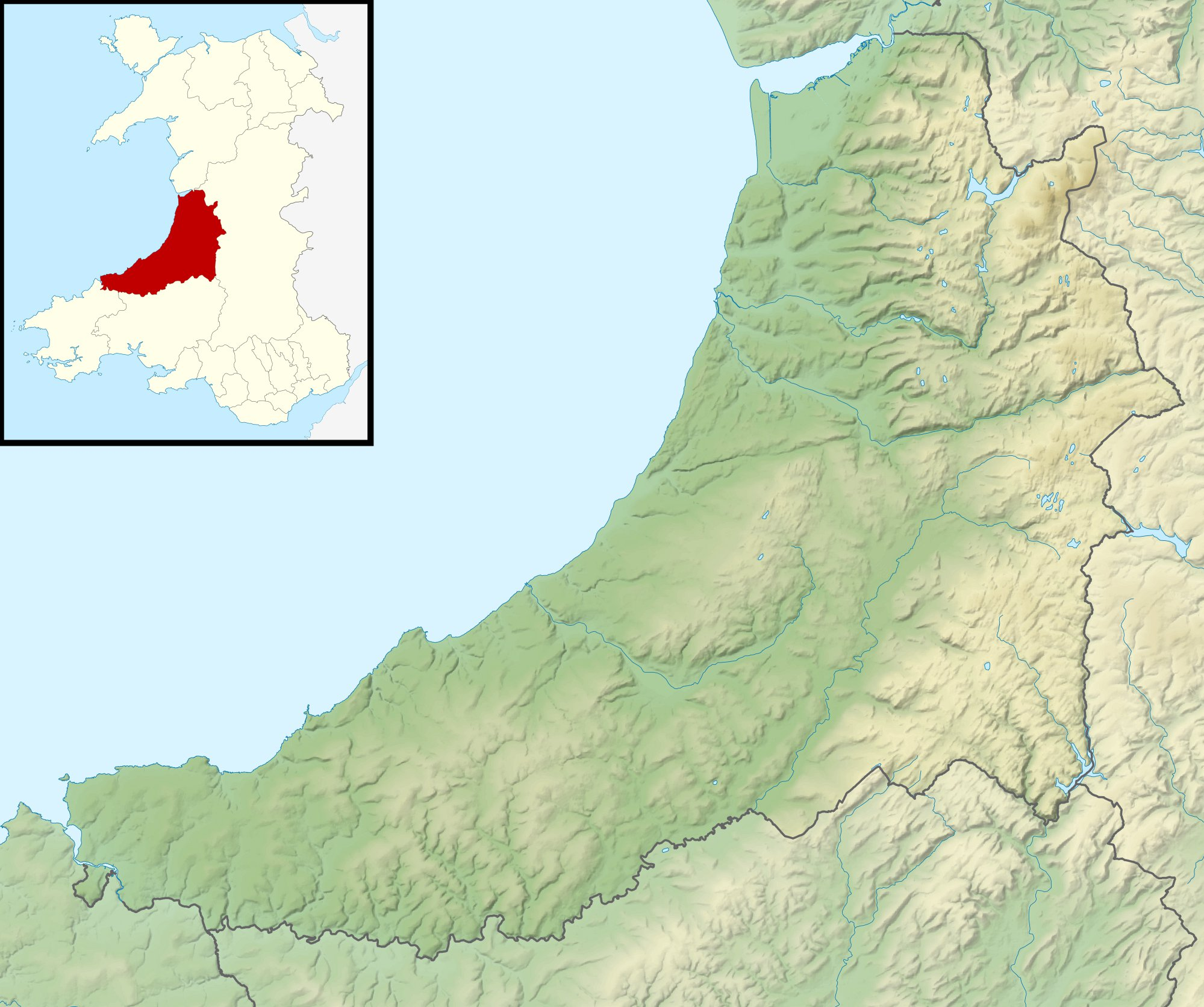
- Location within Ceredigion

General information
- Type: RNLI Lifeboat Station
- Location: Town Quay, South Marine Terrace, Aberystwyth, Ceredigion, Wales, SY23 1JY, UK
- Coordinates: 52°24′32″N 4°05′20″W
- Opened: 1843 Harbour Trust; 1862 RNLI
- Owner: Royal National Lifeboat Institution

Website
- Aberystwyth RNLI Lifeboat Station

Aberystwyth Lifeboat Station (Welsh: Gorsaf Bad Achub Aberystwyth) is located at South Marine Terrace, in the coastal resort of Aberystwyth, Ceredigion, which sits on Cardigan Bay, on the west coast of Wales.

A lifeboat was first placed at Aberystwyth in 1843. Management of the station was taken over by the Royal National Lifeboat Institution (RNLI) in 1862.

In 2023, the station received a new B-class (Atlantic 85) Inshore lifeboat, RNLB Florence and Ernest Bowles (B-937), which is launched by submersible tractor. The station also has a smaller Arancia-class Inshore lifeboat, Wren (A-78).

== History ==
The first lifeboat at Aberystwyth was a 26-foot, 6-oared Palmer-class lifeboat, funded by the Aberystwyth Harbour Trust, and under the control of the harbour master. No records of any service carried out have been found. The boat was condemned in 1861.

It is said that there were calls for a lifeboat service at Aberystwyth, after the wreck of the Aquila on 19 February 1861, whilst on passage from Llanelli to Aberdovey.

In 1862, the RNLI took over the station, completing a chain of RNLI stations along the coast of Cardigan Bay from Strumble Head to the Llŷn Peninsula. A new 32-foot 10-oared self-righting 'pulling and sailing' (P&S) lifeboat, one with oars and sails, was placed at the station, and named Evelyn Wood.

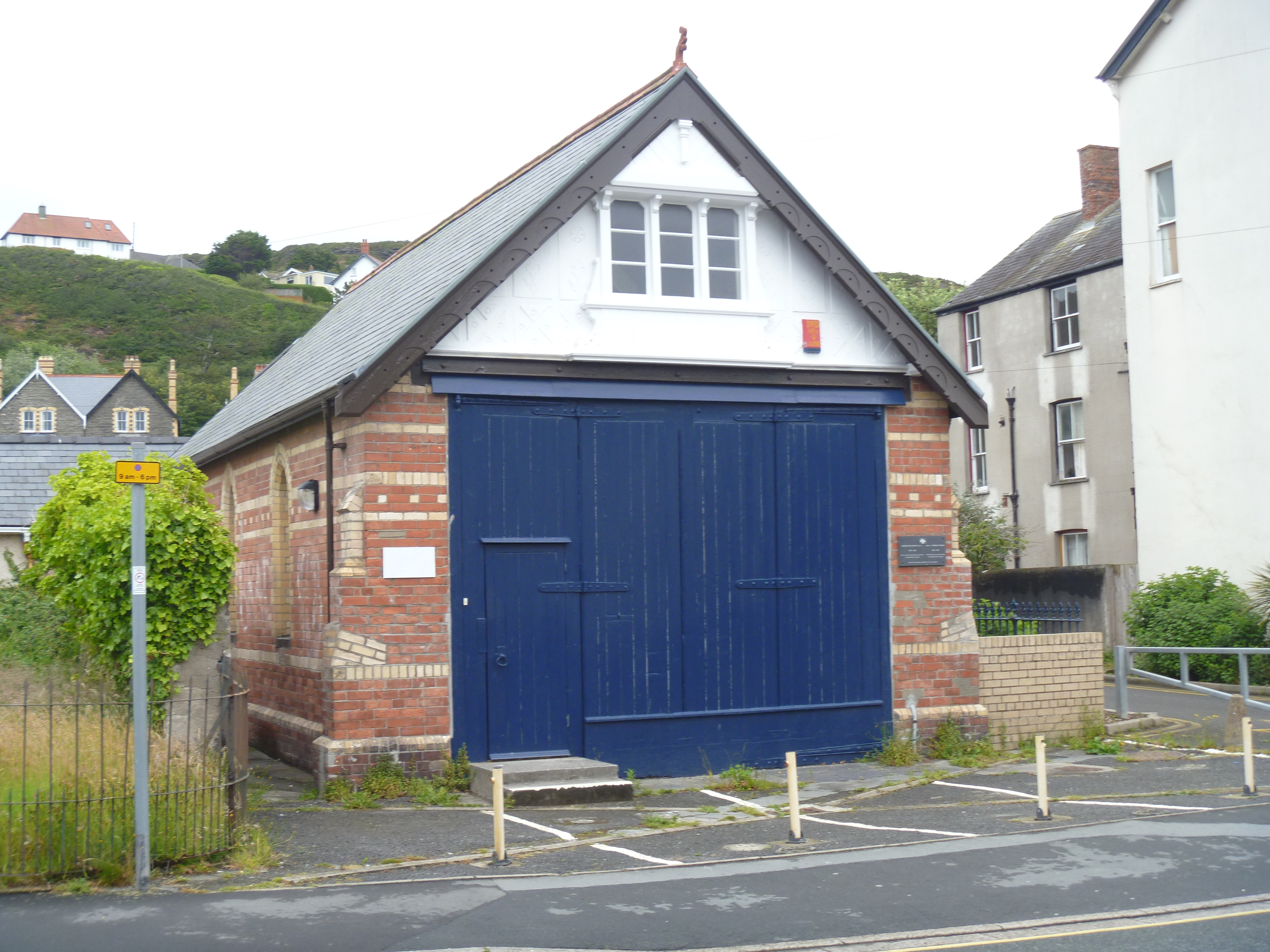
1875 Lifeboat House on Queen's Road

The first lifeboat house was built on Victoria terrace, near to the Glengower Hotel today. It cost £125-5s-6d. In 1875, a new boathouse was constructed on Queens Road, at a cost of £250. This was later used as a BBC studio between 1990 and 2000, and then a store for Ceredigion County Council. Since 2020, it has been used by Ceredigion Archives, with regulated temperature and humidity, following a grant from the Welsh Government.

On 20 February 1877, crew member John James succumbed to cold and exhaustion, after enduring a six-hour service to rescue three men from the schooner Sarah Ellen of Liverpool. The station now awards the John James Award for Outstanding Commitment annually to crew members.

A severe gale on 29 December 1900 saw Coxswain David Williams launch the lifeboat to a fishing smack; in heavy seas three lifeboatmen (Jack Williams, Tom Jones and J.C. Rea) were thrown overboard but were rescued by their fellow crewmen. Despite the loss of most of their oars, they managed to beach the lifeboat and hold it until the tide ebbed. In the meantime the fishermen, whose boat was wrecked on the rocks, made it safely to shore.

In February 1946 Frederick Angus (ON 757) was at sea for more than 24 hours in severe weather standing by the broken-down submarine HMS Universal and helping to rescue her crew.

In 1964, the Liverpool-class lifeboat Aguila Wren (ON 892) was withdrawn, and Aberystwyth became the first RNLI lifeboat station to change from offshore to solely inshore lifeboats.

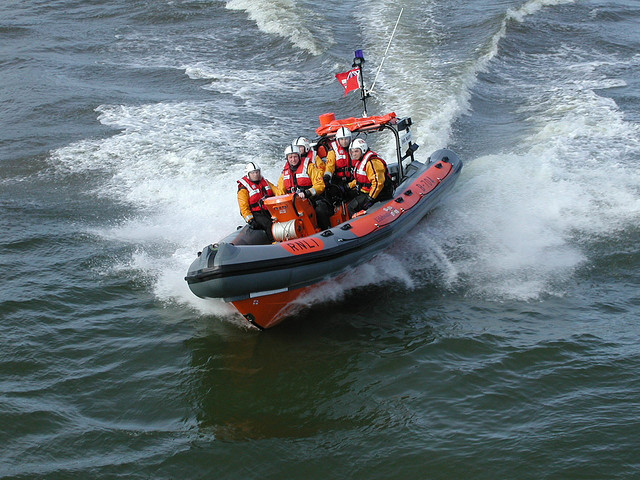
Aberystwyth's Atlantic 75-class RNLB Enid Mary (B-704)

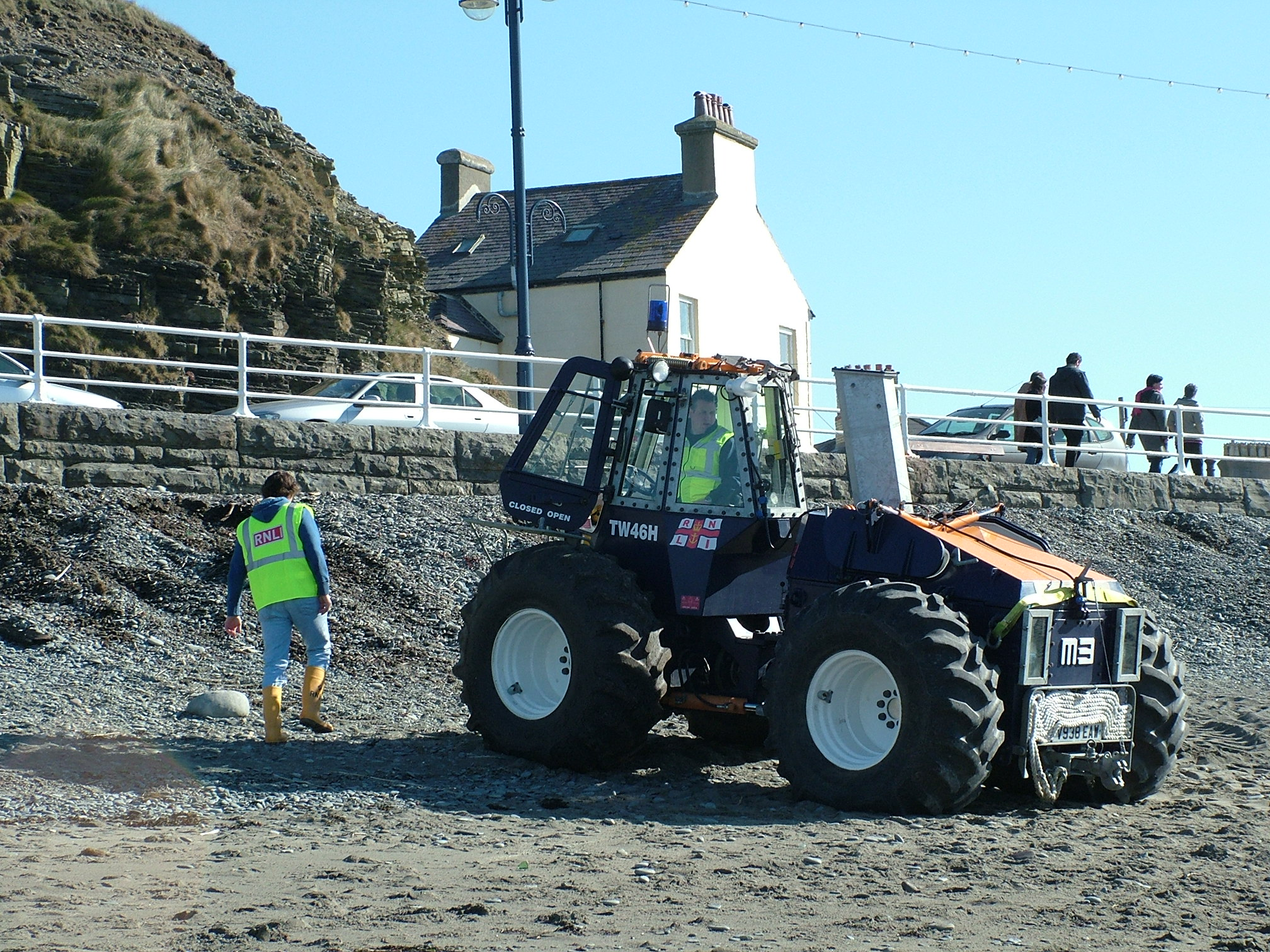
Talus MB-4H Launching Tractor

The Arancia IRB was placed at Aberystwyth in 2011 and was dedicated in Holy Trinity Church, believed to be the first and only lifeboat to be dedicated within a church.

== Visitor access ==
This station is classed as an RNLI "Observe" lifeboat station; it welcomes visitors via appointment. Groups (schools, clubs, organisations) who wish to visit the station can request a tour and presentation via the stations website.

== Station honours ==
The following are awards made at Aberystwyth:

- RNLI Silver Medal

For swimming out to the schooner Rebecca of Bridgwater, to effect the rescue of six people, 25 March 1866, and for swimming out in rough seas to save the life of his father, 10 September 1866
Watkin Lewis – 1866

- RNLI Bronze Medal

For the rescue of the trapped crew of capsized motor cruiser Annabel II, 22 February 1976
Alan Blair, crew member – 1976

For the rescue of one man and saving the yacht Otter, 18 September 1990
Peter Heading, Helm – 1991
Robert James Gorman, skipper, fishing vessel Seren-y-mor – 1991

- 'The Thanks of the Institution inscribed on Vellum'

For the rescue of crew from fishing vessel Lindy Lou, 26 July 1954
Baden P. Davies, Coxswain – 1954

For the rescue of a bather, 1 September 1970
Alan Blair – 1970
Mike Nichol – 1970
Keith Stone – 1970

For courage and seamanship, attending motor cruiser Annabel II, 22 February 1976
Tony Meyler, skipper of the Western Seas – 1976

For the rescue of one man and saving the yacht Otter, 18 September 1990
Michael Harris, crew member – 1991

- The Ralph Glister Award, for the most outstanding ILB service during 1990
  jointly awarded to the crew of the ILB and the crew of the Seren-Y-Mor..

For the rescue of one man and saving the yacht Otter, 18 September 1990
Peter Heading, Helm – 1991
Michael Harris, crew member – 1991
David Davies, crew member – 1991
Martin Porter, crew member – 1991

Robert James Gorman, skipper, fishing vessel Seren-y-mor – 1991
Alan Blair, crew of the Seren-Y-Mor – 1991
Brian Slack, crew of the Seren-Y-Mor – 1991
Bryan Pugh-Jones, crew of the Seren-Y-Mor – 1991
Sandro James, crew of the Seren-Y-Mor – 1991

- 'A Framed Letter of Thanks signed by the Chairman of the Institution'

A member of the lifeboat crew, who put out into a south-east gale in his fishing vessel Lona, taking in tow two boats, rescuing four people, 6 December 1978.
Robert James Gorman – 1978

For the rescue of one man and saving the yacht Otter, 18 September 1990
David Davies, crew member – 1991
Martin Porter, crew member – 1991
Alan Blair, crew of the Seren-Y-Mor – 1991
Brian Slack, crew of the Seren-Y-Mor – 1991
Bryan Pugh-Jones, crew of the Seren-Y-Mor – 1991
Sandro James, crew of the Seren-Y-Mor – 1991

- 'A Letter of Thanks signed by the Chairman of the Institution'

For swimming out and rescuing a young girl, 3 July 1985
Alan Blair – 1985

== Roll of honour ==
In memory of those lost at Aberystwyth:

- Died from cold and exhaustion, after a long service to the Irish schooner Sarah Ellen on 20 February 1877.

John James, crew member

== Aberystwyth lifeboats ==
Aberystwyth has been served by a number of lifeboats in its more than 150 years of operation by the RNLI and more than 170 years in total.

=== Aberystwyth Harbour Trust lifeboat ===
Name	Built	On station	Class	Comments
Unnamed	1843	1843–1861	26-foot Palmer	(Note: 26 ft 0 in (7.92 m) x 6 ft 3 in (1.91 m) (6-oared) Palmer-class non-self-righting lifeboat, funded by the Aberystwyth Harbour Trust, built by Taylor of Blackwall, London, costing £75.); Condemned in 1861.

=== Pulling and Sailing (P&S) lifeboats ===
ON (Note: ON is the RNLI's Official Number of the boat.)	Name	Built	On station	Class	Comments
Pre-384	Evelyn Wood	1861	1862–1876	32-foot Peake self-righting (P&S)	(Note: 32 ft 0 in (9.75 m) x 8 ft 2 in (2.49 m) (10-oared) Peake-class self-righting (P&S) lifeboat, gift of Mrs B. Wood of Eltham, built by Forrestt of Limehouse, London, costing £189.); Unfit for service, 1876.
Pre-573	Lady Haberfield	1873	1876–1881	33-foot Peake self-righting (P&S)	(Note: 33 ft 0 in (10.06 m) x 8 ft 2 in (2.49 m) (10-oared) Peake-class self-righting (P&S) lifeboat, funded by the Ind. Order of Good Templars, later from the legacy of Lady Haberfield of Clifton, Bristol, built by Forrestt of Limehouse, London, costing £278 when new.); Previously Good Templar at Sunderland. Condemned in 1881.
Pre-653	Lady Haberfield	1880	1881–1887	35-foot self-righting (P&S)	(Note: 35 ft 0 in (10.67 m) x 9 ft 0 in (2.74 m) (10-oared) self-righting (P&S) lifeboat, legacy of Lady Haberfield of Clifton, Bristol, built by Woolfe of Shadwell, London, costing £397.); Sold in 1887.
128	Elizabeth Lloyd	1887	1887–1905	34-foot self-righting (P&S)	(Note: 34 ft 0 in (10.36 m) x 8 ft 0 in (2.44 m) (10-oared) self-righting (P&S) lifeboat, legacy of Mr T. E. Jones of Wilmslow, built by Forrestt of Limehouse, London, costing £480.); Broken up in 1905.
370	Reserve No. 5	1894	1905–1906	34-foot self-righting (P&S)	(Note: 34 ft 0 in (10.36 m) x 8 ft 0 in (2.44 m) (10-oared) self-righting (P&S) lifeboat, gift of Mr S. Bird of East Cowes, built by Forrest of Limehouse, London, costing £370.); Previously Lily Bird at Dunwich. Returned to the relief fleet, later at St Helier.
562	John and Naomi Beattie	1906	1906–1932	35-foot self-righting (P&S)	(Note: 35 ft 0 in (10.67 m) x 8 ft 6 in (2.59 m) (10-oared) self-righting (P&S) lifeboat, gift of Mrs C. F. Greenhill of London, built by Thames Ironworks of Blackwall, London, costing £823.); Sold in 1933. Renamed Chiquita. Now stored as John and Naomi Beattie for future display at Swansea Museum, December 2024

Pre ON numbers are unofficial numbers used by the Lifeboat Enthusiasts' Society to reference early lifeboats not included on the official RNLI list.

=== Motor lifeboats ===
ON	Name	Built	On station	Class	Comments
757	Frederick Angus	1932	1932–1949	35ft 6in Self-righting motor	
745	Lady Harrison	1931	1949–1951	35ft 6in Self-righting motor	Previously at Ramsey
892	Aguila Wren	1951	1951–1964	Liverpool	

All Weather Lifeboat withdrawn in 1964

=== Inshore lifeboats (ILBs) ===
Op.No. (Note: Op. No. is the RNLI's Operational Number of the boat carried on the hull.)	Name	On station	Class	Comments
D-1	Unnamed	1963	D-class (RFD PB16)	
D-19	Unnamed	1964	D-class (RFD PB16)	
D-30	Unnamed	1965–1967	D-class (RFD PB16)	
D-140	Unnamed	1967–1969	D-class (RFD PB16)	
D-28	Unnamed	1969–1970	D-class (RFD PB16)	
D-186	Unnamed	1970–1983	D-class (RFD PB16)	
C-509	Oats	1983–1993	C-class (Zodiac Grand Raid IV)	Formerly D-509 until reclassified
B-590	Wolverson X-Ray	1993–1994	B-class (Atlantic 21)	
B-704	Enid Mary	1994–2007	B-class (Atlantic 75)	
B-822	Spirit of Friendship	2007–2023	B-class (Atlantic 85)	
A-73	Unnamed	2011–2012	Arancia	
A-78	Wren	2012–	Arancia	
B-937	Florence and Ernest Bowles	2023–	B-class (Atlantic 85)	

=== Launching Vehicles ===
Op.No.	Reg No.	Class	On station	Comments
T41	JXR 66	Case LA	1948–1953	
T57	NYE 351	Fowler Challenger III	1953–1964	
TW03	RLJ 367R	Talus MB-764 County	1992–1996	
TW40	P472 PUJ	Talus MB-764 County	1996–2002	
TW54Hc	DU02 WEJ	Talus MB4H Hydrostatic (Mk2)	2002–2009	
TW46Hb	V938 EAW	Talus MB4H Hydrostatic (Mk1.5)	2009–2013	The first MkII Bendy
TW28H	N671 UAW	Talus MB4H Hydrostatic (Mk3)	2013–2014	
TW19Hc	J120 VNT	Talus MB4H Hydrostatic (Mk2)	2014–	

== See also ==
- List of RNLI stations
- List of former RNLI stations
- Royal National Lifeboat Institution lifeboats
- Talus Atlantic 85 DO-DO launch carriage
