= Fowey Lifeboat Station =

RNLI lifeboat station in Cornwall, England

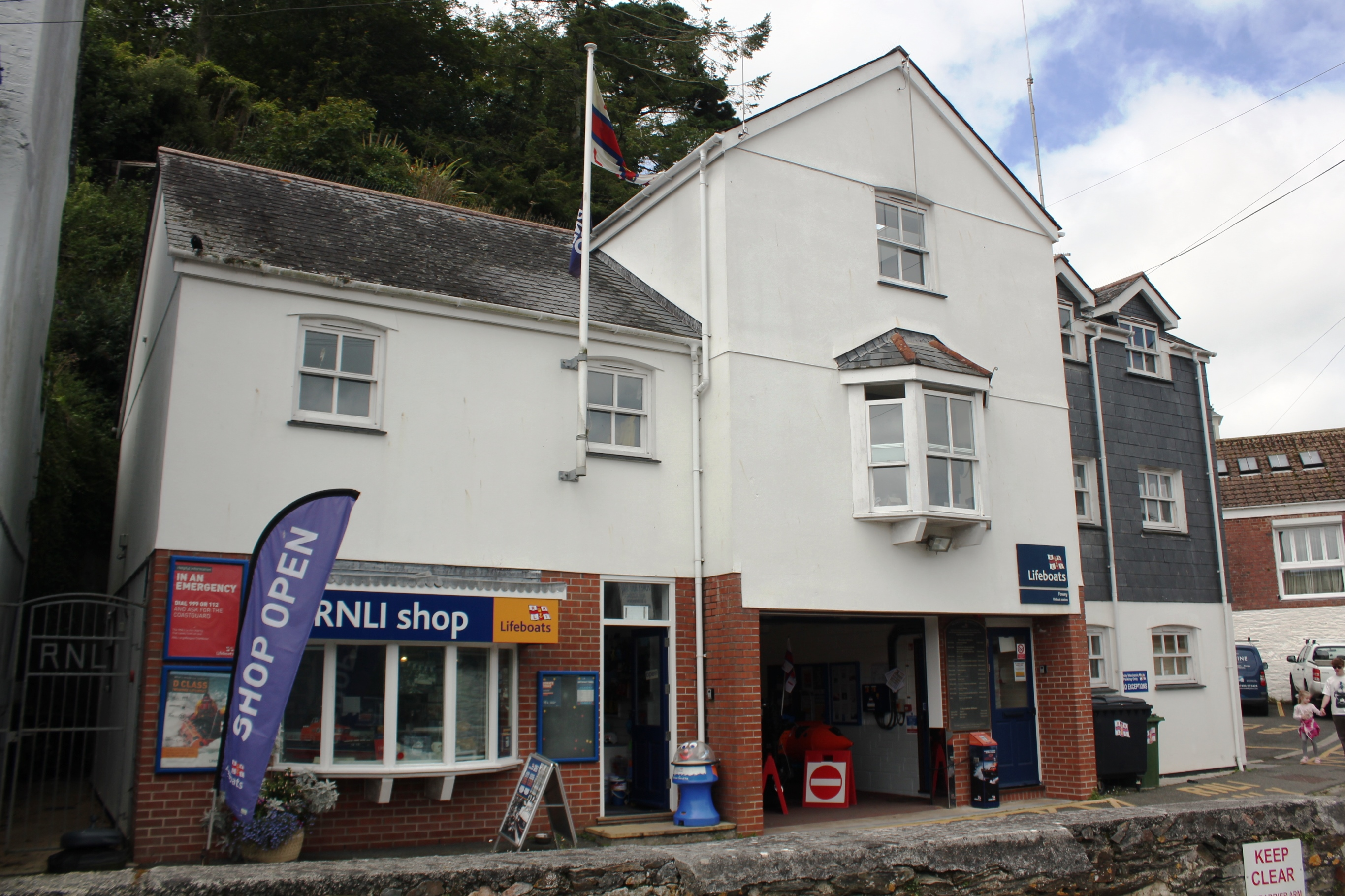
- Fowey Lifeboat Station

- Location within Cornwall
- Former names: Polkerris Lifeboat Station; Polkerris and Fowey Lifeboat Station

General information
- Type: Lifeboat Station
- Location: 11 Passage St, Fowey, Cornwall, PL23 1DE, United Kingdom
- Coordinates: 50.338778°N 4.632306°W
- Opened: 1859 at Polkerris; 1922 at Fowey; Current boathouse 1997
- Owner: Royal National Lifeboat Institution

Website
- Fowey RNLI Lifeboat Station

Fowey Lifeboat Station (/ˈfɔɪ/ FOY; Cornish: Fowydh) can be found on Passage Street in Fowey, a town approximately 20 mi (32 km) north-east of Truro, on the eastern shore of the Gribben peninsula, overlooking the River Fowey, in the English county of Cornwall.

Fowey lifeboat station was initially established at Polkerris in 1859, a small village 2 mi (3.2 km) from Fowey, on the western side of the Gribben peninsula. The lifeboat station was relocated to Fowey in 1922.

The station currently operates a B-class (Atlantic 85) Inshore lifeboat, Spirit of Daisy (B-956), on station since 2026, and a smaller D-class (IB1) Inshore lifeboat, Olive Three (D-817), on station since 2017.

== History ==
Fowey stands at the mouth of the River Fowey where it forms a natural deep water harbour. The town has a long history of fishing and merchant shipping, although the present quays busy with ships loading china clay were only developed in the 1860s. To the west lies St Austell Bay which includes Par Docks built in the 1840s to handle the mineral traffic from the Joseph Treffry mines and quarries, and Charlestown which had been established about fifty years earlier by Charles Rashleigh.

Ever since its founding in 1824, the Royal National Institution for the Preservation of Life from Shipwreck (RNIPLS), later to become the RNLI in 1854, would award medals for deeds of gallantry at sea, even if no lifeboats were involved. On 26 August 1826, despite being badly injured during the rescue, Lt. John Else, RN, of H.M. Coastguard (Polkerris) was instrumental in saving the eight crew of the ship Providence of Par, and was subsequently awarded the RNIPLS Gold Medal. Thomas Crosswell, Chief Officer, H.M. Coastguard (Porthpean), was awarded the RNIPLS Silver Medal for the rescue of crew from the vessel Diligence on 19 August 1829.

On 6 May 1856, the schooner Endeavour of Ipswich, on passage from Dartmouth to Charlestown, was driven ashore at Polkerris Bay during a gale. Despite the efforts of several rescuers, just one man was saved. Three RNLI Silver Medals were awarded.

=== Polkerris ===
The position of the mouth of the River Fowey meant that it would be nearly impossible to launch a lifeboat during the more dangerous storms, when the wind blew from the south. It was decided to station the lifeboat at Polkerris, a small fishing village with a breakwater, on the east side of St Austell Bay.

At a meeting of the RNLI committee of management on Thursday 2 June 1859, it was recorded that local landowner William Rashleigh of Menabilly had offered a sum of £50 towards the provision of a lifeboat at Polkerris, and the site and stone for the construction of a boathouse. A further £50 was offered by J. F. Buller of Morval, and £25 from the Hon. Thomas Agar-Robartes, MP for East Cornwall. It was noted that a lifeboat and carriage were to be ordered forthwith.

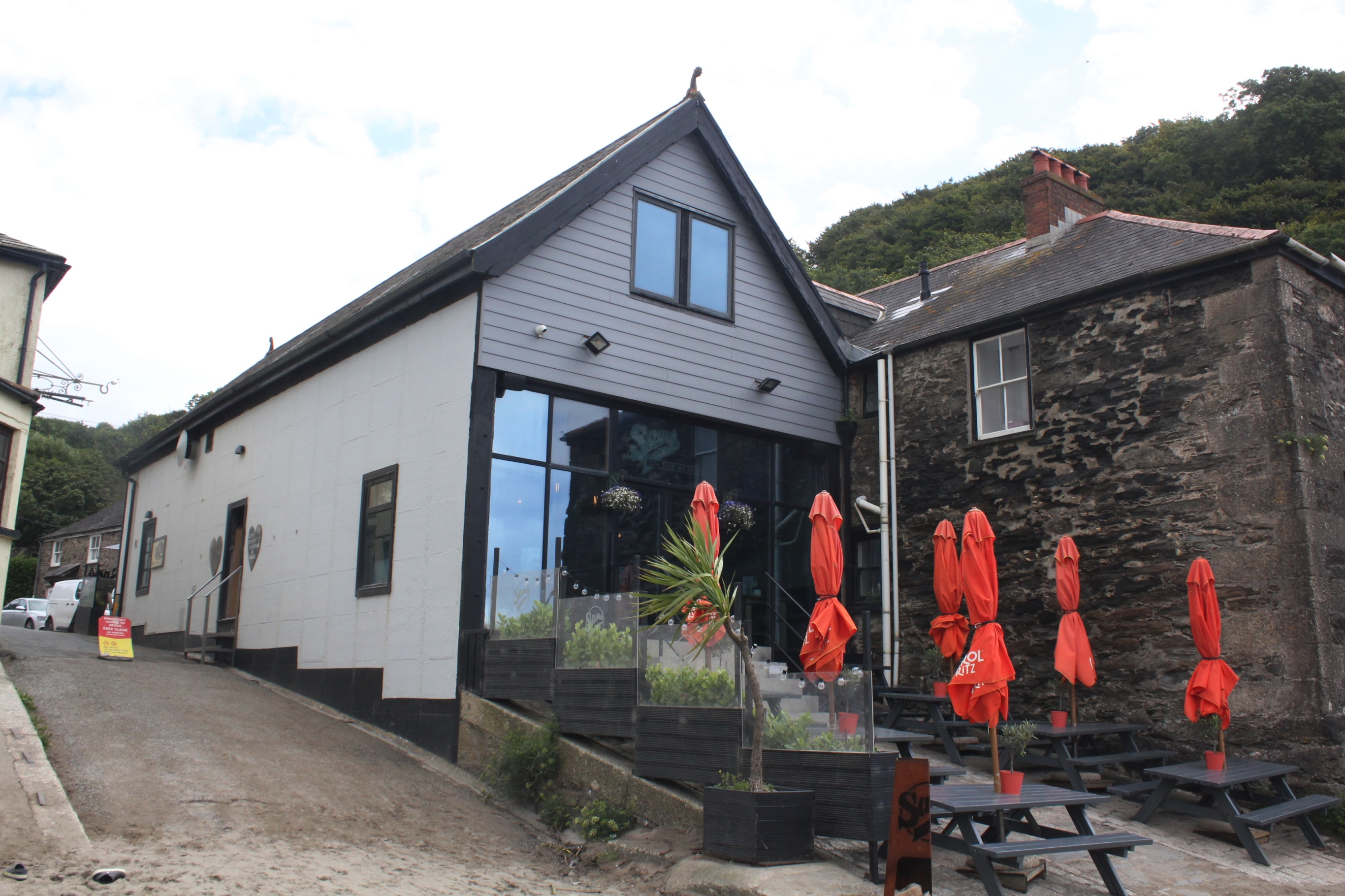
The 1904 lifeboat house at Polkerris is now a café.

A boathouse was constructed at Polkerris, at a cost of £138-4s, and a 30-foot-long (9.1 m) Peake-class 'Pulling and Sailing' (P&S) lifeboat, one with sails, and six oars, single-banked, costing £135-10s, was dispatched to the station. The boat and carriage were conveyed free of charge to Lostwithiel railway station in November 1859, via the Great Western, Bristol and Exeter, South Devon and Cornwall Railway Companies.

Following her arrival at Lostwithiel, the boat was rowed down river through Fowey and around to St Austell Bay, arriving at Charlestown, where it was met with great delight, all the vessels in the harbour flying their colours in approval. "She will be available for the protection of vessels running ashore in any part of St. Austle Bay, on the eastern extremity of which is the small village of Polkerris. On the conveyance of this boat to her station, from Fowey, by her crew, she was to some extent tested, and her crew formed a high estimate of her qualities." The lifeboat was named Catherine Rashleigh, after William's wife, who was another of the major donors towards its cost.

In 1866, the station was provided with a 32 ft (9.8 m) ten-oared lifeboat, the Rochdale and Catherine Rashleigh, the larger lifeboat requiring alterations to the boathouse.

Since being established in 1859, the station was known as Fowey Lifeboat Station, even though being located in Polkerris. In 1892, the name was changed to Polkerris Lifeboat Station, but just four years later in 1896, it changed again, to the compromise of Polkerris and Fowey Lifeboat Station..

In 1904, a new boathouse was constructed at Polkerris, at a cost of £850.

During a launch in 1908 a chain broke, and an inspection of the station found that the gradient changed three times in the boathouse and slipway; this was altered by February 1909 to make launching safer.

Several requests were made around this time for a lifeboat be stationed at Fowey, but the RNLI decided that Polkerris was operating efficiently. Following World War I, the RNLI began the move towards operating motor lifeboats, and it was decided that Fowey would be a better location for such a boat. At a meeting of the committee of management on Friday 23 June 1922, it was decided that Polkerris Lifeboat Station would be closed, and a new station established at Fowey, once again being named Fowey Lifeboat Station. The disused station building at Polkerris was later converted to be a café.

=== Fowey ===
Despite the promise of a motor lifeboat, the first boat stationed at Fowey was a 12-oared pulling and sailing boat. It was kept moored afloat in the river near Town Quay, where the crew had use of a building on the waterfront. Previously named William Roberts at Littlehaven, the lifeboat was already 23-years-old, and just four years later in August 1928, the boat was declared unfit for service.

A 45-foot 6in Watson motor lifeboat, intended for Thurso, the H.C.J. (ON 708), was stationed at Fowey for a few months, until Fowey's new boat, C.D.E.C. (ON 712), arrived on station on 6 December 1928. Fitted with twin 40-bhp engines, it had a maximum speed of 8 knots (15 km/h) and could operate up to 78 nautical miles (144 km) from her station. C.D.E.C. served at Fowey until November 1954, launching on service 65 times and saving 49 lives.

On 24 November 1954, a new 46-foot 9in Watson-class lifeboat, Deneys Reitz (ON 919), went on station, and spent her entire career at Fowey, until being withdrawn in May 1980. She had launched on service 155 times, saving 36 lives.

Between 1980 and 1982, Fowey saw a succession of three Watson-class lifeboats. A much older 45-foot 6in Watson-class from the relief fleet, Gertrude (ON 847), built in 1946, was at Fowey for eighteen months until November 1981. Next was the 46-foot 9in Watson Guy and Clare Hunter (ON 926), previously at St Mary's, but served less than two months, before being sent to replace the ill-fated Solomon Browne at Penlee. Another older 46-foot 9in Watson, Charles Henry Ashley (ON 866), again from the relief fleet, was on station until 1982.

On 16 October 1982 a new type of craft took up station, the first of its class to be put into service. 33-03 Leonore Chilcott (ON 1083) was a Brede-class lifeboat. Powered by twin 203-hp Caterpillar diesel engines, these "intermediate" lifeboats were not able to operate in storms above Force 8, but otherwise could operate at up to 20 knots (37 km/h) and had a range of 140 nautical miles (260 km).

Leonore Chilcott served for five years, before being replaced by the older but larger Waveney-class Thomas Forehead & Mary Rowse II (ON 1028), previously at Plymouth. The Waveney served at Fowey for more than 8 1/2 years, launching on service 169 times and saving 35 lives.

The RNLI started to provide small, fast inshore rescue boats in the 1960s, but it was not until August 1996 that one was stationed at Fowey. The harbour at Mevagissey had been considered as a possible ILB station but no suitable site could be found. The small D-class (EA16) inflatable was initially kept in a wooden container at Berrill's Yard and launched using a davit near the ALB's moorings which had recently been moved from Town Quay. On 4 October 1997, a unique triple ceremony took place at Fowey to bring into service not just a new purpose-built lifeboat station Berrill's Yard at but also to christen the station's two new lifeboats at the time, the Trent-class All-weather lifeboat 14-18 Maurice and Joyce Hardy (ON 1222) and the D Class ILB Olive Herbert (D-526).

Following a coastal review by the RNLI, it was announced in February 2025, that on retirement from service, the Trent-class lifeboat at Fowey would be replaced by a 35-knot B-class (Atlantic 85) Inshore lifeboat. Maurice and Joyce Hardy (ON 1222) was withdrawn in August 2025.

=== Description ===
The three-storey lifeboat station was built in 1997 in a style that blends with the older buildings around it. The gabled central section has covered facilities for the IRB at ground floor level and a small bow window at first floor level. On the left is a two-storey wing which includes a fund-raising RNLI shop. The right hand wing is three storeys high. It is on the landward side of Passage Street opposite the IRB's launch site and the ALB's moorings.

=== Area of operation ===
The RNLI aims to reach any casualty up to 50 miles (80 km) from its stations, and within two hours in good weather. To do this the Atlantic 85 at Fowey has an operating range of 2.5 hours and a top speed of 35 knots (65 km/h). Adjacent lifeboats are an ILB at Looe and an ALB at Plymouth to the east, and both and ALB and ILB at Falmouth to the west.

== Service awards ==
Two large sailing ships ran aground in a strong gale near Par harbour on 25 November 1865. The Catherine Rashleigh put to sea from Polkerris under the command of Joshua Heath, but lost four oars before she reached the ships. The crew of one vessel then launched their own small boat, but this broke away, with just one man and the ship's cat on board. The lifeboat managed to reach them and took them to Par, where they took on some replacement oars and returned to the grounded ships. After landing 13 men from the larger vessel at Par, and taking on two fresh rowers, the lifeboat returned to rescue the remaining nine people. The whole rescue took five hours, with Joshua Heath being awarded the RNLI Silver Medal.

Before dawn on 23 March 1947, distress signals were reported near Par Sands. Relief lifeboat The Brothers set out from Fowey at 04:40. After an hour's search through rain-swept heavy seas a sunken ship was found near Killyvarder Rock, with the crew gathered on a small part that was still out of the water. The tide was rising and so the lifeboat swiftly moved in but had to haul the men on a rope through the sea. Lifeboat Coxswain Joseph Watters was awarded the RNLI Bronze Medal and the efforts of his crew were also recognised.

The following awards have been made at Polkerris and Fowey:

- RNIPLS Gold Medal
  Lt. John Else, RN, H.M. Coastguard, Polkerris – 1826
- RNIPLS Silver Medal
  Thomas Crosswell, Chief Officer, H.M. Coastguard, Porthpean – 1829
- RNLI Silver Medal
  Cmdr. George Lowcay Norcock, RN, Inspecting Commander, H.M. Coastguard, Polkerris – 1856
  Thomas Henwood, Boatman, H.M. Coastguard, Fowey – 1856
  Richard Jones, Merchant Seaman – 1856
  Joshua Heath, Coxswain – 1865
  William Robins, Seaman – 1893
  Edwin Robins, Seaman – 1893
  George Bishop, Seaman – 1893
  Frederick Perring, Seaman – 1893
  William Penrose, Farmer – 1906
- RNLI Bronze Medal
  Joseph Watters, Coxswain – 1947
- The Thanks of the Institution inscribed on Vellum
  James Turpin, Assistant Mechanic – 1958
- A Framed Letter of Thanks signed by the Chairman of the Institution
  Keith Stuart, Coxswain – 2006

== Polkerris and Fowey lifeboats ==
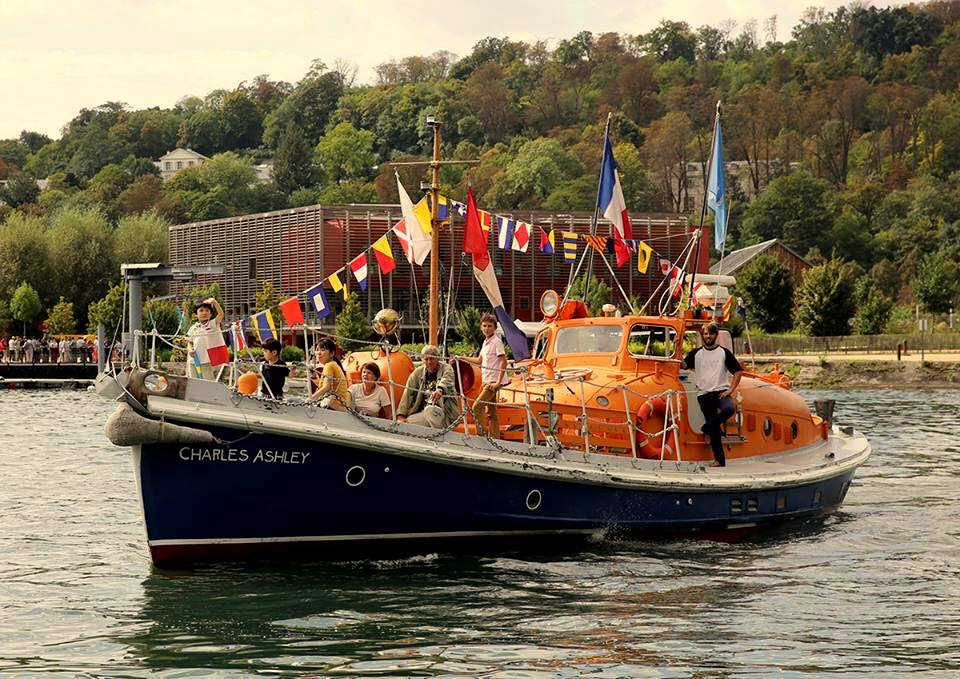
Charles Henry Ashley (ON 866) (1982)

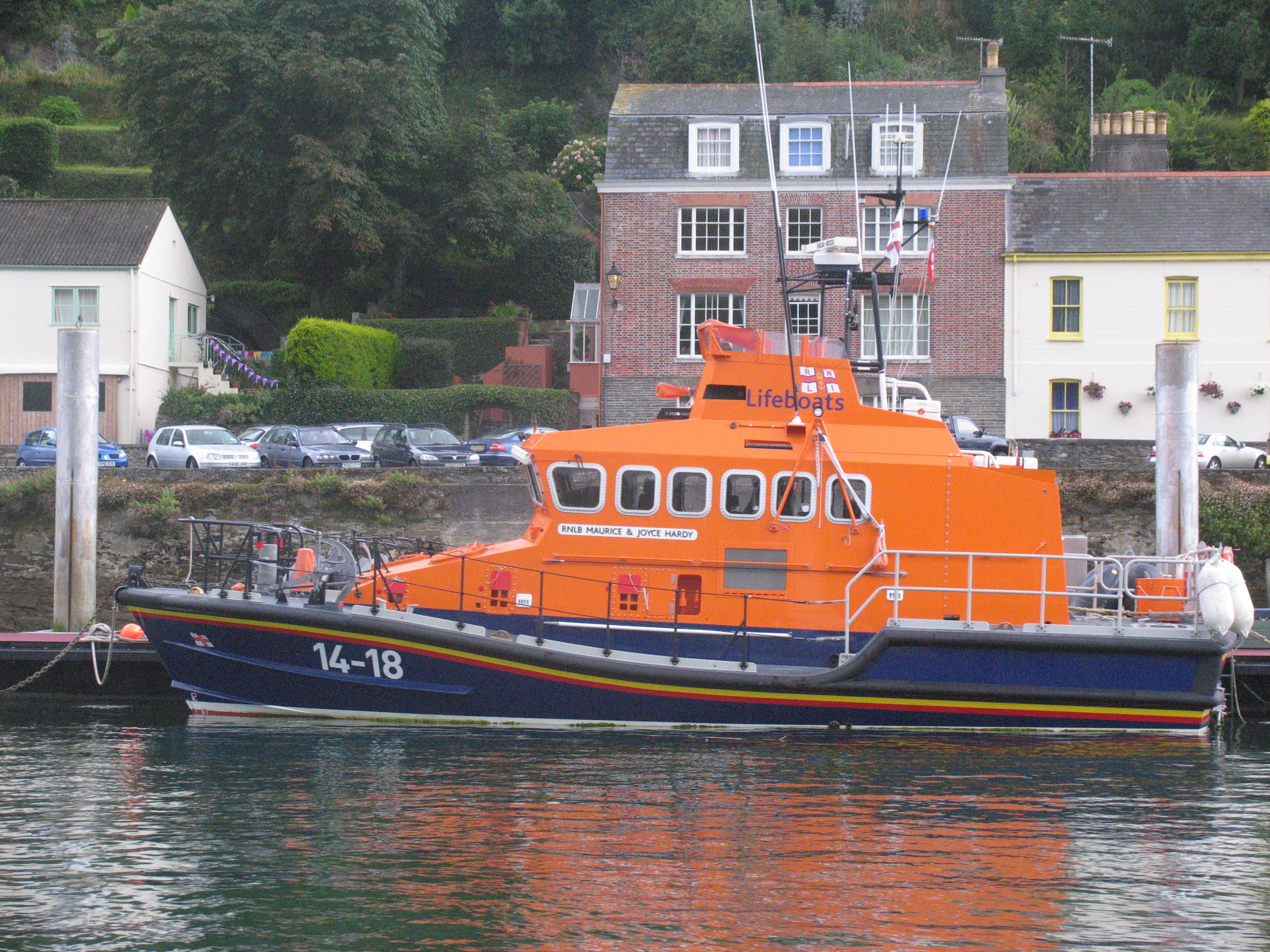
Maurice and Joyce Hardy (ON 1222) (1996 to 2025)

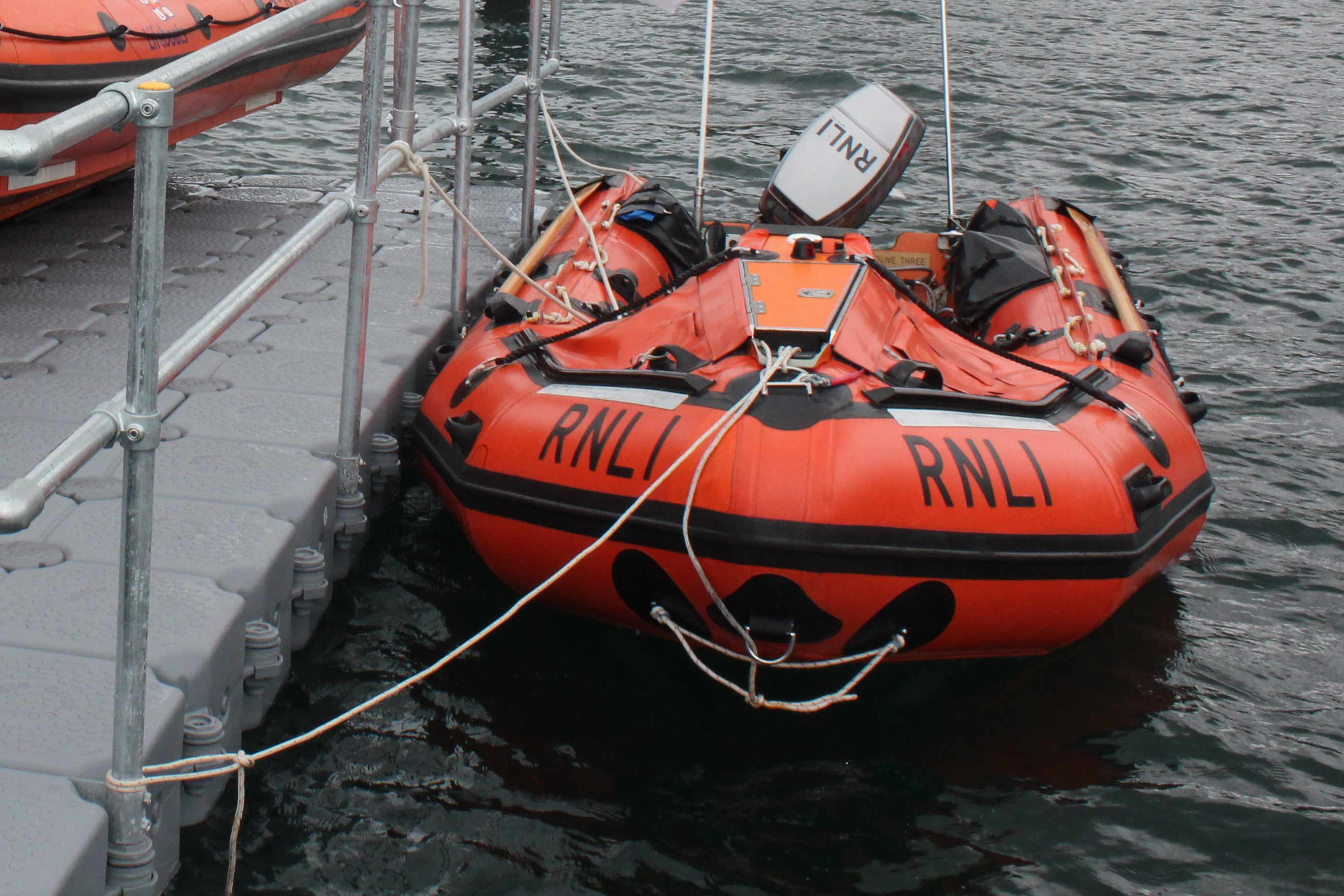
Olive Three (D-817) (from 2017)

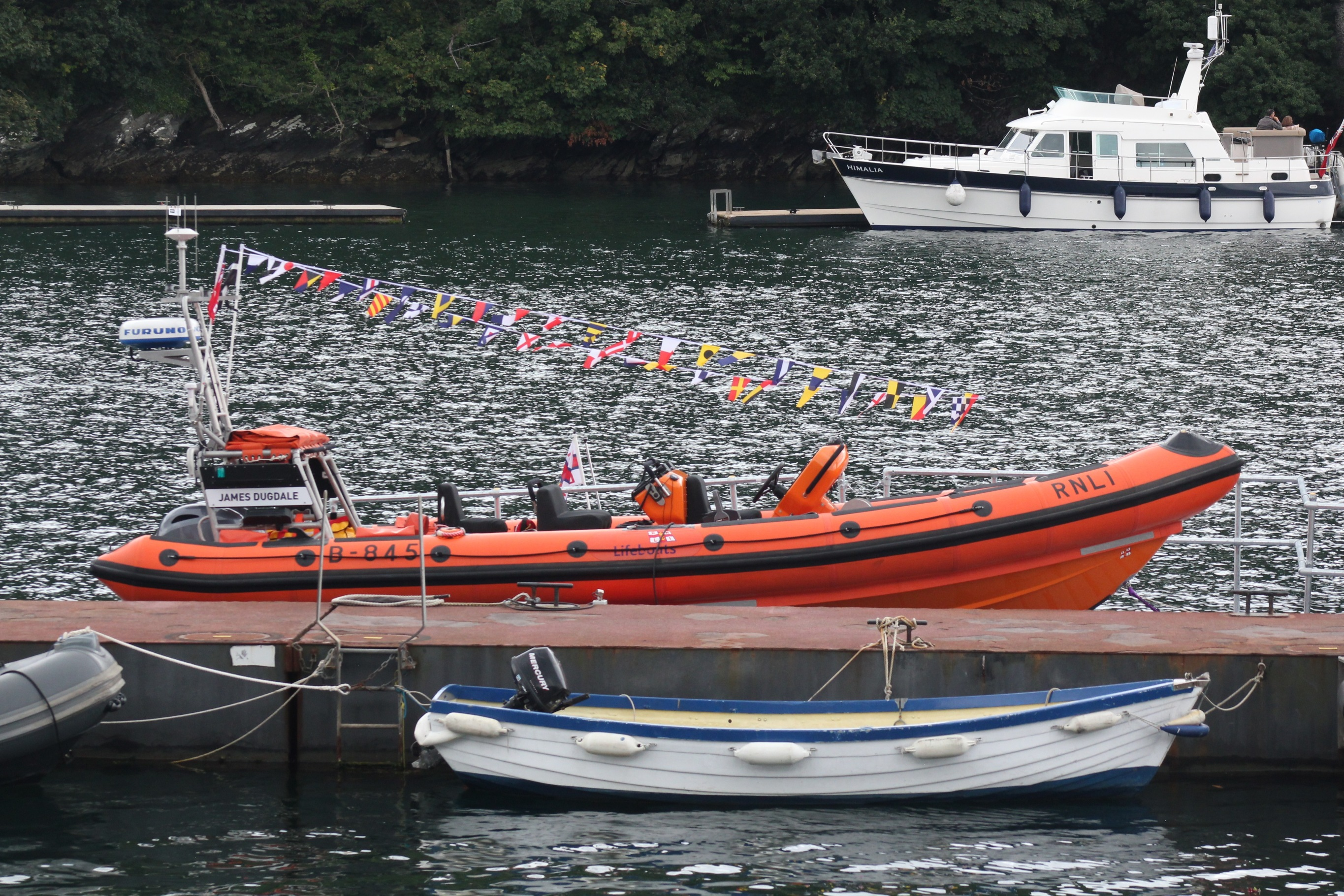
James Dugdale (B-845)(from 2025)

=== Pulling and sailing lifeboats ===
On station	ON (Note: ON is the RNLI's Official Number of the boat.)	Name	Built	Class	Comments
1859–1866	Pre-348	Catherine Rashleigh	1859	30-foot Peake Self-righting (P&S)	(Note: 30 ft 0 in (9.14 m) x 7 ft 0 in (2.13 m) (6-oared) Peake-class self-righting (P&S) lifeboat, gift of the fund of the Hon. Mrs Rashleigh of Menabilly, built by Forrestt of Limehouse, London, costing £136.); Broken up in 1867.
1866–1875	Pre-473	Rochdale and Catherine Rashleigh	1866	32-foot Prowse Self-righting (P&S)	(Note: 32 ft 0 in (9.75 m) x 7 ft 5 in (2.26 m) (10-oared) Prowse-class self-righting (P&S) lifeboat, gift of the fund of the Hon. Mrs Rashleigh of Menabilly, built by Forrestt of Limehouse, London, costing £262.); Renamed Rochdale in 1875.
1875–1879	Pre-473	Rochdale	1866	32-foot Prowse Self-righting (P&S)	Renamed Arthur Hill in 1879.
1879–1887	Pre-473	Arthur Hill	1866	32-foot Prowse Self-righting (P&S)	(Note: Gift of the Arthur Hill Memorial Fund.); Sold from service, 1891.
1887–1904	136	Arthur Hill	1887	34-foot Self-righting (P&S)	(Note: 34 ft 0 in (10.36 m) x 7 ft 6 in (2.29 m) (10-oared) self-righting (P&S) lifeboat, gift of the Arthur Hill Memorial Fund, built by Forrestt of Limehouse, London, costing £406.); Broken up in 1904.
1904–1922	515	James, William and Caroline Courtenay	1904	35-foot Watson (P&S)	(Note: 35 ft 0 in (10.67 m) x 9 ft 0 in (2.74 m) (12-oared) Watson-class non-self-righting (P&S) lifeboat, legacy of Mrs C. Courtney of Exmouth, built by Thames Ironworks of Blackwall, London, costing £1,241.); Sold in 1922. Renamed Grey Fox. Last reported derelict, at Anchor Bay moorings, Erith, October 2023.
1922–1926	394	James, William and Caroline Courteney	1896	40-foot Self-righting (P&S)	(Note: 40 ft 0 in (12.19 m) x 10 ft 4 in (3.15 m) (12-oared) self-righting (P&S) lifeboat, gift of the Civil Service LB fund, built by Hansen of East Cowes, costing £649 when new. Renamed at Fowey via the legacy of Mrs C. Courtney of Exmouth.); Previously Civil Service No.4 at Walmer, and reserve No.3 at Selsey. Sold from service, 1927.
1926–1928	505	Reserve No. 7C	1903	40-foot Watson (P&S)	(Note: 40 ft 0 in (12.19 m) x 11 ft 0 in (3.35 m) (12-oared) Watson-class non-self-righting (P&S) lifeboat, legacy of Mr W. Roberts of Manchester, built by Thames Ironworks of Blackwall, London, costing £1,606 when new.); Previously William Roberts at Littlehaven. Sold 1928. Renamed Quest, used as a yacht until it was broken up at Hayling Island in 2009.

Pre ON numbers are unofficial numbers used by the Lifeboat Enthusiasts' Society to reference early lifeboats not included on the official RNLI list.

=== Motor lifeboats ===
On station	ON	Op. No. (Note: Op. No. is the RNLI's Operational Number of the boat carried on the hull.)	Name	Built	Class	Comments
1928	708	—	H. C. J.	1928	45-foot 6in Watson	Later stationed at Holyhead and Thurso. Sold 1962. Renamed The Mary Dolan, later Seawitch. At Castletown, Isle of Man, July 2025.
1928–1954	712	—	C. D. E. C.	1928	45-foot 6in Watson	Sold 1959. Renamed Thameserver, last reported semi-derelict at Leigh-on-Sea, October 2023.
1954–1980	919	—	Deneys Reitz	1954	46-foot 9in Watson	Sold 1980. Last reported at Södermanland, Sweden in 2018.
1980–1981	847	—	Gertrude	1946	46-foot Watson	Previously at Holy Island. Sold 1982. In use at Mevagissey, December 2025
1981–1982	926	—	Guy and Clare Hunter	1955	46-foot 9in Watson	Previously at St Mary's. Transferred to Penlee
1982	866	—	Charles Henry Ashley	1949	46-foot 9in Watson	Previously at Porthdinllaen. Sold in 1987 and now in use at Port de Hyères as Charles Ashley, May 2025
1982–1987	1083	33-03	Leonore Chilcott	1982	Brede	Sold in 1990. After working as a survey boat Privateer in Kent, it is now a pilot boat Leonore Chilcott at Braye, Alderney, October 2025
1987–1996	1028	44-010	Thomas Foreland and Mary Rowse II	1974	Waveney	Initially stationed at Plymouth until transferred to Fowey. Sold to New Zealand Coastguard in 1999 as lifeboat Westgate Rescue at New Plymouth. Last reported in private use as Harrier at Fiordland, April 2019.
1996–2025	1222	14-18	Maurice and Joyce Hardy	1996	Trent	Withdrawn from service August 2025.

More post-service details can be found on the respective lifeboat class pages.

=== Inshore lifeboats ===
==== D-class and A-class ====
On station	Op. No.	Name	Class	Comments
1996–1997	D-390	Tiger D	D-class (EA16)	Initially stationed at Porthcawl in 1989.
1997	D-433	Marjorie	D-class (EA16)	Initially deployed as a relief lifeboat in 1992.
1997–2007	D-526	Olive Herbert	D-class (EA16)	
2007–2017	D-681	Olive Two	D-class (IB1)	
2013–2017	A-68	Malcolm Hawkesford II	Arancia	Used as a boarding boat.
2017–	D-817	Olive Three	D-class (IB1)	

==== B-class ====
On station	Op. No.	Name	Class	Comments
2025–2026	B-845	James Dugdale	B-class (Atlantic 85)	
2026–	B-956	Spirit of Daisy	B-class (Atlantic 85)	

== See also ==
- List of RNLI stations
- List of former RNLI stations
- Royal National Lifeboat Institution lifeboats
