= Hauxley Lifeboat Station =

Former lifeboat station in Northumberland, England

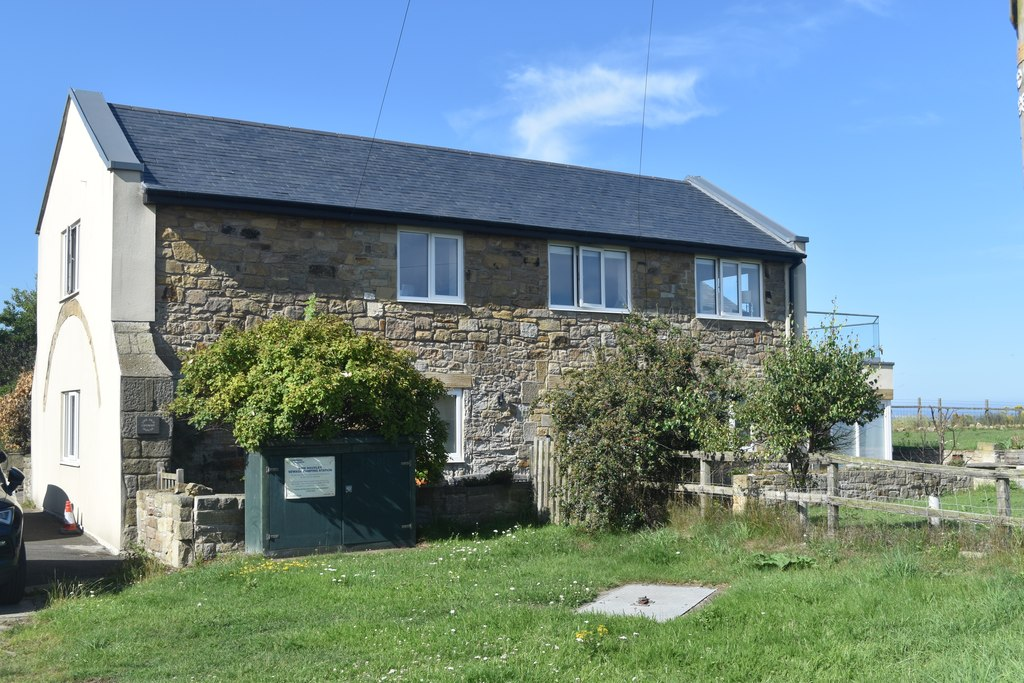
- Hauxley Old Lifeboat House

- Location within Northumberland

General information
- Status: Closed
- Type: RNLI Lifeboat Station
- Location: The Old Boat House, Low Hauxley, Northumberland, NE65 0JS, England
- Coordinates: 55°19′07.1″N 1°33′03.8″W
- Opened: 1852
- Closed: 1939

Hauxley Lifeboat Station was located in Low Hauxley, a village near Amble, approximately 10 miles (16 km) south-east of Alnwick, in the county of Northumberland.

The Warkworth Harbour lifeboat was first stationed at Hauxley by the Newcastle Shipwreck Association (NSA) in 1852. Management of the station was transferred to the Royal National Institution for the Preservation of Life from Shipwreck (RNIPLS) in 1853, which became the Royal National Lifeboat Institution (RNLI) in 1854.

Hauxley lifeboat station was closed, when a motor-powered lifeboat was placed at Amble in 1939.

== History ==
A lifeboat was placed at Low Hauxley in 1852, managed by the Newcastle Shipwreck Association (NSA), when it was decided that it was a better location than Amble to station a carriage-launched lifeboat. Amble lifeboat station was closed.

A site at Hauxley was provided by Capt. S. F. Widdrington, RN. A boathouse was constructed, and a 30-foot self-righting lifeboat, costing £200, was commissioned with Teasdel of Great Yarmouth, all funded by local dignitary, Algernon Percy, 4th Duke of Northumberland. A carriage was constructed by Rutherford, costing £49-11s-0d. The boat arrived at Hauxley on the 8 September 1852, and was named Warkworth. In 1853, the station became part of the Royal National Institution for the Preservation of Life from Shipwreck (RNIPLS), which would become the RNLI in 1854.

Warkworth would serve for three years at Hauxley, launching on service only 4 times, but saving 20 lives. Remarkably, all four launches were within a five-day period. In a storm of 6 January 1854, Warkworth was launched to the aid of the Monarch of Guernsey, rescuing all 10 crew. Later the same day, a second launch saved six people from the Earl of Newburgh, of South Shields.
The storm raged on, and on 9 January, the lifeboat saved the crew of four from the Heroine of Burnham. Sadly, the lifeboat launched on its fourth service on the 10 January 1854 to the Catherine Maria of Odense in Denmark, but the ship broke up, and all lives were lost.
Awards were made, see Station honours.

Hauxley would receive a replacement lifeboat in 1855, a 30-foot unnamed Peake-class lifeboat, built by Forrestt of Limehouse and costing £156, once again funded by the Duke of Northumberland. She was transported from London on the steam ship Pioneer to Newcastle-upon-Tyne, from where she was towed north, arriving in Hauxley on 7 August 1855. On 4 January 1857, she would be launched twice, firstly being taken 3 miles down the coast, and launched to the aid of the Sophie of Oporto, rescuing the crew of 11. The lifeboat would then go the aid of the Georgina of Inverness, rescuing a further five men. For these services, Capt. Hipplewhite received the RNLI Silver Medal

In 1865, Hauxley would receive their third lifeboat. A 34-foot Self-righting (P&S) boat constructed by Forrestt at a cost of £295, she arrived in Hauxley in 1866 after being conveyed by the Great Northern and North Eastern Railway companies free of charge. Modification were carried out to the boathouse, and a new carriage was required, costing £163 in total. The recently deceased Duke of Northumberland had been president of both the RNIPLS and the RNLI, and all costs were met by his wife, Eleanor Percy, Duchess of Northumberland, in memory of her late husband, the boat being named Algernon and Eleanor.

A further two lifeboat would be supplied to Hauxley. In 1887, a 37-foot 12-oar Self-righting (P&S) lifeboat, costing built by D & W Henderson of Partick, Glasgow, and again named Algernon and Eleanor (ON 195). Then in 1902, a 34-foot 10-oar Self-righting (P&S) lifeboat, constructed by Thames Ironworks at £598. Provided by a legacy from Miss M Andrew, of Hale, Cheshire, the boat was named Mary Andrew (ON 483). Two coxswains would be awarded the RNLI Silver Medal for their long service, James Armstrong in 1885, and later Andrew Oliver in 1899.

The Hauxley lifeboats were launched a total of 81 times, and save 246 lives. It was only when the RNLI decided to reopen the station at Amble with a motor powered 45ft Watson-class lifeboat, the Frederick and Emma (ON 659), that Mary Andrew was withdrawn from service, and the Hauxley station was closed in 1939.

The lifeboat house still exists, and today is a private residence.

== Station honours ==
The following are awards made at Hauxley.

- RNIPLS Silver Medal

Middleton Henry Dand, Land Owner – 1849

- RNLI Silver Medal

Middleton Henry Dand, Land Owner – 1854 (Second-Service clasp)

Capt. Thomas Hipplewhite, Warkworth Harbour Master – 1857

James Armstrong, Coxswain – 1885

Andrew Oliver, Coxswain – 1899

John Dawson Armstrong, Colliery Bank Keeper – 1910

- The Thanks of the Institution inscribed on Vellum

Capt. Hipplewhite, Warkworth Harbour Master, Coxswain – 1854

Capt. Hipplewhite, Warkworth Harbour Master, Coxswain – 1858
Middleton Henry Dand, Land Owner – 1858

== Hauxley lifeboats ==
=== Pulling and Sailing (P&S) lifeboats ===
ON (Note: ON is the RNLI's Official Number of the boat.)	Name	Built	On station	Class	Comments
Pre-254	Warkworth	1852	1852−1855	30-foot Peake Self-righting (P&S)	(Note: 30-foot x 8-foot 9in (12-oared) Peake-class self-righting (P&S) lifeboat, gift of Algernon Percy, 4th Duke of Northumberland, built by Teasdel of Great Yarmouth, costing £200.)
Pre-292	Unnamed	1855	1855−1866	30-foot Peake Self-righting (P&S)	(Note: 30-foot x 7-foot 9in (10-oared) Peake-class self-righting (P&S) lifeboat, gift of Algernon Percy, 4th Duke of Northumberland, built by Forrestt of Limehouse, London, costing £156.)
Pre-448	Algernon and Eleanor	1865	1866−1888	34-foot Self-righting (P&S)	(Note: 34-foot x 8-foot 5in (10-oared) self-righting (P&S) lifeboat, gift of the Eleanor Percy, Duchess of Northumberland,built by Forrestt of Limehouse, London, costing £295. Gift of The Duchess of Northumberland.)
195	Algernon and Eleanor	1888	1888−1902	37-foot Self-righting (P&S)	(Note: 37-foot x 8-foot (12-oared) self-righting (P&S) lifeboat, gift of the Duchess of Northumberland, built by D. and W. Henderson and Company of Partick, costing £474.)
483	Mary Andrew	1902	1902−1939	34-foot Dungeness Self-righting (P&S)	(Note: 34-foot x 8-foot (10-oared) Dungeness-class (Rubie) self-righting (P&S) lifeboat, legacy of Miss Andrew of Hale, Cheshire, built by Thames Ironworks of Blackwall, London, costing £598.)

Pre ON numbers are unofficial numbers used by the Lifeboat Enthusiast Society to reference early lifeboats not included on the official RNLI list.

== See also ==
- List of RNLI stations
- List of former RNLI stations
- Royal National Lifeboat Institution lifeboats
