= Amble Lifeboat Station =

RNLI Lifeboat station in Northumberland, England

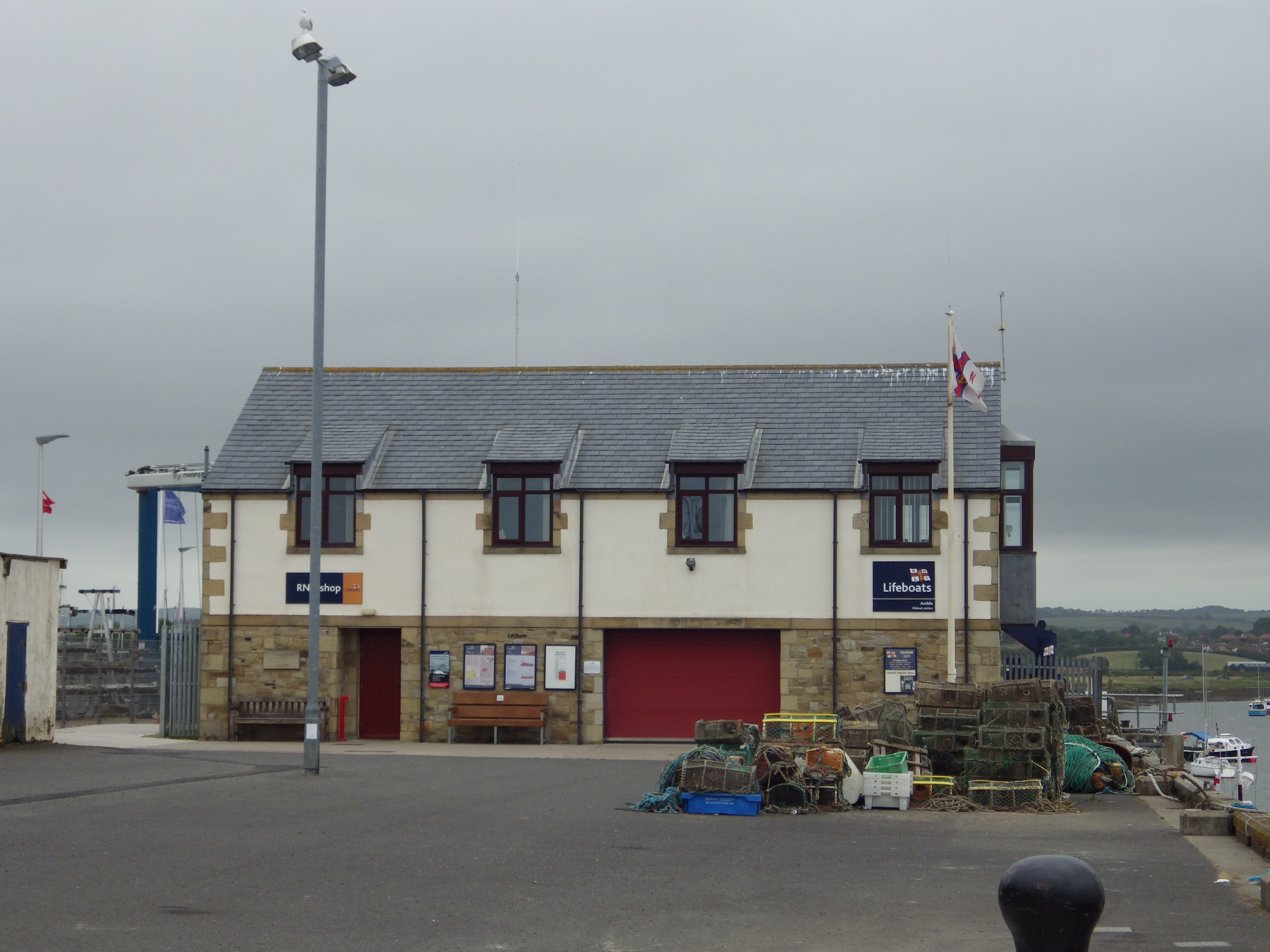
- Amble Lifeboat Station

- Location within Northumberland

General information
- Type: RNLI Lifeboat Station
- Location: Radcliffe Quay, Warkworth Harbour, Amble, Northumberland, NE65 0DJ, England
- Coordinates: 55°20′11.2″N 1°34′54.0″W
- Opened: 1842–1852/56; 1939–present
- Owner: Royal National Lifeboat Institution

Website
- Amble RNLI Lifeboat Station

Amble Lifeboat Station is located at Radcliffe Quay, Warkworth Harbour, in the town of Amble, at the mouth of the River Coquet, in the county of Northumberland.

A lifeboat was first stationed at Amble in 1843, by the Royal National Institution for the Preservation of Life from Shipwreck (RNIPLS). The Amble station was deemed to have closed in 1852, when a lifeboat was placed at Hauxley in 1852, considered a more suitable location for the "Warkworth Harbour lifeboat".

The station at Amble was re-established by the Royal National Lifeboat Institution (RNLI) in 1939, following the deployment of a new motor-powered lifeboat, unsuitable for the Hauxley station, which was closed.

The station currently operates a Shannon-class All-weather lifeboat, 13-16 Elizabeth and Leonard (ON 1323), on station since 2016, and a D-class (IB1) Inshore lifeboat Alf and Dora Whiting (D-867), on station since 2022.

== History ==
The early history of Amble Lifeboat Station is somewhat confused, with conflicting reports and dates. The first lifeboat stationed at Amble was the Blythe, which had first been stationed at Blyth. The lifeboat capsized on service in 1841, with the loss of 10 lifeboat crew. It is reported that the lifeboat was placed at Amble by the RNIPLS in 1842, but it is known that the boat was placed for sale in March 1843, and was only transferred to Amble when it didn't sell.

In order to comply with the Harbours, Docks and Piers Clauses Act 1847, the harbour commissioners were required by law to provide a lifeboat and other rescue equipment. At a time when the RNIPLS was in decline, a lifeboat and Manby Rocket equipment were provided to Warkworth Harbour by the Port of Newcastle Shipwreck Association in 1847, and a boathouse was constructed by the harbour commissioners. With no records available, it must therefore be concluded that this was required because the Blythe was no longer fit for service.

For some time, it was considered that Hauxley would be a far better place to locate the Warkworth Harbour lifeboat, and a station was established at Hauxley in 1852 by the Newcastle Shipwreck Association. A new boat was provided to Hauxley named Warkworth. In order to comply with the Harbours, Docks and Piers Clauses Act 1847, Warkworth Harbour Commissioners would pay a £10 annual subscription for its upkeep.

By 1852, The Duke of Northumberland, who had been a driving force behind the Newcastle Shipwreck Association (NSA), was now president of a much improved RNIPLS, and the NSA transferred management of all its lifeboats to the RNIPLS in 1853. In 1854, the RNIPLS became the RNLI. A new boat was provided to Hauxley in 1855, and the Warkworth was transferred to Bridlington.

The Amble station was set to close. Some documents say this happened in 1852 when Hauxley opened, and some say 1856. It would appear that some of the conflicting dates of closure of Amble, are because the old NSA lifeboat was never actually removed, and remained at Amble until 1856. Even then, it is reported that the Hauxley lifeboat Warkworth replaced the old NSA boat, when it ended up back at Amble from 1856 to 1860. Noted as being "too heavy", it was overwhelmingly rejected by the Bridlington lifeboat crew.

For further information, please see:-

- Hauxley Lifeboat Station

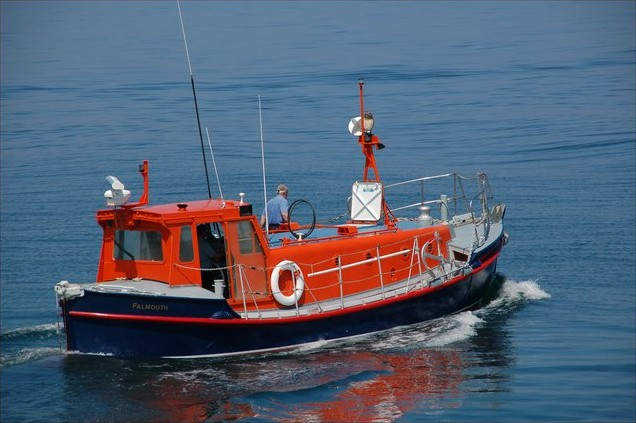
Former Amble Rother-class lifeboat 37-30 Harold Salvesen

In the 1930s, the number of men at Hauxley available to crew the lifeboat was in decline, and the local fishing industry there suffered, when Druridge Bay started being used by the RAF for target practice. With Hauxley not suitable for a motor-lifeboat, it was decided that when one was available, Amble would re-open, and Hauxley would be closed. The Amble station reopened in 1939, with the arrival of a 45-foot Watson lifeboat, the Frederick and Emma (ON 659), previously on service at Wick.

On 5 February 1941, the Government cargo steamship Empire Breeze of Sunderland, on her maiden voyage, ran aground on Bondicar Rocks, south of Hauxley, whilst on passage from Scotland to America. All 42 crew were taken off by the Amble lifeboat, in 3 trips. The ship was later refloated, and repaired, returning to service until 25 August 1942, when she was torpedoed and sunk in mid-atlantic.

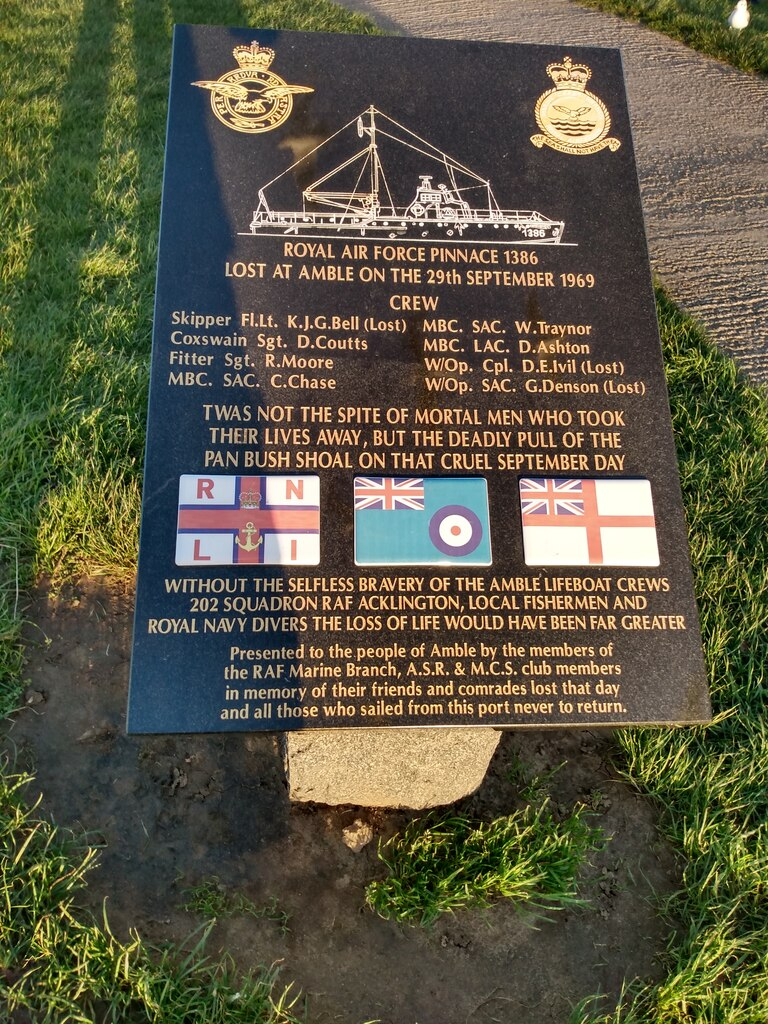
Pinnace 1386 Memorial

An increase in water leisure activity in the 1950s and 60s prompted the RNLI to introduce a small fast inshore D-class lifeboat (ILB) at stations around the country. D-51 was placed at Amble in 1966.

On 29 September 1969, the HMAFV Pinnace 1386 Hullat capsized off the north pier, with seven men aboard. In rough conditions, the ILB was immediately dispatched, and the crew managed to rescue two men clinging to the upturned boat, returning them to the harbour. The 46ft Watson-class lifeboat Millie Watson (ON 848) arrived, rescuing a third man. With knocking heard from inside the upturned boat, it was decided to attempt to tow the boat to better water. Meanwhile, two local divers were taken out to the boat aboard the ILB. Despite everyone's best efforts, access to the boat was impossible. Navy divers from Rosyth later managed to cut a hole in the hull, and rescued the one man left inside. Four RNLI Bronze Medals were awarded to lifeboat crew, two being the first ever awarded to the crew of an Inshore lifeboat.

== Station honours ==
The following are awards made at Amble

- RNLI Bronze Medal

William Henderson, Coxswain – 1970
James Stewart, crew member – 1970
Andrew Barton Scott, ILB crew member – 1970
Robert Wade Stewart, ILB crew member – 1970
The awards to Robert Stewart and Andrew Scott were the first medals for a service carried out in an inshore lifeboat.

- The Ralph Glister Award 1970
  (for the most meritorious service of the year performed by a rescue boat crew)

Andrew Barton Scott, crew member – 1970
Robert Wade Stewart, crew member – 1970

- The Thanks of the Institution inscribed on Vellum

John Connell, Second Coxswain – 1970
Ronald Falcous, Acting Bowman – 1970
Ronald Sabiston, Mechanic - 1970
Hugh Jones Matthews, Assistant Mechanic – 1970
Hugh Ronald Matthews Jnr., crew member – 1970

Keith Stewart – 1977
Jeffrey Matthews – 1977

Matthew Stuart, Helm – 1978
Ian Matthew, crew member – 1978

Rodney Burge, Second Coxswain – 1991

- Vellum Service Certificates

Norman Rowell – 1977

- A Framed Letter of Thanks signed by the Chairman of the Institution

J. B. Sample, skin diver – 1970
E. Bramham, skin diver – 1970

John Connell, Coxswain – 2001

John Sim, Helm – 2003
Esmond Coulter, crew member – 2003
Christopher Nisbet, crew member – 2003

- Member, Order of the British Empire (MBE)

Rodney Burge, Coxswain – 1998NYH

== Amble lifeboats ==
=== Pulling and Sailing (P&S) lifeboats ===
| ON (Note: ON is the RNLI's Official Number of the boat.) | Name | Built | On station | Class | Comments |
|---|---|---|---|---|---|
| Pre-115 | Blythe | 1826 | 1843−1847 | 27-foot North Country | (Note: 27-foot x 8-foot 6in (10-oared) North Country non-self-righting lifeboat, built by Wake of Sunderland.); Previously at Blyth |
| – | Unnamed | – | 1847−1852/56 | Unknown | (Note: Provided to Warkworth Harbour Commissioners by Newcastle Shipwreck Association.) |
| Pre-254 | Warkworth | 1852 | 1856−1860 | 30-foot Self-righting (P&S) | (Note: 30-foot x 8-foot 9in (12-oared) self-righting (P&S) lifeboat, built by Teasdel of Great Yarmouth, costing £200.) |

Station closed, 1852 or 1856

=== All-weather lifeboats ===
| ON | Op. No. (Note: Op. No. is the RNLI's Operational Number of the boat carried on the hull.) | Name | Built | On station | Class | Comments |
|---|---|---|---|---|---|---|
| 659 | – | Frederick and Emma | 1921 | 1939−1950 | 45-foot Watson | Previously at Wick |
| 685 | – | J. W. Archer | 1924 | 1950−1954 | 45-foot Watson | Previously at Teesmouth. |
| 709 | – | City of Bradford II | 1929 | 1954−1957 | 45-foot 6in Watson | Previously at Humber. |
| 848 | – | Millie Walton | 1946 | 1957−1974 | 46-foot Watson | Previously at Douglas. |
| 1022 | 37-30 | Harold Salvesen | 1974 | 1974−1986 | Rother | |
| 1004 | 44-005 | Margaret Graham | 1967 | 1986−1999 | Waveney | Previously at Harwich |
| 1176 | 12-19 | The Four Boys | 1991 | 1999−2016 | Mersey | Previously at Sennen Cove |
| 1323 | 13-16 | Elizabeth and Leonard | 2016 | 2016− | Shannon | |

Pre ON numbers are unofficial numbers used by the Lifeboat Enthusiast Society to reference early lifeboats not included on the official RNLI list.

=== Inshore lifeboats ===
| Op. No. | Name | On station | Class | Comments |
|---|---|---|---|---|
| D-51 | Unnamed | 1966−1970 | D-class (RFD PB16) | |
| D-54 | Unnamed | 1970−1972 | D-class (RFD PB16) | |
| D-203 | Unnamed | 1972−1973 | D-class (RFD PB16) | |
| D-209 | Unnamed | 1974 | D-class (RFD PB16) | |
| D-203 | Unnamed | 1975−1981 | D-class (RFD PB16) | |
| D-144 | Unnamed | 1982−1984 | D-class (RFD PB16) | |
| D-234 | Unnamed | 1985−1986 | D-class (Zodiac III) | |
| D-321 | Rose Elizabeth Lawrence | 1986−1993 | D-class (EA16) | |
| D-447 | Thomas Campbell | 1993−2001 | D-class (EA16) | |
| D-569 | Rosemary Palmer | 2001−2010 | D-class (EA16) | |
| D-736 | Mildred Holcroft | 2010−2022 | D-class (IB1) | |
| D-867 | Alf and Dora Whiting | 2022− | D-class (IB1) | |

== See also ==
- List of RNLI stations
- List of former RNLI stations
- Royal National Lifeboat Institution lifeboats
