= Wick Lifeboat Station =

RNLI Lifeboat station in Caithness, Scotland

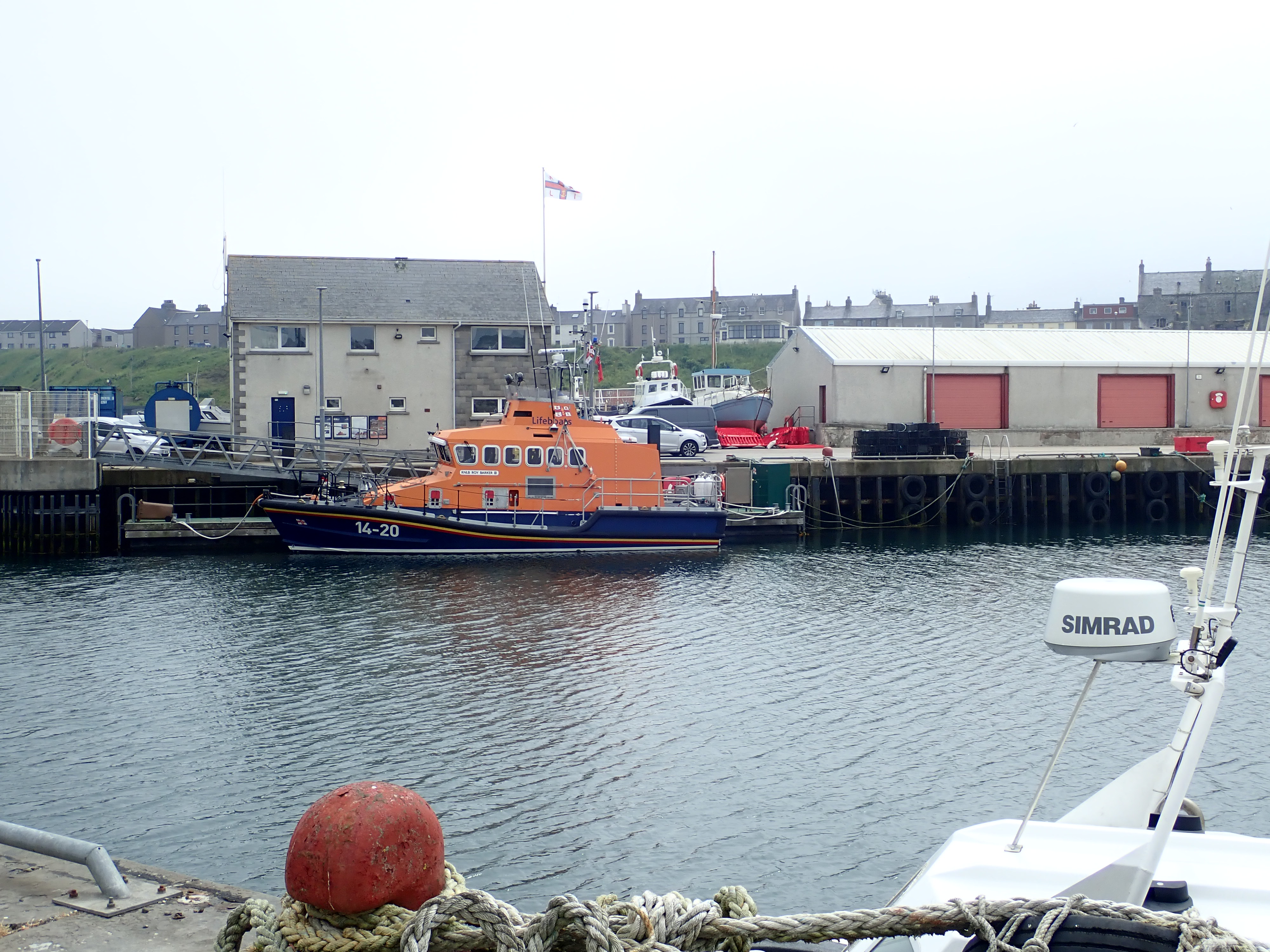
- Wick Lifeboat Station

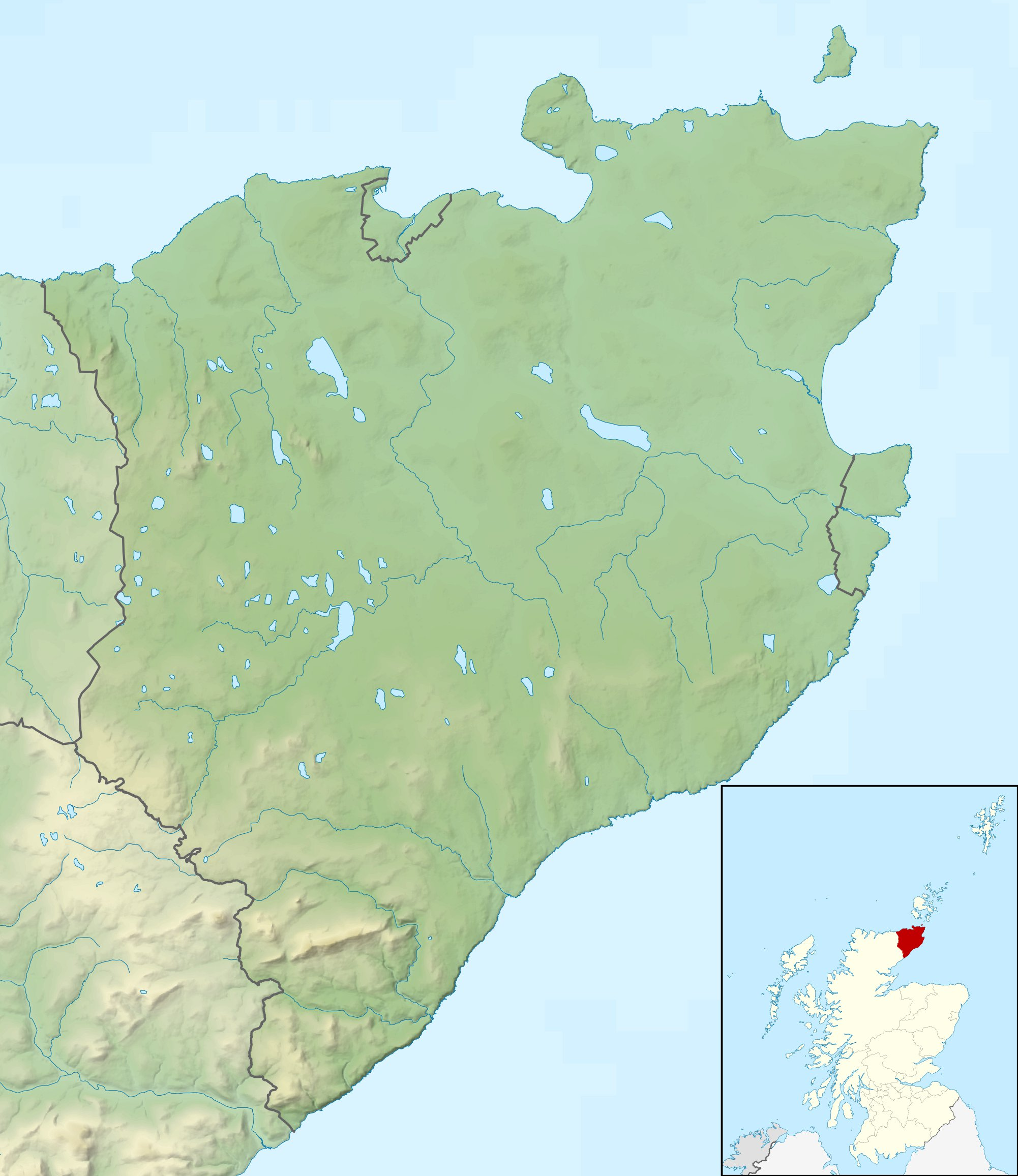
- Location within Caithness

General information
- Type: RNLI Lifeboat Station
- Location: The Lifeboat House, Fishmart, Wick Harbour, Wick, Highland, KW1 5HA, Scotland
- Coordinates: 58°26′21.6″N 3°04′58.5″W
- Opened: 1848 BFS; 1895 RNLI
- Owner: Royal National Lifeboat Institution

Website
- Wick RNLI Lifeboat Station

Wick Lifeboat Station is located at Harbour Quay in Wick, a harbour town and royal burgh in the administrative region of Highland, formerly in the historic county of Caithness, in the NE corner of Scotland.

A lifeboat was first placed at Wick by the British Fisheries Society in 1848. Management of the station was transferred to the Royal National Lifeboat Institution (RNLI) in 1895.

The station currently operates a Trent-class All-weather lifeboat, 14-20 Roy Barker II (ON 1224), on station since 1997.

== History ==
Disaster struck Wick and Caithness on what is still called "Black Saturday", the 19 August 1848. Fishing boats, which had started out in calm weather on Fri 18 August, found themselves in huge seas and a full gale on the Saturday. Ultimately, 18 vessels were wrecked, and 37 Wick fisherman lost their lives.

A lifeboat was then ordered to be placed at Wick by the British Fisheries Society (BFS), and handed to the care of the Wick and Pulteneytown Harbour Trust. She was a 28-foot 12-oar boat, thought to be built to the design of Henry Greathead, but actually built by Edward Oliver, of South Shields. Costing £169, she arrived in Wick on a steamer, on 11 November 1848.

A replacement boat would be supplied again by the BFS in 1857, and then, 12 years later, when the second boat was found to be completely useless due to dry rot, another was provided in 1870. In 1872, the BFS also funded the construction of a boathouse. In 1894, after 24 years further service, the Wick and Pulteneytown Harbour Trust realised that their boat needed replacing, but the benefactor of their boats had disappeared, the BFS having been wound up in 1893.

At a meeting of the RNLI committee of management on Thursday 8 November 1894, it was agreed that the station would be taken over by the RNLI. Hector Sutherland, Town Clerk at Wick, and Honorary Secretary of Ackergill lifeboat station, was also appointed Honorary Secretary for Wick lifeboat station, both stations being run by the same branch committee.

The RNLI immediately ordered a new boat, a 34 ft (10 m) self-righting 'Pulling and Sailing' (P&S) lifeboat, one with both sails and (10) oars, constructed by Woolfe, costing £345, which arrived in Wick on 3 December 1895. On 10 December 1895, the boat was named John Avins at a ceremony at the Rifle Drill Hall, Pulteneytown, the boat funded by the legacy of Mr J. Avins of Birmingham.

In a storm of April 1905, the boat was launched to the aid of four fishing boats in difficulties in Wick Bay. Having just cleared the harbour entrance, the John Avins was hit with a succession of large waves, and smashed against the North Quay wall. Four crew that were washed overboard were recovered to the lifeboat, but the boat was then swept up the Quay and dashed on the rocks. Fortunately all crew were brought ashore, but the boat was badly damaged and subsequently withdrawn from service. A relief lifeboat, Reserve No. 4A, formerly the Oldham (ON 335), was placed at Wick. She remaining there for the next eight years, but was never launched on service.

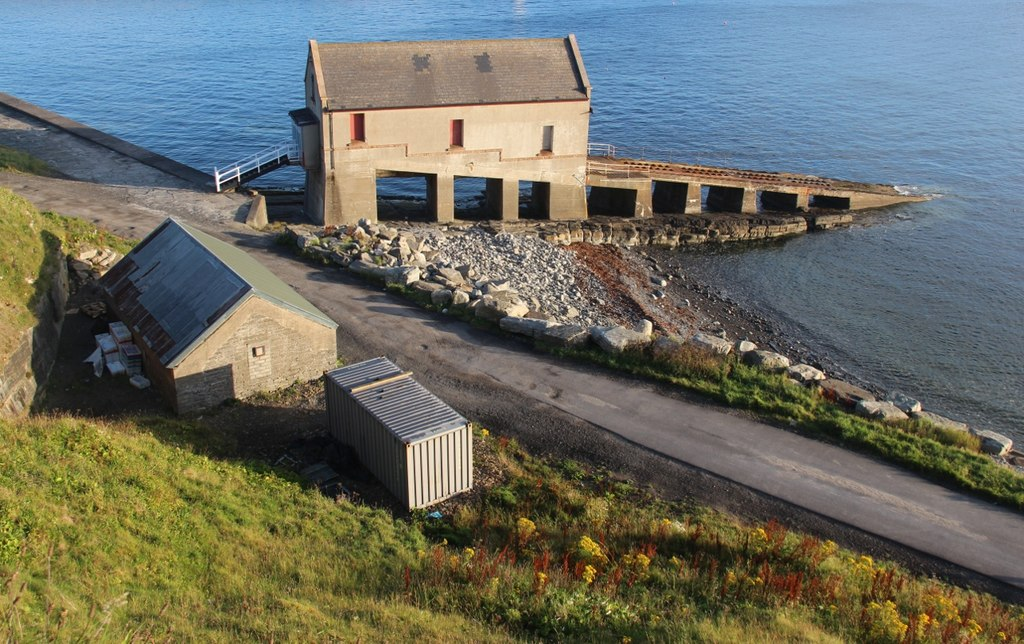
1916 Wick Lifeboat Station

In 1913, the RNLI decided to close the station temporarily, whilst a new boathouse and roller-slipway was constructed at Salmon Rock to house a new motor lifeboat. Costing £4,000, the boathouse was completed in 1916, but owing to World War I, it would be 1921 before the lifeboat was ready, and Wick would receive their first motor-powered lifeboat, the 45-foot Watson-class Frederick and Emma (ON 659).

At 02:25 on 21 September 1942, the 46-foot Watson-class lifeboat City of Edinburgh (ON 802) was launched in complete darkness and torrential rain, to the aid of the tugboat St. Olaves and the motor-barge Gold Crown, both driven ashore near John O'Groats. Sighted at dawn, 27 men were rescued from the barge, and four from the tug. Cold and exhausted, the lifeboat men revived them with rum. For this service, Coxswain Neil Stewart Jr. was awarded the RNLI Bronze Medal.

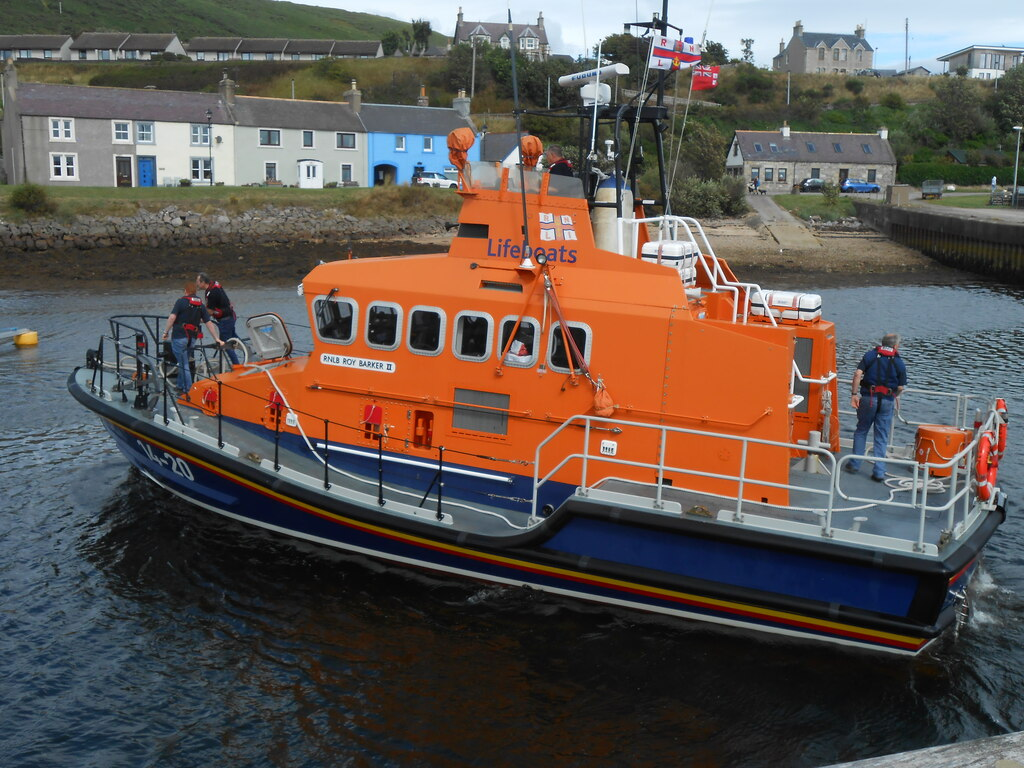
Trent-class lifeboat 14-20 Roy Barker II (ON 1224)

In 1994, the Tyne-class lifeboat 47-016 Norman Salveson (ON 1121) was placed on a mooring in the inner harbour. With the lifeboat now moored afloat, a new station building was required near to the lifeboat, providing up to date crew facilities. Work was started in January 1997 and completed in the August of the same year. On 13 February 1997, Fraserburgh received their current lifeboat, the 14-20 Roy Barker II (ON 1224). Mr Frederick Roy Barker (1909–1992), known as Roy, left his entire estate to the RNLI, known as the Roy Barker Memorial Fund, with the request that all income be used to fund lifeboats. Wick received one of three Trent-class lifeboats from the fund.

A pontoon berth was constructed in 2007 at a cost of £270,000.

After nearly 30 years on station, it was announced in 2025 that the station's long serving Trent-class lifeboat 14-20 Roy Barker II (ON 1224) would be retired in 2026, replaced by a new £2.7m state-of-the-art Shannon-class All-weather lifeboat.

Shannon-class lifeboat 13-61 Snooks Sanctuary (ON 1368) arrived at her new home of Wick on Saturday 31 October 2026, welcomed in by the lifeboats from Longhope and Thurso, along with the retiring Wick lifeboat Roy Barker II. She will formally enter service after a short period of crew training.

== Station honours ==
The following are awards made at Wick:

- RNIPLS Silver Medal
  Andrew Lake, Chief Officer, H.M. Coastguard, Wick – 1828
  Robert MacAlister – 1839
  James Wishart – 1846
  William Williamson, Branch Pilot – 1848
- RNLI Silver Medal
  Cmdr. John Tudor, RN, Agent for British Fisheries Society, Wick – 1857
- Silver Medal for Heroism awarded by The King of Norway
  Neil Stewart Jnr, Coxswain – 1956
- RNLI Bronze Medal
  Neil Stewart Jr., Coxswain – 1942
  Donald McKay, Coxswain Mechanic – 1984
- Board of Trade Bronze Medal
  Wick Lifeboat Crew – 1860
- 'The Thanks of the Institution inscribed on Vellum'
  Walter McLeod McPhee, Coxswain – 1991
  Walter McLeod McPhee, Coxswain – 1992
  Ian Alexander Cormack, Acting Second Coxswain – 1992
- Vellum Service Certificate
  John Martin, Motor Mechanic – 1992
  Alexander Durand, Assistant Mechanic – 1992
  Hugh Gunn, Assistant Winchman – 1992
- British Empire Medal
  Neil Stewart Jr., Coxswain – 1970NYH

== Roll of honour ==
In memory of those lost whilst serving at Wick:

- Lost when the Wick Harbour lifeboat capsized, on service to the Netherlands galiot Vronia Santina, 8 September 1857.

Alexander Bain

== Wick lifeboats ==
=== British Fisheries Society ===
Name	Built	On station	Class	Comments
Unnamed	1848	1848−1858	28-foot non-self-righting (P&S)	(Note: 28 ft 0 in (8.53 m) x 10 ft 3 in (3.12 m) (12-oared) non-self-righting lifeboat, funded by the British Fisheries Society, constructed by Edward Oliver of South Shields, costing £169 (P&S))
Unnamed	1858	1858−1870	34-foot Peake self-righting (P&S)	(Note: 34 ft 0 in (10.36 m) x 6 ft 6 in (1.98 m) (12-oared) Peake-class self-righting (P&S) lifeboat, funded by the British Fisheries Board, constructed by Forrestt of Limehouse, London.)
Unnamed	1870	1870−1895	34-foot self-righting (P&S)	(Note: Thought to be identical to the 1857 boat, a 34-foot (12-oared) self-righting (P&S) lifeboat, built locally for about £100.)

=== RNLI ===
==== Pulling and Sailing (P&S) lifeboats ====
ON (Note: ON is the RNLI's Official Number of the boat.)	Name	Built	On station	Class	Comments
385	John Avins	1895	1895−1905	34-foot self-righting (P&S)	(Note: 34 ft 0 in (10.36 m) x 8 ft 3 in (2.51 m) (10-oared) self-righting (P&S) lifeboat, legacy of Mr J. Avins or Worcester, England, constructed by Woolfe of Shadwell, London, costing £345.); Wrecked on service, 14 April 1905.
335	Reserve No.4A	1892	1905−1913	34-foot self-righting (P&S)	(Note: 34 ft 0 in (10.36 m) x 8 ft 0 in (2.44 m) (10-oared) self-righting (P&S) lifeboat, funded by the Oldham LB Fund, built by Forrestt of Limehouse, London, costing £419 when new.); Previously Oldham at Abersoch. Broken up in 1913.

Station closed 1913–1921

==== Motor lifeboats ====
ON	Op.No. (Note: Op. No. is the RNLI's Operational Number of the boat carried on the hull.)	Name	Built	On station	Class	Comments
659	−	Frederick and Emma	1921	1921−1938	45-foot Watson	Transferred to Amble.
802	−	City of Edinburgh	1938	1938−1968	46-foot Watson	
887	−	Sir Geoffrey Baring	1951	1968−1970	46-foot 9in Watson	Previously at Clacton-on-Sea. Transferred to the Relief fleet, later at Workington.
1016	48-13	Princess Marina	1970	1970−1988	Oakley	
1121	47-016	Norman Salveson	1988	1988−1997	Tyne	Transferred to Sennen Cove.
1224	14-20	Roy Barker II	1997	1997−	Trent	
1368	13-61	Snooks Sanctuary	2026	tbc	Shannon	

More post-service details can be found on the respective lifeboat class pages.

== See also ==
- List of RNLI stations
- List of former RNLI stations
- Royal National Lifeboat Institution lifeboats
