= Workington Lifeboat Station =

RNLI lifeboat station in Cumbria, England

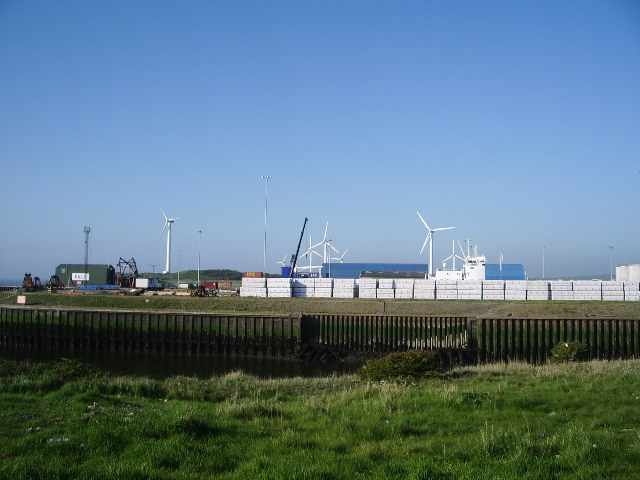
- Workington Lifeboat Station on left

- Location within Cumbria

General information
- Type: RNLI Lifeboat Station
- Location: North Jetty, Prince of Wales Dock, Workington, Cumbria, CA14 2JH, England
- Coordinates: 54°39′03.2″N 3°34′03.5″W
- Opened: 1886–1905; 1948–present
- Owner: Royal National Lifeboat Institution

Website
- Workington RNLI Lifeboat Station

Workington Lifeboat Station is located at the North Jetty, on the Prince of Wales Dock, in the port of Workington, on the west coast of Cumbria.

A lifeboat was first stationed at Workington by the Royal National Lifeboat Institution (RNLI) in 1886.

The station currently operates a davit launched Shannon-class All-weather lifeboat, 13-19 Dorothy May White (ON 1326), on station since 2017, and a D-class (IB1) Inshore lifeboat, James R Allen (D-901), on station since 2025.

== History ==
At daybreak on Saturday 19 September 1885, just the top portion of a ship's mast was spotted above the water, off Mossbay Point, between Harrington and Workington. The crew had taken to the rigging when the vessel was wrecked. The one remaining survivor was soon seen to be washed away. The tug Derwent put out from Workington, towing a harbour boat with four men aboard, but the boat capsized, and one man, Alexander Donnon, was also lost. The vessel was the schooner Margaret of Ramsey, Isle of Man. The bodies of the two crew, William Cowle and William Kennish, and the Master, Robert Christian, were found washed up on the beach. James Henry Christian, aged 13, the Master's son, was found later.

It was following this wreck and loss of life, that requests were made to the RNLI for the provision of a lifeboat at Workington, which was agreed. A lifeboat house and slipway were constructed at a cost of £395.

The lifeboat, a 34 ft (10 m) self-righting 'pulling and sailing' (P&S) lifeboat, one with oars and sails, was pulled on its carriage, drawn by eight horses, through the town in a grand procession. At a ceremony at the shore, south of the pier, the lifeboat was named the Dodo (ON 79) in accordance with the wishes of the donor, the late Miss Harrison of London. Accepted by the District Inspector of Life-boats, Lt. Tipping, RN, the boat was handed over to the care of the local RNLI committee.

In 1891, the lifeboat house was relocated to the beach south of John's Pier. A replacement boat was placed on service in 1899, unusually, being older than the first boat, although of identical design and size. Previously named Theodore and Herbert (ON 33) at Southend-on-Sea, the boat was renamed Dodo at Workington. In 1902, the boat returned to its original name. Three years later, it is believed that works on the piers at Workington forced the closure of the lifeboat station in 1905.

By 1948, the nearest lifeboat station at Maryport was beginning to suffer from silting of the harbour. In order to maintain a lifeboat service on the Solway coast, the Workington station was re-established. Maryport Lifeboat Station closed in 1949. In what would be her last assignment, already now 26-years-old, a 45-foot Watson-class non-self-righting lifeboat named The Brothers (ON 671) was placed at Workington, serving for four years until her retirement. She was replaced in February 1952 for just one year, by the former Barrow lifeboat, a slightly larger 45-foot 6in Watson non-self-righting lifeboat, named N. T. (ON 701), which was already 25-years-old when she arrived at Workington. The requested names of the donors, Eliza Norman and M. E. Thompson, were inscribed on a plaque inside the boat.

In March 1953, Workington received the Manchester and Salford XXIX (ON 841), a 10-year-old 46-foot Watson-class non-self-righting lifeboat, which had previously served at Pwllheli.

At 21:25 on the 27 January 1974, the relief lifeboat City of Edinburgh (ON 802) was launched in extremely rough conditions, to the fishing vessel Kia Ora, broken down off Hestan Island, in Auchencairn Bay, and dragging her anchor. In the very poor conditions, the lifeboat was brought alongside, and at the second attempt, six men and a 10-year-old boy were recovered. Coxswain Albert Brown was awarded the RNLI Bronze Medal, the first and only such award for gallantry at Workington.

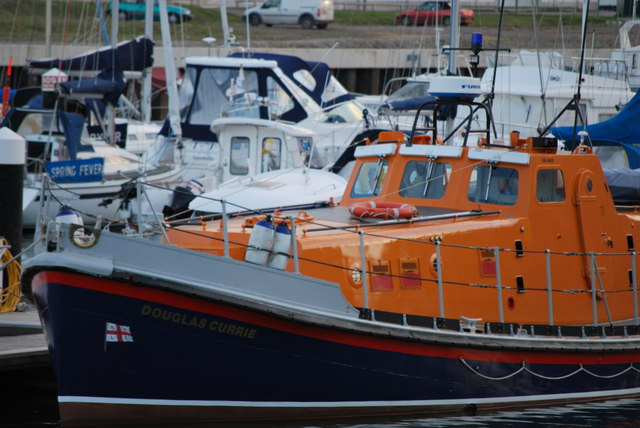
RNLB Douglas Currie (ON 1021)

In 1990, the Solent lifeboat Douglas Currie (ON 1021) was placed on service for two years. The lifeboat was 17-years-old at this time, having previously served at four other lifeboat stations in Scotland. At the same time, a relatively new two-year-old carriage-launched Mersey-class lifeboat from the relief fleet was placed at Workington, on trial from 4 July 1990 until 3 January 1991, to evaluate shore launches and recovery.

Shore launching was clearly not suited to the geography at Workington. On 8 June 1992, the station would receive a Tyne-class lifeboat from the relief fleet, 47-028 Sir John Fisher (ON 1141), funded by a gift from the Sir John Fisher Foundation, and the bequests of Frances Elizabeth Jackson and Mabel Annie Young. To accommodate the boat, a new boathouse was constructed on the quay at the Prince of Wales Dock, with a workshop, drying room, shower/toilet facilities, a fuel storage tank and crew-room. In a unique method of launching an All-weather lifeboat in the UK, the boat is set on a rail carriage in the boathouse. At time of launch, the boat is rolled out of the boathouse, and then a special launch davit system picks up the boat, which is first lifted, and then lowered into the water.

At a coastal review in 2004, it was decided to also place an Inshore lifeboat at Workington. Following a brief period with the relief lifeboat Spirit of RAOC (D-461), the D-class (IB1) lifeboat The Shannock (D-629) was placed on service on 12 August 2004.

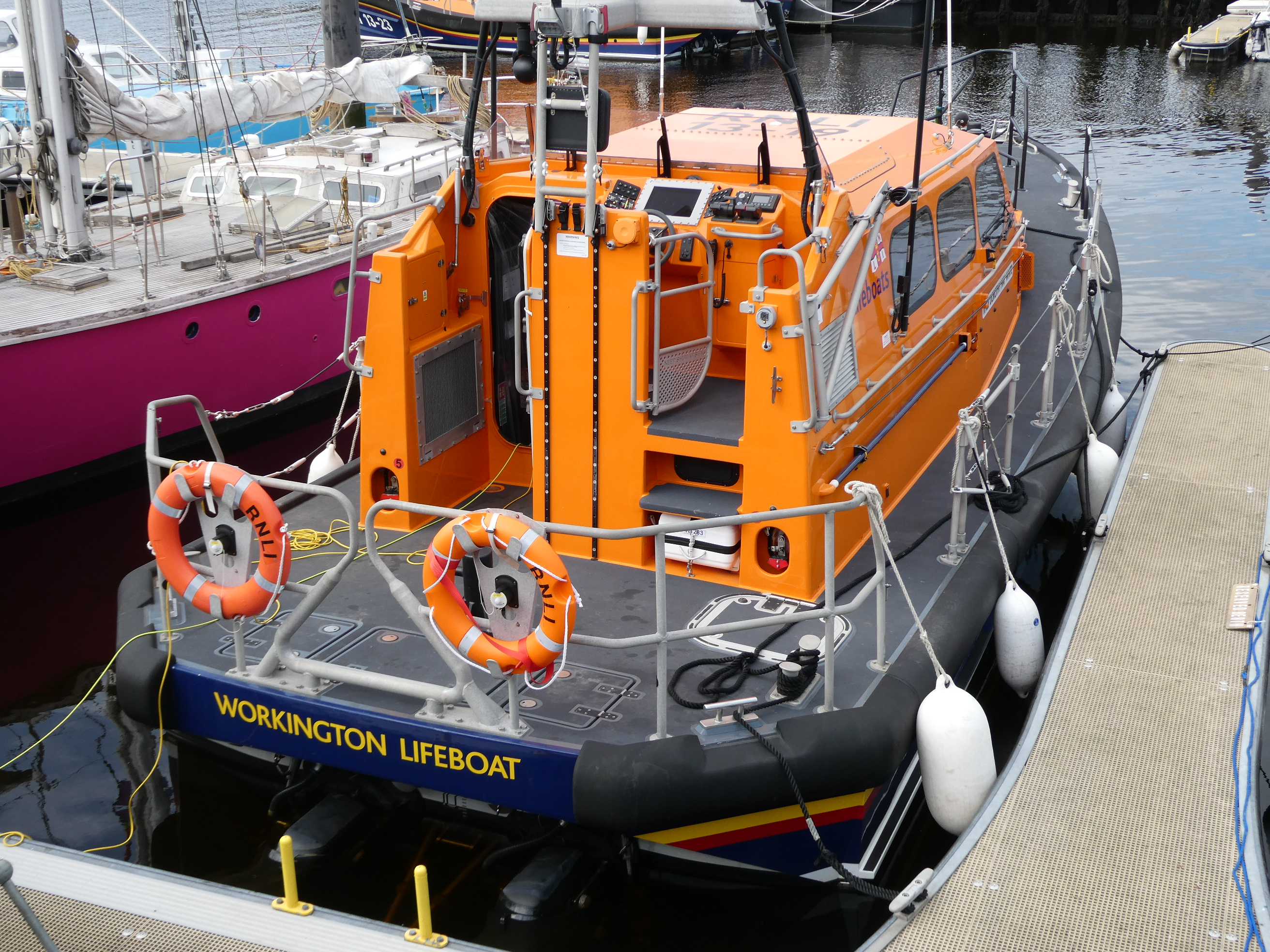
Shannon-class lifeboat 13-19 Dorothy May White (ON 1326)

On 7 December 2011, the fishing vessel George Lou-N suffered engine problems, and was being smashed against the North Pier, in very rough conditions and a force 10 gale, and with a severely injured man on board. At great personal risk, RNLI divisional maintenance manager Andrew Philip Rodgers jumped onto the vessel from the Pier to assist, and the lifeboat Sir John Fisher (ON 1141) managed to get a tow established. The vessel was brought into the harbour without damage, and the man's life was saved. Coxswain John Stobbart and Mr Rodgers were both accorded the 'Thanks of the Institution inscribed on Vellum'.

In 2017, Workington would receive a new £2.2 million Shannon-class lifeboat. Named 13-19 Dorothy May White (ON 1326), it would be the first brand new lifeboat assigned to the station for 131 years, since the very first boat, Dodo (ON 79), in 1886. The boat was funded primarily by the legacy of £1million from the late Dorothy May White, a long-time RNLI supporter. A further £500,000 was provided from the Sir John Fisher Foundation.

Tributes were paid to one of the founding members of the St Bees lifeboat, Robert 'Bob' McLaughlin, of Whitehaven, Cumbria, who died in October 2024, aged 89. McLaughlin had previously served as Senior Helm on the St Bees Inshore lifeboat, and was awarded the British Empire Medal in the 1990 Birthday Honours. He became operations manager at Workington in 1995, later becoming life president of the Whitehaven branch of the RNLI. In 2022, he celebrated 60 years with the Institution.

At a ceremony in February 2025, 24 members of the Workington lifeboat crew, all with over five years frontline service, were awarded the King Charles III Coronation Medal by Alexander Scott, Lord Lieutenant of Cumbria.

== Station honours ==
The following are awards made at Workington:

- RNLI Bronze Medal
  Albert Brown, Coxswain – 1974
- 'The Thanks of the Institution inscribed on Vellum'
  John Stobbart, Coxswain – 2001
  John Stobbart, Coxswain – 2012
  Andrew Philip Rodgers, Divisional Maintenance Manager – 2012
- British Empire Medal
  John Stobbart, Coxswain – 2020QBH

== Roll of honour ==
In memory of those lost whilst serving at Workington:

- Lost while attempting the rescue of the crew of the Margaret of Ramsey, 19 September 1885
  Alexander Donnon, crew member (36)

== Workington lifeboats ==
=== Pulling and Sailing (P&S) lifeboats ===
ON (Note: ON is the RNLI's Official Number of the boat.)	Name	Built	On station	Class	Comments
79	Dodo	1886	1886−1899	34-foot self-righting (P&S)	(Note: 34 ft 0 in (10.36 m) x 7 ft 6 in (2.29 m) (10-oared) self-righting (P&S) lifeboat, legacy of Miss Harrison, built by Woolfe of Shadwell, London, costing £293.); Sold in 1899
33	Dodo	1885	1899−1902	34-foot self-righting (P&S)	(Note: 34 ft 0 in (10.36 m) x 7 ft 6 in (2.29 m) (10-oared) self-righting (P&S) lifeboat, funded from the legacy of Miss Harrison, built by Woolfe of Shadwell, London, costing £300 when new.); Previously Theodore and Herbert at Southend-on-Sea, and reverted to that name in Nov 1902.
33	Theodore and Herbert	1885	1902−1905	34-foot self-righting (P&S)	(Note: Legacy of Mrs F. S. Smith of Lisheen, County Cork.); Broken up in 1906.

Station closed in 1905

=== Motor lifeboats ===
ON	Op.No. (Note: Op. No. is the RNLI's Operational Number of the boat carried on the hull.)	Name	Built	On station	Class	Comments
671	−	The Brothers	1922	1948−1952	45-foot Watson	First deployed at Penlee.
701	−	N. T.	1927	1952−1953	45-foot 6in Watson	Previously at Barrow.
841	−	Manchester and Salford XXIX	1943	1953−1972	46-foot Watson	Previously at Pwllheli.
887	–	Sir Godfrey Baring	1951	1972−1982	46-foot 9in Watson	Previously at Clacton-on-Sea and Wick
951	–	Francis W. Wotherspoon of Paisley	1959	1982−1986	47-foot Watson	Previously at Islay and Fishguard.
940	–	Pentland (Civil Service No.31)	1957	1986−1990	47-foot Watson	Previously at Thurso and The Mumbles
1021	48-016	Douglas Currie	1973	1990−1992	Solent	First deployed in the Relief fleet.
1141	47-028	Sir John Fisher	1989	1992−2017	Tyne	Previously in the Relief fleet.
1326	13-19	Dorothy May White	2017	2017−	Shannon	

More post-service details can be found on the respective lifeboat class pages.

==== Workington No.2 lifeboat ====
ON	Op.No.	Name	Built	On station	Class	Comments
1148	12-11	Lifetime Care	1988	1990−1991	Mersey	Launch Trials

=== Inshore lifeboats ===
Op.No.	Name	On station	Class	Comments
D-461	Spirit of RAOC	2004	D-class (EA16)	
D-629	The Shannock	2004–2014	D-class (IB1)	
D-564	Peter Bond	2009–2010	D-class (EA16)	
D-767	John F. Mortimer	2014–2025	D-class (IB1)	
D-901	James R Allen	2025–	D-class (IB1)	

=== Launch and recovery tractors ===
Op.No.	Reg. No.	Type	On station	Comments
T91	UAW 558Y	Talus MB-H Crawler	1990–1991	Mersey launch trials

== See also ==
- List of RNLI stations
- List of former RNLI stations
- Royal National Lifeboat Institution lifeboats
