= Blyth Lifeboat Station =

RNLI Lifeboat station in Northumberland, England

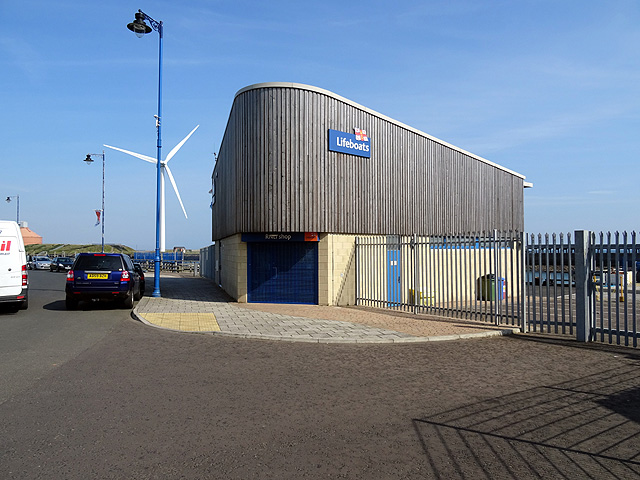
- Blyth Lifeboat Station

- Location within Northumberland

General information
- Type: RNLI Lifeboat Station
- Location: Blyth Lifeboat Station, Quay Road, South Harbour,, Blyth, Northumberland, NE24 3PA, UK
- Coordinates: 55.125491°N 1.497928°W
- Opened: 1808
- Owner: Royal National Lifeboat Institution

Website
- Blyth RNLI Lifeboat Station

Blyth Lifeboat Station is located on Quay Road, in the Port and seaside town of Blyth, in the south east corner of the county of Northumberland, approx. 13 miles (21 km) north of Newcastle upon Tyne.

A lifeboat was first stationed at Blyth by the Ridley Estate Trust in 1808, but operated for only two years. Following subsequent management by both the Royal National Institution for the Preservation of Life from Shipwreck (RNIPLS), and the Blyth Lifeboat Association (BLA), the station was finally transferred to the Royal National Lifeboat Institution (RNLI) in 1866.

The station currently operates two Inshore lifeboats, the B-class (Atlantic 85) lifeboat Patricia Southall (B-923), on station since 2021, and the smaller D-class (IB1) Sally Forth (D-878), since 2023.

== History ==
A lifeboat had first been based at Blyth in 1808, privately sponsored by Sir Matthew Ridley. On its first service to a number of Cullercoats fishing boats, caught in a sudden storm off St Mary's island in 1810, the lifeboat was wrecked. 15 lifeboatmen lost their lives. The lifeboat was not replaced.

The Port of Newcastle Shipwreck Association (NSA) would fund a new Blyth lifeboat in 1826, which was managed and operated by the recently formed RNIPLS. This boat was also to suffer tragedy, capsizing just out of the harbour on 28 October 1841. 10 lifeboatmen lost their lives. Crewman Henry Kinch, a very strong swimmer, and one of only two survivors, was awarded the RNLI Silver Medal for his efforts to save the crew. The boat was recovered, but transferred to Amble in 1843, and not immediately replaced.

In 1845, the Port of Newcastle Shipwreck Association ordered a new lifeboat from Oliver of South Shields, a 32-foot 12-oared non-self-righting lifeboat, costing £175. It would be managed by the Blyth Lifeboat Association, who levied a toll on all ships entering Blyth to pay for its upkeep.

On 27 October 1852, the Blyth lifeboat launched to the Russian barque Victoria, wrecked near Blyth Harbour. All 14 crew were saved. H.M. Coastguard James Kearney White was awarded the RNLI Silver Clasp to his medal, his second Silver award.

In certain weather conditions, it was found difficult to getting the lifeboat out of the harbour. To resolve this, Blyth No.2 station was established in 1854, located 1 mile north of Blyth Harbour on Cambois Links. Sir Matthew Ridley would provide a site, and the funds for a boathouse. A 31-foot 12-oared lifeboat was constructed by George Redhead of Blyth. In 1870, the previously unnamed lifeboat would be named Thomas Carr.

On 1 December 1866, management of the station was transferred to the RNLI. The No.1 boathouse was renovated and lengthened, and the 20–year old lifeboat was replaced with a new 33-foot Self-righting boat, built by Woolfe of Shadwell, costing £283. A new carriage was provided for the boat, costing a further £98, and at a ceremony on 4 May 1867, the new boat was named Salford, having been provided by funds raised by the Manchester and Salford branch of the RNLI.

On service to the Norwegian vessel Fremad on 16 October 1898, the No.2 Lifeboat Oswald, Sarah & Jane (ON 250) capsized. Some lifeboat men made it ashore, and others regained the boat, but Second Coxswain Mark Fairhurst was swept away. Coxswain John William Tinning jumped back into the sea, and managed to pull Fairhurst ashore, but he didn't survive.

Tinning was awarded the RNLI Silver Medal, and a Silver Medal from the Norwegian Government for his courageous actions. He would later be killed in action, in the Second Boer War, on 21 July 1900.

Blyth No.2 station was renamed Cambois Lifeboat Station on 8 March 1900. In the same year, a new lifeboat would be placed at Cambois, the 34-foot John Anthony (ON 447). Cambois Coxswain John Bushell and Acting Bowman G. Summerside would be awarded gallantry medals from the King of Norway, for their service to the barque Haabet of Svelvik on 12 November 1901. On the 9 October 1921, a motor-powered 45-foot Watson lifeboat Joseph Adlam (ON 654) would be placed at Blyth. Cambois Lifeboat Station was closed on 30 June 1927.

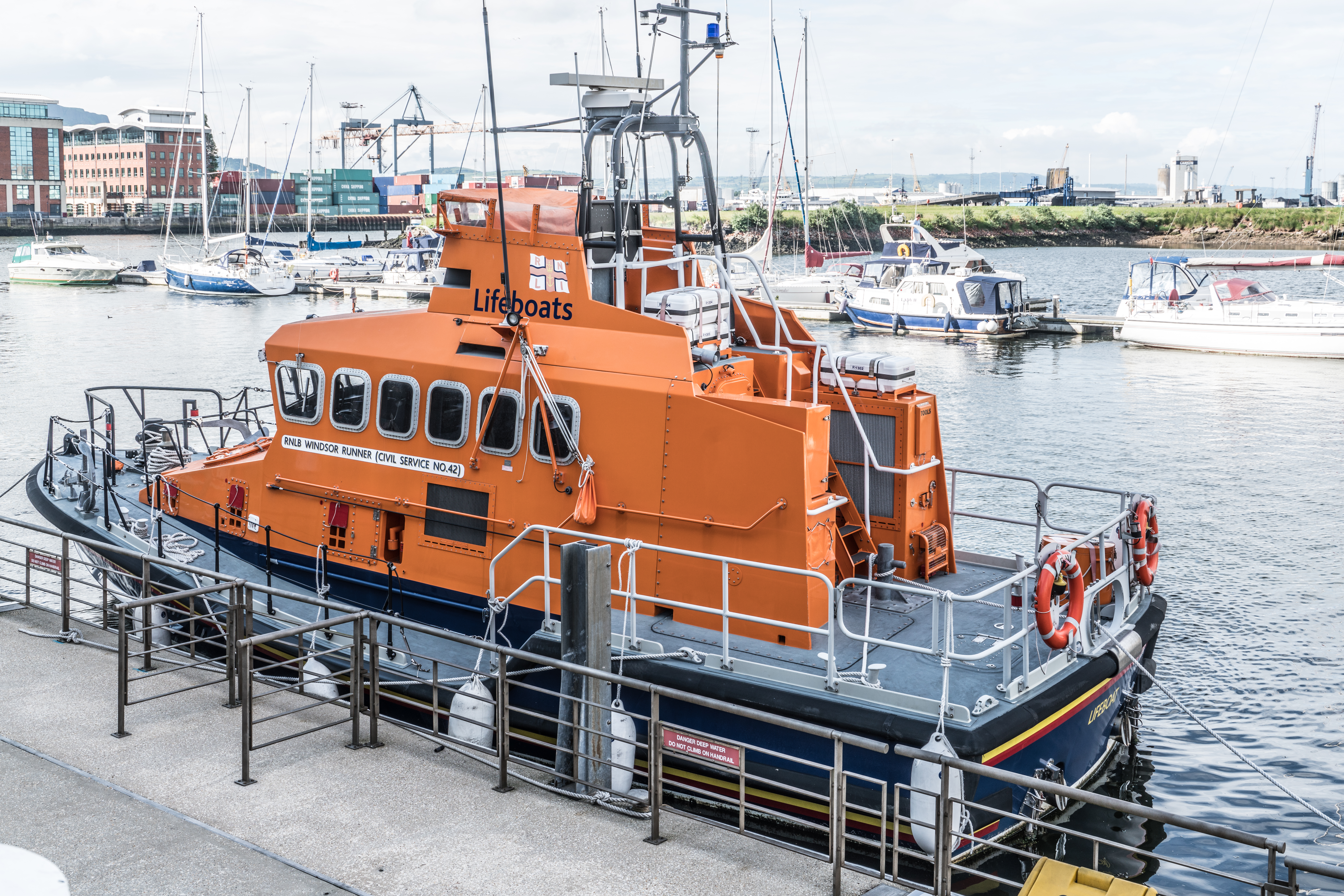
Trent-class lifeboat 14-06 Windsor Runner (ON 1204)

In 1921, for the station's first motor lifeboat, the RNLI built a new boathouse and roller-slipway. The various motor lifeboats over the years were slipway launched until October 1982, when a Waveney-class fast afloat boat was allocated to the station.

The Waveney served until replaced by the new 25-knot Trent-class lifeboat 14-06 Windsor Runner (ON 1204) in December 1995. (Unusually for the RNLI, all of Blyth's motor lifeboats had been built new for the station).

However, a review of lifeboat provision in the North East led to the decision to withdraw the All-weather lifeboat from Blyth, and the station became an Inshore Lifeboat Station on 16 July 2004.

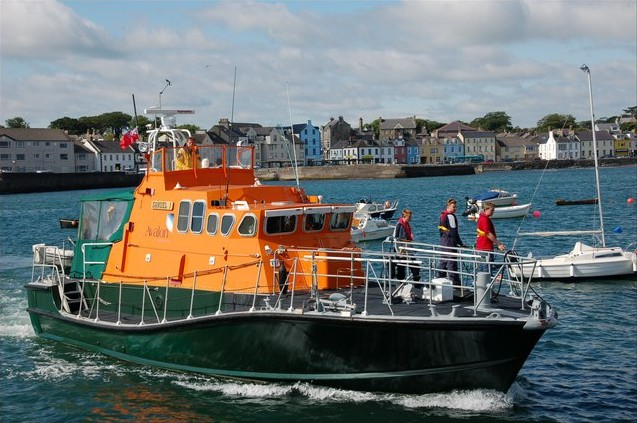
Arun-class Lifeboat Samuel J

Inevitably, decisions to close or downgrade stations often lead to local concerns, and following the RNLI decision, the independent "Blyth Volunteer Lifeboat Service" (BVLS) was established. With the help of a loan from a local man, a 38-foot-6-inch Lochin Marine lifeboat was purchased, constructed in 1990 for the Caister Volunteer Lifeboat Service (CVLS), (another independent lifeboat service, similarly set up after withdrawal of their RNLI All-weather lifeboat). At a ceremony on Sunday 22 March 2005, the boat was named Spirit of Blyth and Wansbeck.

In 2014, the service acquired the former St Peter Port gold-medal winning lifeboat 52-02 Sir William Arnold (ON 1025), by then in private hands and known as Samuel J. The boat was in service at Blyth until operations ceased in 2019, and the boat was sold. Blyth Volunteer Lifeboat Service formally ceased in 2021.

In 2023, three members of crew of the RNLI D-class (IB1) Inshore lifeboat had to be rescued, when they were washed overboard during search operations in Seaton Sluice harbour. The crew activated their Emergency position-indicating radiobeacon and fired a distress flare, and were soon rescued. Their boat was recovered by Tynemouth lifeboat.

== Station honours ==
The following are awards made at Blyth

- Bronze Medal for gallantry in saving life at sea

Anthony Nixon, Coxswain – 1913

- RNIPLS Silver Medal

William Armstrong, Pilot – 1829

Henry Kinch, lifeboat crew member – 1841

James Kearney White, Chief Officer, H.M. Coastguard – 1852

James Kearney White, Chief Officer, H.M. Coastguard – 1852 (Second-Service Clasp)

- RNLI Silver Medal

John William Tinning, Coxswain (No. 2) – 1898

Anthony Nixon, Coxswain (Cambois) – 1913

John Bushell, Coxswain – 1916

Thomas Fawcus, Coxswain – 1963

- Silver Medal, awarded by the Norwegian Government

John William Tinning, Coxswain – 1898

- RNLI Bronze Medal

Josiah Wheatley, Coxswain – 1939

John Kerr, Bowman – 1963

Charles Hatcher, Coxswain – 1983

- The Maud Smith Award 1962
  (for the bravest act of lifesaving during the year by a member of a lifeboat crew)

John Kerr, Bowman – 1963

- The Thanks of the Institution inscribed on Vellum

John Bushell, Coxswain – 1916

Thomas Fawcus, Coxswain – 1959

to the other members of the crew – 1963

Keith Barnard, Coxswain – 1994

- Lifesaving Medals, awarded by The King of Norway

John Bushell, Coxswain – 1902
G. Summerside, Acting Bowman – 1902

- Silver cup, awarded by The King of Norway

Coxswain – 1917

- Silver Medals awarded by The King of Norway

to each of the crew for their services – 1917

- Member, Order of the British Empire (MBE)

Dr Reginald Carr – 2016

== Roll of honour ==
In memory of those lost whilst serving Blyth lifeboat.

- On service to Cullercoats Fishing Boats, 31 March 1810

Henry Short, Coxswain
Duncan Stewart
John Hall
Thomas Turnbull
John Doble
William Oliver
William Todd
Joseph Partis
Matthew Jefferson
Josiah Walker
Thomas Brown
John Robinson
George Lee
James Morgan
William Hunter

- Lifeboat Blythe, launched to the brig Sibsons, capsized on 28 October 1841

Robinson Byrn, Coxswain
Henry Bebord
William Dixson
James White
Daniel Dawson
John Hudson
Peter Bushell
George Heron
Edward Wood
John Hepbell

- Oswald, Sarah & Jane (ON 250) capsized on service to the Norwegian vessel Fremad, 16 October 1898.

Mark Alfred Fairhurst, Second Coxswain (40)

== Blyth lifeboats ==
=== Blyth (No.1) ===
==== Pulling and Sailing lifeboats ====
ON (Note: ON is the RNLI's Official Number of the boat.)	Name	Built	On station	Class	Launches/ Saved	Comments
–	Unnamed	1808	1808–1810	30-foot Greathead	1/0	(Note: 30-foot (10-oared) non-self-righting Greathead, funded by Sir Matthew Ridley & Lloyd's, built by Henry Greathead of South Shields.); Wrecked 31 March 1810.
Pre-115	Blythe	1826	1826–1842	29-foot North Country	?/11?	(Note: 27-foot x 8-foot 6in (10-oared) North Country non-self-righting lifeboat, funded by the RNIPLS, built by Wake of Sunderland.)
Pre-215	Blyth	1845	1845–1867	32-foot North Country	?/20?	(Note: 32-foot x 10-foot 9in (12-oared) North Country non-self-righting lifeboat, funded from Harbour Dues, built by Oliver of South Shields, costing £175.)
Pre-483	Salford	1867	1867–1886	33-foot Self-righting (P&S)	10/45	(Note: 33-foot x 8-foot 1in (10-oared) self-righting (P&S) lifeboat, funded by the Manchester Branch (RNLI), built by Woolfe of Shadwell, London, costing £283.)
4	Dalmer	1885	1886–1901	34-foot 1in Self-righting (P&S)	9/59	(Note: 34-foot x 8-foot (10-oared) self-righting (P&S) lifeboat, legacy of Mrs A. Dalmer of Ryde, built by Forrestt of Limehouse, London, costing £359.)
501	Dash	1902	1902–1921	35-foot Self-righting (P&S)	14/57	(Note: 35-foot x 8-foot 3in (10-oared) self-righting (P&S) lifeboat, legacy of Miss M. A. Parke of London, built by Thames Ironworks of Blackwall, London, costing £822.)

Pre ON numbers are unofficial numbers used by the Lifeboat Enthusiast Society to reference early lifeboats not included on the official RNLI list.

==== Motor lifeboats ====
ON	Op. No. (Note: Op. No. is the RNLI's Operational Number of the boat carried on the hull.)	Name	Built	On station	Class	Launches/ Saved	Comments
654	–	Joseph Adlam	1921	1921–1948	45-foot Watson	82/74	
853	–	Winston Churchill (Civil Service No.8)	1947	1948–1979	46-foot 9in Watson	68/39	
1054	37-36	Shoreline	1979	1979–1982	Rother	12/1	
1079	44-022	The William and Jane	1982	1982–1995	Waveney	136/43	Last Waveney built
1204	14-06	Windsor Runner (Civil Service No.42)	1995	1995–2004	Trent	95/15	

All-weather lifeboat withdrawn, 2004

=== Blyth (No.2) Cambois ===
==== Pulling and Sailing lifeboats ====
ON	Name	Built	On station	Class	Launches/ Saved	Comments
Pre-270	Unnamed	1853	1854–1870	31-foot Peake Self-righting (P&S)	0/0	(Note: 31-foot x 8-foot (12-oared) Peake-class self-righting (P&S) lifeboat, funded by the Blyth LB Assoc, built by George Redhead of Blyth.); Named Thomas Carr in 1870.
Pre-270	Thomas Carr	1853	1870–1880	31-foot Peake Self-righting (P&S)	0/0	
Pre-645	Tom and Marion	1879	1880–1889	30-foot Prowse Self-righting (P&S)	1/8	(Note: 30-foot x 8-foot (8-oared) Montrose-class (Prowse) self-righting (P&S) lifeboat, gift of Mr & Mrs Thomas Jones-Gibb of Tunbridge Wells, built by Woolfe of Shadwell, London, costing £275.)
250	Oswald, Sarah & Jane	1889	1889–1900	31-foot Self-righting (P&S)	7/5	(Note: 31-foot x 7-foot 3in (10-oared) self-righting (P&S) lifeboat, gift of Mrs Stoker of Beverley, built by Forrestt of Limehouse, London, costing £301.)
447	John Anthony	1900	1900–1927	34-foot Rubie Self-righting (P&S)	13/35	(Note: 34-foot x 8-foot (10-oared) Dungeness-class (Rubie) self-righting (P&S) lifeboat, legacy of Dr. J. Anthony of Edgbaston, built by Thames Ironworks of Blackwall, London, costing £661.)

Station Closed, 1927

=== Blyth Volunteer Lifeboat Service (BVLS) ===
Name	Built	On station	Class	Comments
Spirit of Blyth and Wansbeck	1991	2005–2014	38-foot Lochin Marine	Formerly 38-01 Bernard Matthews at Caister Volunteer Lifeboat Service
Samuel J	1973	2014–2019	52-foot Arun	Formerly 52-02 Sir William Arnold at St Peter Port

Operations of BVLS ceased, 2019

=== Inshore lifeboats ===
==== D-class ====
Op. No.	Name	On station	Class	Comments
D-51	Unnamed	1965	D-class (RFD PB16)	
D-53	Unnamed	1966–1973	D-class (RFD PB16)	
D-210	Unnamed	1973–1986	D-class (RFD PB16)	
D-324	BBC Radio Newcastle II	1987–1994	D-class (EA16)	Second of two boats funded by the Lifesaver Appeal on BBC Radio Newcastle in 1986
D-464	Wren	1994–2003	D-class (EA16)	
D-606	Jennie B	2003–2012	D-class (IB1)	
D-746	Alan and Amy	2012–2023	D-class (IB1)	
D-878	Sally Forth	2023–	D-class (IB1)	

==== B-class ====
Op. No.	Name	On station	Class	Comments
B-796	Miss Sally Anne (Baggy)	2019	B-class (Atlantic 75)	
B-789	Sure and Steadfast	2019–2021	B-class (Atlantic 75)	
B-923	Patricia Southall	2021–	B-class (Atlantic 85)	

== See also ==
- List of RNLI stations
- List of former RNLI stations
- Royal National Lifeboat Institution lifeboats
