= Sennen Cove Lifeboat Station =

RNLI lifeboat station in Cornwall, England

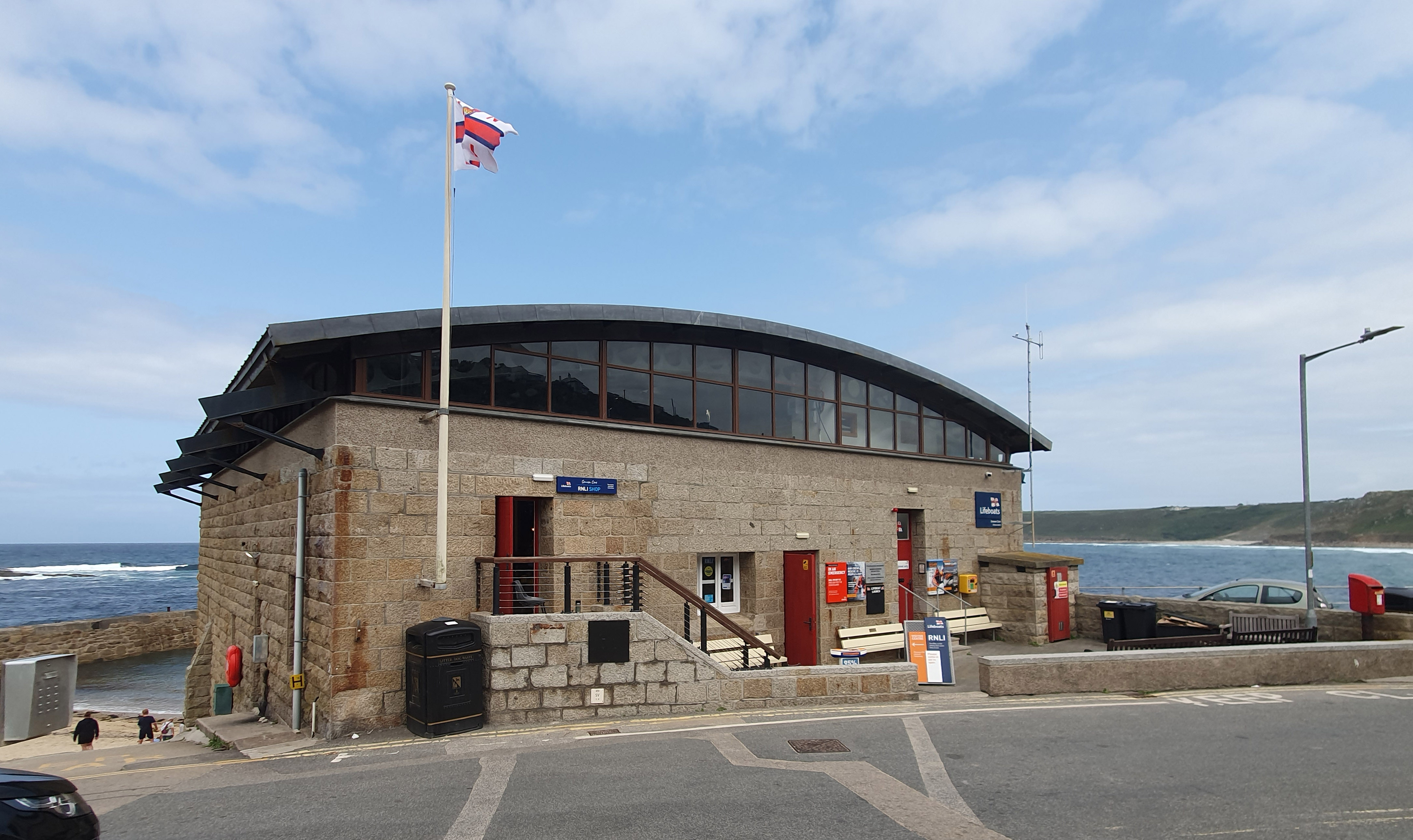
- Sennen Cove Lifeboat Station in 2025

- Location within Cornwall

General information
- Type: RNLI Lifeboat Station
- Location: The Lifeboat Station, Sennen Cove, Cornwall, TR19 7DF, United Kingdom
- Coordinates: 50.077933°N 5.703734°W
- Opened: 1853
- Owner: Royal National Lifeboat Institution

Website
- Sennen Cove RNLI Lifeboat Station

Sennen Cove Lifeboat Station can be found at the western end of Sennen Cove, a small coastal village, approximately 1 mile (1.6 km) north of Land's End, sitting at the tip of the Penwith peninsula, on the north-west coast of the county of Cornwall, England.

A lifeboat station was established at Sennen Cove by the Royal National Institution for the Preservation of Life from Shipwreck (RNIPLS) in 1853.

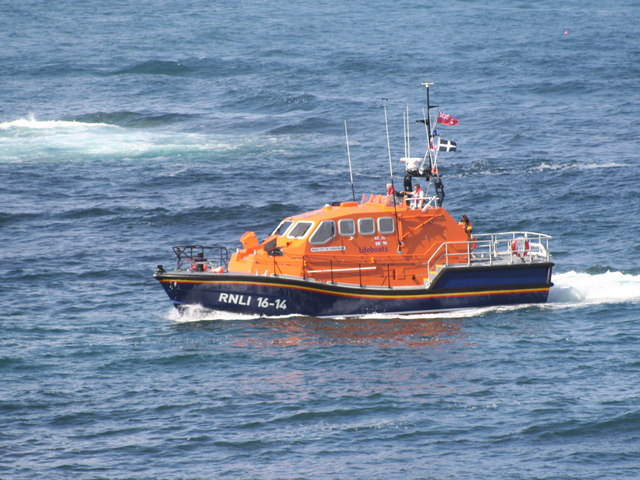
Tamar-class lifeboat 16-14 City of London III (ON 1294)

The station currently operates a Tamar-class All-weather lifeboat, 16-14 City of London III (ON 1294), on station since 2010, and the much smaller D-class (IB1) Inshore lifeboat, Arangy (D-896), on station since 2024.

== History ==
Sennen Cove is situated just to the north of Land's End, the most westerly point in mainland England. In thick fog and rough seas on the morning of 11 January 1851, the 250 ton brig New Commercial of Whitby struck the Brisons, a group of rocks to the north of Sennen Cove. The vessel, on passage from Liverpool to the Spanish Main, broke up immediately. The nine men aboard, and the Captain's wife, managed to scramble onto the rocks, but at 09:00, a huge wave swept eight men away, seven to their deaths. A group of five fishermen from Sennen put out in their boat Grace, and found the eighth man, Isaac Williams, a man of mixed race, at the time referred to as a Mulatto, clinging to wreckage. The Revenue Cutter Sylvia was launched from Penzance, and after their brave efforts over two days, managed to retrieve both the Captain and his wife, although she succumbed to the effects of exposure soon afterwards. (Taken from the report of witness Rev. Gregory of Mullion via the Royal Cornwall Gazette of 17 January 1851).

Two gold medals and 10 silver medals for gallantry were awarded by the RNIPLS, to the members of HM Coastguard and the Revenue Cutter.

In 1851, an embargo was placed on the construction of all new lifeboats, pending the outcome of the The Duke of Northumberland's Prize competition, for the best lifeboat design. However, the Admiralty requested a lifeboat for H.M. Dockyard, Woolwich. Tests of the Admiralty boat at Brighton on 3 February 1852 proved successful, and in view of the events of 1851, a lifeboat was ordered for Sennen from Wallis of Blackwall, London. The Wallis lifeboat failed tests, and was immediately condemned without ever making it to Cornwall. A Peake-class lifeboat was subsequently built for Sennen Cove by Forrest of Limehouse in 1853.

Having successfully completed harbour trials, the new 25-foot-long (7.6 m) Peake-class self-righting 'Pulling and Sailing' (P&S) lifeboat, one with sails and six oars, was transported to Penzance free of charge by the British and Irish Steam Packet Company, from where she was towed to Sennen Cove by the Revenue Cutter, arriving in July 1853. At his own expense, Mr James Trembath had constructed a boathouse, and offered to supervise the new lifeboat.

On 23 October 1868, in a strong gale, the vessel Devon hit the Brisons stern on. The Captain, his wife and two children, and 14 crew, were lost. In a first of its kind rescue, the rocket apparatus was taken aboard the lifeboat Cousins William and Mary Ann of Bideford, after the Mate was seen the following day, still clinging to the rocks. A line was fired across to him, followed by a buoy, and he was hauled back to the lifeboat. Coxswain Matthew Nicholson and Coastguard Officer Sylvester Morrison were each awarded the RNLI Silver Medal.

The boathouse had been extended in 1864, for the arrival of the 34 ft (10 m) Cousins William and Mary Ann of Bideford, but in 1875, it was replaced by a new boathouse, built on the landward side of the road, at a cost of £268. This boathouse was replaced again twenty years later, when one was constructed on the original site, at a cost of £1,560.

The first motor lifeboat arrived at Sennen Cove in 1922. The new 40 ft (12 m) lifeboat was essentially an old style self-righting P&S lifeboat with a drop-keel, fitted with a single 45-hp Tylor engine, while still retaining sails and oars. At a ceremony on 28 August 1922, the lifeboat was presented to the Sennen Cove branch. Costing £8,622, the new boat was funded by Mr R. A. Newbon, late of Kensington, whose legacy had previously funded five P&S lifeboats, and was named The Newbons (ON 674).

In preparation for this new larger boat, the boathouse was again modified in 1919, given a new slipway, with a turntable fitted inside, so that the lifeboat could be hauled up the slipway bow-first and then turned ready for its next service. The whole project cost £11,000. Ten years later a second slipway was provided for ease of recovery.

=== 1994 onwards ===
In 1994 an ILB was added to the station. This is kept in the boathouse. When it was to be launched it was craned onto the slipway and taken down to the water on a carriage, but a new slipway was provided to make launching the ILB easier at low tide. At the same time the boathouse was modified to take a longer Tyne-class boat, and in 2001 the roof was removed and a new one installed ready to receive the taller, faster Tamar-class lifeboat. New crew facilities were installed at the same time. The construction works to accommodate the Tamar lifeboat cost £4 milliom.

The current Sennen Cove Tamar-class All-weather lifeboat, 16-14 City of London III (ON 1294) was funded from donations to the City of London Committee and the Local Cornish Lifeboat Appeal, and was placed on service on 7 January 2010.

In the 2010 Birthday Honours, Second Coxswain Philip Charles Shannon was awarded the MBE, for voluntary service to Sennen Cove Lifeboat.

== Description ==
The lifeboat station stands on the beach at the head of two slipways. The masonry walls date from 1929 but the shallowly curved metal roof was added in 2001. Inside, as well as the boathouse, is a three-storey crew facility. The ground floor is a changing room for the ILB crew, above that is a similar facility for the ALB crew, and on the top floor is a crew room. A viewing gallery for the lifeboat and boat hall also incorporates the souvenir outlet.

== Area of operation ==
The RNLI aims to reach any casualty up to 50 miles (80 km) from its stations, and within two hours in good weather. To do this the Tamar-class lifeboat at Sennen Cove has an operating range of 250 nautical miles (460 km) and a top speed of 25 knots (46 km/h). Adjacent lifeboats are at Penlee Lifeboat Station to the south, St Mary's on the Isles of Scilly to the west, and St Ives to the north.

== Service awards ==
Coxswain Henry Nicholas, received the RNLI Silver Medal in 1909, for an arduous service to the Fairport of Liverpool, going out twice, and standing by for many hours, until a tug arrived.

A silver medal and three bronze medals were given in 1919, for the rescue of eight people from the SS Falmouth Castle. That same year, for saving eight people from a motor launch, Coxswain Henry Nicholas and Second Coxswain Thomas Pender each received the silver medal, while the 12 crew members were each awarded bronze medals. One of the crew was 17-year-old Henry Nicholas Junior. He later became coxswain and 45-years-later in 1964, was awarded a second bronze medal (clasp), for leading the rescue of five people from the trawler Victoire Roger, which had caught fire.

French Maritime Medals in Bronze were awarded for the rescue of six of the crew of 18, from the French trawler Jeanne Gougy, when it was wrecked in the early morning of 3 November 1962 on the Armed Knight Rock.

Coxswain/Mechanic Horace Eric Pengilly was awarded with a silver medal, after a fruitless 6-hour search in terrible conditions for survivors of the MV Union Crystal, which sank on 16 November 1977, although he died before he received the medal. Another sinking vessel, the Tungufoss, resulted in seven lives being saved and Coxswain/Mechanic Maurice Hutchens receiving a silver medal in 1981. In 1995 Coxswain Terence George was awarded a bronze medal for the rescue of five people from the fishing vessel Julian Paul.

The following are awards made at Sennen Cove:

- RNIPLS Gold Medal
  Capt. George Davies, RN, Inspecting Commander, HM Coastguard, Penzance – 1851
  Cmdr. Thomas Randall Forward, Revenue Cutter Sylvia – 1851
- RNIPLS Silver Medal
  James Burne, Commissioned Boatman, HM Coastguard, Penzance – 1851
  William Henry Selly, Commissioned Boatman, HM Coastguard, Penzance – 1851
  Robert Eastaway, Boatman, HM Coastguard, Penzance – 1851
  Thomas Kerley, Boatman, HM Coastguard, Penzance – 1851
  Charles S. Carr, Gunner, Revenue Cutter Sylvia – 1851
  Henry Jones, Mariner, Revenue Cutter Sylvia – 1851
  Henry Richards, Mariner, Revenue Cutter Sylvia – 1851
  James Richards, Mariner, Revenue Cutter Sylvia – 1851
  William Surry, Mariner, Revenue Cutter Sylvia – 1851
  James Ward, First Class Boy, Revenue Cutter Sylvia – 1851
- RNLI Silver Medal
  Matthew Nicholas, Coxswain – 1868
  Sylvester Morrison, Chief Officer, H.M. Coastguard, Sennen Cove – 1868
  Henry Nicholas, Coxswain – 1909
  Alfred Jackson, fisherman – 1919
  Thomas Henry Nicholas, Coxswain – 1920
  Thomas Pender, Second Coxswain – 1920
  Horace Eric Pengilly, Coxswain/Mechanic – 1978 (post.)
  Maurice Hutchens, Coxswain/Mechanic – 1981
- RNLI Bronze Medal
  Thomas Hicks, Master of the Drifter Ben-ma-Chree – 1919
  David Sleeman Jr., fisherman – 1919
  Edward Sleeman, fisherman – 1919
  Edmund George, crew member – 1920
  Edward George, crew member – 1920
  Ernest George, crew member – 1920
  Thomas George, crew member – 1920
  Edward Nicholas, crew member – 1920
  Henry Nicholas, crew member – 1920
  Henry Nicholas Jr., crew member – 1920
  Herbert Nicholas, crew member – 1920
  James Howard Nicholas, crew member – 1920
  John Nicholas, crew member – 1920
  John Penrose, crew member – 1920
  Robert Roberts, crew member – 1920
  Henry Nicholas, Coxswain – 1964 (Second-Service Clasp)
  Terence George, Coxswain – 1995
- The Thanks of the Institution inscribed on Vellum
  Sennen Lifeboat Crew – 1978
- A special framed certificate
  The coxswain and crew – 1979 (Fastnet Race)
- French Maritime Bronze Medals and certificates
  Henry Nicholas, Coxswain – 1962
  J. H. Nicholas, Second Coxswain – 1962
  Edmund George, Bowman – 1962
  Richard George, Motor Mechanic – 1962
- Icelandic awards for valour, presented by The President of Iceland
  Sennen Lifeboat Crew – 1981
- Member, Order of the British Empire (MBE)
  Philip Charles Shannon, Second Coxswain – 2010QBH

== Sennen Cove lifeboats ==
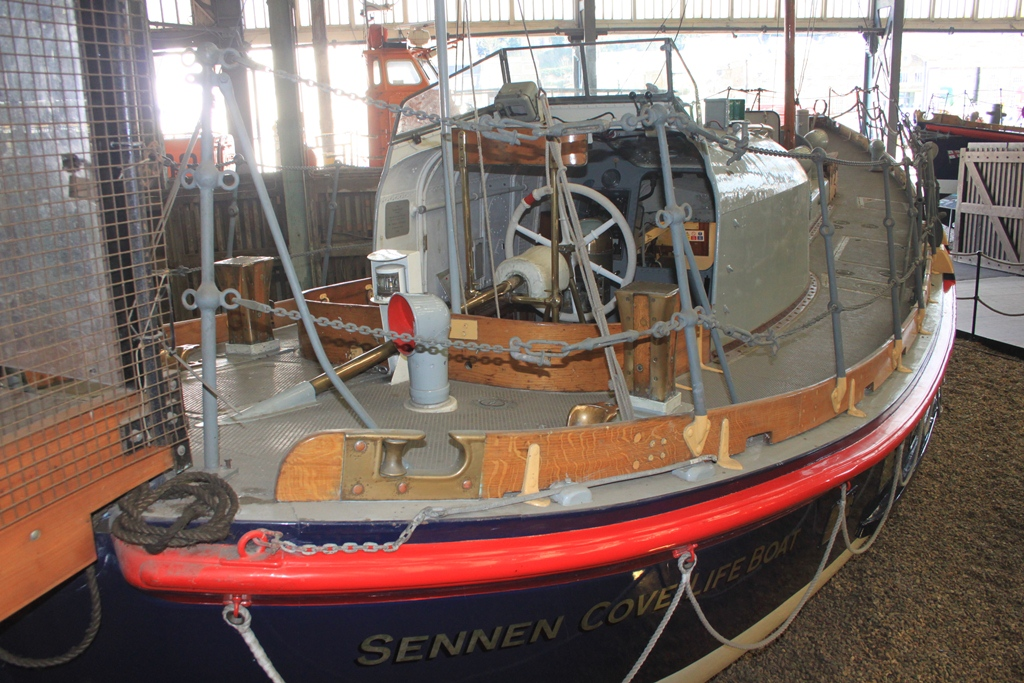
Susan Ashley 1948–1973

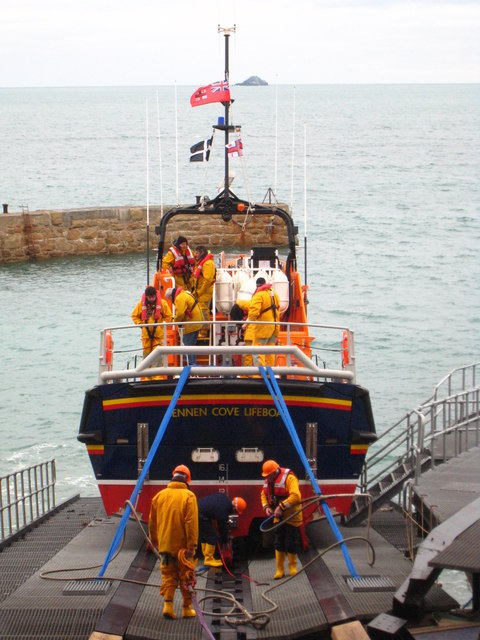
City of London III (From 2010)

=== Pulling and Sailing (P&S) lifeboats ===
On station	ON (Note: ON is the RNLI's Official Number of the boat.)	Name	Built	Class	Comments
1853–1864	Pre-263	Unnamed	1853	25-foot 8in Peake Self-righting (P&S)	(Note: 25 ft 8 in (7.82 m) x 6 ft 10 in (2.08 m) (6-oared) Peake-class self-righting (P&S) lifeboat, funded by the Institution, built by Forrestt of Limehouse, London, costing £141.); Broken up in 1864.
1864–1880	Pre-417	Cousins William and Mary Ann of Bideford	1864	34-foot Peake Self-righting (P&S)	(Note: 33 ft 0 in (10.06 m) x 8 ft 0 in (2.44 m) (10-oared) Peake-class self-righting (P&S) lifeboat, gift of Mrs M. A. Davis of Bideford, built by Forrestt of Limehouse, London, costing £250.); Damaged and broken up in 1880.
1880–1893	182	Denzil and Maria Onslow	1880	34-foot Self-righting (P&S)	(Note: 35 ft 0 in (10.67 m) x 8 ft 3 in (2.51 m) (10-oared) self-righting (P&S) lifeboat, gift of Miss M. Onslow of Faygate, Surrey, built by Woolfe of Shadwell, London, costing £363.); Broken up in 1893.
1893–1922	357	Ann Newbon	1893	35-foot Self-righting (P&S)	(Note: 34 ft 0 in (10.36 m) x 8 ft 3 in (2.51 m) (10-oared) self-righting (P&S) lifeboat, legacy of Mr R. A, Newbon of London, built by Woolfe of Shadwell, London, costing £498.); Condemned and sold in 1922.

Pre ON numbers are unofficial numbers used by the Lifeboat Enthusiasts' Society to reference early lifeboats not included on the official RNLI list.

=== Motor lifeboats ===
On station	ON	Op.No. (Note: Op.No. is the RNLI's Operational Number of the boat carried on the hull.)	Name	Built	Class	Comments
1922–1948	674	—	The Newbons	1922	40-foot Self-righting (motor)	Transferred to Port St Mary
1948–1973	856	—	Susan Ashley	1948	41-foot Watson	Later at Barry Dock and Tynemouth. Retired in 1981 and since 1996 preserved in the RNLI Heritage Collection at Chatham Historic Dockyard, December 2025.
1973–1991	999	37-28	Diana White	1973	Rother	Sold in 1992, Renamed Joseph Day. Last reported as Diana White, stripped down hull for sale, Katikati, New Zealand, January 2023.
1991–1998	1176	12-19	The Four Boys	1991	Mersey	Transferred to the relief fleet. Later at Amble.
1998–2010	1121	47-016	Norman Salvesen	1988	Tyne	Previously at Wick. Sold in 2014. Unaltered, at Conwy, December 2025.
2010–	1294	16-14	City of London III	2009	Tamar	

More post-service details can be found on the respective lifeboat class pages.

=== Inshore lifeboats ===
On station	Op.No.	Name	Class	Comments
1994–1995	D-450	Anthony	D-class (EA16)	Initially deployed in the Relief Fleet in 1993.
1995–1996	D-448	Sea Ranger	D-class (EA16)	Initially deployed in the Relief Fleet in 1993.
1996–2004	D-490	Spirit of the ACC	D-class (EA16)	
2004–2013	D-624	Spirit of The Royal Logistic Corps	D-class (IB1)	
2013–2024	D-763	Amy Brown	D-class (IB1)	
2024–	D-896	Arangy	D-class (IB1)	

== See also ==
- List of RNLI stations
- List of former RNLI stations
- Royal National Lifeboat Institution lifeboats
