= Holy Island Lifeboat Station =

Former lifeboat station in Northumberland, England

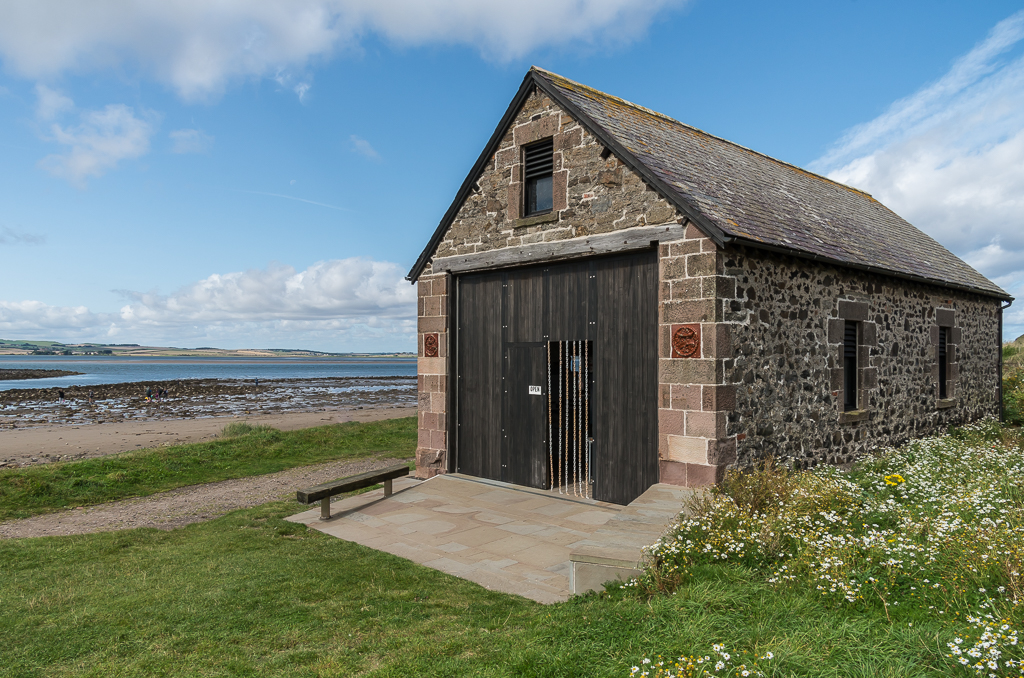
- 1884 Holy Island No. 1 Lifeboat House

- Location within Northumberland

General information
- Status: Closed
- Type: RNLI Lifeboat Station
- Location: Lindisfarne, Northumberland, England
- Coordinates: 55°40′08.1″N 1°48′11.4″W
- Opened: 1802
- Closed: 1968

Holy Island Lifeboat Station was the collective name given to lifeboat stations located on and around the tidal island of Lindisfarne, also known as Holy Island, which is located approximately 8 nautical miles (15 km; 9.2 mi) south-east of Berwick-upon-Tweed, sitting off the coast of Northumberland.

A lifeboat was first stationed here by the Crewe Trustees in 1803. Management of the station was transferred to the Royal National Lifeboat Institution (RNLI) in 1865.

After 166 years, the last of the Holy Island Lifeboat Stations in operation was closed in 1968.

== History ==
In 1802, plans were made to station a lifeboat on Holy Island by the Crewe Trustees, a charitable organisation founded by Nathaniel Crewe, Bishop of Durham in 1704. The Trustees were indebted to a Mr Selby, for granting a site for a boathouse, and the 'winning of stones' (quarrying the building material), for its construction. A 31-foot lifeboat was ordered from Henry Greathead, delivered to the Trustees at Bamburgh Castle on 2 September 1802, and established on the island as one of the earliest lifeboat stations in 1803.

Ever since its founding in 1824, the Royal National Institution for the Preservation of Life from Shipwreck (RNIPLS), later to become the RNLI in 1854, would award medals for deeds of gallantry at sea, even if no lifeboats were involved. On 30 October 1825, the sloop John and Jessie was wrecked on Parton Stell in a violent gale. Six people were washed away, including the Master and four young ladies. George Joy, Master of the Revenue cutter Mermaid arrived on scene to find 100 spectators refusing to make any effort to rescue the three remaining crew, clinging to the mast. With the help of his own crew, and local fishermen, a boat was brought overland, and was launched. After great difficulty, and being driven back several times, the three men were rescued, just before the mast was washed away. George Joy was awarded the RNIPLS Gold Medal.

In 1832, three lifeboats were placed on public display at Newcastle Quay. The first was a new lifeboat built by Mr. E Robson of South Shields for a new station at North Sunderland, the second and third were boats modified to the Palmer design, with removable airboxes. One was for Tynemouth, and the second was for Holy Island. The Holy Island lifeboat, a 27-foot Whaleboat, had been constructed by Shore of Blackwall, London in 1827, to a design by Capt. John Foulerton, RN. Some reports say it had originally been in service at Holy Island before being sent for modifications, others that it had never been on service since construction.

In 1838, with the crew at Holy Island requesting a larger boat, the boats from Holy Island and North Sunderland were exchanged. The Crewe Trustees had joined the Port of Newcastle Association for the Preservation of Life from Shipwreck (PNAPLS), and they were grateful to receive a donation of £25 from Trinity House for the reconstruction of the lifeboat house, to accommodate the larger lifeboat. Trinity House would place an additional boat at Ross Links in 1839.

Between 1825 and 1839, seven medals for gallantry were awarded at Holy Island.

On 2 March 1865, management of Holy Island Lifeboat Station was taken over by the RNLI, and a new 32-foot self-righting 'Pulling and Sailing' (P&S) lifeboat, one with sails and (10) oars, was provided to the station, along with a new carriage, transported as near as possible by the Great Northern and North Eastern railway companies. A gift of £600 had been received to refurbish the station from the anonymous Lady "W", via Sir William G. Armstrong, 1st Baron Armstrong, CB FRS. In honour of the local heroine, the lifeboat was named Grace Darling.

A No. 2 Station was more permanently established at Ross Links in 1868, with the construction of a boathouse costing £220, and the placement of another 32-foot self-righting (P&S) lifeboat, replacing the Trinity House boat placed there in 1839. The cost of the lifeboat and equipment was defrayed from the gift of £420 from the late Mr J. F. Frith, and Mrs J. F. Frith, of London, and at their request, the lifeboat was named Bombay.

A new lifeboat 34-foot 3in x 8-foot 3in (10-oared) self-righting (P&S) lifeboat was sent to the No. 1 station in July 1884, to replace the Grace Darling, which had been damaged. Funded from the bequest of the late Miss Ann Egdell of Alnwick, the lifeboat again took the name Grace Darling (ON 1), and was the first lifeboat recorded on the new official RNLI list. A new boathouse was constructed by Mr Brigham to house the larger lifeboat, at a cost of £280-2s-8d.

The No. 2 lifeboat was launched only once on service, into hurricane-force conditions on 6 November 1890, to the aid of the schooner Flower of Ross. The lifeboat was badly damaged during the call, but the crew of five were rescued.

It was decided that the No. 2 lifeboat be replaced. Funded from the estate of the late Miss A. M. Bedford of Pershore, a new lifeboat was constructed by Woolfe of Shadwell, and dispatched by rail on 23 March 1891. The lifeboat was taken by rail to York, and paraded through the streets of the city. At a ceremony on 1 April 1891, the lifeboat was named Bedford (ON 314), and launched for a demonstration in the River Ouse, later continuing on to the station at Ross Links. The Bedford was on service for just nine years, but was never called out, and was replaced in 1900 after it was condemned.

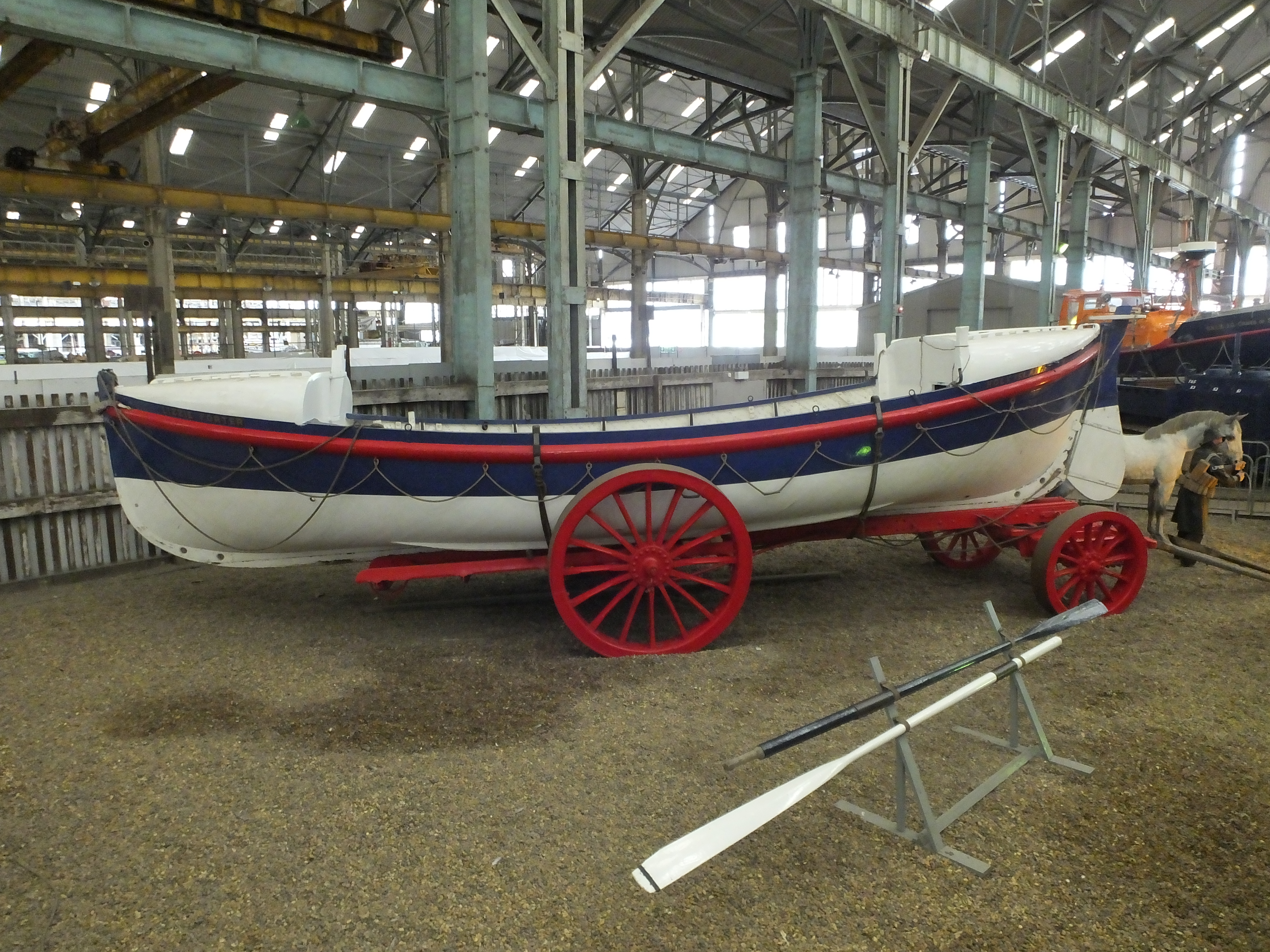
Holy Island No. 1 Lifeboat Lizzie Porter in the RNLI Historic Collection at Chatham Historic Dockyard

Eight years later in 1908, it was decided to close the Ross Links station, which was actually on the mainland, and relocate the current No. 2 lifeboat, Edward and Eliza (ON 454), to a new boathouse, which had been constructed at The Snook, on the north-west corner of Holy Island.

In 1924, the RNLI announced that the replacement for the No. 1 lifeboat Lizzie Porter (ON 597) would be a motor-powered 45-foot Watson-class lifeboat, Milburn (ON 692), which would be far to large and heavy to use the existing 1884 boathouse. A new boathouse with a deep-water roller-slipway was constructed on the south of the Island, between the existing boathouse and the harbour, at a cost of £10,400. A cottage was also constructed for the mechanic, at a cost of £600.

With no calls in nine years, the No.2 lifeboat station was closed on 31 March 1934. The Edward and Eliza (ON 454) was sold from service, finally being broken up in Alnwick in 2007.

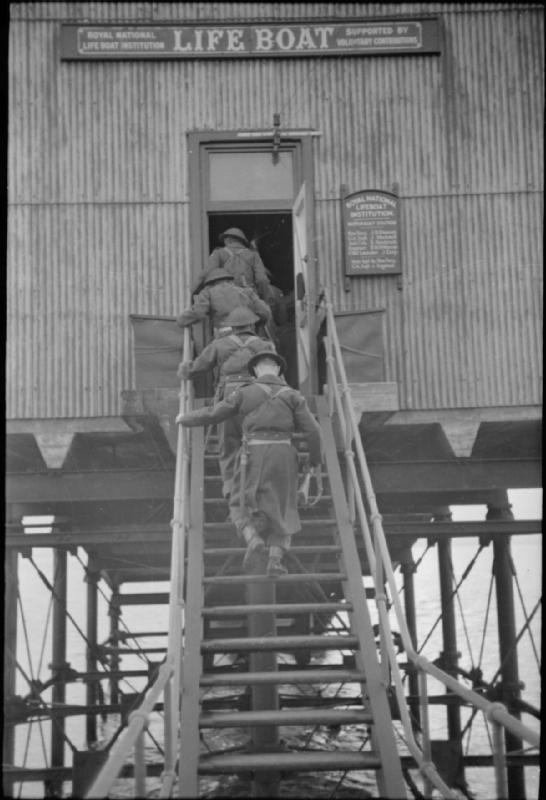
1924 Holy Island No. 1 station

Milburn would serve at Holy Island for the next 21 years. The replacement would be a slightly larger 46-foot Watson-class lifeboat, Gertrude (ON 847), which would go on to serve for a further 22 years.

At a coastal review in 1968, it was decided to withdraw the lifeboat at Holy Island, and the station was closed on 31 March 1968.

The last lifeboat on station, Gertrude, saw further service at Exmouth, Sheerness and Fowey, before being sold from service in 1982. In 2024, she survives as a pleasure boat at Mevagissey.

As per the terms of the lease of land, the 1924 lifeboat station was demolished after the station closed. The concrete piles of the No. 2 station at The Snook are still visible, and the 1884 No. 1 lifeboat house still stands, now used as a lifeboat museum. In 2023, the lifeboat museum was 'transformed' to be Pilgrim's Cottage, for an episode of the TV Drama Vera.

== Station honours ==
The following are awards made at Holy Island.

- RNIPLS Gold Medal

George Joy, Master of the Revenue Cutter Mermaid – 1826

- RNIPLS Silver Medal

James Allen, Pilot – 1825

Thomas Wilson, Pilot – 1826

Ralph Wilson, Ruler of Pilots – 1830

Lt. Edward Bunbury Nott, RN, Commander of the Revenue Cutter Mermaid – 1837

Lt. Daniel Dooley, RN, H.M. Coastguard, Holy Island – 1838
William Wilson, Pilot – 1839

- RNLI Silver Medal

Matthew Kyle, Coxswain – 1879
George Kyle, Assistant Coxswain – 1879

George Markwell, Coxswain – 1879

Matthew Kyle, Coxswain – 1898 (Second-Service clasp)

George Cromarty, Coxswain – 1916

George Cromarty, Coxswain – 1922 (Second-Service clasp)

- RNLI Bronze Medal

William Wilson, Second Coxswain – 1922
Thomas A. Stevenson, Bowman – 1922

- The Thanks of the Institution inscribed on Vellum

Rev. D. Bryson – 1896

Thomas Kyle, Second Coxswain – 1916

Thomas Kyle, Coxswain – 1934

- A Collective Letter of Thanks signed by the Chairman of the Institution

The Women Lifeboat Launchers of Holy Island – 1922

== Holy Island lifeboats ==
=== No. 1 Station ===
55°40′08.1″N 1°48′11.4″W

ON (Note: ON is the RNLI's Official Number of the boat.)	Name	Built	On station	Class	Comments
–	Unnamed	1802	1802–????	31-foot Greathead	(Note: 31-foot x 10-foot 6in (10-oared) non-self-righting lifeboat, built by Henry Greathead, costing £200)
Pre-127	Unnamed	1827	1832–1838	27-foot Whaleboat (Palmer)	(Note: 27-foot x 6-foot (6-oared) Whaleboat, built by Shore of Blackwall, London, later modified to the Palmer design.)
–	Unnamed	1832	1838–1852	32-foot Self-righting (P&S)	(Note: 32-foot self-righting (P&S) lifeboat, built by Mr E. Robson of South Shields.)
Pre-436	Grace Darling	1865	1865–1884	32-foot Self-righting (P&S)	(Note: 32-foot x 7-foot 4 in (10-oared) self-righting (P&S) lifeboat, built by Woolfe of Shadwell.)
1	Grace Darling	1884	1884–1909	34-foot 3in Self-righting (P&S)	(Note: 34-foot 3in x 8-foot 3in (10-oared) self-righting (P&S) lifeboat, built by Woolfe of Shadwell, costing £363.)
597	Lizzie Porter	1909	1909–1925	35-foot Self-righting (P&S)	(Note: 35-foot x 8-foot 6in (10-oared) self-righting (P&S) lifeboat, built by Thames Ironworks, costing £823.)
692	Milburn	1925	1925–1946	45-foot Watson	(Note: 45-foot x 12-foot 6in Watson-class lifeboat, built by S. E. Saunders of Cowes, with a single 80 hp 'Weyburn' DE6 petrol-engine, delivering 8.24 knots, and costing £8,449.)
847	Gertrude	1946	1946–1968	46-foot Watson	(Note: 46-foot x 12-foot 9in Watson-class lifeboat, built by Rowhedge Ironworks of Essex, with twin 40 hp Ferry VE4 diesel engines, providing 8 knots, and costing £17,048.)

Station Closed, 1968

=== No. 2 Station (Ross Links) ===
55°38′59.0″N 1°47′14.2″W

ON	Name	Built	On station	Class	Comments
–	Unnamed	–	1839–1868	Trinity House Lifeboat	
Pre-515	Bombay	1868	1868–1891	32-foot Self-righting (P&S)	(Note: 32-foot x 7-foot 4in (10-oared) self-righting (P&S) lifeboat, built by Woolfe of Shadwell, London, and costing £251.)
314	Bedford	1891	1891–1900	31-foot Self-righting (P&S)	(Note: 31-foot x 7-foot 3in (10-oared) self-righting (P&S) lifeboat, built by Woolfe of Shadwell, costing £306.)
454	Edward and Eliza	1900	1900–1908	34-foot Dungeness (Rubie)	(Note: 34-foot x 8-foot (10-oared) self-righting Dungeness-class (Rubie) lifeboat, built by Thames Ironworks, costing £668.)

Station Closed, 1908

=== No. 2 Station (The Snook) ===
55°41′15.3″N 1°50′52.0″W

ON	Name	Built	On station	Class	Comments
454	Edward and Eliza	1900	1908–1934	34-foot Dungeness (Rubie) (P&S)	(Note: 34-foot x 8-foot (10-oared) Dungeness-class (Rubie) self-righting (P&S) lifeboat, built by Thames Ironworks, costing £668.)

Station Closed, 1934

Pre ON numbers are unofficial numbers used by the Lifeboat Enthusiast Society to reference early lifeboats not included on the official RNLI list.

== See also ==
- List of RNLI stations
- List of former RNLI stations
- Royal National Lifeboat Institution lifeboats
