= 45ft Watson-class lifeboat =

Former RNLI lifeboat class

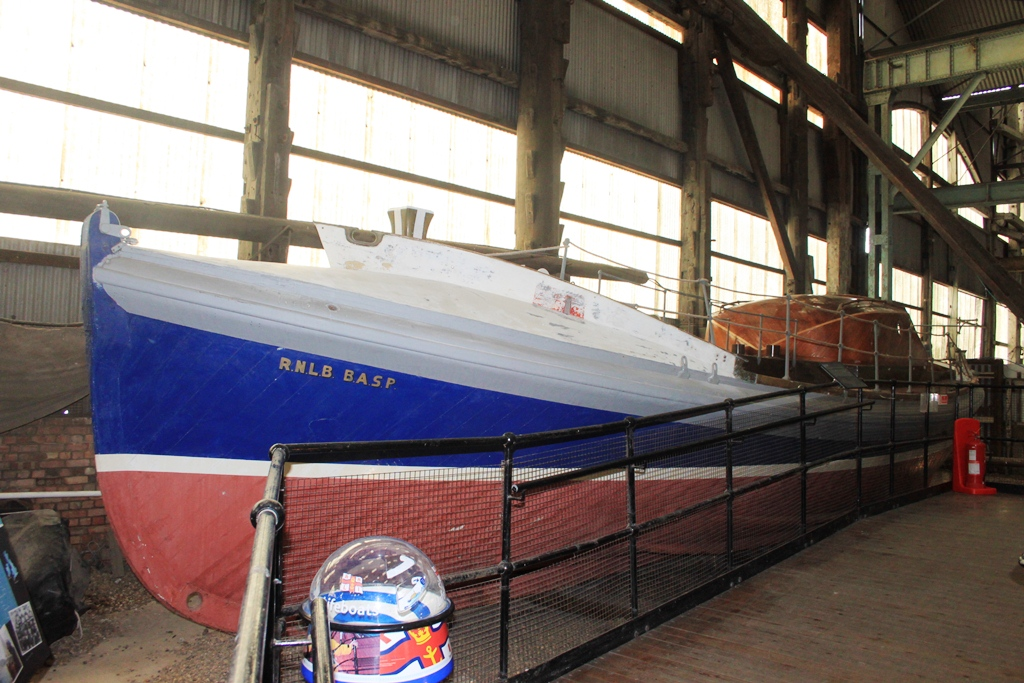
- 45ft Watson-class RNLB B.A.S.P. (ON 687) in the RNLI Heritage Collection at Chatham Historic Dockyard.

Class overview
- Name: 45ft Watson-class
- Builders: S. E. Saunders Cowes; J. Samuel White Cowes; Thames Ironworks and Shipbuilding Company Blackwall, London; Summers & Payne, Southampton
- Operators: Royal National Lifeboat Institution
- Preceded by: various
- Succeeded by: 45ft 6in Watson-class
- Cost: £6,000–£8,500
- Built: (1912), 1919–1925
- In service: 1912–1956
- Completed: 22
- Lost: 1
- Retired: 21

General characteristics
- Class & type: 45ft Watson-class motor lifeboat
- Length: 45 ft (14 m)
- Beam: 12 ft 6 in (3.81 m)
- Propulsion: 1 x 60-bhp Tylor D1 4-cyl petrol; 1 x 80-bhp Weyburn DE6 6-cyl petrol
- Speed: 8 knots (15 km/h; 9.2 mph)
- Range: 125 nmi (232 km; 144 mi)
- Crew: 8–12

The 45 ft Watson-class was a non self-righting displacement hull lifeboat built between 1919 and 1925, and operated by the Royal National Lifeboat Institution between 1919 and 1956.

== History ==
In 1898 the first 45 ft Watson was built, one of the largest pulling and sailing lifeboats built for the RNLI. Only three of these 45 footers were built, the last in 1901.

The third boat, Albert Edward (ON 463), was based at Clacton-on-Sea, and after eleven years service, was taken in hand for rebuilding with a motor. A 40-bhp Tylor C 4-cylinder petrol engine was fitted but little else was changed and, like all single engine lifeboats, a full sailing rig and drop keel was retained. The boat returned to service at Clacton in 1912 and served there until 1929.

With the conversion of ON 463 deemed a success, plans were put in hand for the production of a series of 45 ft Watson motors, but due to the First World War, the first boat did not appear until 1919.

== Description ==
Like ON 463, the first eleven production boats were open decked and retained full sail plans and a drop keel. The first seven boats were powered by a 60-bhp Tylor D1 6-cylinder petrol engine, while the rest had an RNLI designed 80-bhp DE6 6-cylinder petrol engine, nine of which were built by Weyburn Engineering, and five by J. Samuel White.

Experience showed that the open deck layout was inadequate for the longer services operated by the motor lifeboats, and from the late 1920s, a shelter was added ahead of the steering position. The final ten boats, built from 1923, John R. Webb (ON 684), were to a revised design with a cabin capable of taking twenty survivors ahead of the engine room.

== Fleet ==
=== 45ft Watson-class ===
ON (Note: ON is the RNLI's Official Number of the boat.)	Name	Built	In service	Stations	Shelter	Comments
463	Albert Edward	1901	1912–1929	Clacton-on-Sea	No	(Note: Gift of the Freemasons of England, built by Thames Ironworks of Blackwall, London, costing £1,890. 40-bhp Tylor C 4-cyl. petrol engine motor conversion, 1912.); Sold October 1932. At Haven Marina, Ipswich, October 2023.
463	Albert Edward	1901	1929–1932	Arranmore	No	Sold October 1932. At Haven Marina, Ipswich, October 2023.
648	Elsie	1919	1919–1930	St Mary's	1927	(Note: Gift of the Rt. Hon. A. Morley, built by S. E. Saunders of Cowes, with single 60-bhp Tylor D1 4-cyl. petrol engine, costing £6,295.); Sold January 1951. Renamed Happy Return. Last reported as a yacht in Tahiti, 1960.
648	Elsie	1919	1930–1946	Helvick Head	1927	Sold January 1951. Renamed Happy Return. Last reported as a yacht in Tahiti, 1960.
648	Elsie	1919	1946–1951	Relief fleet	1927	Sold January 1951. Renamed Happy Return. Last reported as a yacht in Tahiti, 1960.
649	Duke of Connaught	1919	1919–1920	Baltimore	1928	(Note: Gift of the Freemasons of England, built by S. E. Saunders of Cowes, with single 60-bhp Tylor D1 4-cyl. petrol engine, costing £6,013.); Intended to be Duke of Connaught, but named Shamrock at the naming ceremony in 1920. (See ON 668)
649	Shamrock	1919	1920–1950	Baltimore	1928	(Note: Funded by the RNLI, (the gift of the Freemasons of England redirected to ON 668)); Sold February 1952. Last reported at Bowling Canal Basin, Dumbarton, June 1991.
649	Shamrock	1919	1950–1952	Relief fleet	1928	Sold February 1952. Last reported at Bowling Canal Basin, Dumbarton, June 1991.
653	William Evans	1921	1921–1927	Wexford	1927	(Note: Legacy of Mr W. Evans, part built by Summers and Payne of Southampton, completed by S. E. Saunders of Cowes, with single 60-bhp Tylor D1 4-cyl. petrol engine, costing £7,730.); Sold November 1940.
653	William Evans	1921	1927–1927	Rosslare Harbour	1927	Sold November 1940.
653	William Evans	1921	1927–1939	Galway Bay	1927	Sold November 1940.
654	Joseph Adlam	1921	1921–1948	Blyth	1928	(Note: Legacy of Mr J. Adlam, built by S. E. Saunders of Cowes, with single 60-bhp Tylor D1 4-cyl. petrol engine, costing £7,020.); Sold February 1952.
654	Joseph Adlam	1921	1948–1951	Relief fleet	1928	Sold February 1952.
658	Dunleary (Civil Service No.7)	1919	1919–1938	Kingstown	1928	(Note: Gift of Civil Service LB fund, built by S. E. Saunders of Cowes, with single 60-bhp Tylor D1 4-cyl. petrol engine, costing £6,074.); Sold May 1951. Under restoration as Dunleary by the Dunleary Restoration Project, at Coal Harbour, Dún Laoghaire, December 2025.
658	Dunleary (Civil Service No.7)	1919	1939–1951	Lytham St Annes	1928	Sold May 1951. Under restoration as Dunleary by the Dunleary Restoration Project, at Coal Harbour, Dún Laoghaire, December 2025.
659	Frederick and Emma	1921	1921–1938	Wick	1929	(Note: Legacy of Mrs E. M. Beer, built by S. E. Saunders of Cowes, with single 60-bhp Tylor D1 4-cyl. petrol engine, costing £7,141.); Sold August 1950. Renamed Stadats. A yacht at Melton Boatyard, Melton, Suffolk, December 2025.
659	Frederick and Emma	1921	1939–1950	Amble	1929	Sold August 1950. Renamed Stadats. A yacht at Melton Boatyard, Melton, Suffolk, December 2025.
668	Duke of Connaught	1921	1921–1939	Peterhead No.2	1927	(Note: Gift of the Freemasons of England reallocated from ON 649, built by S. E. Saunders of Cowes, with single 60-bhp Tylor D1 4-cyl. petrol engine, costing £6,889.); Sold October 1951. Renamed King John II. Last reported at Uppsala, Sweden, July 2012.
668	Duke of Connaught	1921	1939–1951	Relief fleet	1927	Sold October 1951. Renamed King John II. Last reported at Uppsala, Sweden, July 2012.
671	The Brothers	1922	1922–1931	Penlee	1929	(Note: Gift of the Misses H. H. A. and C. M Eddy, built by J. Samuel White of Cowes, with single 80-bhp Weyburn DE6 6-cyl. petrol engine, costing £13,214.); Sold August 1952. Renamed Admiral Douglas. Reported as The Brothers to have been broken up at Gweek Classic Boatyard. Hull now at Ferry Bridge Marine, Portland Beach Road, Weymouth, December 2025.
671	The Brothers	1922	1931–1934	Falmouth	1929	Sold August 1952. Renamed Admiral Douglas. Reported as The Brothers to have been broken up at Gweek Classic Boatyard. Hull now at Ferry Bridge Marine, Portland Beach Road, Weymouth, December 2025.
671	The Brothers	1922	1934–1937	Relief fleet	1929	Sold August 1952. Renamed Admiral Douglas. Reported as The Brothers to have been broken up at Gweek Classic Boatyard. Hull now at Ferry Bridge Marine, Portland Beach Road, Weymouth, December 2025.
671	The Brothers	1922	1937–1938	Selsey	1929	Sold August 1952. Renamed Admiral Douglas. Reported as The Brothers to have been broken up at Gweek Classic Boatyard. Hull now at Ferry Bridge Marine, Portland Beach Road, Weymouth, December 2025.
671	The Brothers	1922	1938–1946	Relief fleet	1929	Sold August 1952. Renamed Admiral Douglas. Reported as The Brothers to have been broken up at Gweek Classic Boatyard. Hull now at Ferry Bridge Marine, Portland Beach Road, Weymouth, December 2025.
671	The Brothers	1922	1946–1947	Plymouth	1929	Sold August 1952. Renamed Admiral Douglas. Reported as The Brothers to have been broken up at Gweek Classic Boatyard. Hull now at Ferry Bridge Marine, Portland Beach Road, Weymouth, December 2025.
671	The Brothers	1922	1948–1952	Workington	1929	Sold August 1952. Renamed Admiral Douglas. Reported as The Brothers to have been broken up at Gweek Classic Boatyard. Hull now at Ferry Bridge Marine, Portland Beach Road, Weymouth, December 2025.
678	Edward, Prince of Wales	1924	1924–1947	The Mumbles	1928	(Note: Gift of the Welsh LB fund, built by J. Samuel White of Cowes, with single 80-bhp Weyburn DE6 6-cyl. petrol engine, costing £12,811.); Capsized on service with eight crew lost, 23 April 1947. Boat later destroyed by fire.
679	Elizabeth Newton	1923	1924–1939	Hartlepool	1928	(Note: Legacy of Mr R. Newton, built by J. Samuel White of Cowes, with single 80-bhp Weyburn DE6 6-cyl. petrol engine, costing £12,724.); Sold May 1953. Renamed Viking. Lost at Rhyl, 1981.
679	Elizabeth Newton	1923	1939–1940	Berwick-upon-Tweed	1928	Sold May 1953. Renamed Viking. Lost at Rhyl, 1981.
679	Elizabeth Newton	1923	1940–1953	Relief fleet	1928	Sold May 1953. Renamed Viking. Lost at Rhyl, 1981.
680	City of Bradford	1923	1923–1929	Humber	1929	(Note: Gift of the City of Bradford LB fund, built by J. Samuel White of Cowes, with single 80-bhp Weyburn DE6 6-cyl. petrol engine, costing £12,758.); Renamed City of Bradford I in 1929.
680	City of Bradford I	1923	1929–1930	Relief fleet	1929	Sold October 1952. Renamed Hammer. Last reported at Isle of Arran, 1980s.
680	City of Bradford I	1923	1930–1932	Humber No.2	1929	Sold October 1952. Renamed Hammer. Last reported at Isle of Arran, 1980s.
680	City of Bradford I	1923	1932–1952	Relief fleet	1929	Sold October 1952. Renamed Hammer. Last reported at Isle of Arran, 1980s.

=== 45ft Watson-class (Revised) ===
ON	Name	Built	In service	Stations	Comments
684	John R. Webb	1923	1923–1930	Tenby	(Note: Legacy of Mr J. R. Webb, built by J. Samuel White of Cowes, with single 80-bhp Weyburn DE6 6-cyl. petrol engine, costing £8,747.); Renamed 684 RM in 1931.
684	684 RM	1923	1931–1932	Barra Island	Renamed Hearts of Oak in 1934.
684	684 RM	1923	1932–1934	Relief fleet	Renamed Hearts of Oak in 1934.
684	Hearts of Oak	1923	1934–1936	Yarmouth	(Note: Fitted with 85-hp Ferry Diesel engines, 1934.); Sold 1955. Renamed William Bradley. Stored for restoration as Hearts of Oak on the Yonne (river), Migennes, France, December 2024.
684	Hearts of Oak	1923	1937–1955	Relief fleet	Sold 1955. Renamed William Bradley. Stored for restoration as Hearts of Oak on the Yonne (river), Migennes, France, December 2024.
685	J. W. Archer	1924	1924–1950	Teesmouth	(Note: Legacy of Mr J. W. Archer, built by J. Samuel White of Cowes, with single 80-bhp White DE6 6-cyl. petrol engine, costing £7,515.); Sold July 1956. Renamed Brighter Hope (HL 44). In storage as J. W. Archer at TCC Plant, Middlesbrough, October 2024.
685	J. W. Archer	1924	1950–1954	Amble	Sold July 1956. Renamed Brighter Hope (HL 44). In storage as J. W. Archer at TCC Plant, Middlesbrough, October 2024.
685	J. W. Archer	1924	1954–1956	Relief fleet	Sold July 1956. Renamed Brighter Hope (HL 44). In storage as J. W. Archer at TCC Plant, Middlesbrough, October 2024.
686	T. B. B. H.	1924	1924–1949	Portrush	(Note: Legacies of Mrs Thornton, Mr Bartlett, Miss Boustred and Miss Hooper, built by J. Samuel White of Cowes, with single 80-bhp White DE6 6-cyl. petrol engine, costing £7,435.); Sold January 1953. Renamed Moonraker, Hamptonian and Juno. Now as T. B. B. H. on the River Hamble, March 2025.
686	T. B. B. H.	1924	1949–1953	Relief fleet	Sold January 1953. Renamed Moonraker, Hamptonian and Juno. Now as T. B. B. H. on the River Hamble, March 2025.
687	B. A. S. P.	1924	1924–1934	Yarmouth	(Note: Legacies of Mr Richard Blackburn, Mrs Constance Armstrong, Mrs Marion Pender Smart and Mrs Henrietta Davidson Price, built by J. Samuel White of Cowes, with single 80-bhp White DE6 6-cyl. petrol engine, costing £7,519.); Sold February 1955. Renamed Valencia. On display since April 1996 as B. A. S. P. in the RNLI Heritage Collection at Chatham Historic Dockyard, December 2025.
687	B. A. S. P.	1924	1934–1940	Falmouth	Sold February 1955. Renamed Valencia. On display since April 1996 as B. A. S. P. in the RNLI Heritage Collection at Chatham Historic Dockyard, December 2025.
687	B. A. S. P.	1924	1940–1947	Relief fleet	Sold February 1955. Renamed Valencia. On display since April 1996 as B. A. S. P. in the RNLI Heritage Collection at Chatham Historic Dockyard, December 2025.
687	B. A. S. P.	1924	1947–1951	Valentia	Sold February 1955. Renamed Valencia. On display since April 1996 as B. A. S. P. in the RNLI Heritage Collection at Chatham Historic Dockyard, December 2025.
687	B. A. S. P.	1924	1951–1955	Relief fleet	Sold February 1955. Renamed Valencia. On display since April 1996 as B. A. S. P. in the RNLI Heritage Collection at Chatham Historic Dockyard, December 2025.
688	Grace Darling	1924	1924	British Empire Exhibition	(Note: Built by S. E. Saunders of Cowes, with single 80-bhp Weyburn DE6 6-cyl. petrol engine, costing £8,997.); Renamed The Lord Southborough (Civil Service No.1) after the exhibition.
688	The Lord Southborough (Civil Service No.1)	1924	1925–1951	Margate	(Note: Gift of the Civil Service LB fund, built by S. E. Saunders of Cowes, with single 80-bhp Weyburn DE6 6-cyl. petrol engine, costing £8,997.); Sold January 1955. A yacht in Cyrenaica in 1955. Last reported at Sholing, Southampton, November 2001.
688	The Lord Southborough (Civil Service No.1)	1924	1951–1955	Relief fleet	Sold January 1955. A yacht in Cyrenaica in 1955. Last reported at Sholing, Southampton, November 2001.
689	Manchester and Salford	1924	1924–1946	Douglas	(Note: Gift of the Manchester and Salford LB fund, built by S. E. Saunders of Cowes, with single 80-bhp Weyburn DE6 6-cyl. petrol engine, costing £8,456.); Sold October 1954. Renamed Alison Jane, later Jean Louise. Fully restored as Manchester and Salford at the Douglas Boatyard, Hesketh Bank, Lancashire, July 2025.
689	Manchester and Salford	1924	1946–1954	Relief fleet	Sold October 1954. Renamed Alison Jane, later Jean Louise. Fully restored as Manchester and Salford at the Douglas Boatyard, Hesketh Bank, Lancashire, July 2025.
690	C. and S.	1925	1925–1940	Dunmore East	(Note: Gift of Mr Coats and legacy of Mrs Smart, built by S. E. Saunders of Cowes, with single 80-bhp Weyburn DE6 6-cyl. petrol engine, costing £8,424.); Sold November 1947. Renamed Caradoc. Last reported at Victoria, British Columbia, 1985.
690	C. and S.	1925	1940–1943	Pwllheli	Sold November 1947. Renamed Caradoc. Last reported at Victoria, British Columbia, 1985.
690	C. and S.	1925	1943–1946	Relief fleet	Sold November 1947. Renamed Caradoc. Last reported at Victoria, British Columbia, 1985.
690	C. and S.	1925	1946–1947	Valentia	Sold November 1947. Renamed Caradoc. Last reported at Victoria, British Columbia, 1985.
692	Milburn	1925	1925–1946	Holy Island	(Note: Legacy of Sir Charles Milburn and a gift from Mr F. Milburn, built by S. E. Saunders of Cowes, with single 80-bhp Weyburn DE6 6-cyl. petrol engine, costing £8,449.); Sold September 1955. Renamed Asmara, later Rosanaed. Last reported at Denton Island, Newhaven, East Sussex, February 2020.
692	Milburn	1925	1946–1955	Relief fleet	Sold September 1955. Renamed Asmara, later Rosanaed. Last reported at Denton Island, Newhaven, East Sussex, February 2020.
694	H. F. Bailey	1924	1924–1928	Cromer No.1	(Note: Legacy of Mr H. F. Bailey, built by J. Samuel White of Cowes, with single 80-bhp White DE6 6-cyl. petrol engine, costing £7,530.); Renamed J. B. Proudfoot in 1936.
694	H. F. Bailey	1924	1929–1935	Cromer No.1	Renamed J. B. Proudfoot in 1936.
694	J. B. Proudfoot	1924	1935–1941	Relief fleet	(Note: Legacy of Miss F. B. Proudfoot.); Sold September 1956. Renamed Gramarie. Last reported on the hard at Marbella, Spain, June 2019.
694	J. B. Proudfoot	1924	1941–1945	Southend-on-Sea	Sold September 1956. Renamed Gramarie. Last reported on the hard at Marbella, Spain, June 2019.
694	J. B. Proudfoot	1924	1945–1947	Relief fleet	Sold September 1956. Renamed Gramarie. Last reported on the hard at Marbella, Spain, June 2019.
694	J. B. Proudfoot	1924	1947–1949	Dover	Sold September 1956. Renamed Gramarie. Last reported on the hard at Marbella, Spain, June 2019.
694	J. B. Proudfoot	1924	1949–1956	Relief fleet	Sold September 1956. Renamed Gramarie. Last reported on the hard at Marbella, Spain, June 2019.
695	Grace Darling	1925	1925	British Empire Exhibition	(Note: Built by J. Samuel White of Cowes, with single 80-bhp White DE6 6-cyl. petrol engine, costing £7,614.); Renamed M. O. Y. E. after the exhibition.
695	M. O. Y. E.	1925	1926–1949	Porthdinllaen	(Note: Legacies of Miss Manby, the Misses J. L. and J. C. Owen, Mr Yates and Mr Lloyd); Sold April 1956.
695	M. O. Y. E.	1925	1949–1956	Relief fleet	Sold April 1956.

== See also ==
- Watson-class lifeboat
- Royal National Lifeboat Institution lifeboats
