= Low Hauxley =

Village in Northumberland, England

Coordinates: 55.3184°N 1.5512°W

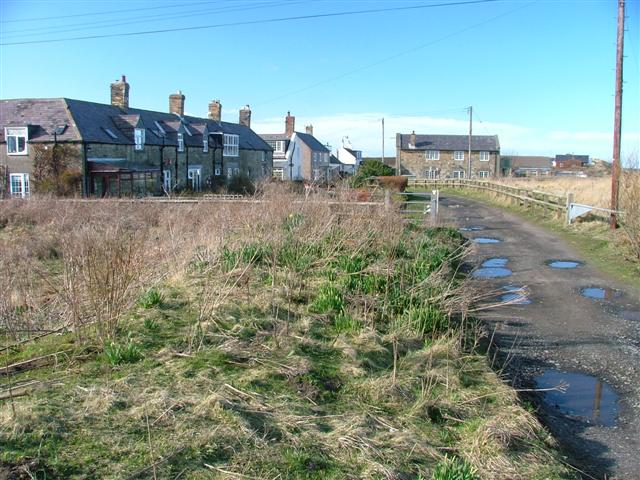
- Low Hauxley

- Location within Northumberland
- Population: 230 (2021)
- OS grid reference: NU267041
  - London: 270 mi (430 km)
- Civil parish: Hauxley
- Unitary authority: Northumberland
- Ceremonial county: Northumberland
- Region: North East
- Country: England
- Sovereign state: United Kingdom
- Post town: MORPETH
- Postcode district: NE65
- Dialling code: 01665
- Police: Northumbria
- Fire: Northumberland
- Ambulance: North East
- UK Parliament: Berwick-upon-Tweed

Low Hauxley is a small hamlet in Northumberland, in the former Alnwick district, less than 1 mile (1.6 km) from Amble and around 27 miles (43 km) from Newcastle-upon-Tyne. It is combined with High Hauxley to make the civil parish of Hauxley.

Near the village is an important archaeological site, with an early Bronze Age cemetery as well as Mesolithic and Iron Age remains, but with much erosion. A major rescue dig was mounted for 13 weeks, between June and September 2013. Results were broadcast on Channel 4's Time Team special on 2 March 2014. Earlier work by Archaeological Research Services Ltd in 2009 recovered flint tools from buried land surfaces beneath the Bronze Age burials.
