= RNLI New Holland TC45 launch tractor =

Tractor for launching small lifeboats

New Holland TC45
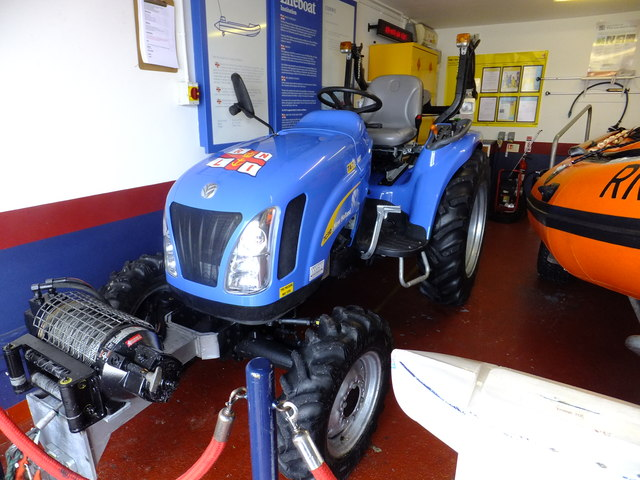
- New Holland TC45 RNLI Launch Vehicle
- Type: Launch vehicle
- Manufacturer: New Holland
- Length: 3.180 m (125.2 in)
- Width: 1.550 m (61.0 in)
- Height: 2.410 in (0.0612 m)
- Weight: 1,549 kg (3,415 lb)
- Propulsion: All Gear 4 wheel drive
- Engine model: Shibaura 2.2L 4-cyl diesel
- Gross power: 45 hp (34 kW)

The New Holland TC45 is a four-wheel drive compact tractor, adapted to suit the launch and recovery requirements for some of the RNLI's inflatable inshore lifeboats from beach and shore-based lifeboat stations.

== Specification ==
The RNLI engineering department in Poole worked with the tractor company New Holland to design a small launch tractor for stations which operate D-class inflatable lifeboats. The powerful small diesel engine gives out 45 hp (34 kW). The tractor is undersealed to resist a saline environment. The tractor is fitted with turf tyres, which function better on sand, as well as wooden and concrete slipways. The specification complies with DVLA legislation, allowing the tractor to be used on public highways.

== Tractor fleet ==
Op.No. (Note: Op. No. is the RNLI's Operational Number of the tractor.)	Type	Reg No.	Station	In service	Image	Payload	Comments
TA53	TC45D	EX52 WDT	Happisburgh; Relief fleet; Ilfracombe; Swanage	2002–2009; 2009–2011; 2011–2014; 2014–2017			
TA56	TC45D	WA03 EZB	Horton and Port Eynon; Happisburgh; Relief fleet	2002–2009; 2009–2022; 2022–2024			
TA57	TC45D	WA03 EZC	The Mumbles	2003–2014			
TA58	TC45D	WA03 EYZ	Littlehampton; Relief fleet; Appledore	2003–2017; 2017–2022; 2022–2025			
TA59	TC45D	WA03 HBF	St Ives; Penwith ASC; St Ives; Relief fleet	2003–2011; 2011–2013; 2013–2014; 2014–2015			
TA61	TC45D	NK53 DFJ	Anstruther; Relief fleet	2003–2020; 2000–2023			
TA64	TC45D	04-WD-1859	Tramore; Relief fleet; Training	2004–2010; 2010–2014; 2014–2015			
TA65	TC45S	NK54 EYT	Craster; Relief fleet; Bembridge	2005–2010; 2010–2011; 2011–2014			
TA68	TC45D	WA04 VYM	Trearddur Bay	2005–2022			
TA69	TC45D	05-D-72167	Achill Island	2005–		(BB-907)	
TA70	TC45D	05-D-72163	Aran Islands; Relief fleet; Clogherhead; Fenit	2006–2006; 2006–2013; 2013–2019; 2019–		D-class (IB1); Lizzie (D-860)	
TA71	TC45D	SN55 HNU	Aran Islands	2005–2023			
TA72	TC45D	SN55 HNV	Sunderland; Relief fleet; Craster; Relief fleet; Port Talbot	2005–2009; 2009–2010; 2010–2013; 2013–2015; 2015–2016			
TA73	TC45D	JJZ 9544	Newcastle; Relief fleet; Moelfre; Relief fleet; Port Talbot	2005–2012; 2012–2013; 2013–2014; 2014–2016; 2016–2023			
TA74	TC45DA	EU56 HDO	Clacton-on-Sea; Relief fleet; Happisburgh	2006–2024; 2024–2025; 2025–		D-class (IB1); Damar's Pride (D-849)	
TA81	TC45DA	EU57 RWX	Cromer; Relief fleet; Conwy	2008–2015; 2015–2021; 2021–2025			
TA82	TC45DA	SF08 UAG	Ilfracombe; Horton and Port Eynon; Relief fleet; Cromer; Relief fleet	2008–2009; 2009–2014; 2014–2015; 2015–2018; 2018–			

== See also ==
- Fowler Challenger III launch tractor
- Talus MB-764 launch tractor
- Talus MB-H launch tractor
- Talus MB-4H launch tractor
- Talus Atlantic 85 DO-DO launch carriage
