= Bude Lifeboat Station =

RNLI lifeboat Station in Cornwall, England

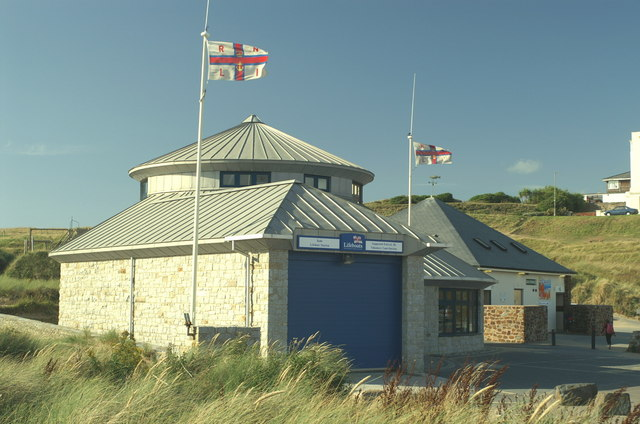
- Bude Lifeboat Station in 2005

- Location within Cornwall
- Former names: Bude Haven Lifeboat Station

General information
- Type: Lifeboat station
- Location: Car Park, Summerleaze Beach, Bude, Cornwall, EX23 8HN, United Kingdom
- Coordinates: 50.83071°N 4.55012°W
- Opened: 1837–1852 Local committee; 1853–1923 RNIPLS; 1966– RNLI ILB
- Owner: Royal National Lifeboat Institution

Website
- rnli.org/find-my-nearest/lifeboat-stations/bude-lifeboat-station

Bude Lifeboat Station sits at the end of Summerleaze Beach car park in Bude, a seaside resort at the mouth of the River Strat, on the north-west coast of Cornwall, England.

A lifeboat station was first established at Bude by local committee in 1837. The station was re-established by the Royal National Institution for the Preservation of Life from Shipwreck (RNLIPLS) in 1853, operating until its closure in 1923. The station was re-opened as an Inshore lifeboat station in 1966.

The station currently operates a D-class (IB1) Inshore lifeboat (ILB), Barbara Anne Bennett (D-826), on station since 2024, first as a relief lifeboat, but now the permanent lifeboat.

== History ==
On 28 October 1836, the ship Progress was driven ashore at Bude, but all the crew were rescued. The following day, the vessel Providence foundered between Bude and Boscastle, with the loss of all hands. The attention of King William IV was drawn to the events, and he ordered money to be given from Duchy of Cornwall funds, for the provision of a lifeboat at Bude. Under the guidance of the RNIPLS, a boat costing £100 was built by Wake of Sunderland, and placed on service in 1837, operated by a local independent association. The lifeboat was known as the Royal Bude Lifeboat.

Whilst on exercise on 10 October 1844, the lifeboat capsized, and two of the crew, N. Bradden and W. Skitch, were drowned.

The following year, on 25–26 January 1845, three boatmen of HM Coastguard used the Dennett Rocket apparatus to save three men from the schooner Margaret, wrecked at Widemouth Bay, whilst on passage from Cork to Porthcawl. The three boatmen were each awarded the RNIPLS Silver Medal.

By 1848, the lifeboat was in poor repair, and in edition No. 1 of the RNIPLS journal "The Life-boat" in 1852, it was reported that there was a very inefficient lifeboat at Bude. A branch committee of local gentlemen and coastguard officers was formed. A new 30 ft (9.1 m) lifeboat was ordered from Wallis of Blackwall, London in 1852, but it ended up being placed at Appledore. A 27 ft 0 in (8.23 m) Peake-class self-righting 'Pulling and Sailing' (P&S) lifeboat, one with sails and (eight) oars, was subsequently constructed by Forrestt, at a cost of £135, and placed at Bude in 1853. The station was known as Bude Haven Lifeboat Station. The following year, the RNIPLs became the Royal National Lifeboat Institution (RNLI).

At the meeting of the RNLI committee of management on Thursday 6 November 1862, a letter of 30 October 1862 was read, from the chairman of the Bude Haven branch. He reported that the Bude Haven lifeboat had failed to reach the East Indiaman Bencoolen, wrecked at Bude on 21 October 1862, whilst on passage from Liverpool to Bombay. Just six of the 33 crew survived, after drifting ashore on a raft. Also considering the report of the assistant Inspector of Lifeboats of 3 November, following his subsequent visit to Bude, it was decided to place a larger 33 ft (10 m) 10-oared lifeboat at Bude Haven, and it was ordered that a new boathouse be constructed on another site.

The new 33 ft (10 m) lifeboat in memory of Elizabeth Moore Garden, wife of the late Robert Theophilus Garden, was funded by their children, and was constructed by Forrestt at a cost of £200. Along with its carriage, it was transported from London to Bideford free of charge by the South Western and North Devon railway companies. From there it was drawn on its carriage to Bude, and launched for the first time on 19 June, the birthday of Elizabeth Garden.

A fine stone built boathouse, designed by the honorary architect to the Institution C. H. Cooke FRIBA, and costing £292, was constructed on the west bank of the Bude Canal, (50°49′35.7″N 4°32′49.0″W), and an inscription carved in Aubigny stone was placed over the large doorway.

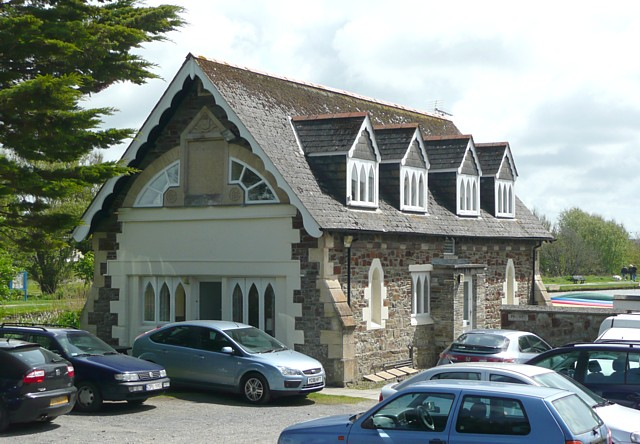
1863 Bude Haven Lifeboat House, pictured in 2009

In Memory
of
ELIZABETH MOORE GARDEN
The beloved wife of the late
ROBERT THEOPHILUS GARDEN, Esq.
of
River Lyons, King's County, Ireland
and
One of the Lords of the Manor of Treleigh
Redruth, Cornwall

This Lifeboat Establishment
was presented to the
ROYAL NATIONAL LIFEBOAT INSTITUTION
by their surviving children
19 June A.D. 1863

"The Lord on high is mightier than the noise of many waters,
Yea, Than the mighty waves of the Sea" —Psalm xciii. ver.4.

The Lease of the piece of ground on which this Boat-House
has been erected was presented to the
ROYAL NATIONAL LIFEBOAT INSTITUTION
By SIR THOMAS DYKE ACKLAND, Bart.
1863
C. H. COOKE, F.R.I.B.A.,Hon. Architect.

From the RNLI Annual Report of 1872 and onwards, the station became known as Bude Lifeboat Station.

On 3 March 1877, the lifeboat was launched to he assistance of the schooner Elizabeth Scown, which hit the Bude breakwater whilst carrying a cargo of stone for church restoration, The crew survived, but after the lifeboat earlier failed to get close, it capsized, and coxswain James Maynard was lost. The committee of management voted £150 to his dependants.

Elizabeth Moore Garden served at Bude until 1886, recording 17 launches, and 20 lives saved. She would be replaced by two further boats, both carrying the same name. Over the next 37 years, they would come to be launched 22 times, saving a further 20 lives.

At a ceremony on 18 August 1922, a new motor-powered lifeboat was placed at Appledore. In his speech to the assembled crowd, president of the branch Rev. J. B. White acknowledged that a motor lifeboat brought extra responsibility, and they would have to travel greater distances, and work in cooperation with other stations with motor lifeboats, such as Padstow.

Bude Lifeboat Station, sitting between the two stations of Appledore and Padstow, was closed in 1923. The lifeboat on station at the time of closure, Elizabeth Moore Garden (ON 616), was transferred to North Berwick. The boathouse is now a private residence.

== 1966 onwards ==
In 1964, in response to an increasing amount of water-based leisure activity, the RNLI placed 25 small fast Inshore lifeboats around the country. These were easily launched with just a few people, ideal to respond quickly to local emergencies.

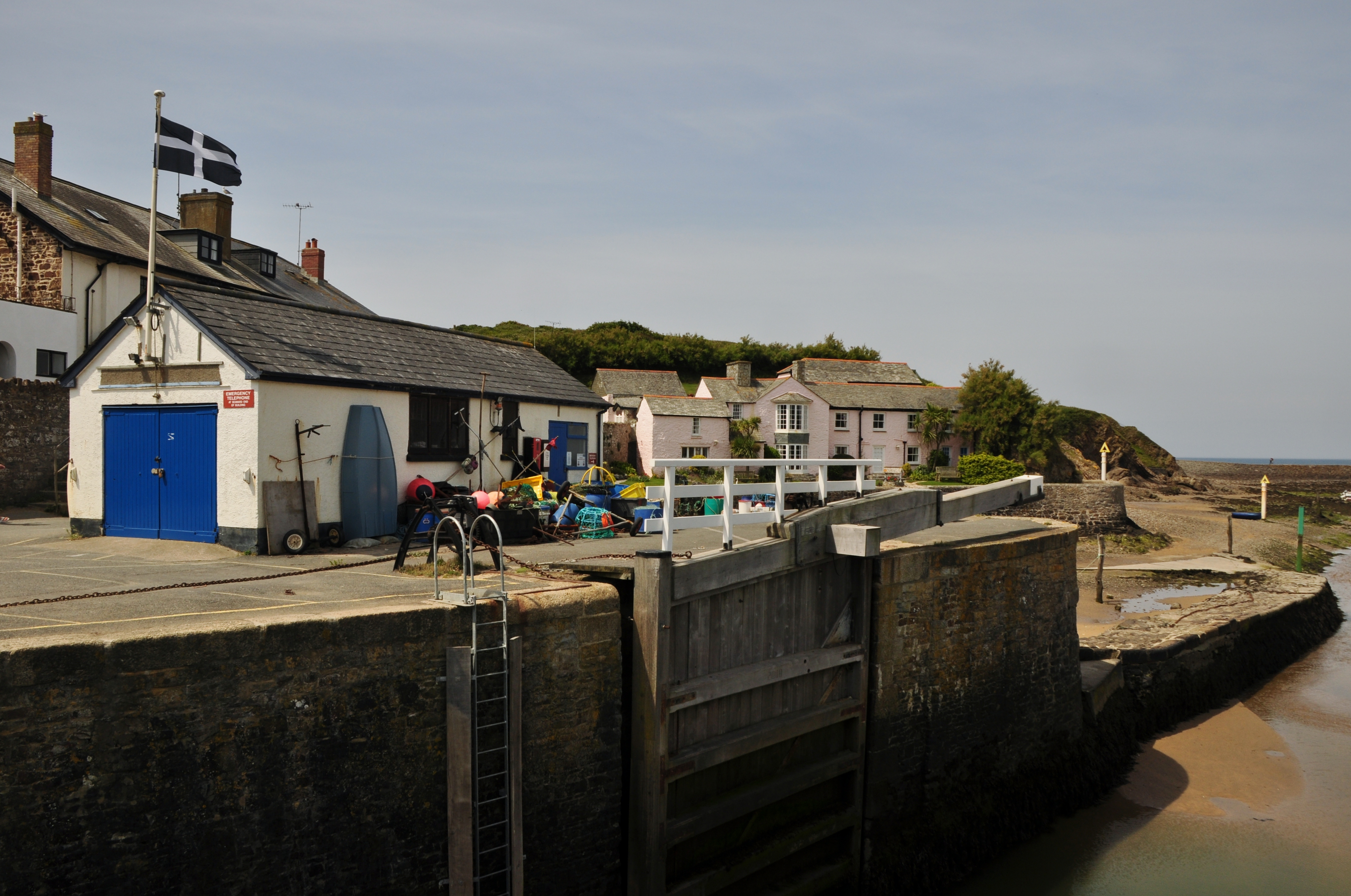
Former Inshore lifeboat house, Bude

As more lifeboats were deployed, many of the older closed stations were re-established. A D-class (RFD PB16) lifeboat (D-96) was placed at Bude in May 1966. The lifeboat was housed in a boathouse next to the canal sea lock on the south pier, (50°49′45.8″N 4°33′07.4″W), from where it was launched across the beach.

In 1992, senior Helm, and later deputy Launch Authority, Jonathan Ball was awarded the MBE for services to architecture. A co-founder of the Eden Project, his architecture practice have won eight national and seven regional design awards, for projects including lifeboat stations at Rock, Clovelly and Lyme Regis.

Trials took place to evaluate launching the lifeboat from a new site at Summerleaze Beach in 2000. These proved successful, with D-495 relocated to the new site, and a second lifeboat from the relief fleet placed at the old boathouse. A new station and boathouse were constructed at Summerleaze Beach, completed in 2002, at a cost of £516,000.

At a meeting of the RNLI trustees in 2008, it was resolved that Bude would be re-designated as an all-year-round station, with an additional Rescue Water Craft, or Jetski, provided during the winter months.

In April 2026, trials were carried out, to assess the suitability of operating the larger twin-engine B-class (Atlantic 85) RIB at Bude.

== Awards ==
Chief boatman William Henry Tregidgo of HM Coastguard, Bude, was awarded the RNIPLS Silver Medal, after commanding the Bude lifeboat during the rescue of two men from the smack of Bideford on 9 October 1853.

Coxswain James Maynard was awarded a gold medal by the Spanish government after rescuing the crew of the brig Juanita, of Bilbao, which ran aground north of Bude in 1865. In 1880, Coxswain Thomas Bate led the rescue of three people from the ketch Stucley, wrecked on Bude breakwater, for which he received the RNLI Silver Medal.

Members of the Bude ILB crew have been recognised for their bravery several times. The 'Thanks of the Institution inscribed on Vellum' was presented for rescues in 1993 and 1996, and a 'A Framed Letter of Thanks signed by the Chairman of the Institution' were given to crew members after both these rescues and another in 1991.

The following are awards made at Bude:

- Gold Medal, awarded by the Spanish Government
  James Maynard, Coxswain – 1865
- Sabre of Honour, awarded by The Queen of Spain
  Mr Simpson, Coastguard Officer – 1865
- RNIPLS Silver Medal
  Simon Bolitho, Boatman, HM Coastguard, Bude – 1845
  Thomas Paul, Boatman, HM Coastguard, Bude – 1845
  James Perkins, Boatman, HM Coastguard, Bude – 1845
  William Henry Tregidgo, Chief Boatman, HM Coastguard, Bude – 1853
- RNLI Silver Medal
  John Dyer – 1860
  Thomas Bate, Coxswain – 1881
- 'The Thanks of the Institution inscribed on Vellum'
  George Tickell of HMS Defence – 1881
  Michael Sims, Helm – 1993
  Bude Lifeboat Station – 1996
- 'A Framed Letter of Thanks signed by the Chairman of the Institution'
  Simon Chadwick, crew member – 1991
  James Wade, crew member – 1993
  Keith West, crew member – 1993
  Gary Parkinson, crew member – 1996
- Resuscitation Certificate, awarded by the Royal Humane Society
  M. Moyle – 1966
  A. J. Lovejoy – 1966
- Member, Order of the British Empire (MBE)
  Jonathan Macartney Ball – 1992QBH

== Roll of honour ==
In memory of those lost whilst serving at Bude.

- Lost when the lifeboat Royal Bude Lifeboat capsized, 10 October 1844
  N. Bradden, crew member
  W. Skitch, crew member
- Lost when the lifeboat Elizabeth Moore Garden capsized, returning from the schooner Elizabeth Scown, 3 March 1877.
  James Maynard, Coxswain (40)

== Bude lifeboats ==
=== Pulling and Sailing (P&S) lifeboats ===
On station	ON (Note: ON is the RNLI's Official Number of the boat.)	Name	Built	Class	Comments
1837–c.1852	–	Royal Bude Lifeboat	1837	24-foot North Country	(Note: 24 ft 9 in (7.54 m) x 8 ft 3 in (2.51 m) (6/8-oared) North Country non-self-righting lifeboat, funded by the Duchy of Cornwall, built by Wake of Sunderland, costing £100.); Lifeboat presented by King William IV. Capsized 10 October 1844.
Station Closed 1852–1853
1853–1863	Pre-264	Unnamed	1853	27-foot Peake self-righting (P&S)	(Note: 27 ft 0 in (8.23 m) x 7 ft 6 in (2.29 m) (8-oared) Peake-class self-righting (P&S) lifeboat, funded by the RNIPLS, built by Forrestt of Limehouse, London, costing £135.); Sold in 1863.
1863–1886	Pre-401	Elizabeth Moore Garden	1863	33-foot Peake self-righting (P&S)	(Note: 33 ft 0 in (10.06 m) x 8 ft 0 in (2.44 m) (10-oared) Peake-class self-righting (P&S) lifeboat, gift of the family of the late Mr R. T. Garden of London, built by Forrestt of Limehouse, London, costing £200.); Sold in 1892.
1886–1911	52	Elizabeth Moore Garden	1885	34-foot self-righting (P&S)	(Note: 34 ft 0 in (10.36 m) x 8 ft 0 in (2.44 m) (10-oared) self-righting (P&S) lifeboat, gift of the family of the late Mr R. T. Garden of London, built by Woolfe of Shadwell, London, costing £345.); Sold in January 1912.
1911–1923	616	Elizabeth Moore Garden	1911	35-foot Rubie self-righting (P&S)	(Note: 35 ft 0 in (10.67 m) x 8 ft 10 in (2.69 m) (10-oared) Rubie-class self-righting (P&S) lifeboat, gift of the family of the late Mr R. T. Garden of London, built by Thames Ironworks of Blackwall, London, costing £1,051.); Transferred to North Berwick.

Station closed in 1923.
Pre ON numbers are unofficial numbers used by the Lifeboat Enthusiasts' Society to reference early lifeboats not included on the official RNLI list.

=== Inshore lifeboats ===
==== D class ====
On station	Op.No. (Note: Op.No. is the RNLI's Operational Number of the boat carried on the hull.)	Name	Class	Comments
1966–1975	D-96	Unnamed	D-class (RFD PB16)	
1975–1987	D-232	Unnamed	D-class (Zodiac III)	
1987–1995	D-343	Unnamed	D-class (EA16)	Transferred to the ILC
1996–2003	D-495	Elsie Frances II	D-class (EA16)	Transferred to Burnham-on-Sea.
2003–2004	D-422	Alec Dykes	D-class (EA16)	Previously at Ilfracombe from 1992.
2004–2012	D-617	Henry Phillip	D-class (IB1)	
2012–2024	D-756	George Bird	D-class (IB1)	
2024	D-888	Ronald and Marjorie Stanley Taylor	D-class (IB1)	Returned to ILC with build issues. Later assigned to the relief fleet.
2024–	D-826	Barbara Anne Bennett	D-class (IB1)	First deployed in the relief fleet in 2019. Placed at Bude as a relief lifeboat in 2024, but made permanent in 2025.

=== Launch and recovery tractors ===
On station	Op.No.	Reg. No.	Type	Comments
1921–1923	T8	AF 4256	Clayton RNLI tractor	
<1993–1997	TA10	B571 TFJ	Ford 5610	
1997–2001	TA33	D927 OTT	Ford 5610	
2001–2002	TA42	E726 MBX	Ford 5610	
2002–2004	TA41	L216 VCV	Ford 5030 4WD	
2004–2007	TW06	VRU 611S	Talus MB-764 County	
2007–2012	ST03	WA54 KUX	Softrak LogLogic (Mk.1)	
2012–2016	TT07	WA61 HZH	Tooltrack LogLogic	
2016–2017	ST02	WA54 HRP	Softrak Loglogic (Mk.1)	
2017–2022	ST06	WA58 NYL	Softrak Loglogic (Mk.1)	
2022–	ST07	GX71 EAY	Softrak LogLogic (Mk.3)	

== See also ==
- List of RNLI stations
- List of former RNLI stations
- Royal National Lifeboat Institution lifeboats
