= Borth Lifeboat Station =

RNLI lifeboat station in Ceredigion, Wales

- Gorsaf Bad Achub Y Borth

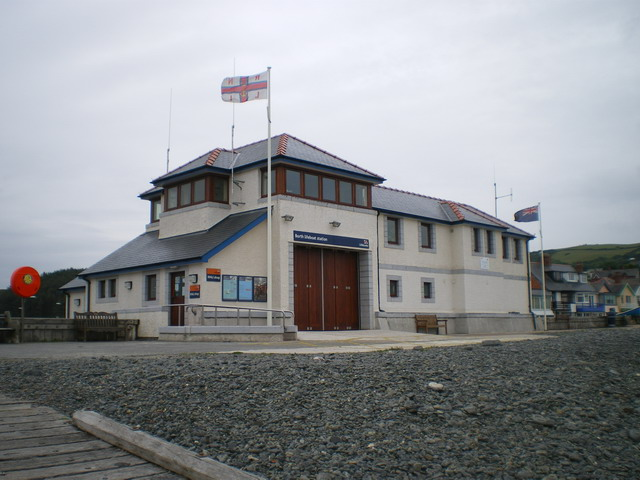
- Borth Lifeboat Station

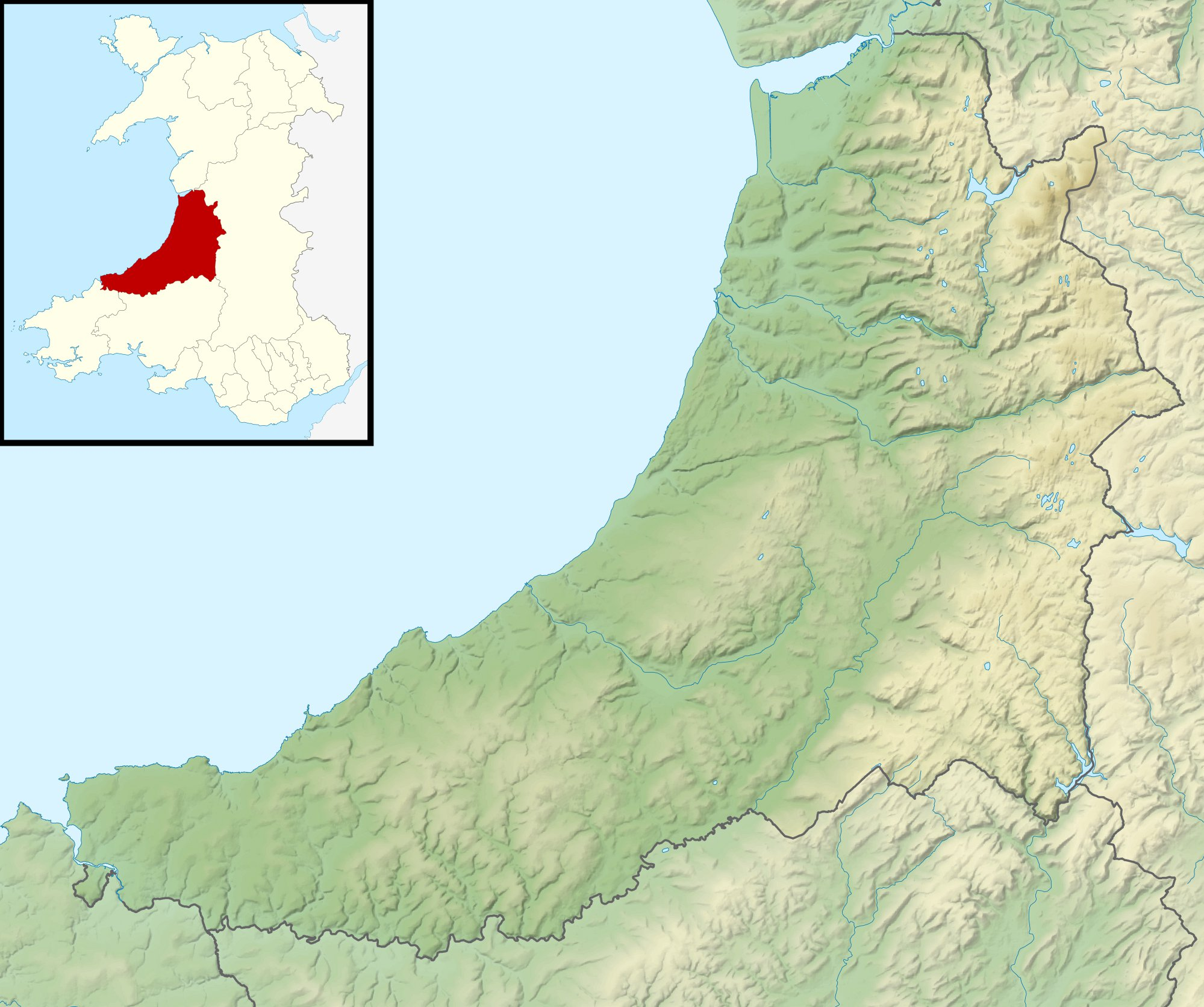
- Location within Ceredigion

General information
- Type: RNLI Lifeboat Station
- Location: 1874 High St, Borth, Ceredigion, Wales, SY24 5LJ, United Kingdom
- Coordinates: 52°28′52″N 4°03′05″W
- Opened: 1966
- Owner: Royal National Lifeboat Institution

Website
- Borth RNLI Lifeboat Station

Borth Lifeboat Station (Welsh: Gorsaf Bad Achub Y Borth) is located on High Street in Borth, a village 7 miles (11 km) north of Aberystwyth, overlooking Cardigan Bay, in the county of Ceredigion.

A lifeboat station was established at Borth by the Royal National Lifeboat Institution (RNLI) in June 1966.

The station currently operates a D-class (IB1) Inshore lifeboat, Annie Lizzie (D-893), on station since 2024.

== History ==
A private lifeboat operated at Borth between 1830 and 1850. No further details are available.

In 1964, in response to an increasing amount of water-based leisure activity, the RNLI placed 25 small fast Inshore lifeboats around the country. These were easily launched with just a few people, ideal to respond quickly to local emergencies.

More stations were opened in the following years, and a new station was opened at Borth in June 1966. The choice of Borth as a location for a lifeboat is accredited to the campaigning of two local men, councillor Gethin Evans, and WWII veteran Aran Morris MBE, who said that his memories of Arctic convoys of World War II inspired him to press for the lifeboat station, because it used to take rescuers 20 minutes to get to Borth from Aberystwyth and Aberdyfi during an emergency.

A new station boathouse was constructed in 1987, to replace the original wooden Hardun type boathouse. This provided better storage areas for the boat and equipment, new crew facilities, and a souvenir shop.

On 10 December 2000, the Borth D-class (EA16) lifeboat May (D-479) was returning from exercise, when they were called to assist in the rescue of the Helm of the Aberdovey B-class (Atlantic 75), who had been thrown overboard during their exercise session. The man had been swept into shallower water, which could not be accessed by the larger Atlantic 75. The Borth lifeboat set out on the 3 mi (4.8 km) journey, with Helm Amos Bewick delivering an outstanding job of keeping the small Inshore boat steady in now worsening conditions, arriving on scene in 20 minutes. After 10 minutes searching, the crew man was found, and brought aboard the Borth lifeboat, the other two crew members of the D-class, Martyn Davies and Alex Shepard, needing all their effort to keep the small inshore boat from capsizing in the large waves. Returning to Aberdovey, the crewman was airlifted to hospital. For his skills and seamanship, Helm Amos Bewick was awarded the RNLI Bronze Medal, with Medal Service Certificates awarded to Davies and Shepard.

Thomas Aran Morris, Vice-President of Borth Lifeboat Station, was awarded the MBE in 2008. Amos Bewick was awarded with a certificate in 2018, to acknowledge his 21 years of outstanding service with Borth Lifeboat.

== Station honours ==
The following are awards made to the crew of Borth Lifeboat Station

- RNLI Bronze Medal
  Amos Bewick, Helm – 2001
- Medal Service Certificates and badges
  Martyn Davies, crew member – 2001
  Alex Shepard, crew member – 2001
- The Thanks of the Institution inscribed on Vellum
  Ronald Davies, Helm – 1978
  Ronald Davies, Helm – 1987
- Vellum Service Certificates
  Dilwyn Owen, crew member – 1987
  Richard Jeremy, crew member – 1987
- Framed Letter of Thanks signed by the Chairman of the Institution
  Louis Paul De La Haye, crew member – 1987
  Andrew William Doyle, crew member – 1987
  Richard Jenkins, crew member – 1998
- Member, Order of the British Empire (MBE)
  Ronald James Davies, Lifeboat Operations Manager – 2004QBH
  Thomas Aran Morris, Vice-President, Borth Lifeboat Station – 2008NYH

== Borth lifeboats ==
=== D class ===
Op.No. (Note: Op. No. is the RNLI's Operational Number of the boat or vehicle carried on the hull.)	Name	On station	Class	Comments
D-103	Unnamed	1966–1975	D-class (RFD PB16)	
D-233	Onslaught	1976–1987	D-class (Zodiac III)	
D-344	Onslaught	1987–1995	D-class (EA16)	
D-479	May	1995–2004	D-class (EA16)	
D-622	May II	2004–2013	D-class (IB1)	
D-760	Geoffrey Scott	2013–2024	D-class (IB1)	
D-893	Annie Lizzie	2024–	D-class (IB1)	

=== Launch and recovery tractors ===
Op.No.	Reg. No.	Type	On station	Comments
TA78	CU07 EUP	New Holland TC31	2007–2012	
TA110	SF10 FDA	New Holland B2045	2012–2013	
TA105	SF60 FCA	New Holland B3045	2013–2023	
TA91	WA09 MWU	New Holland B3045	2023–	

== See also ==
- List of RNLI stations
- List of former RNLI stations
- Royal National Lifeboat Institution lifeboats
