= Conwy Lifeboat Station =

Lifeboat station in Conwy County Borough, Wales

- Gorsaf Bad Achub Conwy

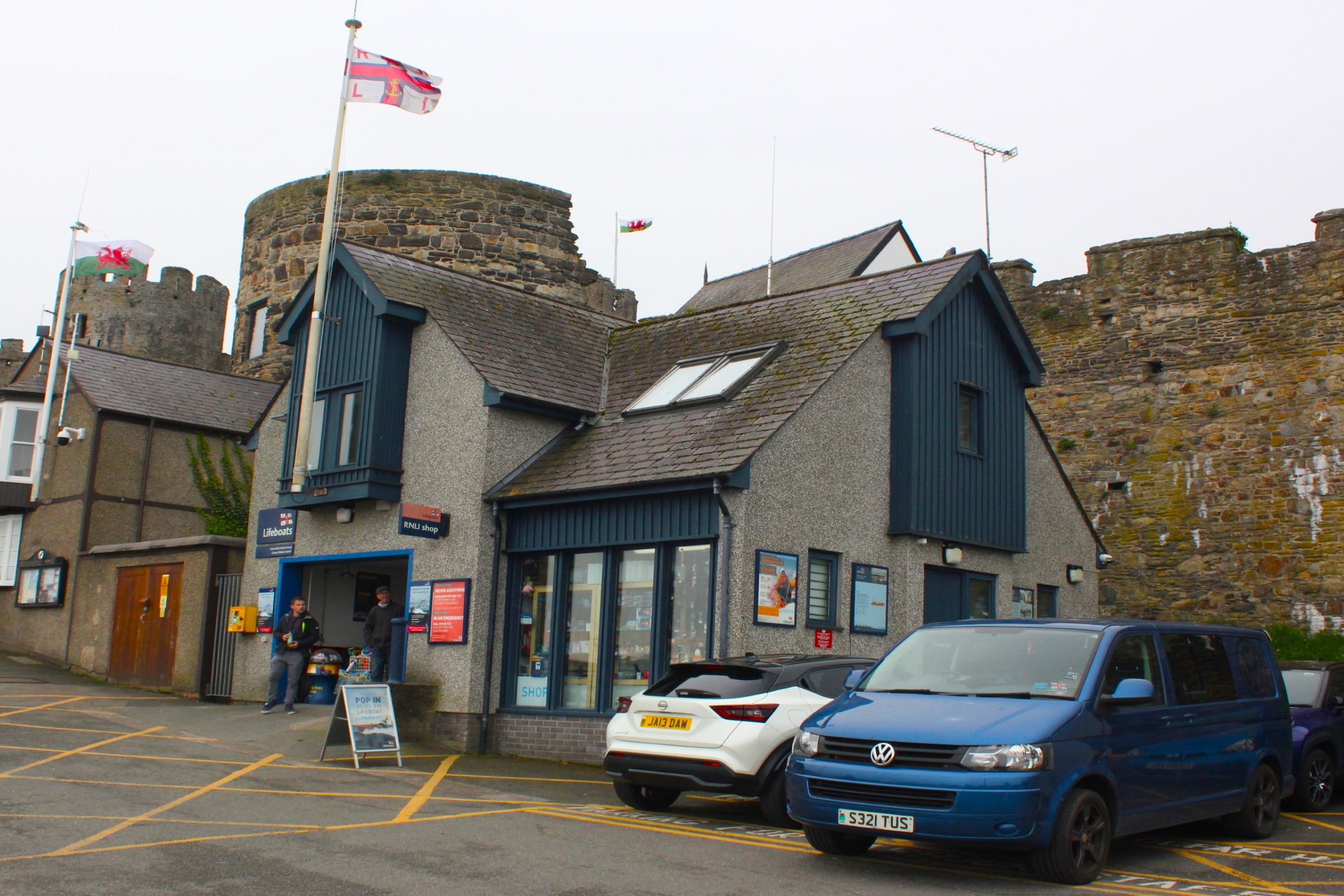
- Conwy Lifeboat Station in 2025

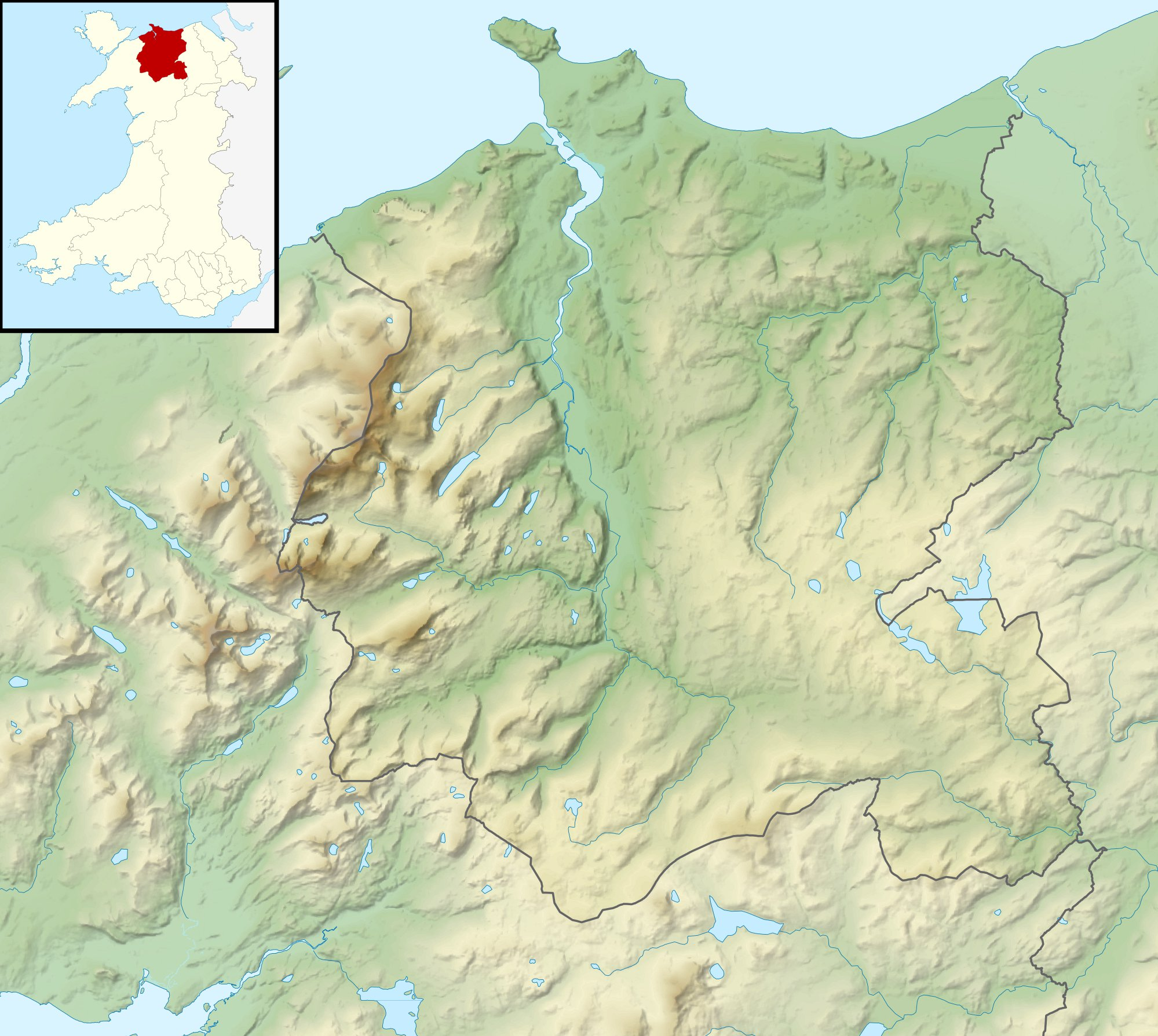
- Location within Conwy

General information
- Type: RNLI Lifeboat Station
- Location: Lower Gate Street, Conwy, Conwy County Borough, LL32 8BB, Wales
- Coordinates: 53°16′51.4″N 3°49′34.8″W
- Opened: May 1966
- Owner: Royal National Lifeboat Institution

Website
- Conwy RNLI Lifeboat Station

Conwy Lifeboat Station (Welsh: Gorsaf Bad Achub Conwy) is located in the shadow of Conwy Castle, on Lower Gate Street in Conwy, a town situated on the west bank of the River Conwy, on the North Wales coast.

An Inshore lifeboat was first stationed in Conwy by the Royal National Lifeboat Institution (RNLI) in 1966.

The station currently operates a D-class (IB1) Inshore lifeboat, Enid and John Hislop (D-898), on station since February 2025.

== History ==
In 1964, in response to an increasing amount of water-based leisure activity, the RNLI placed 25 small fast Inshore lifeboats around the country. These were easily launched with just a few people, ideal to respond quickly to local emergencies.

More stations were opened, and in May 1966, a lifeboat station was established at Conwy, with the arrival of a D-class (RFD PB16) Inshore lifeboat, the unnamed (D-97).

On the afternoon of 30 August 1970, the Conwy Inshore lifeboat (D-97) was launched into a force six-to-eight gale. On board were Brian Jones, Ronald Craven and Trevor Jones. Two men were rescued from the cabin cruiser Fulmar, which was in difficulties 1 mi (1.6 km) west of West Shore, Llandudno. Shortly after the men were retrieved to the lifeboat, the Fulmer was wrecked and broke up on the rocks. The three lifeboat crew were each awarded 'The Thanks of the Institution inscribed on Vellum' for their service.

On the 14 April 1985, construction began of a new boathouse and station building for Conwy lifeboat. The station, on Lower Gate Street, which provided storage, much improved crew facilities, and a retail outlet, was formally opened by Mayor of Conwy Capt. S. R. Roberts, TD, on 29 July 1985.

At a naming ceremony on 9 September 1995 in Conwy harbour, Miss Joan Bate, sister of the late Mr Arthur Bate, named the new Conwy lifeboat in honour of its donor, whose legacy had funded the lifeboat. The D-class (EA16) Inshore Lifeboat Arthur Bate (D-482) was formally accepted by Lt. Cdr. Brian Miles, director, on behalf of the RNLI, and handed over to the care of Conwy Lifeboat Station.

After serving for nine years, the Arthur Bate was retired, and replaced with another lifeboat funded from the same legacy. Arthur Bate II (D-627) was a new type D-class (IB1), and arrived on service in 2004.

Conwy Lifeboat Station celebrated their 50th Anniversary on 18 Jun 2016. Key to the celebrations was Lifeboat Operations Manager Trever Jones, who joined the station when it first opened in 1966, aged 22.

In 2025, Conwy welcomed their latest Inshore lifeboat, the eighth to serve at Conwy. At a ceremony on Saturday 11 April 2026, the D-class (IB1) Inshore lifeboat was formally named Enid and John Hislop (D-898) after the donor and benefactor.

== Station honours ==
The following are awards made at Conwy:

- 'The Thanks of the Institution inscribed on Vellum'
  Brian Jones – 1970
  Ronald Craven – 1970
  Trevor Jones – 1970

== Conwy lifeboats ==
=== Inshore lifeboats ===
Op.No. (Note: Op.No. is the RNLI's Operational Number carried on the hull or vehicle.)	Name	On Station	Class	Comments
D-97	Unnamed	1966–1971	D-class (RFD PB16)	
D-205	Unnamed	1971–1976	D-class (Zodiac III)	
D-239	Unnamed	1976–1987	D-class (Zodiac III)	
D-346	Unnamed	1987–1995	D-class (EA16)	
D-482	Arthur Bate	1995–2004	D-class (EA16)	
D-627	Arthur Bate II	2004–2014	D-class (IB1)	
D-765	The May-Bob	2014–2025	D-class (IB1)	
D-898	Enid and John Hislop	2025–	D-class (IB1)	

== See also ==
- List of RNLI stations
- List of former RNLI stations
- Royal National Lifeboat Institution lifeboats
