= Rock Lifeboat Station =

RNLI lifeboat station in Cornwall, England

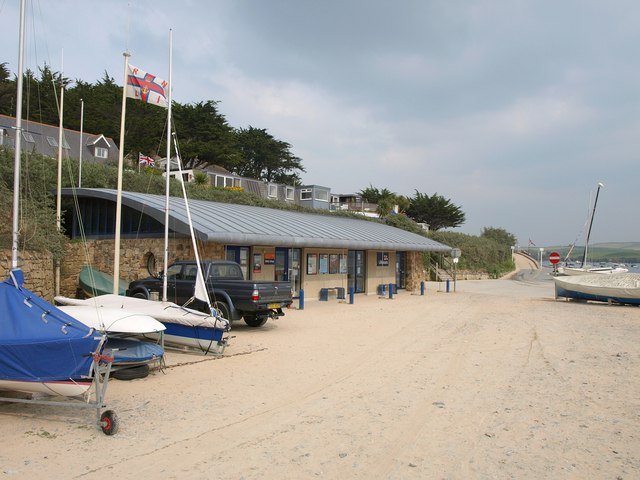
- Rock Lifeboat Station in 2011

- Location within Cornwall

General information
- Type: Lifeboat station
- Location: Ferry Point,, Rock, Cornwall, Cornwall, PL27 6LD, United Kingdom
- Coordinates: 50.544583°N 4.924583°W
- Opened: 1994; 32 years ago
- Owner: Royal National Lifeboat Institution

Website
- Rock RNLI Lifeboat Station

Rock Lifeboat Station sits on the northern shore of the River Camel at Ferry Point in Rock, (Cornish: Pennmeyn), a fishing village overlooking Padstow on the southern shore, on the north-west coast of the county of Cornwall, England.

A lifeboat station was established at Rock in 1994 by the Royal National Lifeboat Institution (RNLI).

The station currently operates a D-class (IB1) Inshore lifeboat, PJS (D-905), on station since 2025.

== History ==
Padstow Lifeboat Station was established on the river Camel estuary at Padstow in 1827, operating from Hawkers Cove from 1829. A second station was established at Padstow Harbour in 1899, but by 1962, silting of the river forced the closure of the station at Hawker's Cove. In 1967, Padstow lifeboat station was relocated out of the estuary to Trevose Head, 5 miles (8.0 km) to the west of Padstow.

Without a lifeboat on the estuary, any casualties here tended to be dealt with by local boats, including the Harlyn Rescue Service, which operated until 1989. In 1993, the Padstow Harbour Commissioners asked the RNLI if they could provide an Inshore lifeboat. At a meeting of the RNLI committee of management in November 1993, and with consideration that the All-weather lifeboat station was geographically close, but outside the Doom Bar at the entrance to the shallow river Camel, it was agreed to place a D-class Inshore lifeboat on the estuary, on evaluation for one season.

A D-class (EA16) Inshore lifeboat (D-350) from the relief fleet arrived on 4 March 1994, operating from a temporary boathouse on the east side of the estuary at Rock from 26 March 1994. Trials proved successful and it was decided to make the station permanent on 11 April 1995. The station received its permanent lifeboat, Dolly Holloway (D-489) on 27 September 1995.

Work started on a permanent lifeboat station in 1996, with the construction of a single-storey building, with an asymmetrical, curved, overhanging roof, to house both the lifeboat and launch vehicle, and provide crew facilities, along with a fundraising souvenir outlet. The building was completed in June 1997.

During its first 11 years, the lifeboat at Rock was launched 220 times and saved 80 lives. In 2005, Rock received a new class of Inshore lifeboat, the D-class (IB1). It was named Rusper (D-634), provided by the fundraising efforts of the branch of the Institution in Rusper, West Sussex.

After a young girl became trapped inside a cave by the rising tide and surf on 23 July 2012, a challenging rescue was completed by Helm Ciaran Bligh and crew member Sam Bishop. Each received 'A Framed Letter of Thanks signed by the Chairman of the Institution'.

On 5 May 2013, two members of a family were killed, and other received life-changing injuries, when they were thrown out of their speedboat Milly near Tregirls beach. A kill-cord had not been worn, and the unoccupied boat continued to circle at speed, hitting the six family members. The runaway boat was brought under control by water skiing instructor Charlie Toogood, who leapt from his own boat into the craft to turn off its engine. Kayaker and off-duty RNLI Casualty Care Trainer Leigh Anderson was accorded 'The Thanks of the Institution inscribed on Vellum', for attending to casualties. The station as a whole received 'A Framed Letter of Thanks from the Chairman of the Institution', for their part in the same incident, and Leigh's partner Charlie Gay was similarly awarded, for his assistance on the day.

The newest lifeboat at Rock arrived on 29 July 2025. The lifeboat was funded entirely by Peter Sobey of Liskeard. At a ceremony on Saturday 4 October 2025, the lifeboat was accepted on behalf of the RNLI, by RNLI vice president Mark Dowie, who in turn presented the boat to the care of the Rock branch of the Institution. After a service of dedication by the Rev. Craig Marshall of St Minver, the new lifeboat was named PJS (D-905), and then demonstrated to the assembled crowd by RNLI volunteers Charlie Toogood, Dan Bosley and Matt Marshall. The boat replaced Rusper II, the second lifeboat provided by the branch at Rusper, West Sussex, which had been on station since 2014.

== Station honours ==
The following are awards made at Rock:

- 'The Thanks of the Institution inscribed on Vellum'
  Leigh Anderson, Casualty Care Trainer – 2013
- 'A Framed Letter of Thanks signed by the Chairman of the Institution'
  Ciaran Bligh, Helm – 2012
  Sam Bishop, crew member – 2012
  Charlie Gay – 2013
  Rock Lifeboat Station – 2013

== Rock lifeboats ==
=== D class ===
On station	Op.No. (Note: Op.No. is the RNLI's Operational Number of the boat carried on the hull.)	Name	Class	Comments
1994–1995	D-350	Unnamed	D-class (EA16)	First deployed in the relief fleet in 1994
1995–2005	D-489	Dolly Holloway	D-class (EA16)	
2005–2014	D-634	Rusper	D-class (IB1)	
2014–2025	D-772	Rusper II	D-class (IB1)	
2025–	D-905	PJS	D-class (IB1)	

=== Launch and recovery tractors ===
On station	Op. No.	Reg. No.	Type	Comments
2005–	TA67	WK05 EAY	New Holland TC27D	

== See also ==
- List of RNLI stations
- List of former RNLI stations
- Royal National Lifeboat Institution lifeboats
