= Ilfracombe Lifeboat Station =

RNLI lifeboat station in Devon, England

- Flag of the RNLI

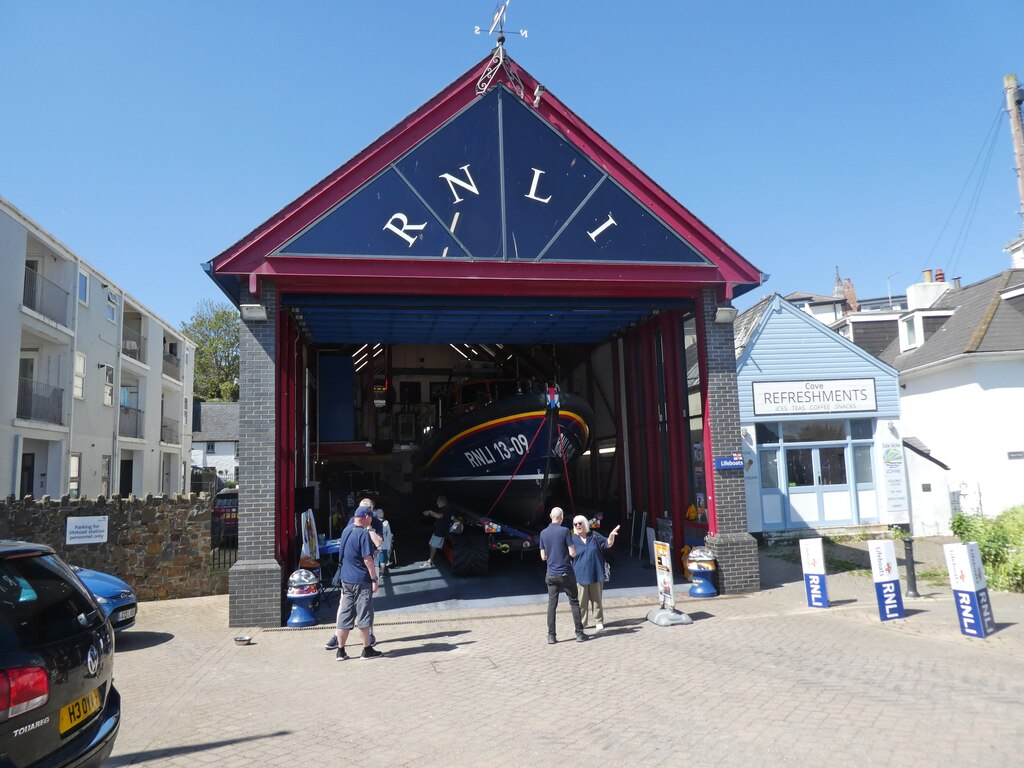
- Ilfracombe Lifeboat Station

- Location within Devon

General information
- Type: Lifeboat station
- Location: The Lifeboat House, 14 Broad Street, Ilfracombe, Devon, EX34 9EE, United Kingdom
- Coordinates: 51.2100°N 4.1162°W
- Opened: First boat 1828; RNLI 1866; Current building 1996
- Owner: Royal National Lifeboat Institution

Website
- Ilfracombe RNLI Lifeboat Station

Ilfracombe Lifeboat Station is located at the head of the harbour in Ilfracombe, a seaside resort overlooking the entrance to the Bristol Channel, on the north-west corner of the county of Devon, England.

The first lifeboat at Ilfracombe was operated by local committee from 1828, part funded by the Royal National Institution for the Preservation of Life from Shipwreck (RNIPLS). A new boat was provided by the Ilfracombe Lifeboat Association in 1850, but in 1866, the Royal National Lifeboat Institution (RNLI) re-established the lifeboat station at Ilfracombe.

The station currently operates the B-class (Atlantic 85) Inshore lifeboat Patrick and Dianne O'Connor (B-957), on station since 2026, and a D-class (IB1) Inshore lifeboat (ILB) Deborah Brown III (D-863), on station since 2022.

== History ==
In 1828, Mr J. V. Lee of Ilfracombe wrote to the Royal National Institution for the Preservation of Life from Shipwreck (RNIPLS), the organisation which became the RNLI in 1854, requesting help towards the modification of a pilot boat, to be used at Ilfracombe as a lifeboat. The RNIPLS agreed to funds not exceeding £28, which turned out to be £13-12s, after the work was carried out. No records of any service are available, although there are reports of a rescue on 1 April 1838, with the RNIPLS awarding 10 shillings to each of the crew of the rescue boat.

Many early lifeboats came to the end of their operational life in the 1840s, and were not replaced, coming just at the time when the RNIPLS was in decline and struggling for funds. A new lifeboat, built by Thomas and White of Cowes, was provided to Ilfracombe in 1850, by the newly formed Ilfracombe Lifeboat Association. The boat was named Lady Franklin, thought to be after the wife of explorer Sir John Franklin, and operated from a boat house at the corner of Hierns Lane near the harbour. Again, no records of any service have been found.

By 1864, the Lady Franklin was reported as unserviceable. In 1865, Mr Nathaniel Vye, JP and several other influential locals, wrote to a now revitalised RNLI, asking that a lifeboat station be established at Ilfracombe. The request was agreed. In 1866, a new boathouse was constructed at a cost of £222-15s, on a site provided by Sir Bourchier Wrey, at the foot of Lantern Hill. A new 32-foot-long (9.8 m) self-righting 'Pulling and Sailing' (P&S) lifeboat, one with both sails and (10) oars, was dispatched to Ilfracombe, transported free of charge to Barnstaple by the London and South Western Railway. Nathaniel Vye was appointed as Honorary Secretary, with George Williams appointed as coxswain.

The cost of the new lifeboat and carriage was the gift of Robert Broadwater of Hornsea Rise Prior to being transported to Ilfracombe, the boat was rowed from Forrestt's boatyard at Limehouse, to Greenwich, where Mr Broadwater was celebrating his 50th birthday. On 14 November 1866, the lifeboat was formally named Broadwater.

At 19:00 on 19 March 1869, the Italian barque Drago was reported in trouble off Morte Point. The Ilfracombe lifeboat Broadwater finally got away at the third attempt, launching at 10:30 the following day, followed by four hours hard rowing in rough seas to reach the casualty vessel. All 15 crew plus a pilot, were rescued, with the lifeboat towed back to Ilfracombe by steam tug.

As a result of the service to the Drago, and the rowing distance required to cover a stretch of coastline notorious for shipwreck, the Ilfracombe branch requested that an additional lifeboat be placed nearer Morte Point. Morte Bay Lifeboat Station (later renamed Morthoe Lifeboat Station) was established in 1871, but with few local residents, it was agreed that Ilfracombe would supply the crew when required. Extra men were enrolled at Ilfracombe, in case both boats were required. Former coxswain George Williams was appointed as caretaker of the new station.

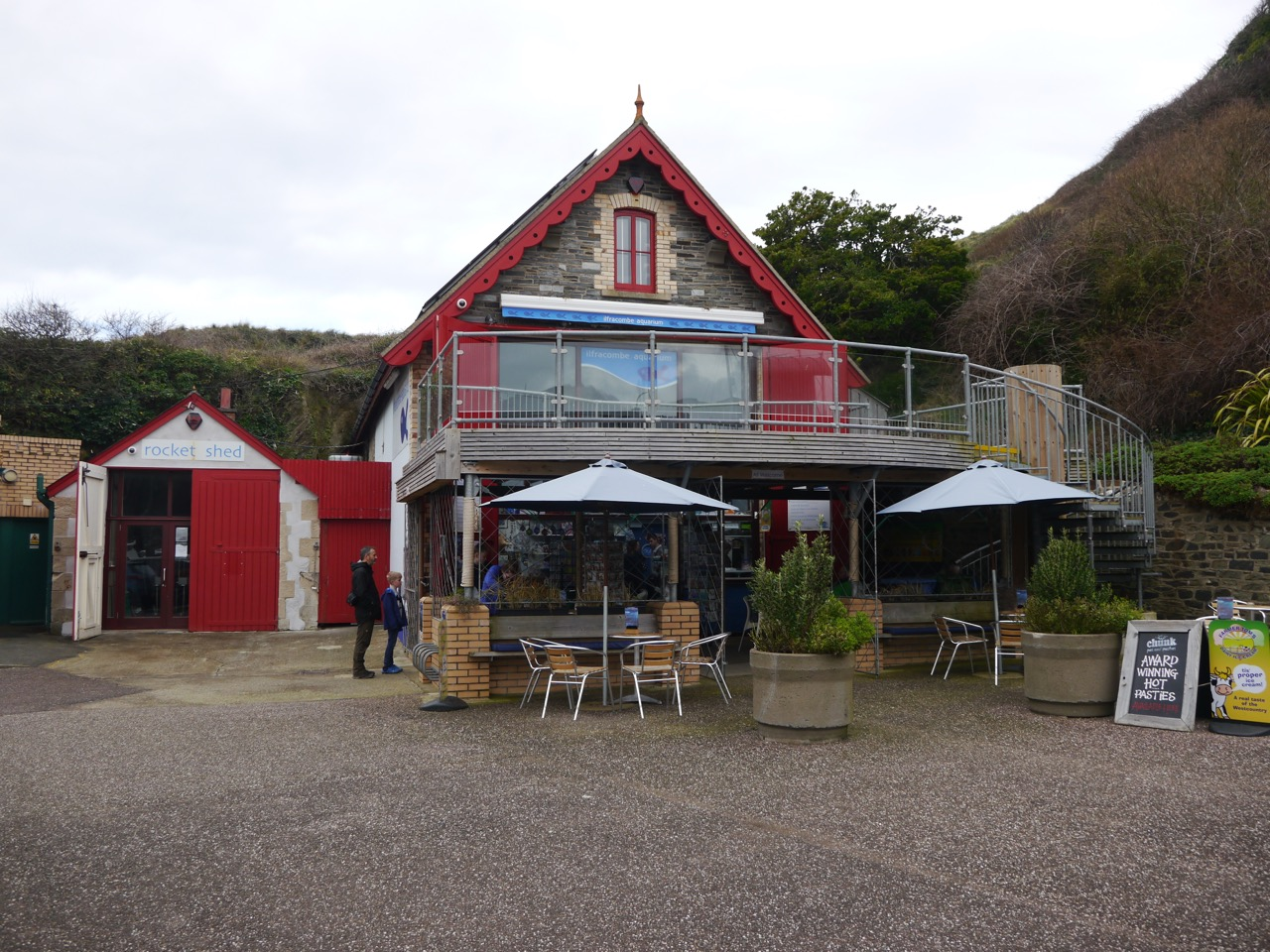
1893 Lifeboat House, Ilfracombe

Alterations to the pier in 1871 meant that the slipway was lost, and the boat then had to be taken along the road to the harbour whenever it was needed. The 1866 boathouse was demolished in 1893, and a new larger building was constructed for the new lifeboat, Co-operator No. 2 (ON 355), which at 37 feet (11 m), was 3-feet longer than the previous boat.

The first motor lifeboat at Ilfracombe was placed on station in March 1936. This was a 32-foot (9.8 m) Surf lifeboat, a type that was designed for work close inshore. It was replaced by a more conventional 35-foot (11 m) Liverpool-class boat in 1945. The Surf boat was sent to the Netherlands, where there was an acute shortage of lifeboats at the end of World War II.

In 1991, a D-class (EA16) Inshore lifeboat (D-336) was placed at Ilfracombe on a trial basis for one season. The Inshore boat was made a permanent asset on 27 November, following a decision by the executive committee.

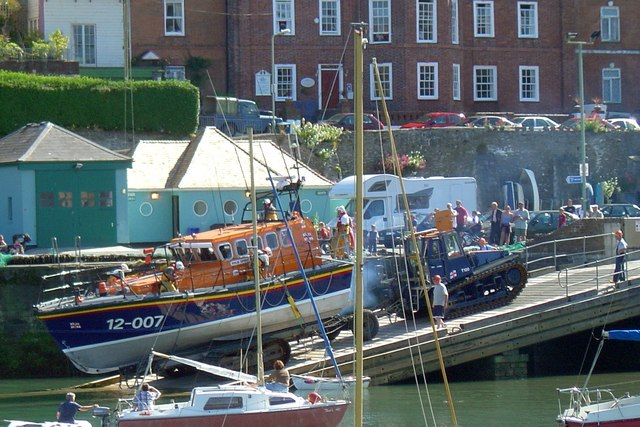
Mersey-class 12-007 Spirit of Derbyshire (ON 1165) during launch

The 1893 boathouse was modified in 1990 to accommodate the new Mersey-class lifeboat 12-007 Spirit of Derbyshire (ON 1165), but in 1996, a new boathouse was constructed at the head of the harbour. Not only providing updated crew facilities, and housing both the All-weather and Inshore lifeboats, it was sited directly in front of the harbour slipway, allowing much faster launch times.

2000 would see the arrival of the D-class (IB1) Inshore lifeboat Deborah Brown (D-555), funded by a special appeal organised by Mr Paul Brown of London, in memory of his wife Deborah. This would be the first of now three lifeboats provided by the same fund, with Deborah Brown III (D-863) arriving on service in 2022.

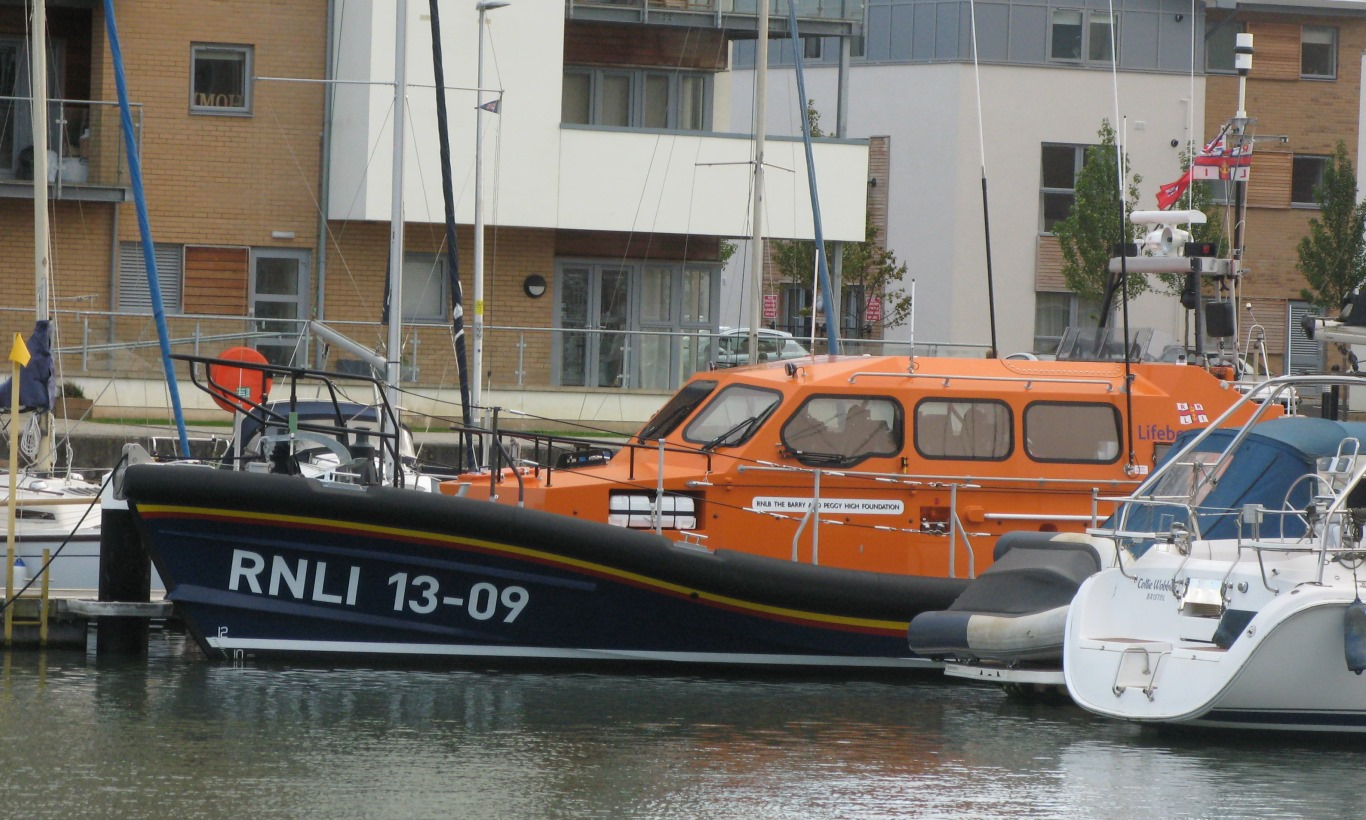
Shannon-class lifeboat 13-09 The Barry and Peggy High Foundation (ON 1316)

After serving Ilfracombe for 25 years, Spirit of Derbyshire was withdrawn to the relief fleet in 2015, replaced with a state-of-the-art Shannon-class lifeboat, 13-09 The Barry and Peggy High Foundation (ON 1316).

On 2 October 2025, the RNLI announced that following a national review of service calls, the Shannon-class lifeboat at Ilfracombe will be reallocated to a different station in 2026/27, and be replaced with an 8.5 m (28 ft) B-class (Atlantic 85) Inshore lifeboat.

The B-class (Atlantic 85) Inshore lifeboat Patrick and Dianne O'Connor (B-957) arrived on station on Thursday 18 June 2026, and after a period of training, replaced the Shannon-class lifeboat on Saturday 19 September 2026.

== Notable service ==
On 13 November 1949, in a full north-west gale, and the worst sea conditions for many years, the SS Monte Gurugu, on passage for Genoa from Newport with a cargo of coal and a crew of 37, broke her rudder off Morte Point, sending out an SOS at 05:00. In a joint service with lifeboats from Clovelly and Appledore, the Ilfracombe lifeboat Richard Silver Oliver (ON 794) was launched, the coxswain using all his years of experience to navigate the coast. An empty lifeboat was found by the Appledore lifeboat, who then managed to pick up one survivor. On arrival on scene, the Ilfracombe lifeboat managed to tow the vessel clear of the shore, and then took aboard the 23 remaining crew. Coxswain Cecil Irwin was awarded the RNLI Silver Medal.

On the afternoon of 7 June 1975, whilst rowing his new 9 ft (2.7 m) dinghy, 14-year-old Scout Martin Ruddy spotted a group of people on a sinking speedboat waving for help. After rowing half a mile out to sea, despite dangerous cross currents and rocks, he reached the vessel after 20 minutes, and rescued four people and a dog. In a rare award to non-lifeboat crew, Martin Ruddy was awarded the RNLI Bronze Medal.

In a Force 8 gale on 9 September 1984, the yacht Liberty was dragging her anchor just 50 yards (46 m) from the shore when the Lloyds II reached her. The lifeboat's crew managed to get a line secured to the yacht and towed her into the harbour. The RNLI Bronze Medal was awarded to Coxswain David Clemence for his courage, leadership and seamanship.

== Area of operation ==
The Shannon-class lifeboat at Ilfracombe has an operating range of 250 nautical miles (460 km) and a top speed of 25 knots (46 km/h). Adjacent All-weather lifeboats are stationed at Appledore to the West, and The Mumbles to the North, along with a B-class (Atlantic 85) Inshore lifeboat at Minehead to the East.

== Station honours ==
The following are awards made at Ilfracombe:

- RNLI Silver Medal
  Capt. C. Gray-Jones, RN, Second Assistant Inspector of Lifeboats – 1875 (Second-Service clasp)
  Cecil G. Irwin, Coxswain – 1950
- Silver Prize Medal, awarded by the Spanish Society for Saving the Shipwrecked
  Cecil G. Irwin, Coxswain – 1950
- RNLI Bronze Medal
  Martin Ruddy, Scout (14) – 1975
  David Clemence, Coxswain – 1984
- Medal Service Certificate
  Colin D. Thadwald, Second Coxswain – 1984
  Wayland Smith, Motor Mechanic – 1984
  John W. Fennell, Assistant Mechanic – 1984
  Andrew P. Bengey, crew member – 1984
  David P. Clemence, crew member – 1984
  Maurice J. Woodger, crew member – 1984
- Diploma of Merit, awarded by the Spanish Society for Saving the Shipwrecked
  Ilfracombe Lifeboat Crew – 1950
- 'The Thanks of the Institution inscribed on Vellum'
  Andrew Putt, Coxswain/Mechanic – 1994
- 'A Framed Letter of Thanks signed by the Chairman of the Institution'
  David Clemence, Coxswain – 1981
  Andrew Bengey, Coxswain – 2000
- 'A Letter of Thanks signed by the Director of the Institution'
  Leigh Hanks, Mechanic – 2000
  Martin Embrey, crew member – 2000
- 'A Letter of Thanks signed by the Chief of Operations of the Institution'
  Ilfracombe Lifeboat Crew – 2000
- British Empire Medal
  Edward George Williams, Coxswain – 1971

== Roll of honour ==
In memory of those lost while serving at Ilfracombe:

- Lost whilst trying to rescue the crew of the ketch Arabella in their own boat, 2 October 1895
  Richard Souch, Rtd. Lifeboatman (61)
  Frederick William Souch, Lifeboatman (25)

== Ilfracombe lifeboats ==
=== Ilfracombe Lifeboat Association ===
On station	ON (Note: ON is the RNLI's Official Number of the boat.)	Name	Built	Class	Comments
1828–c.1843	—	Unnamed	1828	Lifeboat	(Note: Boat of unknown dimensions or manufacturer, costing £13-12s-0d.); Pilot boat fitted to work as a lifeboat.
1850–c.1864	—	Lady Franklin	1850	32-foot Whale Boat	(Note: 32 ft 0 in (9.75 m) x 8 ft 0 in (2.44 m) (12-oared) non-self-righting whale-boat, funded by the Ilfracombe LB Association, built by White of Cowes, costing £144.); Sold in 1864.

=== Pulling and Sailing (P&S) lifeboats ===
On station	ON	Name	Built	Class	Comments
1866–1886	Pre-474	Broadwater	1866	32-foot Prowse self-righting (P&S)	(Note: 32 ft 0 in (9.75 m) x 7 ft 6 in (2.29 m) (10-oared) Prowse-class self-righting (P&S) lifeboat, gift of Mr R. Broadwater of Hornsey Rise, built by Forrestt of Limehouse, London, costing £240.); Broken up in 1886.
1886–1893	53	Co-operator No. 2	1886	34-foot self-righting (P&S)	(Note: 34 ft 0 in (10.36 m) x 7 ft 6 in (2.29 m) (10-oared) self-righting (P&S) lifeboat, gift of Manchester Central Co-operative Society, built by Woolfe of Shadwell, London, costing £297.); Used as a demonstration lifeboat from 1893 until 1907. Broken up in 1907.
1893–1920	355	Co-operator No. 2	1893	37-foot self-righting (P&S)	(Note: 37 ft 0 in (11.28 m) x 9 ft 0 in (2.74 m) (12-oared) self-righting (P&S) lifeboat, gift of Manchester Central Co-operative Society, built by Shuttleworth of Erith, costing £460.); Sold in 1920
1920–1936	596	Richard Crawley	1910	37-foot self-righting (P&S)	(Note: 37 ft 0 in (11.28 m) x 9 ft 3 in (2.82 m) (10-oared) self-righting (P&S) lifeboat, legacy of Mr R. Crawley of Southampton, built by Thames Ironworks of Blackwall, London, costing £1167.); Previously at Southsea until 1918. Sold in 1936. Renamed Good Hope, later Fionnuala. Believed broken up at Lough Neagh, December 2007.

Pre ON numbers are unofficial numbers used by the Lifeboat Enthusiasts' Society to reference early lifeboats not included on the official RNLI list.

=== Motor lifeboats ===
On station	ON	Op.No. (Note: Op.No. is the RNLI's Operational Number of the boat carried on the hull.)	Name	Built	Class	Comments
1936–1945	779	—	Rosabella	1936	Surf	
1945–1952	794	—	Richard Silver Oliver	1937	Liverpool	Previously at Cullercoats and Newquay. Transferred to Criccieth.
1952–1966	904	—	Robert and Phemia Brown	1952	Liverpool	
1966–1990	986	37-19	Lloyds II	1966	Oakley	Transferred to Sheringham.
1990–2015	1165	12-007	Spirit of Derbyshire	1990	Mersey	
2015–2026	1316	13-09	The Barry and Peggy High Foundation	2015	Shannon	All-weather lifeboat withdrawn, 19 September 2026.

More post-service details can be found on the respective lifeboat class pages.

=== Inshore lifeboats ===
==== D class ====
On station	Op.No.	Name	Class	Comments
1991	D-334	Unnamed	D-class (EA16)	Entered service in the relief fleet in 1987.
1992–2000	D-422	Alec Dykes	D-class (EA16)	Saw further service at Bude and in the RNLI relief fleet but was withdrawn from service in 2009.
2000–2009	D-555	Deborah Brown	D-class (EA16)	Transferred to the RNLI relief fleet in 2009.
2009–2020	D-717	Deborah Brown II	D-class (IB1)	Transferred to be the Appledore boarding boat.
2021–2022	D-812	Elaine McLeod Scott	D-class (IB1)	From the relief fleet
2022–	D-863	Deborah Brown III	D-class (IB1)	Previously Lizzie Hook in the relief fleet.

==== B class ====
On station	Op.No.	Name	Class	Comments
2026	B-921	Vivacious Atlantic	B-class (Atlantic 85)	Training boat from the relief fleet
2026–	B-957	Patrick and Dianne O'Connor	B-class (Atlantic 85)	

=== Launch and recovery tractors ===
On station	Op.No.	Reg.No.	Type	Comments
1939–1956	T34	FYR 552	Case L	
1956–1961	T28	EYT 780	Case L	
1961–1963	T49	KGP 854	Case LA	
1963–1973	T69	970 FGP	Case 1000D	
1973–1974	T73	500 GYR	Case 1000D	
1974–1975	T69	970 FGP	Case 1000D	
1975–1977	T74	136 HLC	Case 1000D	
1977–1981	T69	970 FGP	Case 1000D	
1981–1987	T62	PLA 698	Fowler Challenger III	
1987–1998	T101	D335 SUJ	Talus MB-H Crawler	
1998–1999	T97	C282 LNT	Talus MB-H Crawler	
1999–2008	T100	D466 RAW	Talus MB-H Crawler	
2008–2015	T92	A462 AUX	Talus MB-H Crawler	
2015–2021	SC-T07	HF64 CVG	SLARS (Clayton)	Named June and Gordon Hadfield
2021–2026	SC-T23	HF70 EBZ	SLARS (SC Innovation)	
2026–	TW21Hc	J495 XUJ	Talus MB-4H hydrostatic (Mk. 2)	

== See also ==
- List of RNLI stations
- List of former RNLI stations
- Royal National Lifeboat Institution lifeboats
