= Port Talbot Lifeboat Station =

Lifeboat station in Neath Port Talbot, Wales

- Gorsaf Bad Achub Traeth Aberafan

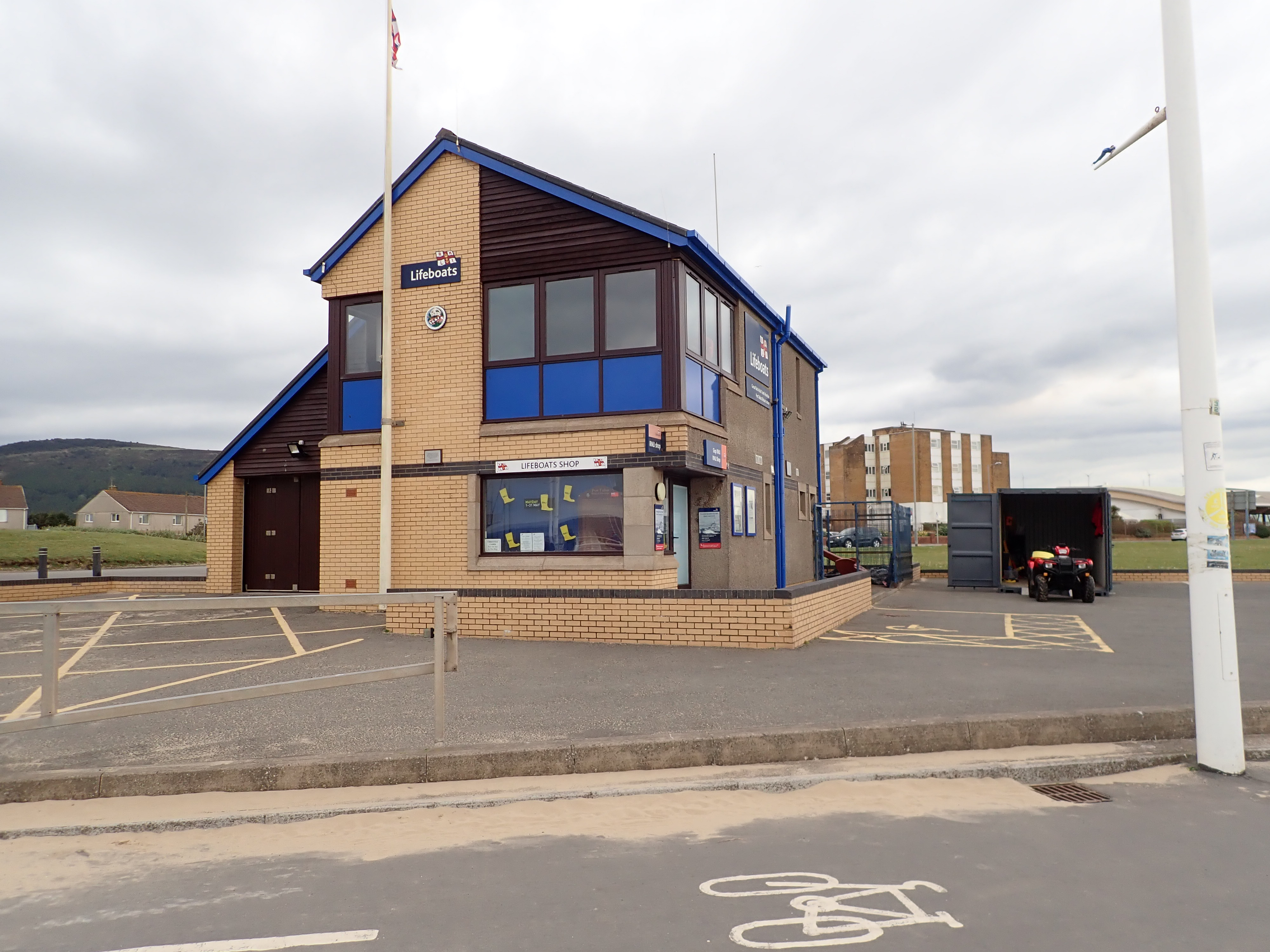
- Port Talbot Lifeboat Station

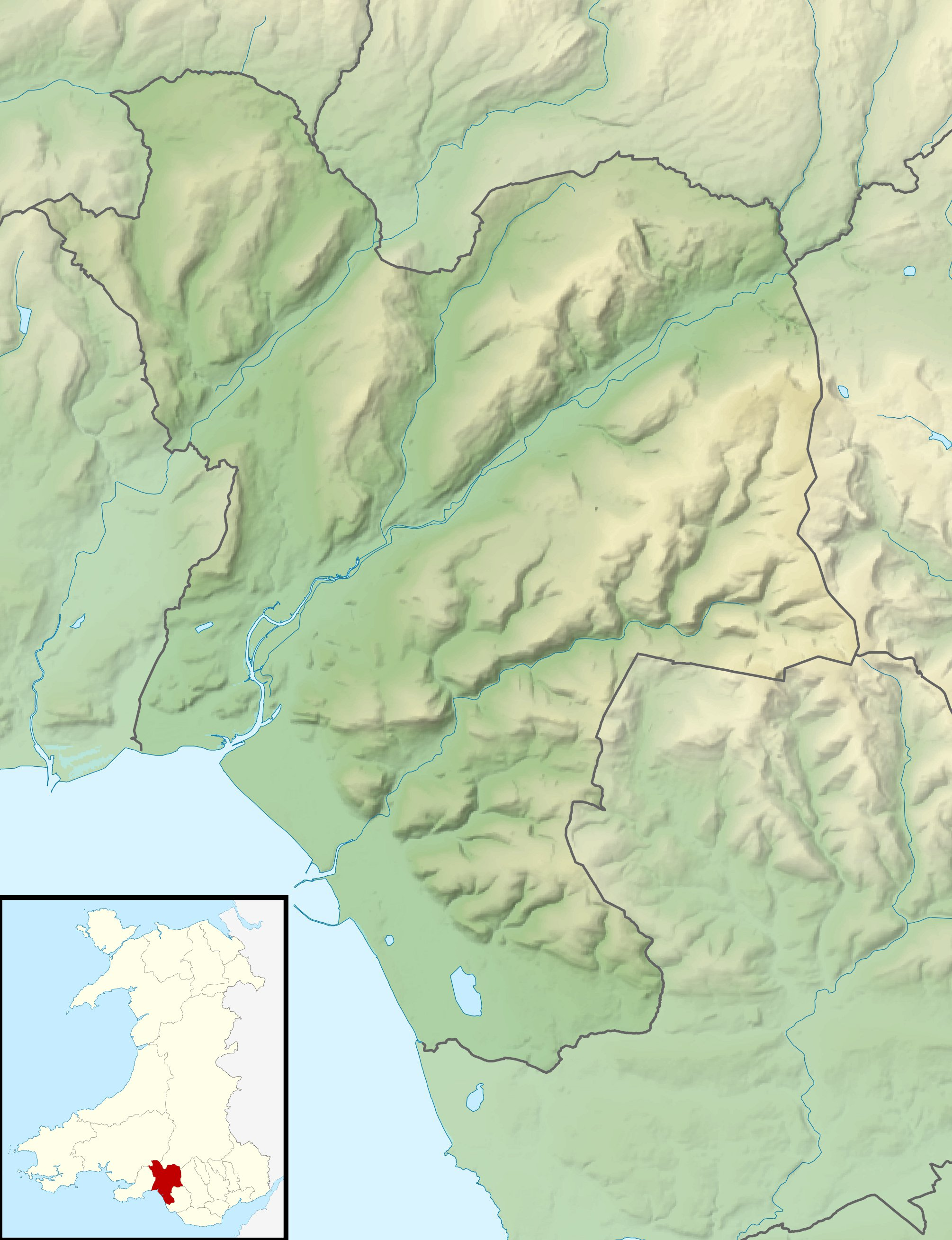
- Location within Neath Port Talbot

General information
- Type: RNLI Lifeboat Station
- Location: Princess Margaret Way, Port Talbot, Neath Port Talbot. SA12 6QW, Wales, UK
- Coordinates: 51°35′36″N 3°49′00″W
- Opened: 1966
- Owner: Royal National Lifeboat Institution

Website
- Port Talbot RNLI Lifeboat Station

Port Talbot Lifeboat Station (Welsh: Gorsaf Bad Achub Traeth Aberafan) is located at Princess Margaret Way in Aberavon, a district of Port Talbot, on the South Wales coast, in the county borough of Neath Port Talbot, Wales.

A lifeboat station was established at Port Talbot in 1966, by the Royal National Lifeboat Institution (RNLI).

The station currently operates the D-class (IB1) Inshore lifeboat Craig Morris (D-848), on station since 2020.

== History ==
In 1964, in response to an increasing amount of water-based leisure activity, the RNLI placed 25 small fast Inshore lifeboats around the country. These were easily launched with just a few people, ideal to respond quickly to local emergencies.

More stations were opened, and on 22 May 1966, a station was established at Port Talbot, with the arrival of a D-class (RFD PB16) Inshore lifeboat, the unnamed D-88.

In 1984, fundraising by the Port Talbot Round Table 335 provided a new D-class lifeboat. Events to raise money had included a row from The Mumbles, and playing Star Wars.

Port Talbot would receive the new type D-class (EA16) Inshore lifeboat in 1990. The lifeboat was funded by a special appeal by the Warwick Ladies' lifeboat guild, one of many such branches supporting the RNLI, but located nowhere near the sea. At a ceremony on 2 September 1990, the new boat was named Warwick (D-402) by Mrs Ann Ainscow, president of the Warwick Ladies' lifeboat guild.

Port Talbot lifeboat Warwick was called at 15:20 on the 4 March 1995, to a 24 ft (7.3 m) converted ship's lifeboat, Panama. The vessel had earlier been towed into harbour by the lifeboat after engine failure, but had not been allowed to remain in the harbour, and was towed out 0.5 mi (0.80 km) by the lifeboat, where she anchored. The plan was that a fishing vessel Moyana would tow the boat back to her mooring on the River Afan later in the day when the tide was in, but the weather turned severely, and the vessel was now in trouble.

The lifeboat launched at 15:36, with Helm Robert Harris, and crew members Lee Worth and Stanley May, into a SSW force 6–7 wind. The lifeboat stood by the casualty, and co-ordinated a tow with the Moyana, which arrived at 16:45. In difficult conditions, and with the tow-line separating at one point, the vessel was eventually brought to her mooring, and the crew landed by the lifeboat. Awards were made to the lifeboat crew.

On 5 September 1999, the new Port Talbot lifeboat was named Gwenllian The Rotary Club of Port Talbot (D-550), after a fundraising appeal by the Rotary Club of Port Talbot, which provided funds for both the lifeboat, and a new Landrover launch vehicle. Eight days later, the station received a visit from RNLI President The Duke of Kent.

On the morning of 10 January 2006, Port Talbot lifeboat was called following reports of a man overboard from the motor vessel Holly. After a difficult but well timed launch into rough seas, with exceptionally high winds, and torrential rain, following reports of a man overboard. They arrived to find a man in the water with no life-jacket, supported by a life-ring, holding onto the vessel. Crew member Chris Thomas was tasked to go overboard, to assist the man into the lifeboat, but as he entered the water, the man disappeared under the waves. Forcing himself under the hull of the vessel, Thomas managed to grab an arm, and pulled the man to the surface, no doubt saving his life. After being pulled into the lifeboat, the man was landed on the beach. A second man, who had initially declined help, was recovered from the vessel by rescue helicopter, which then picked up the man from the water, and both men were then flown to hospital. The Holly capsized soon afterwards. Awards were made to all three lifeboat crew.

In 2009, Gwenllian The Rotary Club of Port Talbot (D-550) was replaced by the new type D-class (IB1) lifeboat. The lifeboat was named Nigel Martin Spender (D-713), funded after an appeal in memory of a former crew member, who had served on the lifeboat for 14 years, until his death in 1999, at the age of 33.

The current lifeboat at Port Talbot was also named in memory of a previous crew member. Craig Morris had served the Port Talbot lifeboat for 11 years between 1993 and 2004, and during that time, the lifeboat had launched 164 times, saving 20 lives. At a ceremony on Sunday, 11 August 2023, the lifeboat was named Craig Morris by Alison Morris, his wife, and their two daughters Jessica and Sophie, with a bottle of champagne poured over the bow. At that time, the Port Talbot lifeboat had been launched 681 times since the station opened in 1966, and saved 75 lives.

== Station honours ==
The following are awards made at Port Talbot.

- Thanks of the Institution Inscribed on Vellum

Robert Vernon Harris, Helm – 1995

David Jones, Helm – 2006
Christopher Thomas, crew member – 2006

- A Framed Letter of Thanks signed by the Chairman of the Institution

Leigh Worth, crew member – 1995
Stanley May, crew member – 1995

Matthew Rossi, Helm – 1999
Leon Murphy, crew member – 1999
David Jones, crew member – 1999

Rachel Thomas, crew member – 2006

- Member, Order of the British Empire (MBE)

William Thomas Hopkins, Port Talbot RNLI President – 2018NYH

Robert Vernon Harris, Deputy Launch Authority – 2019NYH

== Port Talbot lifeboats ==
Op. No. (Note: Op. No. is the RNLI's Operational Number of the boat carried on the hull.)	Name	On station	Class	Comments
D-88	Unnamed	1966–1971	D-class (RFD PB16)	
D-189	Unnamed	1972–1983	D-class (RFD PB16)	
D-297	Unnamed	1984–1990	D-class (RFD PB16)	
D-402	Warwick	1990–1999	D-class (EA16)	
D-550	Gwenllian The Rotary Club of Port Talbot	1999–2009	D-class (EA16)	
D-713	Nigel Martin Spender	2009–2020	D-class (IB1)	
D-848	Craig Morris	2020–2021	D-class (IB1)	
D-816	Eileen Murphy	2021–2022	D-class (IB1)	
D-848	Craig Morris	2022–	D-class (IB1)	

== See also ==
- List of RNLI stations
- List of former RNLI stations
- Royal National Lifeboat Institution lifeboats
