= D-class lifeboat (IB1) =

Inflatable D-class lifeboats

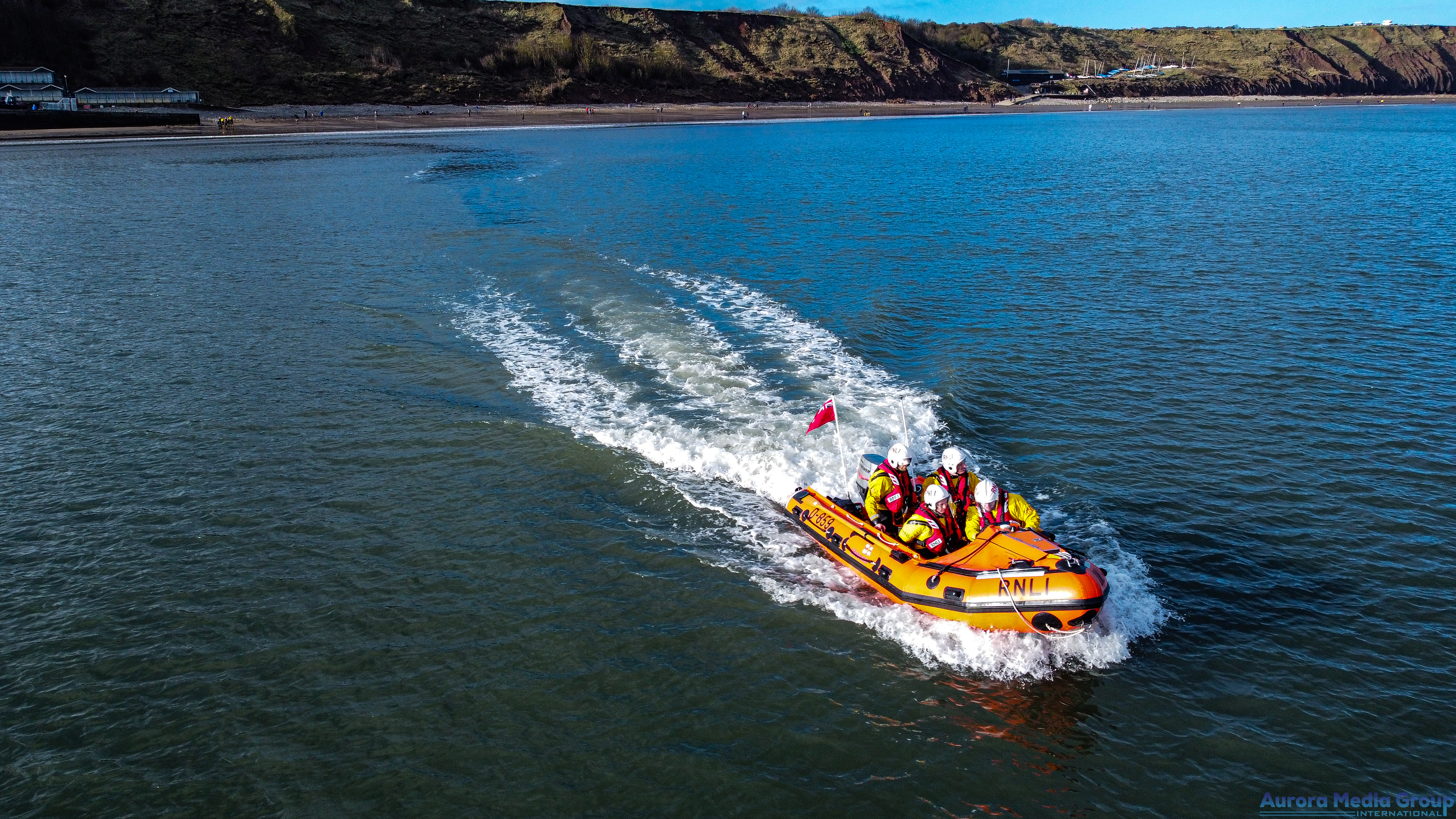
- D-859 The Rotarian of Filey

Class overview
- Name: D-class (IB1)
- Builders: Inshore Lifeboat Centre, Cowes
- Operators: Royal National Lifeboat Institution Some Independent lifeboats
- Preceded by: D-class (EA16)
- Cost: £89,000
- Built: 2001–
- In service: 2003–
- Completed: 305 (August 2025)

General characteristics
- Class & type: Inshore Boat 1
- Displacement: 400 kg (880 lb)
- Length: 5 m (16 ft)
- Beam: 2 m (6.6 ft)
- Draught: 1.4 m (4.6 ft)
- Propulsion: 1 × 50 hp Mariner outboard engine
- Speed: 25 knots (29 mph)
- Endurance: 3 hours
- Capacity: 8
- Complement: 3 or 4

The D-class (IB1) lifeboats are inflatable boats serving in the Royal National Lifeboat Institution (RNLI) inshore lifeboat (ILB) fleet as well as a number of Independent Lifeboats around the UK and Ireland. Although they are known as the "IB1" at times, they are the latest development of the D-class lifeboat and as such are mainly referred to as a "D-class".

This class of lifeboat is one of the smallest operated by the RNLI, and they are a common sight at lifeboat stations round the coast. Unlike other members of the ILB fleet, the D-class (IB1) does not have a rigid hull. All others with the exception of the Arancia-class lifeboats, hovercraft and all-weather lifeboat tenders are rigid inflatable boats.

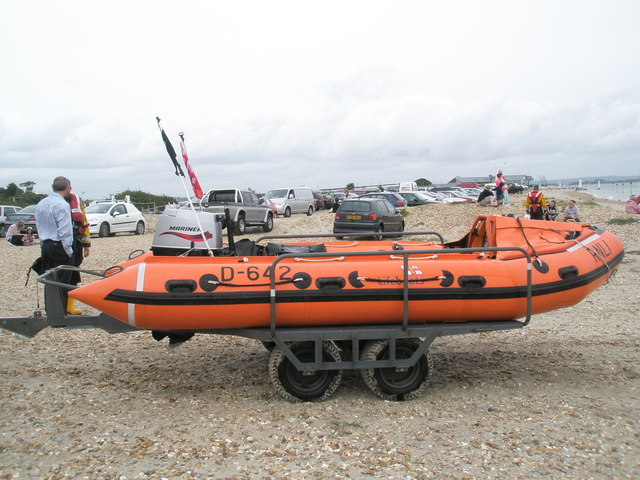
RNLB Amanda, James and Ben (D-642) based in Hayling Island.

The IB1 normally has a crew of three or four and is primarily used for surfer/swimmer incidents as well as assisting in cliff incidents where the casualty is near the water. The very nature of its work requires a swift response, and the IB1 can normally be afloat very quickly.

As of February 2020 the minimum crew for an RNLI IB1 was raised from two to three. Some Independent Lifeboats have different crewing levels to the RNLI.

All of the following fleet details are referenced to the 2026 Lifeboat Enthusiast Society Handbook, with information retrieved directly from RNLI records.

== RNLI D-class fleet ==
=== D-600 – D-699 ===
| Op. No. (Note: Op. No. is the RNLI's Operational Number of the boat.) | Name | In service | Station | Comments |
|---|---|---|---|---|
| D-600 | Metcap | 2001–2002 | Trials | First D-class (IB1) |
| D-600 | Metcap | 2002–2007 | Training fleet (D-600C) | First D-class (IB1) |
| D-600 | Metcap | 2007–2015 | Flood Rescue | First D-class (IB1) |
| D-601 | Jenny Topham | 2002–2003 | Trials | |
| D-601 | Jenny Topham | 2003–2011 | Relief fleet | |
| D-601 | Jenny Topham | 2011– | Training fleet (D-601C) | |
| D-602 | Gilbert Goble | 2002–2004 | Trials | |
| D-602 | Gilbert Goble | 2004–2013 | Relief fleet | |
| D-603 | Forever Forward Denise | 2002–2004 | Trials boat | |
| D-603 | Forever Forward Denise | 2004–2011 | Relief fleet | |
| D-603 | Forever Forward Denise | 2011– | Training fleet (D-603C) | |
| D-604 | Marie Turner | 2002–2004 | Trials | |
| D-604 | Marie Turner | 2004–2013 | Relief fleet | |
| D-605 | Joan and Ted Wiseman 50 | 2003–2011 | Eastbourne | First operational IB1 |
| D-605 | Joan and Ted Wiseman 50 | 2011–2021 | Training fleet (D-605C) | First operational IB1 |
| D-606 | Jennie B | 2003–2012 | Blyth | |
| D-607 | Spirit of Berkhamsted | 2003–2017 | Happisburgh | |
| D-608 | Helen and Ian Tytler | 2003–2011 | Sunderland | |
| D-608 | Helen and Ian Tytler | 2011–2023 | Training fleet (D-608C) | |
| D-609 | 248 Squadron RAF | 2003–2011 | Calshot | |
| D-609 | 248 Squadron RAF | 2011–2022 | Training fleet (D-609C) | |
| D-610 | Catterick | 2004–2012 | Relief fleet | |
| D-610 | Catterick | 2012– | Training fleet (D-610C) | |
| D-611 | The Young Watsons | 2003–2011 | Burry Port | |
| D-611 | The Young Watsons | 2011–2012 | Relief fleet | |
| D-611 | The Young Watsons | 2012– | Training fleet (D-611C) | |
| D-612 | Dave and Trevor Jones | 2003–2012 | West Kirby | |
| D-613 | Jack Cleare | 2003–2012 | Swanage | |
| D-614 | Flo and Dick Smith | 2004–2012 | Trearddur Bay | |
| D-615 | CSMA/Frizzells 80th Anniversary | 2004–2012 | Relief fleet | |
| D-615 | CSMA/Frizzells 80th Anniversary | 2012– | Training fleet (D-615C) | |
| D-616 | Amy Lea | 2004–2012 | New Quay | |
| D-617 | Henry Philip | 2004–2012 | Bude | |
| D-618 | Blue Peter VI | 2004–2012 | Cleethorpes | |
| D-619 | Blue Peter III | 2004–2013 | North Berwick | |
| D-620 | Edna May | 2004–2012 | Relief fleet | |
| D-620 | Edna May | 2012–2024 | Training fleet (D-620C) | |
| D-621 | Duncan Ferguson | 2004–2013 | Arbroath | |
| D-622 | May II | 2004–2013 | Borth | |
| D-622 | May II | 2013–2014 | Relief fleet | |
| D-623 | Peterborough Beer Festival II | 2004–2013 | The Mumbles | |
| D-623 | Peterborough Beer Festival II | 2013–2014 | Relief fleet | |
| D-624 | Spirit of the RLC | 2004–2013 | Sennen Cove | |
| D-624 | Spirit of the RLC | 2013–2014 | Relief fleet | |
| D-625 | John Charles Raybould | 2004–2012 | Relief fleet | |
| D-625 | John Charles Raybould | 2012–2022 | Training fleet (D-625C) | |
| D-626 | David Leslie Wilson | 2004–2014 | Montrose | |
| D-627 | Arthur Bate II | 2004–2014 | Conwy | |
| D-628 | Austin Burnett | 2004–2014 | Little and Broad Haven | |
| D-629 | The Shannock | 2004–2014 | Workington | |
| D-630 | Langley Muir | 2004–2012 | Relief fleet | |
| D-630 | Langley Muir | 2012–2016 | Training fleet (D-630C) | |
| D-631 | Spirit of Juniper | 2004–2014 | Littlehampton | |
| D-631 | Spirit of Juniper | 2014–2018 | Inshore Lifeboat Centre | |
| D-632 | Godfrey and Desmond Nall | 2004–2014 | Rhyl | |
| D-633 | Pride of London Foresters | 2005–2014 | Southend-on-Sea | |
| D-634 | Rusper | 2005–2014 | Rock | |
| D-634 | Rusper | 2014–2018 | Relief fleet | |
| D-635 | Semper Paratus | 2005–2012 | Relief fleet | |
| D-635 | Semper Paratus | 2012–2023 | Training fleet (D-635C) | |
| D-636 | Valerie Wilson | 2005–2014 | Newquay | |
| D-637 | Aldergrove II | 2005–2014 | Newcastle | |
| D-638 | Richard John Talbot Miller | 2005–2014 | Angle | |
| D-638 | Richard John Talbot Miller | 2014–2018 | Barry Dock (SAR BB-638) | |
| D-639 | Howard and Mary Broadfield | 2005–2015 | Berwick-upon-Tweed | |
| D-640 | Mabel Davies | 2005–2016 | Relief fleet | |
| D-640 | Mabel Davies | 2016– | Training fleet (D-640C) | |
| D-641 | Blue Peter IV | 2005–2015 | St Agnes | |
| D-642 | Amanda, James and Ben | 2005–2015 | Hayling Island | |
| D-643 | Tra Mhor | 2005–2015 | Tramore | |
| D-643 | Tra Mhor | 2015–2018 | Boarding Boat | |
| D-644 | Philip Booth | 2005–2015 | Wexford | |
| D-645 | The Martin Jolly | 2004–2012 | Relief fleet | |
| D-645 | The Martin Jolly | 2012–2015 | Training fleet (D-645C) | |
| D-645 | The Martin Jolly | 2015–2018 | Inshore Lifeboat Centre | |
| D-646 | Hannabella Ferguson | 2005–2015 | Larne | |
| D-647 | Barry Lazell | 2005–2015 | Shoreham Harbour | |
| D-648 | Spirit of Mortimer | 2005–2015 | Teddington | |
| D-649 | Dorothy Beatrice May Gorman | 2005–2015 | Bembridge | |
| D-650 | Helen Olive Palmer | 2005–2015 | Relief fleet | |
| D-650 | Helen Olive Palmer | 2015–2016 | Training fleet (D-650C) | |
| D-650 | Helen Olive Palmer | 2016–2019 | Appledore (SAR BB) | |
| D-651 | John William Hirst | 2005–2015 | Torbay | |
| D-652 | Team Effort | 2005–2015 | Fishguard | |
| D-653 | William Hadley | 2005–2015 | Mablethorpe | |
| D-654 | Angel of Holyhead (Civil Service No.46) | 2005–2016 | Holyhead | |
| D-654 | Angel of Holyhead (Civil Service No.46) | 2017–2024 | Boarding Boat (BB-654) | |
| D-655 | Guardian Angel (Civil Service No.47) | 2005–2015 | Relief fleet | |
| D-655 | Guardian Angel (Civil Service No.47) | 2015– | Training fleet (D-655C) | |
| D-656 | William Robert Sanderson | 2005–2016 | Llandudno | |
| D-656 | William Robert Sanderson | 2016 | Relief fleet | |
| D-657 | Sally | 2006–2016 | Lytham St Annes | |
| D-658 | Sir Y Flint | 2006–2016 | Flint | |
| D-659 | George Godfrey Benbow | 2006–2016 | Howth | |
| D-660 | City of Leeds II | 2006–2012 | Relief fleet | |
| D-660 | City of Leeds II | 2012–2017 | Training fleet (D-660C) | |
| D-660 | City of Leeds II | 2019 | Appledore (SAR BB) | |
| D-661 | Jane Anne III | 2006–2016 | Wells-next-the-Sea | |
| D-661 | Jane Anne III | 2017–2023 | Boarding Boat (BB-661) | |
| D-662 | Eleanor | 2006–2016 | Sheerness | |
| D-663 | Duggie Rodbard | 2006–2016 | Walmer | |
| D-664 | Puffin | 2006–2016 | Burnham-on-Sea | |
| D-665 | The Doris | 2007–2016 | Relief fleet | |
| D-665 | The Doris | 2016–2022 | Training fleet (D-665C) | |
| D-666 | Number not used | | | |
| D-667 | The Rotary Centenary Queen | 2006–2016 | Anstruther | |
| D-668 | Colin Bramley Parker | 2007–2016 | St Ives | |
| D-669 | George Bearman | 2006–2017 | Exmouth | |
| D-669 | George Bearman | 2017– | Boarding Boat (BB-669) | |
| D-670 | Harold Arnold | 2007–2017 | Relief fleet | |
| D-671 | Sheringham Shanty Men | 2007–2017 | Wicklow | |
| D-671 | Sheringham Shanty Men | 2017– | Relief fleet | |
| D-672 | Ernest and Rose Chapman II | 2007–2017 | Burnham-on-Crouch | |
| D-673 | Christine | 2007–2017 | Aldeburgh | |
| D-673 | Christine | 2017–2024 | Boarding Boat (BB-673) | |
| D-674 | OEM Stone III | 2007–2017 | Whitby | |
| D-674 | OEM Stone III | 2017–2024 | Boarding Boat (BB-674)}} | |
| D-675 | The Doris and Harry B | 2007–2017 | Relief fleet | |
| D-675 | The Doris and Harry B | 2017–2022 | Boarding Boat (BB-675) | |
| D-676 | Leslie and Peter Downes | 2007–2017 | Pwllheli | |
| D-676 | Leslie and Peter Downes | 2017–2023 | Boarding Boat (BB-676) | |
| D-677 | Jacky Hunsley | 2007–2014 | Redcar | |
| D-678 | Rotarian Clive Tanner | 2007–2017 | Barmouth | |
| D-678 | Rotarian Clive Tanner | 2017–2022 | Relief fleet | |
| D-679 | Gráinne Uaile | 2007–2017 | Clifden | |
| D-679 | Gráinne Uaile | 2018– | Boarding Boat (BB-679) | |
| D-680 | Marjorie Wilkinson | 2007–2017 | Relief fleet | |
| D-680 | Marjorie Wilkinson | 2017–2024 | Training fleet | |
| D-681 | Olive Herbert Two | 2007–2017 | Fowey | |
| D-681 | Olive Herbert Two | 2018– | Boarding Boat (BB-681) | |
| D-682 | The Essex Freemason | 2007–2017 | Southend-on-Sea | |
| D-682 | The Essex Freemason | 2018 | Relief fleet | |
| D-682 | The Essex Freemason | 2018– | Boarding Boat (BB-682) | |
| D-683 | Tradewinds | 2007–2018 | Fethard | |
| D-683 | Tradewinds | 2018– | Boarding Boat (BB-683) | |
| D-684 | Telford Shopping Centre | 2007–2018 | Troon | |
| D-685 | Winifred | 2007–2012 | Relief fleet | |
| D-685 | Winifred | 2012–2018 | Training fleet (D-685C) | |
| D-685 | Winifred | 2018–2023 | Boarding Boat (BB-685) | |
| D-686 | Peter Downes | 2008–2018 | Seahouses | |
| D-687 | The Western | 2008–2018 | Ballyglass | |
| D-687 | The Western | 2018–2023 | Boarding Boat (BB-687) | |
| D-688 | Albert Wordley | 2008–2018 | Horton and Port Eynon | |
| D-689 | Enfys | 2008–2018 | Moelfre | |
| D-689 | Enfys | 2018– | Boarding Boat (BB-689) | |
| D-690 | David Young | 2008–2013 | Relief fleet | |
| D-690 | David Young | 2013–2015 | Weston-super-Mare | |
| D-690 | David Young | 2015–2019 | Relief fleet | |
| D-690 | David Young | 2019– | Boarding Boat (BB-690) | |
| D-691 | Betty and Thomas Moore | 2008–2018 | Selsey | |
| D-692 | Connie Dains | 2008–2018 | Penarth | 2021 privately owned |
| D-693 | Mark Noble | 2008–2018 | Tynemouth | |
| D-694 | James Bissett Simpson | 2008–2018 | Aberdeen | |
| D-694 | James Bissett Simpson | 2019–2025 | Boarding Boat (BB-694) | |
| D-695 | The Pat | 2008–2019 | Relief fleet | |
| D-695 | The Pat | 2019– | Boarding Boat (BB-695) | |
| D-696 | Anna Stock | 2008–2019 | Weston-super-Mare | |
| D-696 | Anna Stock | 2019– | Boarding Boat (BB-696) | |
| D-697 | Stranraer Saviour (Civil Service No.49) | 2008–2018 | Stranraer | |
| D-697 | Stranraer Saviour (Civil Service No.49) | 2019– | Boarding Boat (BB-697) | |
| D-698 | The Sheila Barrie | 2008–2019 | Broughty Ferry | |
| D-699 | Daphne May | 2008–2019 | Hastings | |

=== D-700 – D-799 ===
| Op. No. | Name | In service | Station | Comments |
|---|---|---|---|---|
| D-700 | Bobby's Boat | 2008–2014 | Relief fleet | |
| D-700 | Bobby's Boat | 2014 | Rhyl | |
| D-700 | Bobby's Boat | 2014–2015 | Relief fleet | |
| D-700 | Bobby's Boat | 2015 | Redcar | |
| D-700 | Bobby's Boat | 2015–2019 | Relief fleet | |
| D-700 | Bobby's Boat | 2019–2020 | Appledore (SAR BB) | |
| D-701 | Henley Eight | 2009–2019 | Withernsea | |
| D-702 | Spirit of the Dart | 2008–2019 | Dartmouth | |
| D-703 | Joseph Hughes | 2008–2019 | Craster | |
| D-704 | Myrtle and Trevor Gurr | 2008–2019 | St Davids | |
| D-704 | Myrtle and Trevor Gurr | 2019 | Cardigan | |
| D-704 | Sue Roberts | 2023– | Humber Rescue | |
| D-705 | Northern Light | 2008–2012 | Relief fleet | Now Boarding boat at Fleetwood. (BB-705) |
| D-705 | Northern Light | 2012–2014 | Training fleet (D-705C) | Now Boarding boat at Fleetwood. (BB-705) |
| D-705 | Northern Light | 2014–2015 | Relief fleet | Now Boarding boat at Fleetwood. (BB-705) |
| D-705 | Northern Light | 2015 | St Agnes | Now Boarding boat at Fleetwood. (BB-705) |
| D-705 | Northern Light | 2015–2018 | Relief fleet | Now Boarding boat at Fleetwood. (BB-705) |
| D-705 | Northern Light | 2018–2020 | Training fleet | Now Boarding boat at Fleetwood. (BB-705) |
| D-705 | Northern Light | 2020– | Fleetwood Boarding Boat (BB-705) | Now Boarding boat at Fleetwood. (BB-705) |
| D-706 | Tigger Three | 2008–2019 | Margate | |
| D-706 | Tigger Three | 2020– | Boarding boat (BB-706) | |
| D-707 | Copeland Bell | 2008–2019 | Port Isaac | |
| D-707 | Copeland Bell | 2019–2022 | Relief fleet | |
| D-708 | Jimmy Miff | 2009–2019 | Dunbar | |
| D-709 | Elsie Ida Meade | 2009–2019 | Cardigan | |
| D-710 | Charles Blankstone | 2009–2020 | Relief fleet | |
| D-710 | Charles Blankstone | 2020– | Training fleet (D-710C) | |
| D-711 | Caird An Chuain | 2009–2020 | Courtown | |
| D-711 | Caird An Chuain | 2020 | Boarding boat (BB-711) | |
| D-712 | Christine | 2009–2020 | Minehead | |
| D-712 | Christine | 2020– | Boarding boat (BB-712) | |
| D-713 | Nigel Martin Spender | 2009–2020 | Port Talbot | |
| D-714 | Jean Ryall | 2010–2011 | South Broads | In private ownership with NautiQa, Lowestoft, November 2026. |
| D-714 | Jean Ryall | 2011–2012 | Porthcawl | In private ownership with NautiQa, Lowestoft, November 2026. |
| D-714 | Jean Ryall | 2012–2022 | Relief fleet | In private ownership with NautiQa, Lowestoft, November 2026. |
| D-715 | Leicester Tiger | 2010–2020 | Relief fleet | |
| D-715 | Leicester Tiger | 2020–2024 | Training fleet | |
| D-716 | Brian's Pride | 2009–2020 | Portsmouth | |
| D-717 | Deborah Brown II | 2009–2020 | Ilfracombe | |
| D-717 | Deborah Brown II | 2020–2022 | Appledore (SAR BB) | |
| D-718 | Catherine | 2009–2021 | Kippford | |
| D-718 | Catherine | 2021– | Boarding boat (BB-718) | |
| D-719 | Mary Elizabeth Barnes | 2009–2021 | Fleetwood | 9 Nov 2009–23 Feb 2021 |
| D-719 | Mary Elizabeth Barnes | 2021– | Tynemouth (BB-719) | Nov 2021– |
| D-720 | Norma and Bill Burleigh | 2010–2022 | Relief fleet | |
| D-721 | Windsor Spirit | 2009–2021 | Bridlington | |
| D-721 | Windsor Spirit | 2021– | Boarding Boat (BB-721) | |
| D-722 | Margaret Mary Timpany | 2009–2021 | Morecambe | |
| D-723 | Damarkand IV | 2009–2018 | Clacton-on-Sea | Purchased by Safetyboat Services Ltd |
| D-724 | John Wesley Hillard III | 2009–2021 | Scarborough | |
| D-724 | John Wesley Hillard III | 2021– | Boarding Boat (BB-724) | |
| D-725 | Kenneth R. Easter | 2010–2015 | Relief fleet | |
| D-725 | Kenneth R. Easter | 2015–2016 | Training fleet (D-725C) | |
| D-725 | Kenneth R. Easter | 2016–2022 | Relief fleet | |
| D-726 | Bradley and Sonia | 2010–2022 | Fenit | |
| D-727 | Georgina Taylor | 2009–2021 | Tenby | Now on display in the RNLI Heritage Collection at Chatham Historic Dockyard, November 2026. |
| D-728 | Braund | 2010–2021 | Filey | |
| D-728 | Quantum Lepe | 2023– | Solent Rescue | |
| D-729 | Eileen Mary George | 2010–2022 | Blackpool | |
| D-729 | Eileen Mary George | 2022–2024 | Appledore (SAR BB) | |
| D-730 | Constance Green | 2010–2017 | Relief fleet | |
| D-730 | Constance Green | 2017–2023 | Training fleet | |
| D-730 | Constance Green | 2023–2025 | Boarding Boat (BB-730) | |
| D-731 | Réalt na Mara | 2010–2022 | Dún Laoghaire | |
| D-732 | Basil Eric Brooks | 2010–2022 | Blackpool | |
| D-732 | Basil Eric Brooks | 2023– | Boarding Boat (BB-732) | |
| D-733 | Vision of Tamworth | 2010–2022 | Barrow | |
| D-733 | The Warren J & B | 2022– | Freshwater Bay | |
| D-734 | Spirit of Leicester | 2010–2022 | Cromer | |
| D-735 | Bill and John Cama | 2010–2014 | Relief fleet | |
| D-735 | Bill and John Cama | 2014–2015 | Redcar | |
| D-735 | Bill and John Cama | 2015–2018 | Relief fleet | |
| D-735 | Bill and John Cama | 2018–2024 | Training fleet | |
| D-736 | Mildred Holcroft | 2010–2022 | Amble | |
| D-736 | Mildred Holcroft | 2023– | Boarding Boat (BB-736) | |
| D-737 | Alistair Greenless | 2010–2022 | Campbeltown | |
| D-738 | David Roulston (Civil Service No.52) | 2010–2022 | Portrush | |
| D-738 | David Roulston (Civil Service No.52) | 2022–2025 | Relief fleet | |
| D-738 | Unnamed | 2025– | Hemsby (Ind.) | |
| D-739 | Peterborough Beer Festival IV | 2010–2016 | Skegness | Sank on 20 May 2016 after catching fire |
| D-740 | Ole Schroder | 2010–2022 | Relief fleet | |
| D-740 | Ole Schroder | 2022–2024 | Training fleet | |
| D-741 | Ollie Naismith | 2010–2022 | Looe | |
| D-741 | Ollie Naismith | 2022– | Boarding Boat (BB-741) | |
| D-742 | Spirit of Leicester | 2010–2023 | Port St Mary | |
| D-742 | Spirit of Leicester | 2023– | Boarding Boat (BB-742) | |
| D-743 | Olwen and Tom | 2010–2023 | Teddington | |
| D-744 | Lawrence and Percy Hobbs | 2011–2023 | Eastbourne | |
| D-744 | Lawrence and Percy Hobbs | 2023–2024 | Relief fleet | |
| D-745 | My Way | 2011–2015 | Relief fleet | |
| D-745 | My Way | 2015–2023 | Eyemouth | |
| D-746 | Alan and Amy | 2011–2023 | Blyth | |
| D-746 | Alan and Amy | 2023–2024 | Relief fleet | |
| D-747 | My Jo | 2011–2023 | Sunderland | |
| D-747 | My Jo | 2023– | Boarding Boat (BB-747) | |
| D-748 | Willett | 2011–2023 | Calshot | |
| D-749 | Diane Hilary | 2011–2023 | Burry Port | |
| D-750 | Yeoman of the Guard | 2011–2023 | Relief fleet | |
| D-750 | Yeoman of the Guard | 2023–2024 | Training fleet | |
| D-751 | Seahorse | 2012–2023 | West Kirby | privately owned 2024 |
| D-752 | Phil and Jack | 2012–2023 | Swanage | |
| D-752 | Phil and Jack | 2023– | Training fleet | |
| D-753 | Clive and Imelda Rawlings | 2012–2024 | Trearddur Bay | |
| D-753 | Clive and Imelda Rawlings | 2024– | Boarding Boat (BB-753) | |
| D-754 | Audrey LJ | 2012–2024 | New Quay | (Note: The late Audrey Lawson-Johnston was rescued from the Lusitania disaster in 1915 and this inspired her and her family to become fundraisers for the RNLI, raising funds for two lifeboats at New Quay.) |
| D-754 | Audrey LJ | 2024– | Boarding Boat (BB-754) | (Note: The late Audrey Lawson-Johnston was rescued from the Lusitania disaster in 1915 and this inspired her and her family to become fundraisers for the RNLI, raising funds for two lifeboats at New Quay.) |
| D-755 | Peggy D | 2012–2016 | Relief fleet | |
| D-755 | Peggy D | 2016–2019 | Training fleet | |
| D-755 | Peggy D | 2019–2020 | Relief fleet | |
| D-755 | Peggy D | 2020–2021 | Exmouth | |
| D-755 | Peggy D | 2021–2025 | Relief fleet | |
| D-756 | George Bird | 2012–2024 | Bude | |
| D-756 | George Bird | 2024– | Appledore (SAR BB) | |
| D-757 | James Burgess II | 2012–2024 | Cleethorpes | |
| D-758 | Evelyn M | 2013–2024 | North Berwick | |
| D-758 | Evelyn M | 2024– | Boarding Boat (BB-758) | |
| D-759 | Robert Fergusson | 2013–2024 | Arbroath | |
| D-760 | Geoffrey Scott | 2013–2024 | Borth | |
| D-760 | Geoffrey Scott | 2024–2025 | Relief fleet | |
| D-761 | Mark Lott | 2013–2024 | The Mumbles | |
| D-761 | Mark Lott | 2024–2025 | Relief fleet | |
| D-762 | M & P Anderson Vick | 2013–2023 | Relief fleet | |
| D-762 | M & P Anderson Vick | 2023–2025 | Training fleet | |
| D-763 | Amy Brown | 2013–2024 | Sennen Cove | |
| D-764 | Nigel A. Kennedy | 2014–2025 | Montrose | |
| D-764 | Nigel A. Kennedy | 2025– | Boarding Boat (BB-764) | |
| D-765 | The May-Bob | 2014–2025 | Conwy | |
| D-765 | The May-Bob | 2025– | Relief fleet | |
| D-766 | Jack & Edith May | 2014–2025 | Little and Broad Haven | |
| D-766 | Jack & Edith May | 2025– | Boarding Boat (BB-766) | |
| D-767 | John F. Mortimer | 2014–2025 | Workington | |
| D-767 | John F. Mortimer | 2025– | Boarding Boat (BB-767) | |
| D-768 | Robleen | 2014–2024 | Relief fleet | |
| D-768 | Robleen | 2024– | Boarding Boat (BB-768) | |
| D-769 | Ray of Hope | 2014–2025 | Littlehampton | |
| D-770 | Mary Maxwell | 2014–2025 | Rhyl | |
| D-770 | Mary Maxwell | 2025– | Boarding Boat (BB-770) | |
| D-771 | William Henderson | 2014–2025 | Southend-on-Sea | |
| D-771 | William Henderson | 2025– | Relief fleet | |
| D-772 | Rusper II | 2014–2025 | Rock | |
| D-772 | Rusper II | 2025– | Boarding Boat (BB-772) | |
| D-773 | Enid Mary | 2014–2025 | Newquay | |
| D-774 | Arthur Hamilton | 2014–2018 | Relief fleet | |
| D-774 | Arthur Hamilton | 2018–2020 | Clacton-on-Sea | |
| D-774 | Arthur Hamilton | 2020–2022 | Relief fleet | |
| D-774 | Arthur Hamilton | 2022–2024 | Newhaven | |
| D-774 | Arthur Hamilton | 2024– | Relief fleet | |
| D-775 | Eliza | 2014–2025 | Newcastle | |
| D-775 | Eliza | 2025– | Publicity | |
| D-776 | Super G II | 2015–2020 | Angle | |
| D-776 | Super G II | 2020–2022 | Porthcawl | |
| D-776 | Super G II | 2022– | Relief fleet | |
| D-777 | Vi and Charles Hogbin | 2015–2025 | Berwick-upon-Tweed | |
| D-777 | Vi and Charles Hogbin | 2025– | Relief fleet | |
| D-778 | Norman Harvey | 2015–2026 | Bembridge | |
| D-779 | Jacob | 2015–2026 | Hayling Island | |
| D-780 | Hicks' Help | 2015–2023 | Relief fleet | |
| D-780 | Hicks' Help | 2023– | Training fleet | |
| D-781 | Isabella Purchase | 2015–2026 | Tramore | |
| D-782 | Alfred William Newman | 2015–2026 | Wexford | |
| D-783 | Terry | 2015– | Larne | |
| D-784 | Joan Woodland | 2015–2026 | Shoreham Harbour | |
| D-785 | Peter Saw | 2015– | Teddington | |
| D-786 | Eileen May Loach-Thomas | 2015– | Redcar | |
| D-787 | XKalibur | 2015– | St Agnes | |
| D-788 | Leslie & Mary Daws | 2015– | Torbay | |
| D-789 | Edward Arthur Richardson | 2015– | Fishguard | |
| D-790 | Stanley Whiteley Chadwick | 2015– | Mablethorpe | |
| D-791 | Mary & Archie Hooper | 2016– | Holyhead | |
| D-792 | Marie Theresa Bertha Barrass | 2016 | Relief fleet | |
| D-792 | Marie Theresa Bertha Barrass | 2016–2019 | Skegness | |
| D-792 | Marie Theresa Bertha Barrass | 2019– | Relief fleet | |
| D-793 | Dr Barbara Saunderson | 2016– | Llandudno | |
| D-794 | Duggie Rodbard II | 2016– | Walmer | |
| D-795 | Lady Barbara | 2016– | Flint | |
| D-796 | Aideen Cresswell | 2016– | Howth | |
| D-797 | Peter Wilcox | 2016– | Wells-next-the-Sea | |
| D-798 | John Wickens | 2016–2017 | Poole | |
| D-798 | John Wickens | 2017–2021 | Relief fleet | |
| D-798 | John Wickens | 2021–2024 | Walton and Frinton (SAR BB) | |
| D-798 | John Wickens | 2024 | Relief fleet | |
| D-798 | John Wickens | 2025– | Walton and Frinton | |
| D-799 | Buster | 2016– | Sheerness | |

=== D-800 – D-899 ===
| Op. No. | Name | In service | Station | Comments |
|---|---|---|---|---|
| D-800 | MOAM | 2016– | Lytham St Annes | |
| D-801 | Burnham Reach | 2016– | Burnham-on-Sea | |
| D-802 | Akira | 2016– | Anstruther | |
| – | Christopher Taylor | 2016– | Southport Offshore Rescue Trust | Built for S.O.R.T. |
| D-803 | Donald Dean | 2016– | St Ives | |
| D-804 | Gladys Maud Burton | 2017– | Poole | |
| D-805 | George Bearman II | 2017– | Exmouth | |
| D-806 | Dennis-Audrey | 2017– | Wicklow | |
| D-807 | David and Barbara Chapman | 2017– | Burnham-on-Crouch | |
| D-808 | Susan Scott | 2017– | Aldeburgh | |
| D-809 | Eric Howland | 2017– | Relief fleet | |
| D-810 | Warter Priory | 2017– | Whitby | |
| D-811 | Robert J. Wright | 2017– | Pwllheli | |
| D-812 | Elaine McLeod Scott | 2017–2021 | Relief fleet | |
| D-812 | Elaine McLeod Scott | 2021–2022 | Ilfracombe | |
| D-812 | Elaine McLeod Scott | 2022–2024 | Relief fleet | |
| D-812 | Elaine McLeod Scott | 2024 | Newhaven | |
| D-812 | Elaine McLeod Scott | 2024– | Relief fleet | |
| D-813 | Russell Pickering | 2017– | Happisburgh | |
| D-814 | Craig Steadman | 2017– | Barmouth | |
| D-815 | Celia Mary | 2017–2019 | Clifden | |
| D-815 | Celia Mary | 2019– | Relief fleet | |
| D-816 | Eileen Murphy | 2017–2021 | Relief Fleet | |
| D-816 | Eileen Murphy | 2021–2022 | Port Talbot | |
| D-816 | Eileen Murphy | 2022– | Relief fleet | |
| D-817 | Olive Three | 2017– | Fowey | |
| D-818 | Len Thorne GM DFC | 2018– | Southend-on-Sea | |
| D-819 | Noamh Dubhan | 2018– | Fethard | |
| D-820 | Frances Mary Corscaden | 2018–2019 | Barry Dock (SAR BB) | |
| D-820 | Frances Mary Corscaden | 2019– | Barry Dock | |
| D-821 | Sheena | 2018– | Troon | |
| D-822 | Spirit of Penarth II | 2018– | Penarth | |
| D-823 | Clann Lir | 2018– | Ballyglass | |
| D-824 | Barbara Jane | 2018– | Horton and Port Eynon | |
| D-825 | Enfys 2 | 2018– | Moelfre | |
| D-826 | Barbara Anne Bennett | 2018–2024 | Relief Fleet | |
| D-826 | Barbara Anne Bennett | 2024– | Bude | |
| D-827 | Flt Lt John Buckley RAF | 2018– | Selsey | |
| D-828 | Grace Darling | 2018– | Seahouses | |
| D-829 | Little Susie | 2018– | Tynemouth | |
| D-830 | Buoy Woody - 85N | 2018– | Aberdeen | Named after one of the men killed in the crash of Bond Offshore Helicopters Flight 85N |
| D-831 | Unnamed | 2018– | Jersey Fire and Rescue Service | |
| D-832 | The Adrian Beaumont | 2018– | Weston-super-Mare | |
| D-833 | Sheila MacDonald | 2018– | Stranraer | |
| D-834 | Oor Lifesaver | 2019– | Broughty Ferry | |
| D-835 | Richard Francis | 2019– | Hastings | |
| D-836 | Marjorie Boneham | 2019–2024 | Relief Fleet | |
| D-836 | Marjorie Boneham | 2024– | Dunmore East (Demo) | |
| D-837 | Mary Beal | 2019– | Withernsea | |
| D-838 | Dudley Jane | 2019– | Dart | |
| D-839 | Skpr James Ballard RNVR DSC | 2019– | Craster | |
| D-840 | Marian and Alan Clayton | 2019– | St Davids | |
| D-841 | Alfred Alexander Staden | 2019– | Margate | |
| D-842 | The Holland Family | 2019– | Skegness | |
| D-843 | Pride of Port Isaac (Goeth Porthusek) | 2019– | Port Isaac | |
| D-844 | David Lauder | 2019– | Dunbar | |
| D-845 | John Darbyshire | 2019– | Cardigan | |
| D-846 | Frank | 2020– | Courtown | |
| D-847 | Exmoor Belle | 2020– | Minehead | |
| D-848 | Craig Morris | 2020– | Port Talbot | |
| D-849 | Damar's Pride | 2020– | Clacton-on-Sea | |
| D-850 | The Dennis Faro | 2020– | Portsmouth | Community funded boat, named after ex-crewman "Dennis Faro", Portsmouth's most decorated lifeboatman, a twice bronze medal recipient |
| D-851 | Deborah Brown III | 2020–2022 | Ilfracombe | |
| D-852 | Ernie Wellings | 2021– | Bridlington | |
| D-853 | Harbet | 2021– | Fleetwood | |
| D-854 | Ronnie Sinclair | 2021– | Kippford | |
| D-855 | Brenda Raworth | 2021– | Morecambe | |
| D-856 | John Wesley Hillard IV | 2021– | Scarborough | |
| D-857 | Buzz II | 2021– | Relief fleet | |
| D-858 | Kathleen Ann | 2021– | Tenby | |
| D-859 | The Rotarian | 2021– | Filey | |
| D-860 | Lizzie | 2022– | Fenit | |
| D-861 | Hugo Missen | 2022– | Porthcawl | |
| D-862 | Phyllis Rowan | 2022– | Blackpool | |
| D-863 | Lizzie Hook | 2022 | Relief fleet | |
| D-863 | Deborah Brown III | 2022– | Ilfracombe | |
| D-864 | Blackpool Endeavour | 2022– | Blackpool | |
| D-865 | Joval | 2022– | Dún Laoghaire | |
| D-866 | Raymond and Dorothy Billingham | 2022– | Barrow | |
| D-867 | Alf and Dora Whiting | 2022– | Amble | |
| D-868 | Mr Eric Sharpe | 2022– | Cromer | |
| D-869 | Lizzie Hook | 2022– | Relief fleet | |
| D-870 | Leonard Mills | 2022– | Campbeltown | |
| D-871 | The Ken Blair | 2022– | Portrush | |
| D-872 | Ollie Naismith II | 2022– | Looe | |
| D-873 | Frank Martin | 2023– | Port St Mary | |
| D-874 | Alderman Penny Shelton | 2023– | Teddington | |
| D-875 | The Gentle JEKM | 2023– | Relief fleet | |
| D-876 | The David H | 2023– | Eastbourne | |
| D-877 | Sheila | 2023– | Eyemouth | |
| D-878 | Sally Forth | 2023– | Blyth | |
| D-879 | Thee Andy Cantle | 2023– | Sunderland | |
| D-880 | David Radcliffe | 2023– | Calshot | |
| D-881 | Dorothy Mills | 2023– | Relief fleet | |
| D-882 | Williams and Cole | 2023– | Burry Port | |
| D-883 | Leonard Pownall | 2023– | West Kirby | |
| D-884 | Roy Norgrove | 2023– | Swanage | |
| D-885 | Clive and Imelda Rawlings II | 2024– | Trearddur Bay | |
| D-886 | Will Morgan | 2024– | New Quay | |
| D-887 | Dorothy and Katherine Barr III | 2024– | Relief fleet | |
| D-888 | Ronald and Marjorie Stanley Taylor | 2024 | Bude | |
| D-888 | Ronald and Marjorie Stanley Taylor | 2025– | Relief fleet | |
| D-889 | James and Deanna Adams | 2024– | Cleethorpes | |
| D-890 | Bill Hall | 2024– | Relief fleet | |
| D-891 | Sunijo | 2024– | North Berwick | |
| D-892 | mintybell | 2024– | Arbroath | |
| D-893 | Annie Lizzie | 2024– | Borth | |
| D-894 | Clive Dibbin | 2024– | Relief fleet | |
| D-895 | Hugh, Maureen and Heather Pope | 2024– | Mumbles | |
| D-896 | Arangy | 2024– | Sennen Cove | |
| D-897 | Margaret Olive | 2025– | Montrose | |
| D-898 | Eric and John Hislop | 2025– | Conwy | |
| D-899 | Swaine-Legane | 2025– | Little and Broad Haven | |

=== D-900 – D-999 ===
| Op. No. | Name | In service | Station (Note: (Brackets) used to signify that a boat is assigned to a specific station, but isn't yet at that location.) | Comments |
|---|---|---|---|---|
| D-900 | Glenis Joan Felstead | 2025– | Berwick-upon-Tweed | |
| D-901 | James R Allen | 2025– | Workington | |
| D-902 | Spirit of Fidelity | 2025– | Littlehampton | |
| D-903 | Geoff Pearce | 2025– | Rhyl | |
| D-904 | Sue Sorotos | 2025– | Southend-on-Sea | |
| D-905 | PJS | 2025– | Rock | |
| D-906 | Richard Peter McFarland | 2025– | Inshore Lifeboat Centre | |
| D-907 | Richmond | 2025– | Newquay | |
| D-908 | Cameronian | 2025– | Newcastle | |
| D-909 | The Peter Dixon | 2025– | Relief fleet | |
| D-910 | Sanctuary | 2026– | Relief fleet | |
| D-911 | Challenge | 2026– | Relief fleet | |
| D-912 | Sue | 2026– | Bembridge | |
| D-913 | The John Dodd | 2026– | Hayling Island | |
| D-914 | The Grace Trust | 2026– | Relief fleet | |
| D-915 | Emma Vosper | 2026– | Tramore | |
| D-916 | Cill Dara | 2026– | Wexford | |
| D-917 | Hellenic Horizon | tbc | (Larne) | |
| D-918 | Jandy | 2026– | Shoreham Harbour | |
| D-919 | | tbc | (Teddington) | |
| D-920 | | tbc | (Redcar) | |
| D-921 | | tbc | (St Agnes) | |
| D-922 | | tbc | (Torbay) | |
| D-923 | | tbc | (Fishguard) | |
| D-924 | | | | |
| D-925 | | | | |
