= Craster Lifeboat Station =

RNLI Lifeboat station in Northumberland, England

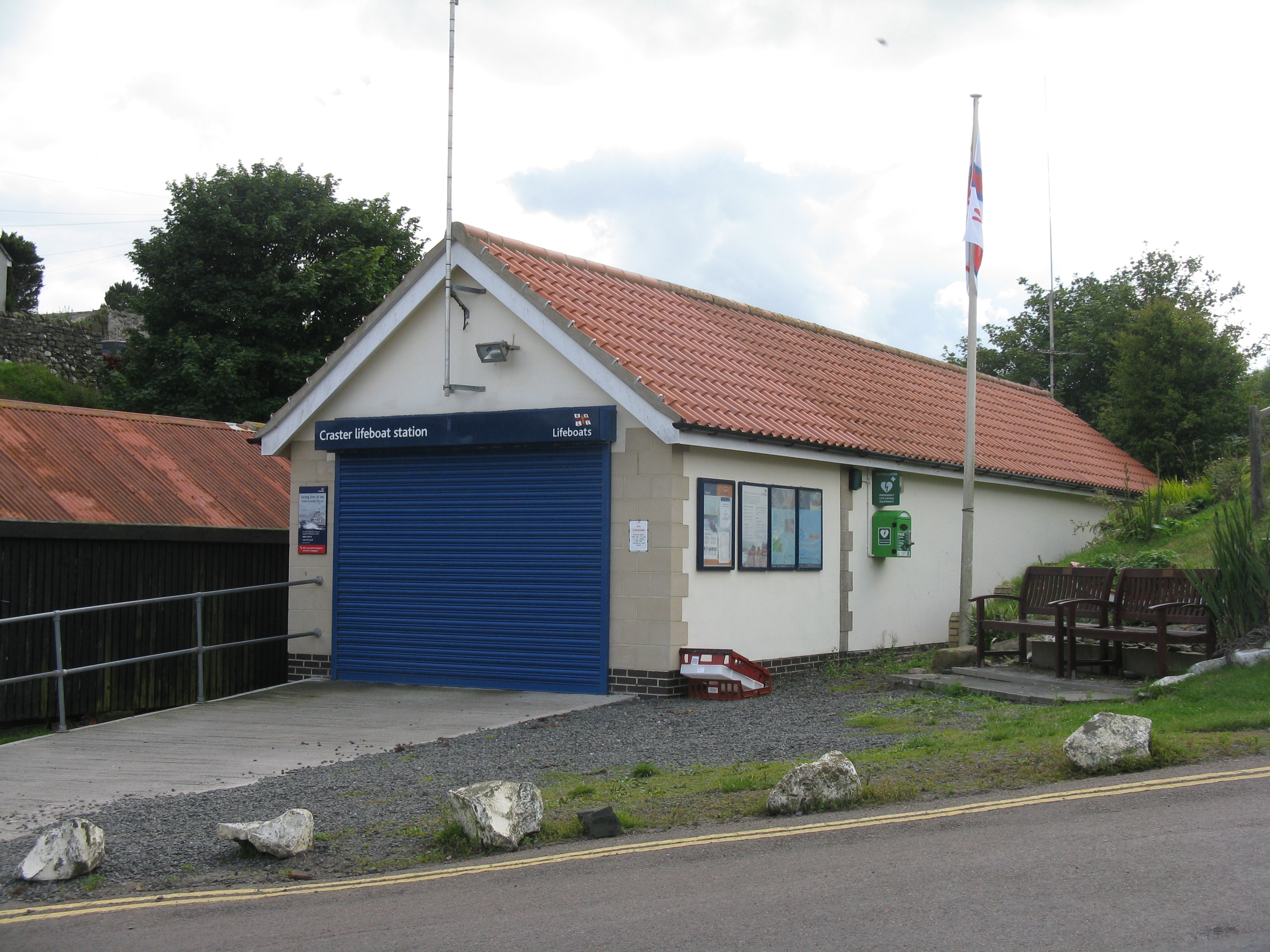
- Craster Lifeboat Station

- Location within Northumberland

General information
- Type: RNLI Lifeboat Station
- Location: West End, Craster, Northumberland, England
- Coordinates: 55°28′21.6″N 1°35′38.6″W
- Opened: August 1969
- Owner: Royal National Lifeboat Institution

Website
- rnli.org/find-my-nearest/lifeboat-stations/craster-lifeboat-station

Craster Lifeboat Station is located at West End, in the small harbour village of Craster, situated mid-way between Seahouses and Amble, on the coast of Northumberland, England.

An Inshore lifeboat was first stationed in Craster by the Royal National Lifeboat Institution (RNLI) in August 1969.

The station currently operates a D-class (IB1) Inshore lifeboat, Skpr James Ballard RNVR DSC (D-839), on station since 2019.

== History ==
In 1964, in response to an increasing amount of water-based leisure activity, the RNLI placed 25 small fast Inshore lifeboats around the country. These were easily launched with just a few people, ideal to respond quickly to local emergencies.

More stations were opened, and in August 1969, a lifeboat station was established at Craster, with the arrival of a D-class (RFD PB16) Inshore lifeboat, the unnamed (D-130). In 1975, D-130 was replaced with a new D-class (Zodiac III) lifeboat, D-228.

In July 1977, a harbour fete day was organised in aid of Craster RNLI Lifeboat Station. The star guest was stage and screen actress Joyce Grenfell, maybe most well known for her role as Police Constable Ruby Gates, in the St Trinian's film trilogy. A total sum of £1,531 was raised on the day, including £16 raised by Mrs Grenfell signing autographs.

On Saturday, 1 May 1982, the lifeboat was launched at 11:10, to the aid of a crew of a fishing boat, who had moored their vessel. They had tried to row the boat's rowing boat ashore in gale force 7 conditions, but had been blown onto the rocks at Newton Haven, 4 miles (6.4 km) north of Craster. The RAF Search and Rescue helicopter was also called, but it was decided to rescue the men by lifeboat. With great skill, Helm Neil Robson guided the Inshore lifeboat to the rowing boat, and the three men were recovered to Newton Haven Bay. At 12:40, the lifeboat was launched again with the same crew, to reports of a single man in the water after his dinghy capsized, also at Newton Haven. Unable to locate anyone, the lifeboat beached, but were told the man had made it safely ashore. For their service that day, Neil Robson and Keith Williams were each presented with a 'Framed Letter of Thanks signed by the Chairman of the Institution'.

On 3 February 1999, a new D-class (EA16) lifeboat was provided to the station, funded by John Bagley, who had raised over £16,000 from a series of talks and presentations, about his adventures taking part in the British Steel Challenge Round the World yacht race. His grandson Adam Bagley, aged just two-and-a-half, became the youngest person to name a lifeboat, which was duly named AB-One (D-542)

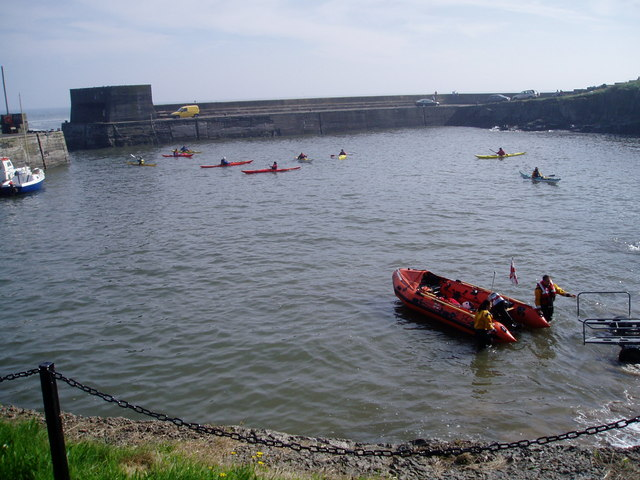
Recovery of Craster lifeboat AB-One (D-542)

The latest D-class (IB1) Inshore lifeboat to be placed at Craster arrived in 2019. At a naming ceremony on Saturday 12 October, the boat was named Skpr James Ballard RNVR DSC (D-839), in memory of the captain of an armoured trawler, that had captured German sailors off the north east coast of Scotland in World War I. The boat was funded from the legacy of Charles B. Campbell.

== Station honours ==
The following are awards made at Craster.

- A Framed Letter of Thanks signed by the Chairman of the Institution

A. Neil Robson, Helm – 1982
J. Keith Williams, crew member – 1982

== Craster lifeboats ==
Op.No. (Note: Op. No. is the RNLI's Operational Number of the boat or vehicle carried on the hull.)	Name	On station	Class	Comments
D-130	Unnamed	1969–1975	D-class (RFD PB16)	
D-228	Unnamed	1975–1982	D-class (Zodiac III)	
D-290	Unnamed	1983–1989	D-class (Zodiac III)	
D-395	Bob	1990–1999	D-class (EA16)	
D-542	AB-One	1999–2008	D-class (EA16)	
D-703	Joseph Hughes	2008–2019	D-class (IB1)	
D-839	Skpr James Ballard RNVR DSC	2019–	D-class (IB1)	

== See also ==
- List of RNLI stations
- List of former RNLI stations
- Royal National Lifeboat Institution lifeboats
