= Cullercoats Lifeboat Station =

RNLI Lifeboat station in Tyne and Wear, England

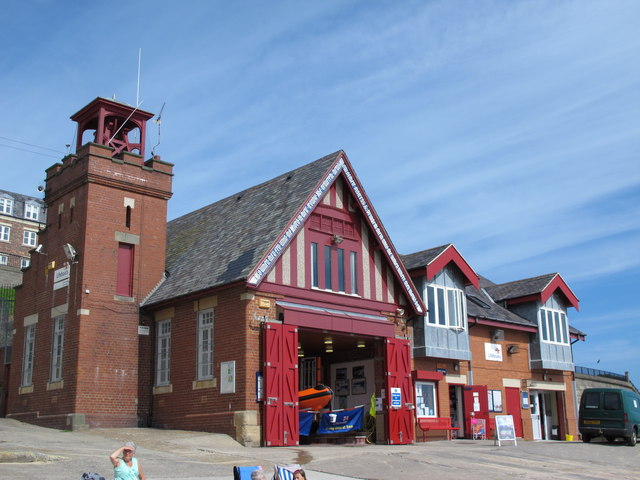
- Cullercoats Lifeboat Station

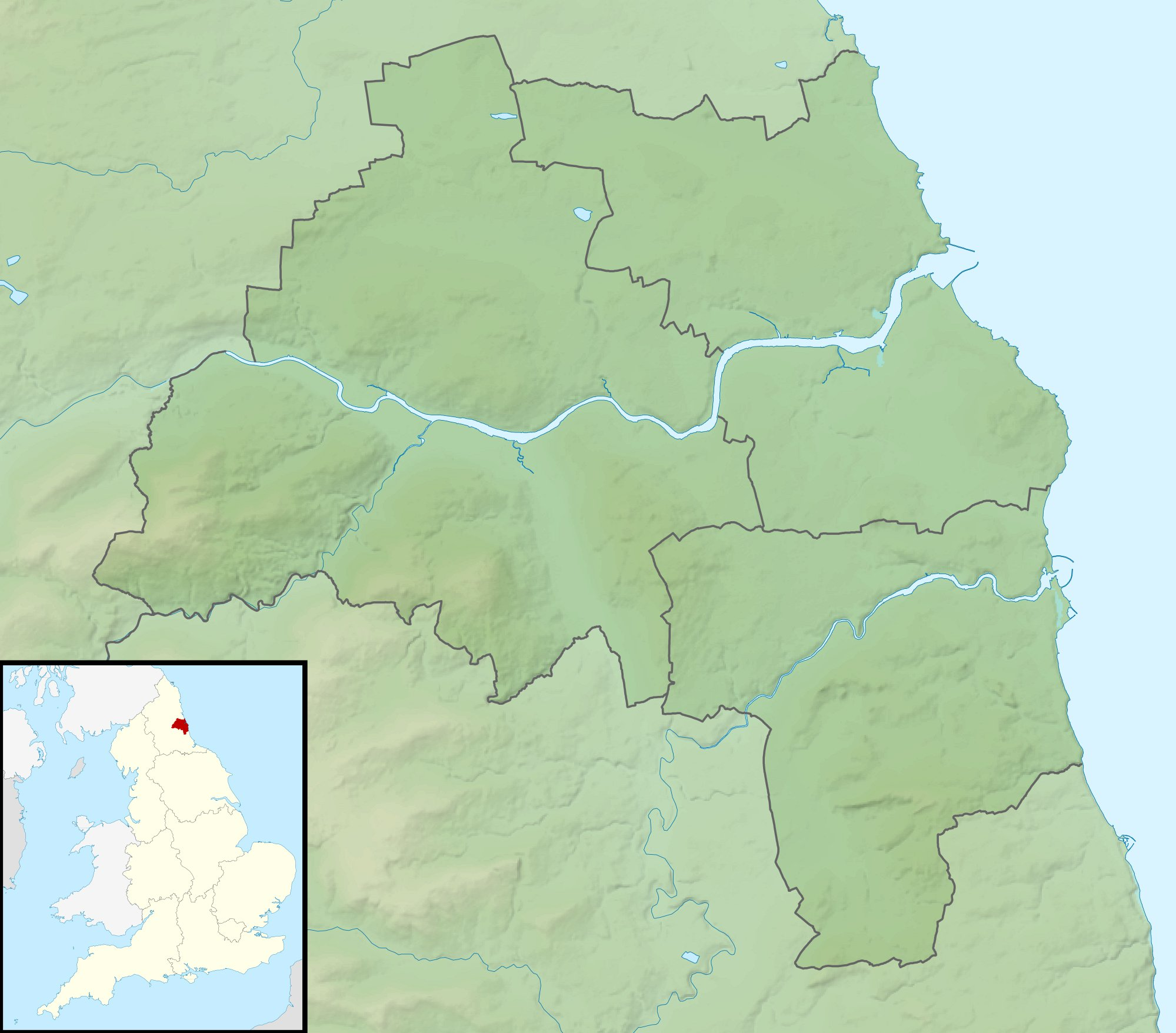
- Location within Tyne and Wear

General information
- Type: RNLI Lifeboat Station
- Location: Cullercoats Lifeboat Station, Cullercoats Harbour, North Side, Cullercoats, Tyne and Wear, NE30 4PZ, UK
- Coordinates: 55°02′07.7″N 1°25′55.3″W
- Opened: 1852
- Owner: Royal National Lifeboat Institution

Website
- Cullercoats RNLI Lifeboat Station

Listed Building – Grade II
- Feature: Cullercoats Lifeboat Station (1896)
- Designated: 22 March 2013
- Reference no.: 1411983

Cullercoats Lifeboat Station is located on the north side of Cullercoats Harbour, in Cullercoats, North Tyneside, a town which sits 2 miles (3.2 km) north of the mouth of the River Tyne, in the county of Tyne and Wear.

A lifeboat station was established at Cullercoats by the Royal National Institution for the Preservation of Life from Shipwreck (RNIPLS) in 1852, which became the Royal National Lifeboat Institution (RNLI) in 1854.

The Cullercoats lifeboat station currently operates a B-class (Atlantic 85) Inshore lifeboat Daddy's Girl (B-935), on station since 2022.

== History ==
In 1852, Algernon Percy, 4th Duke of Northumberland, president of the RNIPLS, made funds available for the provision of a lifeboat at Cullercoats. A 36-foot long, 15-foot wide, stone-built boathouse was constructed, also at the expense of the Duke. A modified lifeboat, based on the prize-winning design of James Beeching, was constructed by James Peake, Master Shipwright at Woolwich Royal Naval Dockyard, and a carriage to transport the boat was designed by Col. Colquhoun, RA, Master-General of Ordnance. Both lifeboat and carriage arrived in Cullercoats on 3 September 1852, the boat being named Percy in honour of the Duke.

By 1858, Percy was found to be suffering from dry rot. A replacement 32-foot 10-oared Peake-class lifeboat was ordered from Forrestt of Limehouse, London, costing £174, and requiring a larger carriage, costing a further £80-5s-0d. Costs were again funded by the Duke of Northumberland, and the boat was once again named Percy.

A replacement boathouse was constructed in 1866 to accommodate the larger 33-foot lifeboat Palmerston. Thirty years later, a third boathouse was constructed in 1896. A brick structure, it was built on the site of the 1866 boathouse, and cost £750. Funded by the Co-operative wholesale society, who had also funded a lifeboat Co-operator No.1 (ON 5) in 1884, it was opened on 8 August 1896 by Mr Tweedell, chairman of the Newcastle branch of the Society. It is still in use to this day, and is grade II listed by Historic England.

The era of Pulling and Sailing lifeboats (those with oars and sails) at Cullercoats came to an end in 1937, with the arrival of a Liverpool-class motor-powered lifeboat (which would also still have sails), the Richard Silver Oliver (ON 794). The boat had a single 35-hp engine, delivering a speed of 7.33 knots, and cost £3,684. After 85 years, this would also be the first non-self-righting lifeboat at Cullercoats, which 2 years later would prove very costly.

On a training exercise in 1939, the lifeboat was capsized off Sharpness Point. 6 crewmen were lost, including the Coxswain and the Honorary Secretary. The remaining crew refused to use another non-self-righting lifeboat, and the station was closed until the arrival of a self-righting boat in 1940.

Following a coastal review in 1968, with All-weather lifeboats at flanking stations Blyth and Tynemouth, and with a D-class Inshore lifeboat at Cullercoats since 1965, the RNLI decided to withdraw the Cullercoats All-weather lifeboat. 37-08 Sir James Knott (ON 975) was formally withdrawn on 4 May 1969, being transferred first to the relief fleet, and then to Redcar in 1972. Over the following years, the D-class lifeboats would be replaced with a larger twin engine C-class lifeboat, and then in 1991, a B-class (Atlantic 21).

== Station honours ==
The following are awards made at Cullercoats.

- RNIPLS Silver Medal
  Alexander Donkin – 1827
  (The medal for this service was stolen and a new medal was re-issued in 1833).
  John Redford, Coxswain – 1853
- RNLI Silver Medal
  Andrew Taylor, Coxswain – 1898
- The Thanks of the Institution inscribed on Vellum
  Major William Adamson, Honorary Secretary – 1886
  Brian Gould, Helm – 1995
  Robert Oliver, Helm – 1996
  Robert Oliver, Helm – 2012
- The Walter and Elizabeth Groombridge Award 1996
  (for the outstanding inshore lifeboat rescue of the year)
  Robert Oliver, Helm – 1997
- A Framed Letter of Thanks signed by the Chairman of the Institution
  Mark Charlton, crew member – 1996
  David Pendlington, crew member – 1996
  Robert Oliver – 2010
  Peter Clark – 2010
  Grahame Wood – 2010
  Gary Hawksford – 2010
  Grahame Wood, crew member – 2012
  Stephen Potts, crew member – 2012
- Exceptional First Aid Certificate
  Ross Dun, crew member – 2011
  Grahame Wood, crew member – 2011
- Member, Order of the British Empire (MBE)
  Raymond James Taylor, Honorary Secretary – 1995
- British Empire Medal
  Geoffrey Cowan, Community Safety Officer – 2020

== Roll of honour ==
In memory of those lost whilst serving Cullercoats lifeboat.

- Lost when Liverpool-class lifeboat Richard Silver Oliver (ON 794), a non-self-righting lifeboat, capsized on exercise, 22 April 1939
  George Brunton, Coxswain (45)
  John Redford Armstrong, Second Coxswain (44)
  John Leonard Abel, Motor Mechanic (36)
  John Heddon Scott, Assistant Mechanic (33)
  Lt. Cmdr. Lionel E. R. Blakeney-Booth, RN, Honorary Secretary (43)
  Kenneth L. Biggar, naval cadet (16)

== Cullercoats lifeboats ==
=== Pulling and Sailing (P&S) lifeboats ===
ON (Note: ON is the RNLI's Official Number of the boat.)	Name	Built	On Station	Class	Comments
Pre-250	Percy	1852	1852–1859	30-foot Self-righting Peake (P&S)	(Note: 30-foot x 8-foot (12-oared) Peake-class self-righting (P&S) lifeboat, funded by The Duke of Northumberland, built by James Peake of HM Dockyard, Woolwich.)
Pre-351	Percy	1859	1859–1865	32-foot Self-righting Peake (P&S)	(Note: 32-foot x 7-foot 9in (10-oared) Peake-class self-righting (P&S) lifeboat, funded by The Duke of Northumberland, built by Forrestt of Limehouse, London, costing £174.)
Pre-452	Palmerston	1866	1866–1884	33-foot Self-righting (P&S)	(Note: 33-foot x 8-foot (10-oared) self-righting (P&S) lifeboat, gift of Mr P. Reid of London, built by Forrestt of Limehouse, London, costing £275.)
5	Co-operator No.1	1884	1884–1907	37-foot 1in Self-righting (P&S)	(Note: 37-foot 1in x 8-foot (12-oared) self-righting (P&S) lifeboat, funded by the Manchester Central Co-operative Society, built by Forrestt of Limehouse, London, costing £388.)
571	Co-operator No.1	1907	1907–1937	37-foot 6in Self-righting (P&S)	(Note: 37-foot 6in x 8-foot 6in (12-oared) self-righting (P&S) lifeboat, funded by the Manchester Central Co-operative Society, built by Thames Ironworks of Blackwall, London, costing £879.)

Pre ON numbers are unofficial numbers used by the Lifeboat Enthusiasts' Society to reference early lifeboats not included on the official RNLI list.

=== Motor lifeboats ===
ON	Op. No. (Note: Op. No. is the RNLI's Operational Number of the boat carried on the hull.)	Name	Built	On station	Class	Comments
794	–	Richard Silver Oliver	1937	1937–1939	Liverpool	(Note: Capsized on exercise, 1939, with the loss of six crew. The station was closed until 1940.)
Station Closed 1939–1940
727	–	Westmorland	1930	1940–1951	35-foot 6in Self-righting (motor)	Previously at Berwick-upon-Tweed
880	–	Isaac and Mary Bolton	1950	1951–1963	35-foot 6in Self-righting (motor)	
975	37-08	Sir James Knott	1963	1963–1969	Oakley	

All-weather lifeboat withdrawn in 1969

=== Inshore lifeboats ===
==== D-class and C-class ====
Op. No.	Name	On station	Class	Comments
D-50	Unnamed	1965	D-class (RFD PB16)	
D-87	Unnamed	1966–1968	D-class (RFD PB16)	
D-100	Unnamed	1969–1974	D-class (RFD PB16)	
D-229	Unnamed	1975–1984	D-class (Zodiac III)	
C-512	Unnamed	1984–1991	C-class (Zodiac Grand Raid)	formerly D-512

==== B-class ====
Op. No.	Name	On station	Class	Comments
B-514	Guide Friendship 1	1991–1992	B-class (Atlantic 21)	
B-591	Edmund and Joan White	1992–2006	B-class (Atlantic 21)	
B-590	Wolverson X-Ray	2006–2007	B-class (Atlantic 21)	
B-811	Hylton Burdon	2007–2022	B-class (Atlantic 85)	
B-935	Daddy's Girl	2022–	B-class (Atlantic 85)	

=== Launch and recovery tractors ===
Op. No.	Reg. No.	Type	On station	Comments
T19	TY 2547	Clayton	1949–1951	
T5	IJ 3424	Clayton	1951–1954	
T14	XW 2075	Clayton	1954–1955	
T35	FYM 558	Case L	1955–1963	
T71	519 GYM	Case 1000D	1963–1969	
TW18H	H710 RUX	Talus MB-4H Hydrostatic Mk1.5	1991–1993	
TW22H	K501 AUX	Talus MB-4H Hydrostatic Mk2	1993–2004	
TW21H	J495 XUJ	Talus MB-4H Hydrostatic Mk2	2004–2017	
TW59H	DU04 DVW	Talus MB-4H Hydrostatic Mk2	2017–	

== See also ==
- List of RNLI stations
- List of former RNLI stations
- Royal National Lifeboat Institution lifeboats
