= RNLB Guide of Dunkirk =

History

British RNLI Flag
- Name: Guide of Dunkirk
- Owner: Royal National Lifeboat Institution (RNLI)
- Builder: Rowhedge Iron Works
- Official Number: ON 826
- Station: Cadgwith
- Laid down: 1940
- Launched: 1940
- Renamed: Guide of Dunkirk; Girl Guide
- Status: Private ownership

General characteristics
- Displacement: 8 tons
- Length: 35 ft 6 in (10.82 m)
- Beam: 9 ft 8 in (2.95 m)
- Draft: 2 ft 9 in (0.84 m)
- Propulsion: 72hp diesel

RNLB Guide of Dunkirk (ON 826) is a 35ft 6in Self-righting motor-class lifeboat whose construction was funded by the Girl Guides in 1940. She was self-righting and designed for launching from a beach. As one of the Little Ships of Dunkirk she was used in the evacuation of Allied soldiers from Dunkirk in World War II. Between 1941 and 1963 she was stationed in Cadgwith, UK as a lifeboat. In 1963 she passed into private ownership.

== Before Dunkirk ==
The £5,000 needed to buy a lifeboat was one of the targets of the Guide Gift Week appeal of 1940. Money was donated by Guides throughout the British Empire from their salaries or, for those too young to work, by earning money doing odd jobs.

Guide of Dunkirk was built by Rowhedge Ironworks near Colchester, UK, and was unnamed when she was called into service straight from the builder's yard for the Dunkirk evacuation on 1 June 1940. She had the designation ON 826.

== Dunkirk ==
At the Dunkirk evacuation, she made two crossings. Her crew was made up of men from Walton-on-the-Naze and Frinton-on-Sea, Essex, under British Naval command.

On her first trip, she was used to ferry soldiers off the beaches to larger ships waiting offshore. She was badly damaged by machine gun fire and a rope became wrapped around her propeller. She was towed back to England stern first.

On her second trip, she was hit by shellfire and extensively damaged.

== After Dunkirk ==
In May 1941 she was stationed at Cadgwith in Cornwall as a Royal National Lifeboat Institution (RNLI) lifeboat. In 1947 she was named Guide of Dunkirk in honour of her history so far.

In 1963, the Cadgwith lifeboat station was closed and Guide of Dunkirk was sold into the private ownership of John Moor and renamed Girl Guide.

== Retirement ==
The boat is now ashore in Mevagissey, Cornwall and has remained in her original condition as when she left RNLI service.

== See also ==
- Historic RNLI Lifeboats
