= Clayton RNLI tractor =

RNLI Amphibious launch tractor

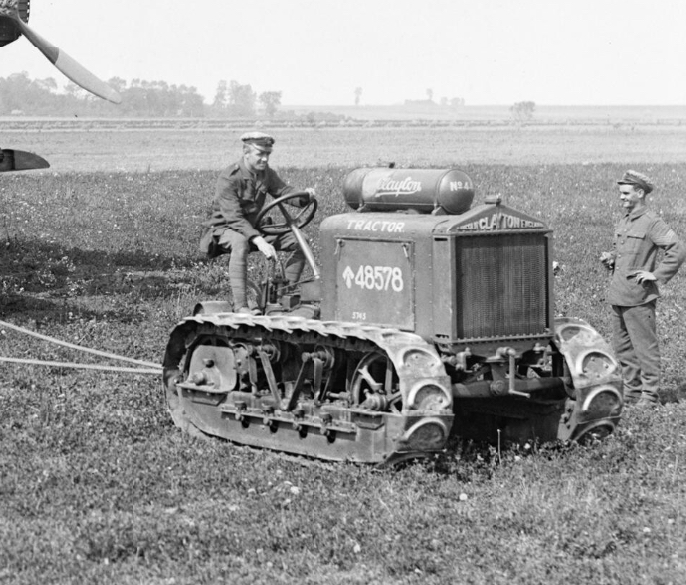
- Clayton Chain-rail tractor in World War I
- Manufacturer: Clayton & Shuttleworth
- Production: 18 (1921–1927)
- Weight: 3 tonnes
- Propulsion: Tracks with 14" track pads
- Engine model: Clayton 35-hp
- Gross power: 35 hp (26 kW)
- Drawbar pull: 4,500 lb (2,000 kg)
- Speed: 6 mph (9.7 km/h)
- Preceded by: none
- Succeeded by: Four Wheel Drive Lorry Company (FWD)

The Clayton RNLI tractor was a continuous track amphibious launch tractor, specifically adapted for the Royal National Lifeboat Institution (RNLI), to launch and recover carriage mounted lifeboats, from beach-launched lifeboat stations.

A total of 18 tractors were constructed by Clayton & Shuttleworth of Stamp End Works, Lincoln, between 1921 and 1927. A further three were never completed.

== History ==
Following the end of World War I, the RNLI turned its attention to making it easier to launch shore based lifeboats. The use of horses for farming was in decline, and it was becoming increasingly difficult, and more costly, to find a team of horses and men to help launch the lifeboat, causing unacceptable delays.

At a meeting of the RNLI committee of management in January 1920, it was decided to trial a caterpillar tractor, of a type which had proven itself during World War I. Taking advice from Mr F. A. Standen of St Ives, Cambridgeshire, a name now synonymous with agricultural machinery, a 35-hp Clayton Chain-rail tractor was chosen for evaluation.

Five days of trials commenced on Friday 26 March 1920, taking place at Hunstanton, where a variety of type of beach could be found. The tractor performed above all expectations on the first day. On day two, the tractor had no problems towing a 7-ton 3-cwt load, in the form of a 35 ft (11 m) lifeboat and carriage, at its top speed of 6 mph (9.7 km/h), over the sandy beach. However, difficulties were encountered on day three whilst attempting to traverse the sand dunes, resolved following the fitting of six "spuds" (grouser) to each of the tracks.

Things didn't quite go to plan on day four, as the 'un-marinised' tractor unit became waterlogged, after the flywheel covered the engine in seawater, during an attempted launch. As the tide receded some hours later, the tractor was drawn to higher ground by some 70–80 people, where repairs took place. Tractors would be made "seaworthy" with only a few modifications, the magneto and carburettor enclosed in a water-tight compartment, water-tight spark-plug terminals, a splash guard for the flywheel, and the exhaust pipe protruding the bonnet.

Final day trials took place at on the shingle shore at Heacham, proving the expected result that the unit was not suited to such terrain, requiring further investigation for a tractor suited to those conditions and stations.

Following these "successful" trials, the RNLI placed an order for 20 tractors with Clayton & Shuttleworth. The first tractor (T1) was trialled on 23 February 1921 at St Ives; The now waterproof plug terminals giving no problems, and tests in the River Ouse successfully submerged the magneto box to a depth of 4 ft (1.2 m).

A second unit (T2), fitted with tracks with rubber pads, was easily drawn across London from the Poplar storage facility to the RNLI Annual General Meeting at Central Hall, Westminster, where it was inspected by the then Prince of Wales. However, later trials at Hoylake still proved unsatisfactory, prompting further development work on track design.

On 11 February 1923, the Donna Nook lifeboat was launched twice, to the steam trawler Dinorah. It was estimated that the use of the tractor saved at least three hours of launch time. Just 15 days later, the Bridlington lifeboat was drawn 1.5 mi (2.4 km) along the shore by the tractor, when the water in the harbour was too low to launch.

Just 18 Clayton tractors were completed for the RNLI. The company of Clayton & Shuttleworth failed in 1928, being taken over by Marshall, Sons & Co. of Gainsborough. However, no further orders were placed. In 1927, the RNLI had placed an order for the next four tractors, a much more powerful unit, with the Four Wheel Drive Lorry Company (FWD) of Slough.

At this time, no examples of the Clayton RNLI tractor are known to survive.

== Clayton RNLI tractor fleet ==
Op. No. (Note: Op. No. is the RNLI's Operational Number carried on the hull.)	Reg No.	Built	In service	Station	Comments
T1	TC 648	1921	1921	Hunstanton	
T1	TC 648	1921	1921	Hoylake	
T1	TC 648	1921	1922–1925	St Annes	
T1	TC 648	1921	1925–1927	Depot	
T2	AH 5933	1921	1921	Hunstanton	
T2	AH 5933	1921	1921	Hoylake	
T2	AH 5933	1921	1922	Llandudno	
T2	AH 5933	1921	1922	Boulmer	
T2	AH 5933	1921	1924–1930	Newburgh	
T2	AH 5933	1921	1930–1938	Depot	
T3	MA 6793	1921	1921–1928	Hoylake	
T3	MA 6793	1921	1928–1931	Depot	
T3	MA 6793	1921	1931–1938	Redcar	
T3	MA 6793	1921	1938–1939	Cromer No. 2	
T4	XA 9192	1923	1923–1931	Hunstanton	
T4	XA 9192	1923	1931	Brooke	
T4	XA 9192	1923	1931–1933	Ramsey	
T4	XA 9192	1923	1933–1938	Cloughey	
T4	XA 9192	1923	1939–1950	Minehead	
T4	XA 9192	1923	1950–1951	Exmouth	
T4	XA 9192	1923	1951–1953	Depot	
T5	IJ 3424	1921	1922–1930	Bridlington	
T5	IJ 3424	1921	1930–1932	Depot	
T5	IJ 3424	1921	1932–1944	Newburgh	
T5	IJ 3424	1921	1944–1947	Aberdeen No.2	
T5	IJ 3424	1921	1947	Newburgh	
T5	IJ 3424	1921	1947–1950	Scarborough	
T5	IJ 3424	1921	1950–1951	Whitby (storage)	
T5	IJ 3424	1921	1951–1954	Cullercoats	
T5	IJ 3424	1921	1954–1955	Depot	
T6	DM 3318	1921	1921–1938	Rhyl	
T7	AF 4215	1921	1921–1923	Newquay	
T7	AF 4215	1921	1924–1932	Newcastle	
T7	AF 4215	1921	1932–1938	Reserve	
T7	AF 4215	1921	1938	Cromer No.2	
T7	AF 4215	1921	1938–1950	Reserve	
T8	AF 4256	1921	1921–1923	Bude	
T8	AF 4256	1921	1923–1925	Depot	
T8	AF 4256	1921	1925–1938	Aberdeen No.2	
T9	BE 9914	1922	1922–1931	Donna Nook	
T9	BE 9914	1922	1931–1937	Filey	
T9	BE 9914	1922	1937–1939	Depot	
T10	AH 9213	1923	1923–1935	Brancaster	
T10	AH 9213	1923	1936–1947	Montrose No.2	
T10	AH 9213	1923	1947–1949	Depot	
T11	BT 4414	1921	1921–1922	Bridlington	
T11	BT 4414	1921	1922–1923	Hunstanton	
T11	BT 4414	1921	1923–1930	Reserve	
T11	BT 4414	1921	1930–1937	Blackpool	
T12	IJ 5658; LLY 75	1924	1924–1933	Cloughey	
T12	IJ 5658; LLY 75	1924	1933–1937	Brooke	
T12	IJ 5658; LLY 75	1924	1937–1938	Blackpool	
T12	IJ 5658; LLY 75	1924	1938–1940	Rhyl	
T12	IJ 5658; LLY 75	1924	1941–1944	Caister	
T12	IJ 5658; LLY 75	1924	1944–1946	Depot	
T12	IJ 5658; LLY 75	1924	1946–1948	Llandudno	
T12	IJ 5658; LLY 75	1924	1948–1950	Exmouth	
T12	IJ 5658; LLY 75	1924	1950–1951	Depot	
T12	IJ 5658; LLY 75	1924	1951–1953	Exmouth	
T12	IJ 5658; LLY 75	1924	1953–1955	Depot	
T13	Number not used				
T14	XW 2075	1925	1925–1932	Port Logan	
T14	XW 2075	1925	1932–1933	Depot	
T14	XW 2075	1925	1933–1946	Llandudno	
T14	XW 2075	1925	1946–1947	Depot	
T14	XW 2075	1925	1947–1950	Montrose No.2	
T14	XW 2075	1925	1952–1954	Whitby (Reserve)	
T14	XW 2075	1925	1954–1955	Cullercoats	
T15	FU 4892	1925	1925–1932	Skegness	
T15	FU 4892	1925	1933–1949	Anstruther	
T15	FU 4892	1925	1949–1950	Sheringham	
T16	YW 3377	1926	1927–1929	Clogherhead	
T16	YW 3377	1926	1930–1932	Bridlington	
T16	YW 3377	1926	1932–1937	Skegness	
T16	YW 3377	1926	1937–1940	Filey	
T16	YW 3377	1926	1940–1942	Runswick	
T16	YW 3377	1926	1942–1944	Depot	
T16	YW 3377	1926	1944–1949	Caister	
T16	YW 3377	1926	1949–1954	Kilmore Quay	
T17	SR 5361	1926	1926–1936	Montrose No.2	
T17	SR 5361	1926	1936–1941	Depot	
T18	PY 7589	1926	1927–1931	Redcar	
T18	PY 7589	1926	1931–1933	Depot	
T18	PY 7589	1926	1933–1938	Ramsey	
T18	PY 7589	1926	1938–1939	Aberdeen No.2	
T18	PY 7589	1926	1939–1942	Aberdeen (Storage)	
T18	PY 7589	1926	1942–1949	Runswick	
T18	PY 7589	1926	1949–1950	Depot	
T19	TY 2547	1927	1927–1930	Boulmer	
T19	TY 2547	1927	1930–1935	Alnmouth	
T19	TY 2547	1927	1936–1939	Wells-next-the-Sea	
T19	TY 2547	1927	1939–1949	Cromer No.2	
T19	TY 2547	1927	1949–1951	Cullercoats	
T20	Believed not built				
T21	Believed not built				
T22	Believed not built				

== See also ==
- New Holland TC45 launch tractor
- Talus MB-764 launch tractor
- Talus MB-H launch tractor
- Talus MB-4H launch tractor
- Talus Atlantic 85 DO-DO launch carriage
- Fowler Challenger III amphibious tractor
