= Exmouth Lifeboat Station =

RNLI lifeboat station in Devon, England

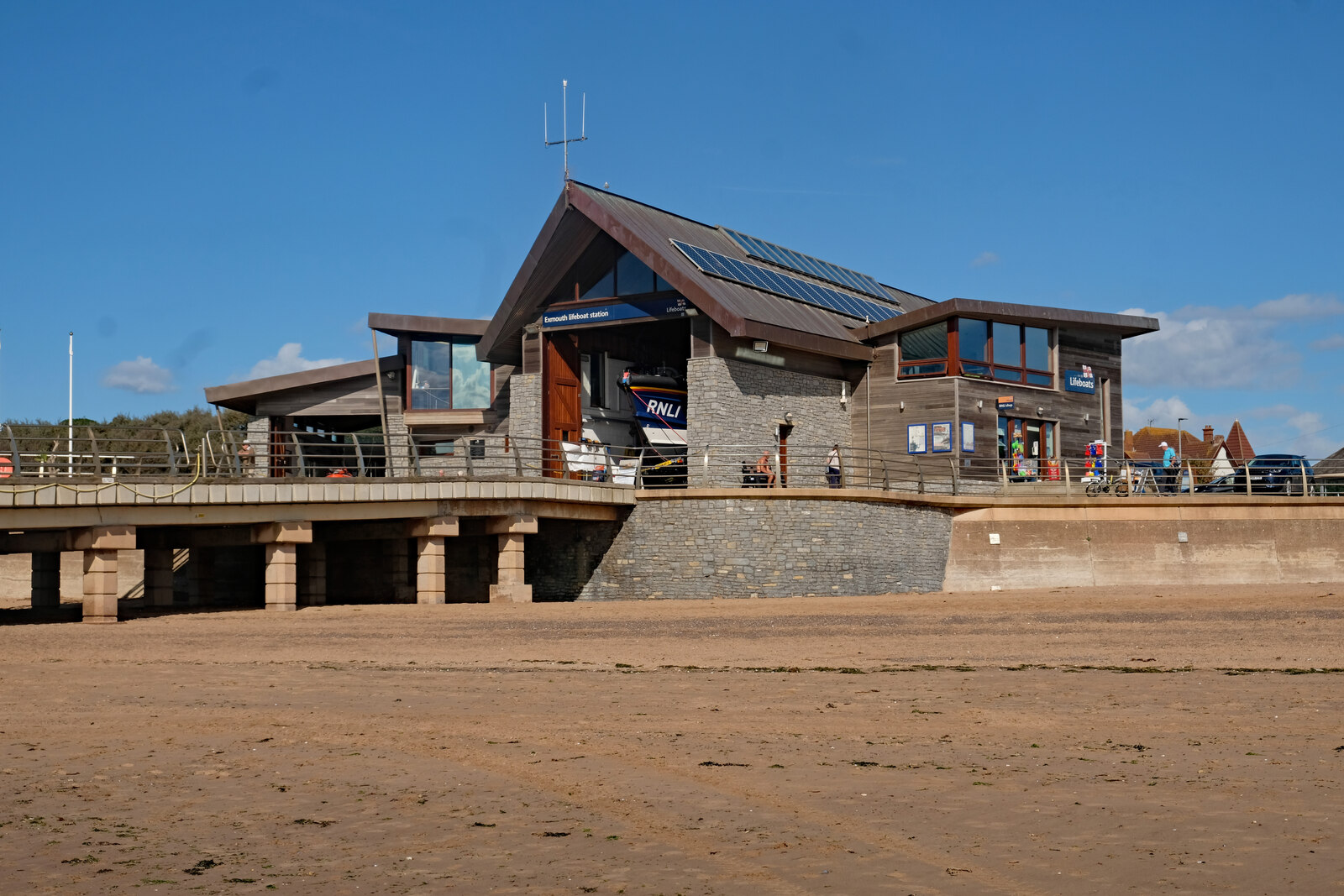
- Exmouth Lifeboat Station in 2022

- Location within Devon

General information
- Type: Lifeboat station
- Location: Queens Drive, Exmouth, Devon, EX8 2AY, England
- Coordinates: 50.611111°N 3.399167°W
- Opened: 1803–1814 first station 1859 second station 2009 present station
- Owner: Royal National Lifeboat Institution

Website
- Exmouth RNLI Lifeboat Station

Exmouth Lifeboat Station can be found overlooking Maer Rocks Beach, off Queens Drive, in Exmouth, a port town and seaside resort on the eastern shore of the River Exe estuary, approximately 11 miles (18 km) south-east of the City of Exeter, on the south-east coast of the county of Devon, England.

The first lifeboat was stationed in the town in 1803. The station was re-established by the Royal National Lifeboat Institution (RNLI) in 1859.

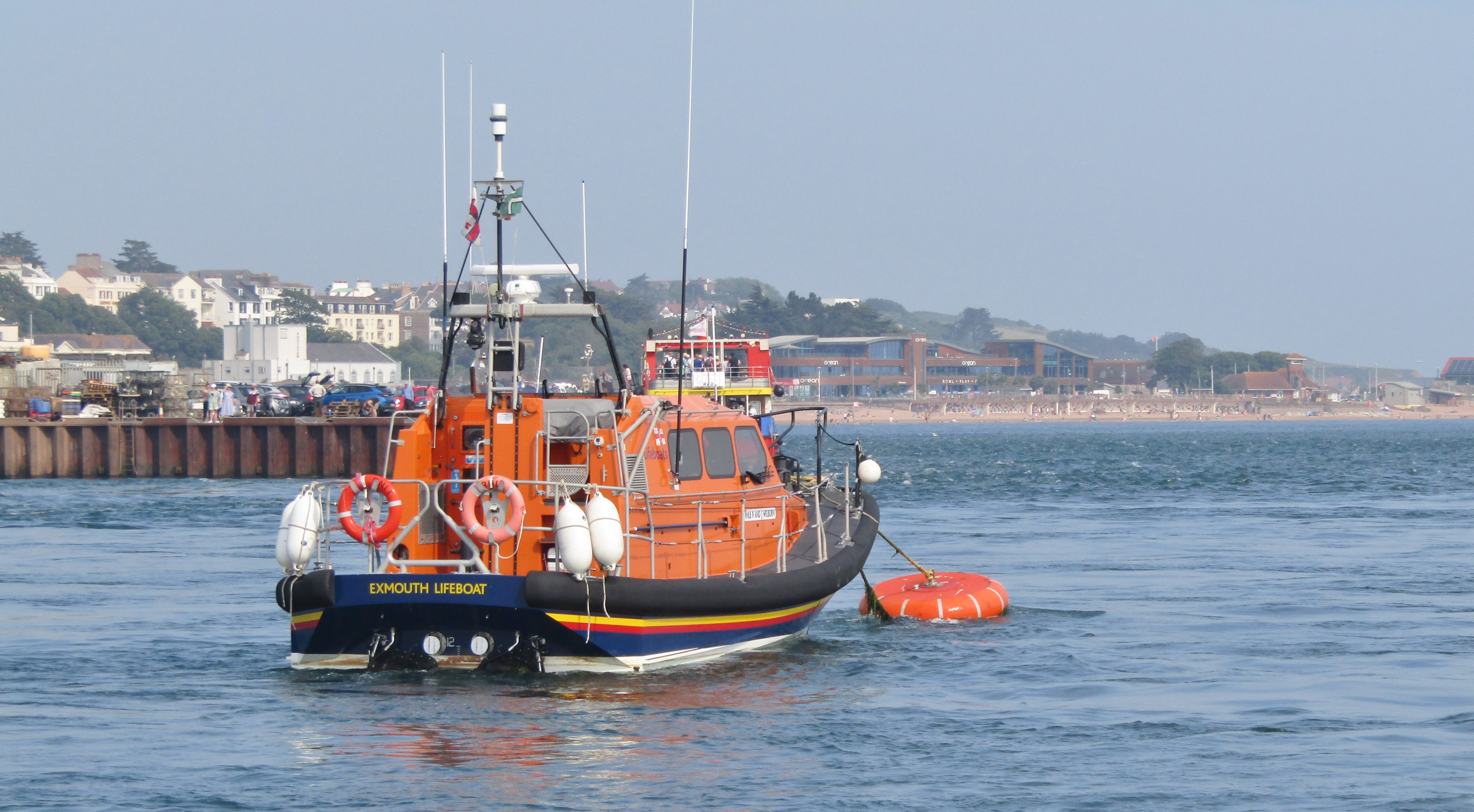
Shannon-class All-weather lifeboat 13-03 R. and J. Welburn (ON 1310)

The station currently operates a Shannon-class All-weather lifeboat, 13-03 R and J Welburn (ON 1310), on station since 2014, and the much smaller D-class (IB1) Inshore lifeboat, George Bearman II (D-805), on station since 2017.

== History ==
Vessels trying to reach Topsham and Exeter have to negotiate the sandbanks at the mouth of the River Exe. Local people at Exmouth raised funds, and with a generous donation from Lord Rolle, and a £50 donation from Lloyd's of London, a lifeboat costing £150 was purchased from Henry Greathead of South Shields in 1803. No records of any service have been found, and it is thought the lifeboat was removed from service, or possibly condemned, after the boathouse near Passage House was washed away in a storm in 1814.

On 6 December 1830, the brig Unity was driven ashore at Exmouth, whilst on passage to Barmouth from London. After the Manby rocket line broke, Lt. John Sergeant entered the water with a rope, and with the assistance of two of his crew and local help, the seven crew of the Unity were saved. Sargeant was awarded the RNIPLS Silver Medal. Just over 20 years later, pilot Thomas Pincomb was also awarded the RNIPLS silver medal. The brig Maria was damaged by a sudden gale as she left Exmouth on 5 January 1851, and he was one of three pilots who were putting out in their small dinghy. As they boarded the boat, Pincomb was washed into the sea. He was in the water for 45 minutes, before he was rescued; the pilots then saving the brig from disaster.

Further to a request to the Institution for a lifeboat for Exmouth by Lt. J. D. Agassiz, RN in 1858, a letter was received from Lady Rolle of Bicton House, Bicton, Devon, who offered the sum of £367 for the establishment of a lifeboat station. It was decided at the meeting of the RNLI committee of management on 7 October 1858, that her offer be accepted.

"The accumulation of shoals off the entrance to the river Ex must always be liable to occasional accidents both to shipping and boats; a life-boat is no doubt therefore a valuable acquisition to the port."

A boathouse was designed by C. H. Cooke, Honorary Architect to the Institution, and was constructed next to the coastguard station at the end of The Esplanade, by local builder Mr Burridge, at a cost of £184-19s-7d. The site was granted at a nominal lease of 5 shillings per annum by the landowner, the Hon. Mark Rolle, who also pledged to subscribe £10 annually to the Institution.

In 1859, a 30-foot-long (9.1 m) self-righting 'Pulling and Sailing' (P&S) lifeboat, one with sails and (six) oars, was sent to the town, transported by rail to the nearest railway station from London free of charge by the Great Western and Bristol and Exeter railway companies. In accordance with the wishes of Lady Rolle, the lifeboat was named Victoria. Lt. Agassiz, RN, was appointed Honorary Secretary.

The first call came on 14 March in 1866, but as the crew assembled, they were stood down, when the casualty vessel freed itself from trouble. However, the lifeboat was launched on 5 January 1867, into a south-easterly gale and against a flood tide, to the aid of the brigantine Julia. Despite the best efforts of the crew, the lifeboat, with just six oars, did not have enough manpower to reach the vessel before it broke up. Just one of the seven crew of the Julia survived. Two months later on 26 March 1867, the lifeboat capsized on exercise. The boat self-righted, and all the crew regained the boat, but the event affirmed that improvements were needed.

The lifeboat was replaced in April 1867. The larger 32 ft (9.8 m) lifeboat, now with 10 oars, was again funded by Lady Rolle, and again given the name Victoria.

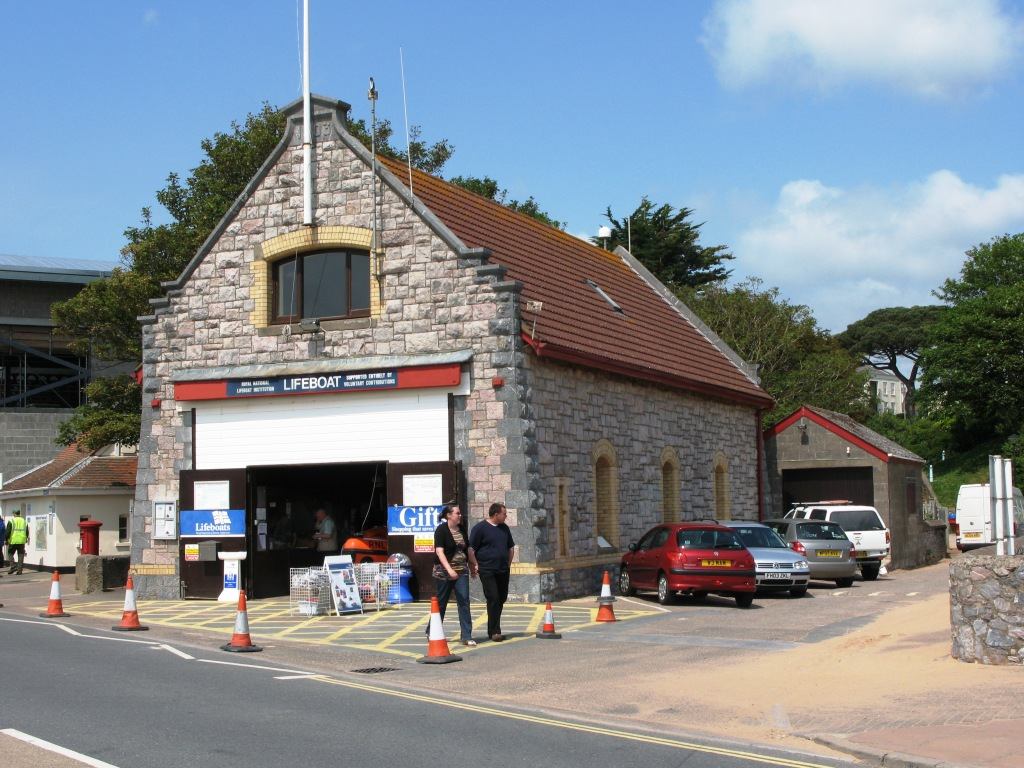
The 1903 lifeboat house

A new lifeboat arrived in 1903, the second boat to be provided by Mrs J. Somes of Annery House, Devon, in memory of her late husband Joseph Somes, former MP for Dartmouth (constituency). To house the 35 ft (11 m) boat, Joseph Somes (ON 519), the old boathouse was demolished, and a new boathouse was constructed on the same site, at a cost of £800.

On the 5 November 1916, the lifeboat was launched into a south-east gale, to the assistance of the ship St Paul. With the lack of regular crew due to the First World War, the lifeboat crew was made up of entirely elderly men. A special letter of thanks and an additional award was granted by the committee of management.

A motor-powered lifeboat was provided for Exmouth in 1933. The new 35 ft 6 in (10.82 m) boat was essentially a P&S lifeboat, retaining sails, and oars, but fitted with a single 35-hp Weyburn AE6 6-cylinder petrol engine, delivering 7 knots (13 km/h; 8.1 mph). The lifeboat was funded from the legacy of the Rev. Charles Pemberton Eaton. At a ceremony on 29 August 1933, witnessed by a crowd of over 8,000 people, the lifeboat was named Catherine Harriet Eaton (ON 767), after the mother of the late donor. A Clayton launch tractor (T12) was provided in 1948.

Exmouth received a brand new Liverpool-class lifeboat Maria Noble (ON 916) on 1 October 1953 but it was not named until 1 September 1954. Her first service call was on the evening 19 September 1954, to investigate flashing lights and shouts for help near the Maer Rocks. The lifeboat secretary and coxswain lit up the scene with a car's headlights and they saw the 20-foot (6.1 m) cabin cruiser Nicky, which was at anchor but appeared to be sinking. At first, the tide was too low to reach it with the lifeboat, but it was launched as soon as the water had risen sufficiently. Even then, the lifeboat touched the bottom in the troughs between waves. The lifeboat took on board all the people from the Nicky and returned to station just 26 minutes after being launched. Coxswain Harold 'Dido' Bradford was subsequently awarded the RNLI Bronze Medal for this rescue.

== 1960 onwards ==
The 45-foot 6in Watson-class lifeboat George and Sarah Strachan (ON 749) was placed on service in 1960. Now too large for the 1903 boathouse, the boat was moored in the river Exe. The crew operated from a building on the docks, with a boarding boat launched via a davit.

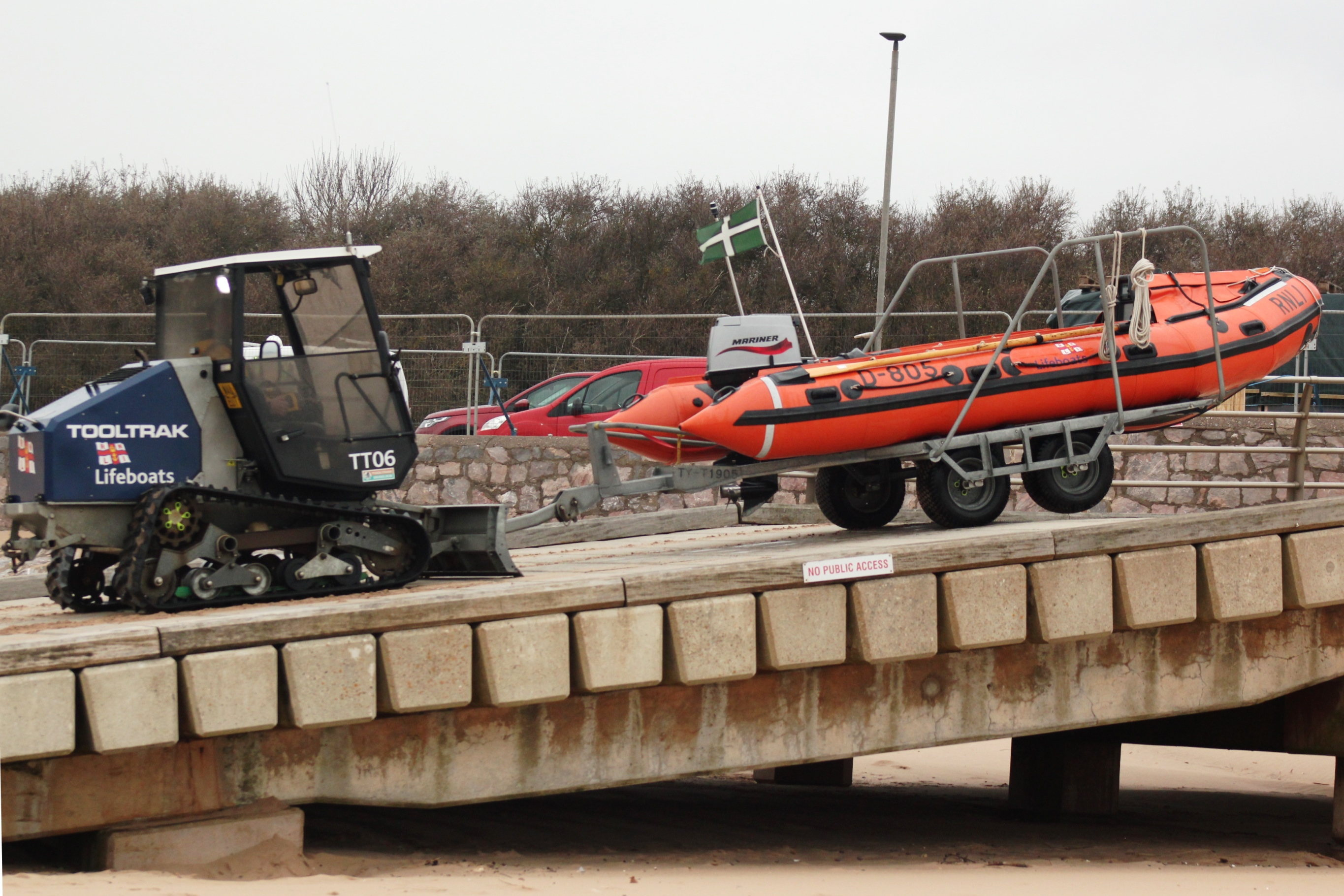
D-class (IB1) Inshore lifeboat George Bearman II (D-805) and Tooltrak launch vehicle TT06 in 2024

The boathouse was initially made into a fundraising centre, but in May 1966, it became home to a D-class (RFD PB16) Inshore lifeboat, (D-89). Since 1964, in response to an increasing amount of water-based leisure activity, the RNLI had been placing the small fast Inshore lifeboats around the country. These were easily launched with just a few people, ideal to respond quickly to local emergencies.

The building used by crews at the docks was demolished in 1996 and replaced by temporary portable buildings. In the same year, a new Trent-class All-weather lifeboat, 14-12 Forward Birmingham (ON 1210), was placed at Exmouth, funded once again by the people of Birmingham.

After the visit on 24 October 2001 by the Coast Review delegation, it was decided that every effort should be made to reduce the low-water launching limitations at Exmouth, that were being encountered by the lifeboat moored in the river. Testing in 2005 showed that a carriage-launched lifeboat, launched from the beach, would eliminate these issues. It was decided to construct a new station near Maer Rocks, from where both the ALB and ILB could operate at all states of the tide.

The new facility, built at the eastern end of the Exmouth esplanade, has a boat hall to accommodate a Shannon-class All-weather lifeboat and launch vehicle (SLARS), a second hall for the D-class Inshore lifeboat and tractor, up to date crew facilities, and a souvenir outlet. The project, estimated to cost £2.2 million, was declared operational on 21 November 2009.

The Trent-class lifeboat was exchanged for an interim carriage-launched Mersey-class lifeboat in 2008, 12-21 Margaret Jean (ON 1178). This boat was housed in the boathouse, pending the arrival of a new Shannon, 13-03 R and J Welburn (ON 1310), which was placed on service on 22 May 2014. The old 1903 boathouse was retained as a base for the RNLI lifeguards, until being handed back to Clinton Devon estates, and is now used by Exmouth Rowing Club.

Work started in November 2021, to extend the slipway by a further 10 m (33 ft), after a storm caused significant sand movement, leaving the end of the slipway in mid-air.

In 2024, the Exmouth lifeboat was designated as the seventh "Launch a Memory" lifeboat. Supporters could sponsor a name to be incorporated on the number of the boat. The lifeboat now carries 15,040 names, raising £1,089,404 for the RNLI.

=== Will Carder ===
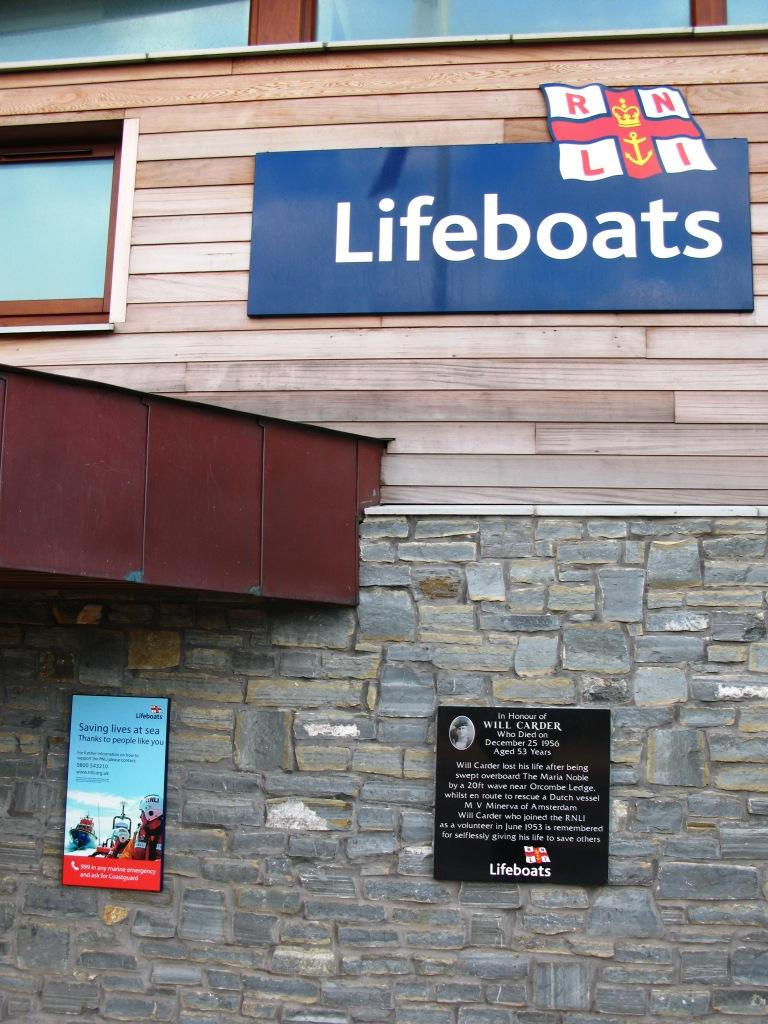
A memorial plaque for Will Carder on the 2009 station

William J. Carder was born in 1903 and volunteered for the Exmouth lifeboat crew in June 1953. He earned a living running The Volunteer public house. On Christmas Day 1956 he was on board when the Maria Noble was called out to the MV Minerva which was burning distress flares, 4 miles (6.4 km) south east of Orcombe Point.

The lifeboat launched at 17:20 into a Force 6 to 8 wind and 20-foot (6.1 m) waves. About 10 minutes, out a large wave pushed the boat far over onto her side and the radio aerial was also damaged. Will Carder was near the front of the boat with two colleagues at the time and told them that he was going aft to get some shelter. Another large wave then broke over the boat. Although no one saw it happen, this is believed to be when Will Carder was swept overboard. Brian Rowsell was trying to repair the aerial and was knocked into the mast and sustained a head injury. A few minutes later Second Coxswain Jack Phillips was also washed overboard.

Coxswain Harold 'Dido' Bradford took the tough decision to continue to the ship that was in distress. To turn the lifeboat around to search for the missing men would have been extremely difficult and dangerous in that storm. While the main radio was inoperable, a message was broadcast on the wavelength used by trawlers and this was picked up in Exmouth and relayed to the lifeboat station. A search was got underway along the beaches. Jack Phillips was found staggering in the surf. He was helped up the cliff and taken to hospital. The body of Will Carder was later found nearby.

The lifeboat reached the Minerva at 18:45. They found that the engines had failed and the anchor was barely holding. They stood by until 20:00, when the Torbay lifeboat George Shee (ON 734) arrived to take over. Sea conditions made it difficult to return to their station, so the Exmouth lifeboat sailed instead to Torquay, where Brian Rowsell was taken to hospital to have his injuries seen to. The crew stayed here to rest and then returned home at 14:00 on Boxing Day, the RNLI flag flying at half mast.

== Description ==
The lifeboat station is built at the eastern end of Queen's Drive at the top of the beach. The building contains two separate boathouses for the ILB and ALB and has a short concrete ramp that leads down to the beach. Each boat is kept on a carriage attached to a tractor which propels it down to the water and brings it back after use. A fund-raising shop is situated on the east side, while crew facilities are at first floor level.

== Area of operation ==
The Shannon-class at Exmouth has an operating range of 250 nautical miles (460 km) and a top speed of 25 knots (46 km/h). All-weather lifeboats are at Weymouth Lifeboat Station to the east, and Torbay to the southwest. Inshore area of operation includes the river Exe up to the city of Exeter. There are also Inshore lifeboats at Sidmouth (Ind.) and Lyme Regis to the east and Teignmouth to the south-west.

== Station honours ==
The following are awards made at Exmouth:

- RNIPLS Silver Medal
  Lt. John Sergeant, RN, Chief Officer of H.M. Coastguard – 1831
  Thomas Pincomb Jr., Pilot – 1851
- RNLI Silver Medal
  John Bradford – 1894
  Uriah Bradford – 1894
  George Prowse – 1894
- RNLI Bronze Medal
  Harold John Bradford, Coxswain – 1954
  Roger Charles Jackson, Helm – 2012
- Award from the The Shipwrecked Fishermen and Mariners' Royal Benevolent Society
  Roger Charles Jackson, Helm – 2012
- The Thanks of the Institution inscribed on Vellum
  Capt. J. D. Agassiz, RN, Honorary Secretary – 1866
  Thomas Horne, Coxswain – 1938
  Brian Rowsell, Coxswain – 1966
  Peter Rowsell, crew member – 1966
  Geoffrey Ingram, crew member – 1985
  Mark Champion, crew member – 2012
  Andrew Williams, crew member – 2012
- A Special Letter of Thanks from the Committee of Management
  Exmouth Lifeboat Crew – 1916
- A Framed Letter of Thanks signed by the Chairman of the Institution
  Brian Rowsell, Coxswain – 1981
  Giles White, Helm – 2010
- Letter of Appreciation signed by the Director of the Institution
  M. Clifton, a former crew member – 1981
- Queen Elizabeth II Silver Jubilee Medal
  Bernard Bradford, Motor Mechanic – 1977

== Roll of honour ==
In memory of those lost whilst serving at Exmouth:

- Died of a heart attack heading home after firing the signals for an exercise, 9 August 1905
  Frederick Benjamin Hayman Horn, Signalman (49)
- Collapsed and died whilst assisting the launch of the lifeboat on exercise, 14 March 1907
  Henry Christopher Squire, Coxswain (57)
- Fell from his bicycle en route to a launch on 6 July 1952. Taken to hospital after the call, he later suffered a stroke, and died the following year on 25 December 1953.
  Phillip Samuel Gifford, crew member (58)
- Washed overboard and lost on service to the motor vessel Minerva, 25 December 1956
  William J. Carder, crew member (53)

== Exmouth lifeboats ==
=== Pulling and sailing lifeboats ===
On station	ON (Note: ON is the RNLI's Official Number of the boat.)	Name	Built	Class	Comments
1803–c.1815	—	Lifeboat	1803	27-foot Greathead	(Note: 27 ft 0 in (8.23 m) x 10 ft 0 in (3.05 m) (10-oared) Greathead-class self-righting (P&S) lifeboat, gift of Lord Rolle and public subscription, with a £50 donation from Lloyd's of London, built by Henry Greathead of South Shields, costing £150.)
1859–1867	Pre-346	Victoria	1859	30-foot Peake Self-righting (P&S)	(Note: 30 ft 0 in (9.14 m) x 6 ft 3 in (1.91 m) (6-oared) Peake-class self-righting (P&S) lifeboat, gift of Lady Rolle of Bicton House, Bicton, Devon, built by Forrestt of Limehouse, London, costing £140.); Capsized 26 March 1867. Broken up in 1867.
1867–1884	Pre-493	Victoria	1867	32-foot Prowse Self-righting (P&S)	(Note: 32 ft 0 in (9.75 m) x 7 ft 7 in (2.31 m) (10-oared) Prowse-class self-righting (P&S) lifeboat, gift of Lady Rolle of Bicton House, Bicton, Devon, built by Forrestt of Limehouse, London, costing £254.); Capsized 1882. Returned to London in 1884.
1884–1903	41	Joseph Somes	1883	34-foot Self-righting (P&S)	(Note: 34 ft 0 in (10.36 m) x 7 ft 6 in (2.29 m) (10-oared) self-righting (P&S) lifeboat, gift of Mrs J. Somes of Annery House, Devon, built by Woolfe of Shadwell, London, costing £270.); Broken up in 1904.
1903–1933	519	Joseph Somes	1903	35-foot Self-righting (P&S)	(Note: 35 ft 0 in (10.67 m) x 8 ft 6 in (2.59 m) (10-oared) self-righting (P&S) lifeboat, gift of Mrs J. Somes of Annery House, Devon, built by Thames Ironworks of Blackwall, London, costing £683.); Sold in 1933. Renamed Blue Dragon, later Panatella. Last reported as a yacht at Marchwood Yacht Club, Southampton, July 1983.

Pre ON numbers are unofficial numbers used by the Lifeboat Enthusiasts' Society to reference early lifeboats not included on the official RNLI list.

=== Motor lifeboats ===
On station	ON	Op.No. (Note: Op. No. is the RNLI's Operational Number of the boat carried on the hull.)	Name	Built	Class	Comments
1933–1953	767	—	Catherine Harriet Eaton	1933	35-foot 6in Self-righting (motor)	Sold in 1953. Renamed Sharan. Used as the Skomer Island trip boat, wrecked in 1976.
1953–1960	916	—	Maria Noble	1953	Liverpool	Transferred to the relief fleet. Later at Blackpool.
1960–1963	749	—	George and Sarah Strachan	1931	45-foot 6in Watson	Previously at Dunbar. Sold in 1969 for use as a workboat. Last reported at Dunoon, November 2013.
1963–1968	838	—	Michael Stephens	1939	46-foot Watson (shallow draught)	Previously at Lowestoft, including WW2 service to Dunkirk. Sold in 1976. Last reported at River Yealm, Newton Ferrers, December 2023.
1968–1970	847	—	Gertrude	1946	46-foot Watson	Previously at Holy Island. Transferred to Sheerness.
1970–1983	1012	48-009	City of Birmingham	1970	Solent	The first of two Exmouth All-weather lifeboats to be funded by the people of Birmingham. Transferred to Walton and Frinton.
1983–1994	1088	33-06	Caroline Finch	1983	Brede	Sold in 1994 for further use a lifeboat South Star at Hermanus, South Africa. Sold in 2022, to be a workboat at False Bay.
1994–1996	1045	44-019	Louis Marchesi of the Round Table	1977	Waveney	Previously at Newhaven and Alderney. Sold in 1999 for further use as lifeboat P&O Nedlloyd Rescue at Waiheke, New Zealand. Since sold out of service, it was reported in use as a pleasure boat with original name at Northcote Point, Auckland, August 2025.
1996–2008	1210	14-12	Forward Birmingham	1995	Trent	Transferred to the relief fleet. Broken for spares in 2024
2008–2014	1178	12-21	Margaret Jean	1991	Mersey	Initially deployed in the Relief Fleet from 1992. Sold in 2020. Renamed Arwen Myrtle, at Saint Peter Port, November 2025.
2014–	1310	13-03	R and J Welburn	2014	Shannon	

More post-service details can be found on the respective lifeboat class pages.

=== Inshore lifeboats ===
On station	Op.No.	Name	Class	Comments
1966–1972	D-89	Unnamed	D-class (RFD PB16)	
1972–1977	D-214	Unnamed	D-class (Zodiac III)	
1977–1988	D-255	Unnamed	D-class (Zodiac III)	
1988–1997	D-364	Clubs of the River Exe	D-class (EA16)	
1997–2006	D-516	Spirit of the Exe	D-class (EA16)	On service from 27 May 1997.
2006-2017	D-669	George Bearman	D-class (IB1)	On service from Wednesday 27 September 2006
2017-	D-805	George Bearman II	D-class (IB1)	

=== Launch and recovery tractors ===
On station	Op.No.	Reg. No.	Type	Comments
1948–1950	T12	IJ 5658	Clayton	
1950–1951	T4	XA 9192	Clayton	
1951–1953	T12	IJ 5658	Clayton	
1953–1955	T41	JXR 66	Case LA	
1955–1962	T53	KXT 421	Case LA	
2009–2014	T108	F133 FUJ	Talus MB-H Crawler	
2011–	TT06	WA11 EUT	Tooltrak	
2014–	SC-T04	HF14 HFK	SLARS (Supacat)	

== See also ==
- List of RNLI stations
- List of former RNLI stations
- Royal National Lifeboat Institution lifeboats
