= 35ft 6in Self-righting motor-class lifeboat =

Former RNLI lifeboat class

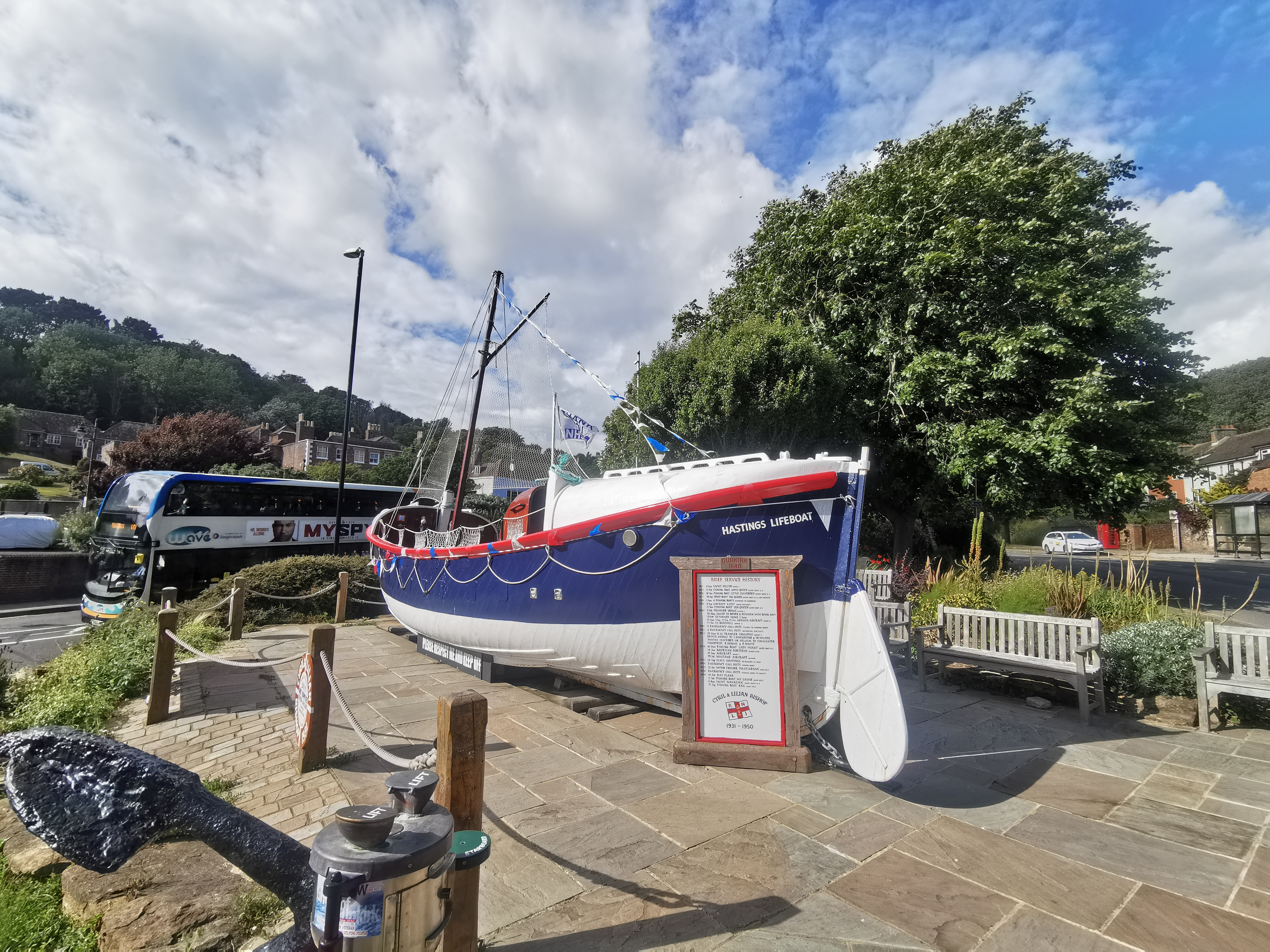
- Cyril and Lillian Bishop (ON740) on display at Hastings, 2020

Class overview
- Name: 35ft 6in Self-righting motor-class
- Builders: J. Samuel White, Cowes; S. E. Saunders, Cowes; Saunders-Roe, Cowes; J. I. Thorneycroft, Chiswick; Rowhedge Ironworks, Rowhedge; Groves & Guttridge, Cowes
- Succeeded by: Liverpool-class
- Cost: £3,000- £14,000
- Built: Single engine: 1921–1940; Twin engine: 1947–1950
- In service: Single engine: 1921–1963; Twin engine: 1947–1965
- Completed: Single engine: 25; Twin engine: 5
- Lost: 2
- Retired: 24
- Preserved: 3

General characteristics
- Displacement: Single engine: 5–6 long tons (5.1–6.1 t); Twin engine: 8–9 long tons (8.1–9.1 t)
- Length: 35 ft 6 in (10.82 m)
- Beam: 8 ft 10 in (2.69 m)-9 ft 10 in (3.00 m)
- Draught: 2 ft 8 in (0.81 m)
- Propulsion: Single engine: 35-bhp Weyburn AE6 6-cyl. petrol; Twin engine: 18-bhp Weyburn AE4 4-cyl. petrol/20-bhp Ferry FKR.3 3-cyl. diesel
- Speed: 8 knots (9.2 mph; 15 km/h)
- Crew: 7/8

The 35ft 6in Self-righting motor-class was a 10.8 m displacement hull lifeboat built in single engine form between 1921 and 1940 and in twin-engined form between 1947 and 1950. The boats were operated by the Royal National Lifeboat Institution (RNLI) between 1921 and 1965.

== History ==
The need to provide carriage-launched motor lifeboats had first been addressed with the 35 ft (10.7 m) self-righting motor type of 1921. Three of these boats were built and were, to all intents and purposes, pulling and sailing lifeboats, with an auxiliary engine.

The definitive boat for production appeared in 1929, six inches (15 cm) longer and with the same 8 ft 10 in (2.7 m) beam as the second and third 35-foot types. After the first two boats had been put on station, a crash programme of production was instituted in 1931 and twelve boats were produced that year. These gave many stations their first motor lifeboats, but experience proved that stability was lacking and from RNLB Caroline Parsons (ON 763), beam was increased by 5 inches (13 cm). The final two single engine boats saw further beam increases, to 9 ft 6 in (2.9 m) and 9 ft 10 in (3.0 m) respectively.

In common with the similar but non-self-righting Liverpool-class, post war production switched to twin-engined versions, but only five were built. The RNLI was increasingly switching to more stable non-self-righting lifeboats, and the single engine 35-foot 6in self-righting motor lifeboats were replaced at most stations by Liverpool-class boats in the early 1950s, after around twenty years service. The twin-engined boats had even shorter lives, three being replaced by a Liverpool-class, and two others by 37 ft (11.3 m) Oakley-class boats, after less than fifteen-years service.

== Description ==
The challenge of producing a motor lifeboat light enough to be manhandled for carriage launching resulted in a boat weighing around 5 1/2 long tons (5.6 t). The single RNLI-designed, Weyburn Engineering built AE6 6-cylinder petrol engine produced 35-bhp, and sat in a watertight engine room beneath pent roof access hatches ahead of an aft cockpit shelter, from where the mechanic operated the engine controls. Apart from a small shelter forward, the boats were open. As described above, beam was increased during production in an attempt to improve stability.

After World War II, five twin-engined boats were built which had a beam of 10 ft (3.0 m) and a larger shelter covering the engine room and very similar to the contemporary twin engined Liverpool-class. The first two of these boats were powered by twin 18bhp Weyburn AE4 4-cylinder petrol engines, but the final three had twin 20bhp Ferry FKR3 3-cylinder diesel engines.

== Fleet ==
=== Single engine ===
35 ft (11 m) lifeboats

ON (Note: ON is the RNLI's Official Number of the boat.)	Name	Built	In Service	Stations	Comments
655	Priscilla Macbean	1921	1921–1927	Eastbourne	(Note: 35 ft (11 m) x 8 ft 6 in (2.59 m) lifeboat, legacy of Mr Macbean, built by J. Samuel White of Cowes, with single 15-hp Miller engine, costing £6,623.) Sold 1934. Renamed Laurita. Now as Priscilla Macbean at Hastings Shipwreck Museum, December 2025.
655	Priscilla Macbean	1921	1928–1931	Kirkcudbright	Sold 1934. Renamed Laurita. Now as Priscilla Macbean at Hastings Shipwreck Museum, December 2025.
655	Priscilla Macbean	1921	1931–1934	Maryport	Sold 1934. Renamed Laurita. Now as Priscilla Macbean at Hastings Shipwreck Museum, December 2025.
683	Herbert Joy	1923	1924–1931	Scarborough	(Note: 35 ft (11 m) x 8 ft 9 in (2.67 m) lifeboat, gift of Mr Joy, built by S. E. Saunders of Cowes, with single 35-hp Sage engine, costing £3,691.) Sold 1937. Renamed Swallow. Broken up at Camber Dock, Portsmouth, November 1995.
683	Herbert Joy	1923	1931–1937	Relief fleet	Sold 1937. Renamed Swallow. Broken up at Camber Dock, Portsmouth, November 1995.
703	L. P. and St. Helen	1927	1927–1929	Eastbourne	(Note: 35 ft (11 m) x 8 ft 10 in (2.69 m) lifeboat costing £4,961, built by S. E. Saunders of Cowes, with single 30-hp Halford engine. Weyburn AE6 engine fitted, 1930.) Sold 1949. Last reported at Morecambe, November 1949.
703	L. P. and St. Helen	1927	1929–1931	Relief fleet	Sold 1949. Last reported at Morecambe, November 1949.
703	L. P. and St. Helen	1927	1931–1937	Boulmer	Sold 1949. Last reported at Morecambe, November 1949.
703	L. P. and St. Helen	1927	1937–1949	Newcastle	Sold 1949. Last reported at Morecambe, November 1949.

=== Single engine ===
35 ft 6 in (10.82 m) lifeboats, with single 35-hp Weyburn AE6 6-cylinder petrol engine

ON	Name	Built	In Service	Stations	Comments
726	City of Nottingham	1929	1930–1936	Hythe	(Note: 35 ft 6 in (10.82 m) x 8 ft 10 in (2.69 m) lifeboat, gift of the City of Nottingham LB fund, built by Saunders-Roe of Cowes, costing £4,596.) Sold 1950. Renamed Margaret Rose and Dauntless. Restored to original as City of Nottingham, at Lawrenny Quay, Daugleddau estuary, January 2025.
726	City of Nottingham	1929	1936–1949	Clovelly	Sold 1950. Renamed Margaret Rose and Dauntless. Restored to original as City of Nottingham, at Lawrenny Quay, Daugleddau estuary, January 2025.
727	Westmorland	1930	1930–1940	Berwick-upon-Tweed	(Note: 35 ft 6 in (10.82 m) x 8 ft 10 in (2.69 m) lifeboat, gift of the Westmoreland LB fund, built by Saunders-Roe of Cowes, costing £4,597.) Sold June 1951. Renamed Swallow, owned by Northern Shipbreakers, Peterhead, 1961.
727	Westmorland	1930	1940–1951	Cullercoats	Sold June 1951. Renamed Swallow, owned by Northern Shipbreakers, Peterhead, 1961.
737	Louisa Polden	1931	1931–1951	Redcar	(Note: 35 ft 6 in (10.82 m) x 8 ft 10 in (2.69 m) lifeboat, gift of Mr Polden and family, built by Saunders-Roe of Cowes, costing £3,758.) Sold 1951. Broken up at Stockton-on-Tees in the 1980s.
738	J. H. W.	1931	1931–1939	Lytham St Annes	(Note: 35 ft 6 in (10.82 m) x 8 ft 10 in (2.69 m) lifeboat, legacies of Mrs May, Mr Haworth, Mrs Sackville and Mr Johnson, built by J. Samuel White of Cowes, costing £3,821.) Sold April 1948. Renamed Follie and later Navette, last seen, Thames area, 1990s.
738	J. H. W.	1931	1939–1947	Padstow No.2	Sold April 1948. Renamed Follie and later Navette, last seen, Thames area, 1990s.
739	Lily Glen – Glasgow	1931	1931–1952	Girvan	(Note: 35 ft 6 in (10.82 m) x 8 ft 10 in (2.69 m) lifeboat, gift of Mrs L. Glen, built by Saunders-Roe of Cowes, costing £3,743.) Sold May 1952. Renamed Ivy Dale, later Seeker II. Last reported derelict in a field off Harbour Road, Rye, June 2014.
740	Cyril and Lilian Bishop	1931	1931–1950	Hastings	(Note: 35 ft 6 in (10.82 m) x 8 ft 10 in (2.69 m) lifeboat, gift of Mrs L. Philpott, built by J. Samuel White of Cowes, costing £3,821.) Sold November 1950. Renamed Thekla, later Lindy Lou (CN-182). Restored as Cyril and Lilian Bishop, on permanent display at the Shipwreck Museum, Hastings, December 2025.
741	Morison Watson	1931	1931–1953	Kirkcudbright	(Note: 35 ft 6 in (10.82 m) x 8 ft 10 in (2.69 m) lifeboat, legacy of Mrs Watson, built by Saunders-Roe of Cowes, costing £3,718.) Sold 1953. Renamed Scauronian. Broken up at Terregles, Dumfries, August 1998.
742	Herbert Joy II	1931	1931–1951	Scarborough	(Note: 35 ft 6 in (10.82 m) x 8 ft 10 in (2.69 m) lifeboat, gift of Mr A. O. Joy, built by J. Samuel White of Cowes, costing £3,791.) Sold 1951. Renamed Viking Raumur. Broken up at Acaster Boatyard, York in the 1980s.
743	John and Sarah Eliza Stych	1931	1931–1938	Padstow No.1	(Note: 35 ft 6 in (10.82 m) x 8 ft 10 in (2.69 m) lifeboat, legacies of Mr and Mrs Stych, built by Saunders-Roe of Cowes, costing £3,754.); Capsized and wrecked on service, seven crew lost, 23 Jan 1939.
743	John and Sarah Eliza Stych	1931	1938–1939	St Ives	Capsized and wrecked on service, seven crew lost, 23 Jan 1939.
744	Laurana Sarah Blunt	1931	1931–1952	Youghal	(Note: 35 ft 6 in (10.82 m) x 8 ft 10 in (2.69 m) lifeboat, legacy of Dr G. V. Blunt, built by J. Samuel White of Cowes, costing £3,812.) Sold 1952. Renamed Laurana (UL3). Broken up west of Ullapool, 2005.
745	Lady Harrison	1931	1931–1948	Ramsey	(Note: 35 ft 6 in (10.82 m) x 8 ft 10 in (2.69 m) lifeboat, gift of Sir Heath Harrison, Bt, built by Saunders-Roe of Cowes, costing £3,754.) Sold 1952. Renamed Neula, Isle of Skomer and Merch-y-Mor. Destroyed by fire at Husbands Shipyard, Marchwood, Southampton, April 2005.
745	Lady Harrison	1931	1949–1951	Aberystwyth	Sold 1952. Renamed Neula, Isle of Skomer and Merch-y-Mor. Destroyed by fire at Husbands Shipyard, Marchwood, Southampton, April 2005.
746	William Maynard	1931	1931–1939	Cloughey	(Note: 35 ft 6 in (10.82 m) x 8 ft 10 in (2.69 m) lifeboat, legacy of Rev W. S. F. Maynard, built by J. Samuel White of Cowes, costing £3,804.) Sold February 1953. Renamed Endura. Lost in English Channel off Dungeness, December 1970.
746	William Maynard	1931	1939–1941	Relief fleet	Sold February 1953. Renamed Endura. Lost in English Channel off Dungeness, December 1970.
746	William Maynard	1931	1941–1948	Ferryside	Sold February 1953. Renamed Endura. Lost in English Channel off Dungeness, December 1970.
746	William Maynard	1931	1948–1949	Whitehills	Sold February 1953. Renamed Endura. Lost in English Channel off Dungeness, December 1970.
746	William Maynard	1931	1949–1953	Relief fleet	Sold February 1953. Renamed Endura. Lost in English Channel off Dungeness, December 1970.
747	Stanhope Smart	1931	1931–1947	Bridlington	(Note: 35 ft 6 in (10.82 m) x 8 ft 10 in (2.69 m) lifeboat, legacy of Mr S. Smart, built by Saunders-Roe of Cowes, costing £3,742.) Sold 1951. Last reported in Liberia, 1951.
747	Stanhope Smart	1931	1947–1951	Padstow No.2	Sold 1951. Last reported in Liberia, 1951.
748	Mary Ann Blunt	1931	1931–1950	Clogherhead	(Note: 35 ft 6 in (10.82 m) x 8 ft 10 in (2.69 m) lifeboat, legacy of Dr G. V. Blunt, built by J. Samuel White of Cowes, costing £3,791.) Sold 1951. Last reported with Balbriggan Sea Scouts, 1951.
752	John and William Mudie	1932	1932–1950	Arbroath	(Note: 35 ft 6 in (10.82 m) x 8 ft 10 in (2.69 m) lifeboat, legacies of Miss I. Mudie and Miss E. Mudie, built by John I. Thornycroft & Company of Chiswick, costing £3,233.) Sold June 1951. Renamed Hunting Call, later Sharon. Ashore at Kingholm Quay, Dumfries, August 2025.
756	Civil Service No.4	1932	1932–1948	Whitehills	(Note: 35 ft 6 in (10.82 m) x 8 ft 10 in (2.69 m) lifeboat, gift of the Civil Service LB fund, built by J. Samuel White of Cowes, costing £3,342.); Damaged beyond economic repair on service, 16 June 1948. Sold 1948. Renamed M. G. M., later Sandy K. Last reported as a yacht in Newfoundland in 1970.
757	Frederick Angus	1932	1932–1949	Aberystwyth	(Note: 35 ft 6 in (10.82 m) x 8 ft 10 in (2.69 m) lifeboat, legacy of Mr F. Angus, built by J. Samuel White of Cowes, costing £3,326.) Sold August 1949. Renamed Yr Ystwyth. Last reported as a damaged yacht, at Oakford, Nr Aberaeron, August 2015.
763	Caroline Parsons	1933	1933–1938	St Ives	(Note: 35 ft 6 in (10.82 m) x 9 ft 3 in (2.82 m) lifeboat, legacies of Miss Parsons and Mrs Noy, built by J. Samuel White of Cowes, costing £3,213.); Capsized and wrecked on service, 31 January 1938
767	Catherine Harriet Eaton	1933	1933–1953	Exmouth	(Note: 35 ft 6 in (10.82 m) x 9 ft 3 in (2.82 m) lifeboat, legacy of Rev C. P. Eaton, built by J. Samuel White of Cowes, costing £3,009.) Sold 1953. Renamed Sharan. Wrecked in Martins Haven Bay, Pembrokeshire, 1976.
768	Thomas and Annie Wade Richards	1933	1933–1953	Llandudno	(Note: 35 ft 6 in (10.82 m) x 9 ft 3 in (2.82 m) lifeboat, legacies of Dr T. Richards and Miss S. Lewis, built by J. Samuel White of Cowes, costing £3,010.) Sold 1953. Renamed Craiglais, Will Ifan and Dolphin (AB6). Believed to have been broken up at Tranmere, 2003/04.
785	Sir Heath Harrison	1936	1936–1949	Port St Mary	(Note: 35 ft 6 in (10.82 m) x 9 ft 6 in (2.90 m) lifeboat, gift of Lady Mary Harrison, built by J. Samuel White of Cowes, costing £3,279.) Sold January 1956. Renamed King John III. Last reported as Pilot Boat, Western Dock, Dover, December 1979.
785	Sir Heath Harrison	1936	1949–1955	Relief fleet	Sold January 1956. Renamed King John III. Last reported as Pilot Boat, Western Dock, Dover, December 1979.
826	Guide of Dunkirk	1940	1941–1963	Lizard-Cadgwith	(Note: 35 ft 6 in (10.82 m) x 9 ft 10 in (3.00 m) lifeboat, gift of the 'Girl Guides of the Empire', built by Rowhedge Ironworks of Rowhedge, Essex, costing £5,523.) Sold 1963. Renamed Girl Guide, later Ex-RNLB Guide of Dunkirk at Mevagissey Harbour. Sold 2025, now fully restored by Abbey Boat Builders at Reedham, Norfolk, September 2026.

=== Twin engine ===
All twin engined lifeboats were 35 ft 6 in (10.82 m) long by 10 ft (3.0 m) beam

ON	Name	Built	In service	Stations	Comments
851	Tillie Morrison, Sheffield	1947	1947–1953	Bridlington	(Note: Gift of Messrs. J & D Morrison, built by J. Samuel White of Cowes, with twin 18-hp Weyburn AE4 engines, costing £10,573.); Capsized on service at Bridlington on 19 August 1952, one crew member lost. Sold November 1959. Renamed Imshi and Elizabeth. Restored for display as Tillie Morrison, Sheffield, now in storage at (closed) Bodafon Farm Park, Llandudno, April 2024.
851	Tillie Morrison, Sheffield	1947	1953–1959	Llandudno	Capsized on service at Bridlington on 19 August 1952, one crew member lost. Sold November 1959. Renamed Imshi and Elizabeth. Restored for display as Tillie Morrison, Sheffield, now in storage at (closed) Bodafon Farm Park, Llandudno, April 2024.
878	M. T. C. (Mechanised Transport Corps)	1950	1950–1963	Hastings	(Note: Gift of the Trained Women Driver's Assoc., in commemoration of the Mechanised Transport Corp, built by Groves & Guttridge of Cowes, with twin 18-hp Weyburn AE4 engines, costing £11,283.) Sold 1964. Renamed Good Fortune, later John Stuart (BH 211). Derelict in a field at Pinfold Lane, Bridlington, November 2016.
879	E. C. J. R.	1950	1951–1956	Scarborough	(Note: Legacies of Mr Wildish, Mr Mundy, Mr Chrichton and Mrs Wood, built by Groves & Guttridge of Cowes, with twin 20-hp FKR3 diesel engines, costing £12,095.); Capsized on service with three crew lost, 8 December 1954. Sold March 1963. Renamed Tyne Trident, later Can-Y-Don (AB 115). Semi-derelict at Loch Harport, Isle of Skye, November 2024.
879	E. C. J. R.	1950	1956–1963	Relief fleet	Capsized on service with three crew lost, 8 December 1954. Sold March 1963. Renamed Tyne Trident, later Can-Y-Don (AB 115). Semi-derelict at Loch Harport, Isle of Skye, November 2024.
880	Isaac and Mary Bolton	1950	1951–1963	Cullercoats	(Note: Legacy of Miss Bolton and a gift from the Northumberland War Distress Relief Fund, built by Groves & Guttridge of Cowes, with twin 20-hp FKR3 diesel engines, costing £12,548.) Sold 1964. Renamed R. A. J.. Last reported as Isaac and Mary Bolton at Loosdrecht, Netherlands, August 2025.
881	City of Leeds	1950	1951–1965	Redcar	(Note: Gift of the City of Leeds LB fund, built by Groves & Guttridge of Cowes, with twin 20-hp FKR3 diesel engines, costing £13,939.) Sold March 1965. Renamed Sea Llex (LO 283). Last reported at Walney Channel, Barrow-in-Furness, October 1996.
