= Llandudno Lifeboat Station =

Lifeboat station in Conwy County Borough, Wales

- Gorsaf Bad Achub Llandudno

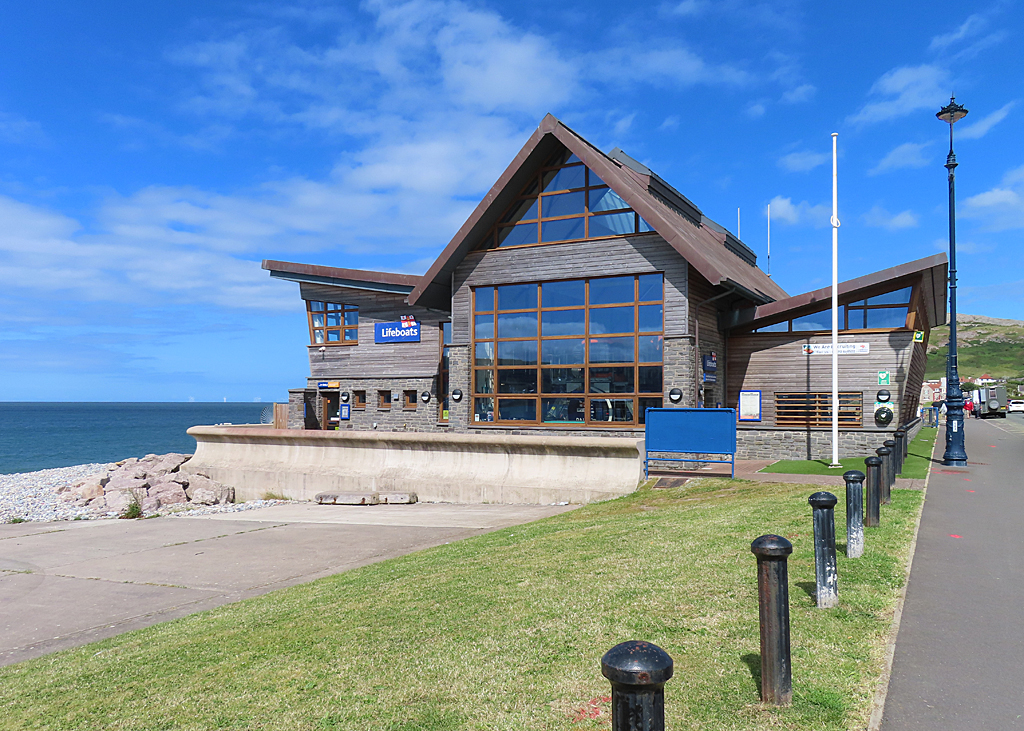
- Llandudno Lifeboat Station on the promenade at Craig-y-Don in 2024

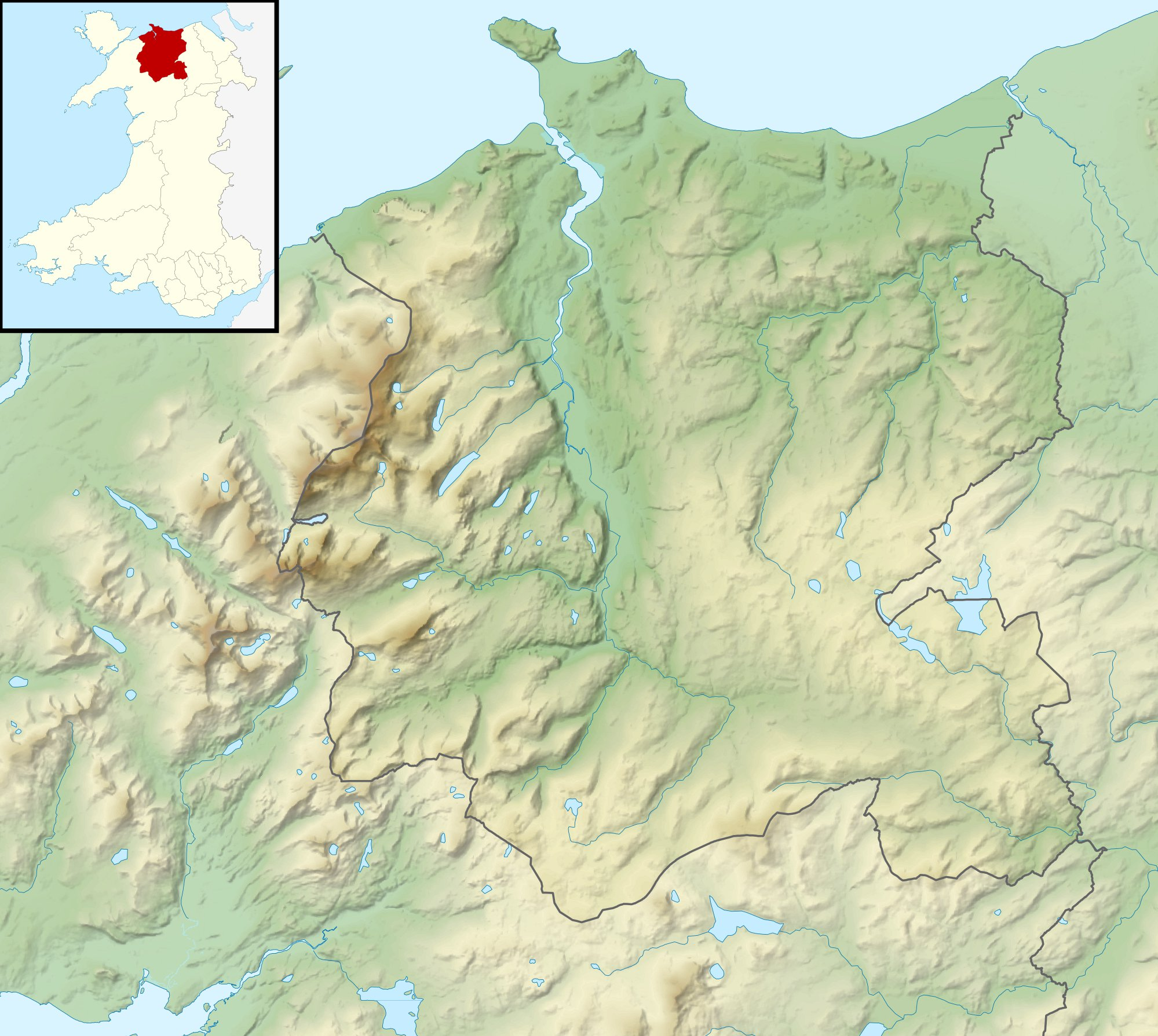
- Location within Conwy
- Former names: Ormes Head Lifeboat Station

General information
- Type: RNLI Lifeboat Station
- Location: Craig-y-Don, Colwyn Road, Llandudno, Conwy, LL30 3AA, Wales
- Coordinates: 53°19′19″N 3°50′2″W
- Opened: 1861
- Owner: Royal National Lifeboat Institution

Website
- Llandudno RNLI Lifeboat Station

Llandudno Lifeboat Station (Welsh: Gorsaf Bad Achub Llandudno) is located in the town and seaside resort of Llandudno, sitting on the Creuddyn peninsula, in Conwy County Borough, North Wales.

A lifeboat was first stationed at Llandudno by the Royal National Lifeboat Institution (RNLI) in 1861. The station was initially named Ormes Head Lifeboat Station.

The station currently operates a Shannon-class lifeboat, 13-18 William F. Yates (ON 1325), on station since 24 September 2017, and a D-class (IB1) Inshore lifeboat, Dr Barbara Saunderson (D-793), on station since 2016.

== History ==
The 'Ormes Head' lifeboat was designed to look after the busy shipping area close to the Great Orme, used by the many ships to ferry goods to the enormous Mersyside docks and other North Western destinations. The Great Orme with its shallow waters, strong tides, rocky coastline and often strong winds, claimed many ships and lives. Because of the weather and tidal conditions, plus the depths of water, vicious waves can quickly build up around the Orme and Liverpool Bay.

At a meeting of the RNLI committee of management on Thursday 1 December 1859, letters were read from Rev. M. Morgan, of Conway, and Mr. John Jones of Llandudno, which highlighted the necessity of a lifeboat at Llandudno. At a further meeting of the committee on 2 August 1860, and following a visit to the area and report by the Inspector of Lifeboats, it was decided to establish a lifeboat station at Llandudno.

A third meeting of the committee on 4 October 1860, noted letters from the Misses Browne, of Toxteth Park, Liverpool, and their donation of £200, which they wished to be used for the purchase of a life-boat to be stationed at Llandudno, and to be called The Sisters' Memorial, in memory of a deceased sister.

A new lifeboat house was constructed on Augusta Street, adjacent to the entrance of Llandudno Railway Station, at a cost of £147-10s. It was thought that it would be easy to transport the lifeboat by rail to other parts of the coast if required, but the circumstances never arose.

A 32 ft (9.8 m) self-righting 'Pulling and Sailing (P&S) lifeboat, one with sails and (10) oars, built by Forrestt of Limehouse, London, and costing £190, arrived in Llandudno on 14 January 1861. It was transported with its carriage and equipment free of charge, by the London and North Western Railway. The following day, the lifeboat was duly named Sisters Memorial, and launched on demonstration.

The name of the station was formally changed to Llandudno Lifeboat Station in 1893.

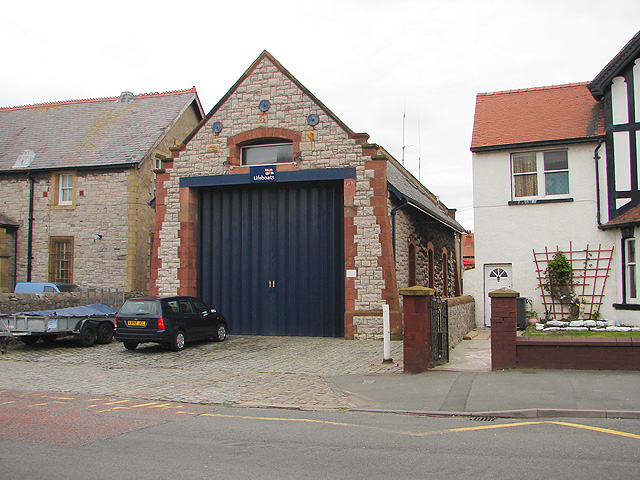
1903 Llandudno Lifeboat Station

In 1903, a new boathouse was constructed on Lloyd Street, at a cost of £1,300. Llandudno sits on the isthmus between the mainland and the Great Orme, with a shore on either side of the town. The site of the Llandudno Lifeboat Station on Lloyd Street was almost equidistant from both of Llandudno's shores, from where the lifeboat could be towed equally quickly in either direction.

Whilst allowing a launch in either direction, the downside was that the station was approximately 700 metres (0.43 mi) from either launching point, with its consequential launch travelling the streets of Llandudno taking on average 12–15 minutes, depending on traffic conditions.

On 27 March 1919, the Llandudno lifeboat Theodore Price (ON 486) was launched into a north-westerly gale, to the aid of the schooner Ada Mary of Liverpool. In danger of being driven ashore after losing her sails, and one anchor cable, the lifeboat managed to rescue her crew of two in difficult conditions. After a further two hours, battling to return to Llandudno, the lifeboat made for Colwyn Bay. Coxswain John Owen was awarded the RNLI Bronze Medal.

== 1960s onwards ==
In 1964, in response to an increasing amount of water-based leisure activity, the RNLI placed 25 small fast Inshore lifeboats around the country. These were easily launched with just a few people, ideal to respond quickly to local emergencies.

More Inshore lifeboats were deployed, and in 1965, the D-class (RFD PB16) Inshore lifeboat (D-54) was placed at the Llandudno station, the first in North Wales. The Llandudno Inshore lifeboat serves the immediate coastline of the Great Orme, Little Orme, Rhos-on-Sea, Colwyn Bay and Llandudno West Shore. On the West Shore there are dangerous sands, widely used by families visiting the seaside, that can quickly become flooded, trapping people on the sand bars as the tide floods. Sadly these sands have caused tragedy in recent years and it is for this reason that the Llandudno Inshore Lifeboat, along with Conwy Inshore lifeboat, are on 24-hour call for an immediate launch.

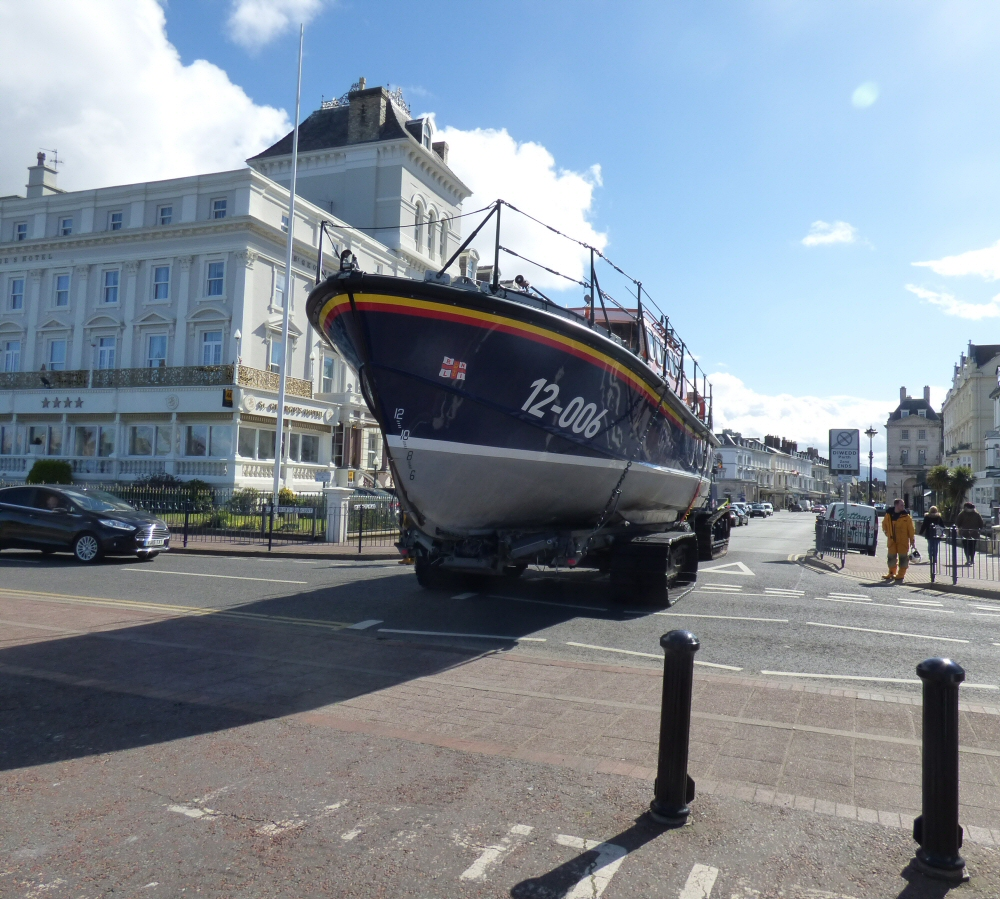
Mersey-class lifeboat 12-006 Andy Pearce (ON 1164), the last lifeboat to be towed through the streets of Llandudno

More recently, Llandudno lifeboat has undertaken some famous and unusual rescues. The Inshore boat was launched in 2005 to the aid of a Humpback whale that had become entangled in ropes and a buoy, off Rhos-on-Sea. The whale was successfully cut free.

In 2008, a mammoth 18-hour rescue in gale force winds saw the All-weather lifeboat, 12-006 Andy Pearce (ON 1164), under the command of Coxswain Graham Heritage, going 34 miles (55 km) offshore, to rescue a couple in distress, whose boat had become anchored to the sea bed by fishing nets. Crew member Tim James was put aboard and spent an hour and a half, frequently submerged by waves, freeing the boat from the nets. As a result of their service that year, the crew were awarded the North Wales 'Your Champions' 2008 team award and Tim James received the top award 'Champion of Champions'.

In 2011, Dan Jones, a former Llandudno Lifeboat RNLI coxswain, was awarded the MBE, for service to the RNLI.

== New lifeboat station ==
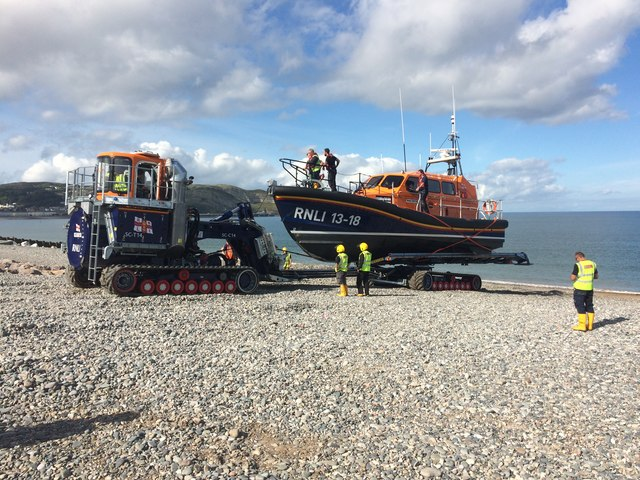
Shannon-class All-weather lifeboat 13-18 William F. Yates (ON 1325) and SLARS launch vehicle

A number of attempts had been made to relocate the lifeboat station without success, due to planning complaints. Local hoteliers did not want a lifeboat station interrupting the view in front of their hotels, but local residents around the existing lifeboat station complained of the ground shaking, every time a launch was undertaken.

However, with the intended assignment of a new Shannon-class All-weather lifeboat, which was too large for the existing boathouse, and the tireless campaign for many years by the late John Raymond (Ray) Evans, Deputy Launch Authority, planning permission was finally granted for the construction of a new boathouse at Craig-y-Don in 2014. Building work began in the spring of 2016 and was completed in the summer of 2017.

The new Shannon-class All-weather lifeboat arrived at the new station on 24 September 2017, with the lifeboat and new boathouse formally declared operational on Tuesday 10 October 2017.

At a ceremony just eleven days later, on 21 October 2017, the boathouse was officially declared open by former RNLI Director of Operations Michael Vlasto OBE and Jenny Evans, wife of the late Ray Evans. A new D-class (IB1) Inshore lifeboat, which had arrived in 2016, was formally presented to the Institution by Brian Saunderson, brother of the donor, and named in honour of the late Dr Barbara Saunderson, a life-long supporter of the RNLI. The £2.2M All-weather lifeboat was named 13-18 William F. Yates (ON 1325), primarily funded from the estate of Gladys Yates, of Widnes, and named in memory of her late husband, William Frederick Marple Yates. Both lifeboats were accepted by RNLI Operations Director George Rawlinson, and then handed into the care of Capt. Marcus Elliot, Llandudno Lifeboat Operations Manager.

== Station honours ==
The following are awards made at Llandudno:

- RNLI Bronze Medal
  John Owen, Coxswain – 1919
- 'The Thanks of the Institution inscribed on Vellum'
  Robert Jones, Helm – 1974
- A Special Framed Certificate
  Llandudno Lifeboat Station – 1990 (Towyn and Pensarn Flooding)
- 'A Framed Letter of Thanks signed by the Chairman of the Institution'
  Craig Roberts, duty officer at Conwy Marina – 1997
- North Wales 'Champion of Champions' award 2008
  Tim James, crew member – 2008
- North Wales 'Your Champions' award 2008
  Llandudno lifeboat crew – 2008
- Member, Order of the British Empire (MBE)
  Meurig Glynn Davies, Coxswain – 1993QBH
  Ian (Dan) Jones, Head Launcher and former Coxswain – 2011NYH

== Roll of honour ==
In memory of those lost whilst serving Llandudno lifeboat.

- Taken ill after the inaugural launch of lifeboat Sunlight No. 1 (ON 124) on 3 December 1887, and died two weeks later.
  Edward Jones, Second Coxswain (47)
- Died after being run over by the lifeboat carriage during launch, 7 November 1890.
  Robert Williams
- Died after being run over by the lifeboat carriage during launch, 8 August 1892.
  Arthur Whalley (32)
- Died from exposure following service of the Theodore Price (ON 486) to the ketch Lily Garton, 22 February 1908.
  John Williams, crew member

== Llandudno lifeboats ==
=== Pulling and Sailing (P&S) lifeboats ===
| ON (Note: ON is the RNLI's Official Number of the boat.) | Name | Built | On station | Class | Comments |
|---|---|---|---|---|---|
| Pre-377 | Sisters Memorial | 1860 | 1861–1867 | 32-foot Peake self-righting (P&S) | (Note: 32 ft 0 in (9.75 m) x 7 ft 10 in (2.39 m) (10-oared) Peake-class self-righting (P&S) lifeboat, gift of the Misses Brown of Liverpool, built by Forrestt of Limehouse, London, costing £190.); Capsized 7 February 1867. Sold in 1867, deemed too small. |
| Pre-486 | Sisters Memorial | 1867 | 1867–1887 | 33-foot Peake self-righting (P&S) | (Note: 33 ft 0 in (10.06 m) x 8 ft 7 in (2.62 m) (10-oared) Peake-class self-righting (P&S) lifeboat, gift of the Misses Brown of Liverpool, built by Forrestt of Limehouse, London, costing £246.); Capsized 10 August 1885. Sold in 1887. |
| 124 | Sunlight No. 1 | 1887 | 1887–1902 | 37-foot self-righting (P&S) | (Note: 37 ft 0 in (11.28 m) x 8 ft 0 in (2.44 m) (12-oared) self-righting (P&S) lifeboat, gift of Lever Brothers of Warrington, built by Forrestt of Limehouse, London, costing £529.); Sold in 1902. |
| 486 | Theodore Price | 1902 | 1902–1930 | 37-foot self-righting (P&S) | (Note: 37 ft 0 in (11.28 m) x 9 ft 3 in (2.82 m) (10-oared) self-righting (P&S) lifeboat, legacy of Miss A. G. G. Rolleston of Hyde Park, London, built by Thames Ironworks of Blackwall, London, costing £908.); Sold in 1930. Renamed Marelli. Reverted to Theodore Price, but broken up at St Georges Quay, Lancaster in December 2000. |
| 465 | Sarah Jane Turner | 1901 | 1930–1931 | 37-foot self-righting (P&S) | (Note: 37 ft 0 in (11.28 m) x 9 ft 3 in (2.82 m) (10-oared) self-righting (P&S) lifeboat, gift of the late Sir Samuel Turner of Rochdale, built by Thames Ironworks of Blackwall, London, costing £911.); Previously at Montrose. Sold in 1931. Renamed Marali, later Puffin. Broken up at West Mersea in July 2012. |
| 512 | Reserve No. 4C | 1903 | 1931–1933 | 37-foot self-righting (P&S) | (Note: 37 ft 0 in (11.28 m) x 9 ft 3 in (2.82 m) (10-oared) self-righting (P&S) lifeboat, gift of the Misses Simpson of Lancaster, built by Thames Ironworks of Blackwall, London, costing £928 when new.); Previously Matthew Simpson at Berwick-upon-Tweed, later at Ramsey. Sold in 1933. |

Pre ON numbers are unofficial numbers used by the Lifeboat Enthusiasts' Society to reference early lifeboats not included on the official RNLI list.

=== Motor lifeboats ===
| ON | Op.No. (Note: Op. No. is the RNLI's Operational Number of the boat carried on the hull.) | Name | Built | On station | Class | Comments |
|---|---|---|---|---|---|---|
| 768 | – | Thomas & Annie Wade Richards | 1933 | 1933–1953 | 35-foot 6in self-righting (motor) | |
| 851 | – | Tillie Morrison, Sheffield | 1947 | 1953–1959 | 35-foot 6in self-righting (motor) | Previously at Bridlington |
| 792 | – | Annie Ronald & Isabella Forrest | 1936 | 1959–1964 | Liverpool | Previously at St Abbs, Bridlington and Scarborough. |
| 976 | 37-09 | The Lilly Wainwright | 1964 | 1964–1990 | Oakley | Transferred to Kilmore Quay. |
| 1164 | 12-006 | Andy Pearce | 1990 | 1990–2017 | Mersey | |
| 1325 | 13-18 | William F. Yates | 2017 | 2017– | Shannon | |

More post-service details can be found on the respective lifeboat class pages.

=== Inshore lifeboats ===
==== D class ====
| Op.No. | Name | On station | Class | Comments |
|---|---|---|---|---|
| D-54 | Unnamed | 1965–1966 | D-class (RFD PB16) | |
| D-109 | Unnamed | 1967–1976 | D-class (RFD PB16) | |
| D-250 | Unnamed | 1977–1988 | D-class (Zodiac III) | |
| D-359 | 41 Club I | 1988–1996 | D-class (EA16) | |
| D-508 | John Saunderson | 1996–2006 | D-class (EA16) | |
| D-656 | William Robert Saunderson | 2007–2016 | D-class (IB1) | |
| D-793 | Dr Barbara Saunderson | 2016– | D-class (IB1) | |

=== Launch and recovery tractors ===
| Op.No. | Reg. No. | Type | On station | Comments |
|---|---|---|---|---|
| T2 | AH 5933 | Clayton | 1922 | |
| T14 | XW 2075 | Clayton | 1933–1946 | |
| T12 | LLY 75 | Clayton | 1946–1948 | |
| T40 | JXR 67 | Case LA | 1948–1956 | |
| T31 | FGU 821 | Case L | 1956–1961 | |
| T33 | FYP 356 | Case L | 1961–1964 | |
| T73 | 500 GYR | Case 1000D | 1964–1965 | |
| T72 | 518 GYM | Case 1000D | 1965–1969 | |
| T56 | MYR 426 | Fowler Challenger III | 1969–1977 | |
| T86 | SEL 395R | Talus MBC Case 1150B | 1977–1987 | |
| T102 | E387 VAW | Talus MB-H Crawler | 1987–1999 | |
| T94 | B567 FAW | Talus MB-H Crawler | 1999–2008 | |
| T91 | UAW 558Y | Talus MB-H Crawler | 2008–2017 | |
| SC-T14 | HF67 CAV | SLARS (Clayton) | 2017– | Named Roy Barker |

== See also ==
- List of RNLI stations
- List of former RNLI stations
- Royal National Lifeboat Institution lifeboats
