= Montrose Lifeboat Station =

RNLI lifeboat station in Angus, Scotland

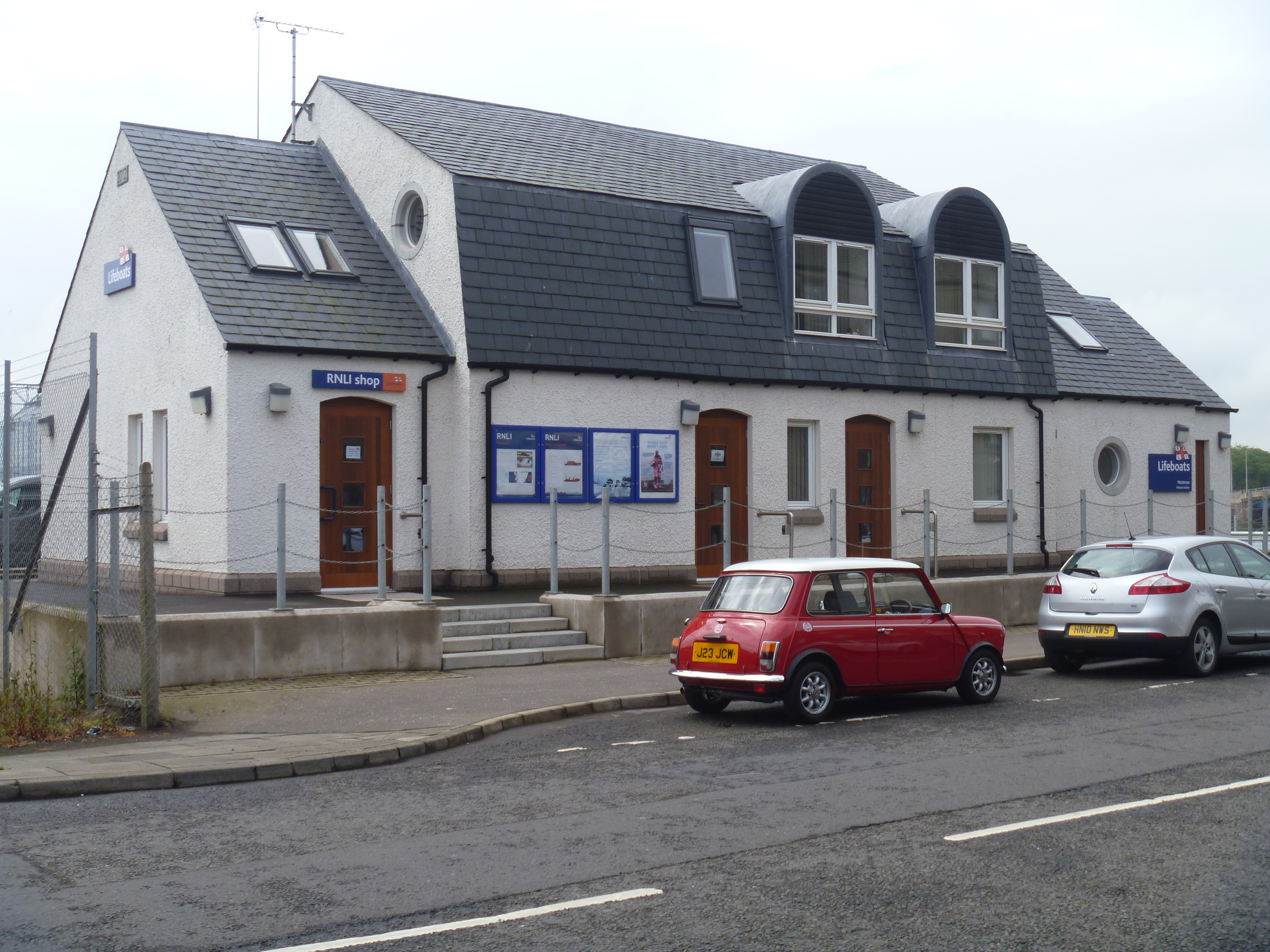
- Montrose Lifeboat Station

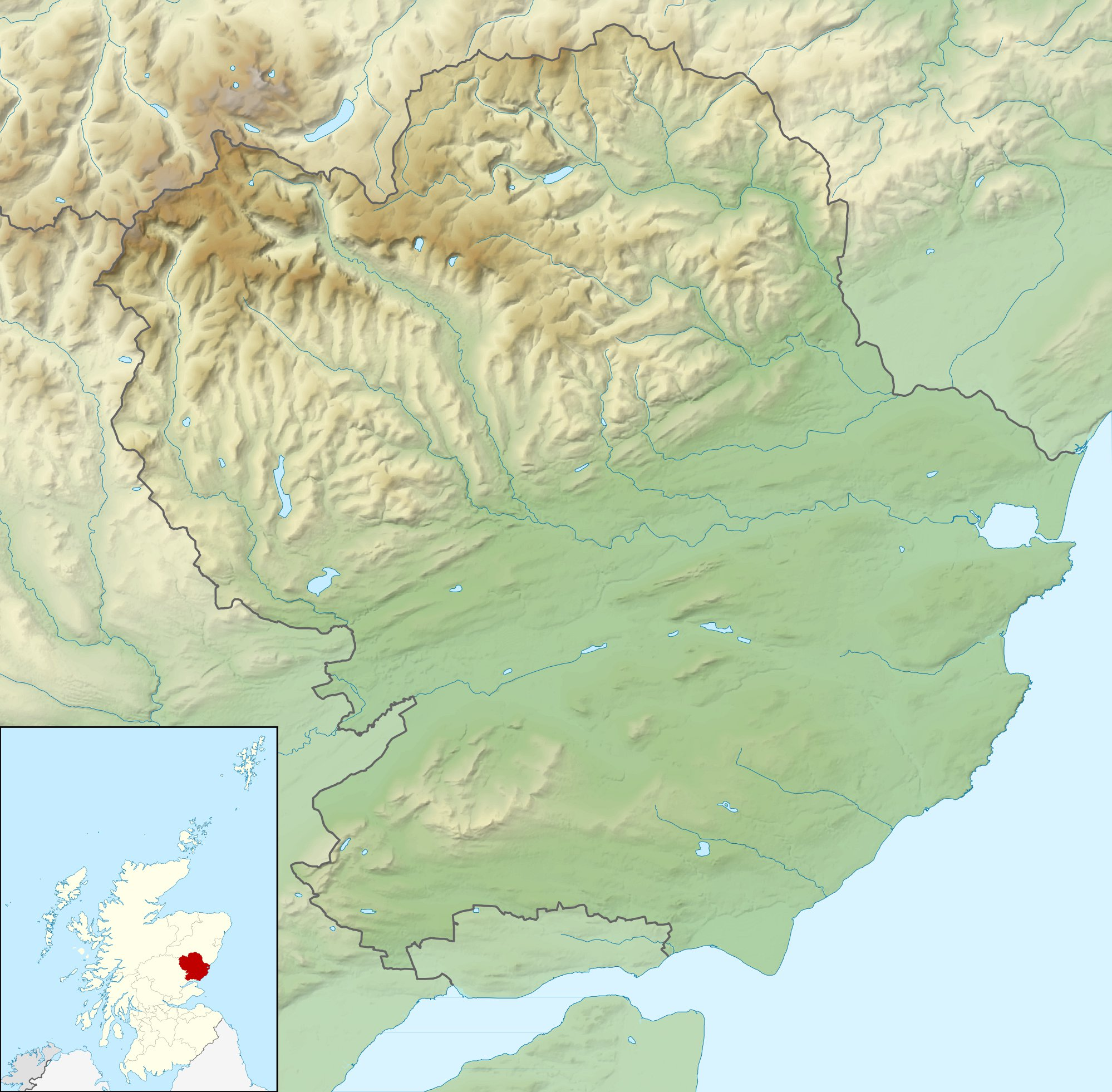
- Location within Angus

General information
- Type: RNLI Lifeboat Station
- Location: 33 Wharf St, Montrose, Angus, DD10 8BD, Scotland
- Coordinates: 56°42′24.6″N 2°28′19.9″W
- Opened: 1800 MLC; 1869 RNLI
- Owner: Royal National Lifeboat Institution

Website
- Montrose RNLI Lifeboat Station

Montrose Lifeboat Station is located at Wharf Street, in the harbour town and former royal burgh of Montrose, on the North Sea coast, 30 miles (48 km) northeast of Dundee, in Angus, Scotland.

A lifeboat was first stationed at Montrose in 1800, by the Montrose Lifeboat Committee (MLC). Management of the station was transferred to the Royal National Lifeboat Institution (RNLI) in 1869.

The station currently operates 13-10 Ian Grant Smith (ON 1317), a Shannon-class All-weather lifeboat, on station since 2015, and the smaller D-class (IB1) Inshore lifeboat, Margaret Olive (D-897), on station since January 2025.

== History ==
In the late 1700s, Montrose was already a thriving port, and in 1800, the Shipowners and Shipmasters from Montrose decided to acquire a lifeboat for Montrose. The boat was one of 31 commissioned from lifeboat builder Henry Greathead of South Shields.

It is recorded that the first lifeboat was launched 52 times, saving 164 lives. In May 1807, a lifeboat management committee was established, to raise funds for a replacement boat. It was felt that the existing boat was too heavy. Greathead agreed to build a smaller 8-oared boat, but fitted with 10 oars, for £130, which was commissioned in June 1807. The town council granted land at the south-west corner of the bleachfield, for the construction of a boathouse, which cost £63. A launch carriage was built by Robert Gibb of Lochside, Montrose, costing a further £84.

The committee managed to raise nine guineas locally (£9-9s-0d), with gifts of £20 from the town council, and £50 from the Insurance underwriters at Lloyd's of London. However, this clearly didn't cover the amounts needed, and even by 1818, the committee were still in debt. In June 1818, the lifeboat and all equipment was transferred to the management of the local Magistrates and town council, who agreed to pay off the outstanding amount, just under £50. In December 1818. the town council handed over management of the lifeboat to the Harbour Light Committee, an independent body elected by Shipowners and Masters. It was agreed that funding of the lifeboat would instead come from a toll on all vessels entering the harbour.

In 1869, following a visit by Capt. John Ward, Inspector of Lifeboats for the RNLI, it was agreed that the management of the station would be transferred to the RNLI. A new 33 ft (10 m) self-righting 'pulling and sailing' (P&S) lifeboat, one with oars and sails, was funded by the merchants of Mincing Lane, London, and duly named Mincing Lane. The existing lifeboat was retained as a No.2 lifeboat. A new lifeboat house was built on the north side of the River South Esk, close to the old lifeboat house, and a slipway constructed at a cost of £100.

A gift of £400 had been made to the RNLI by Mr Davies-Griffith of Caer Rhûn Hall in Conwy. The gift was appropriated to the (so far unnamed) No.2 lifeboat, which was then named Roman Governor of Caer Hun, after the Roman Villa and earthworks discovered on the donor's property. A new 30 ft (9.1 m) lifeboat in 1874 would be given the same name.

On 21 December 1872, the East Prussian brig Henriette of Memel, on passage from Sligo, was driven ashore on the sands north of Montrose. The lifeboat Mincing Lane (No.1) set out from the harbour, whilst the Roman Governor of Caer Hun (No.2) was hauled up the beach to the scene on her carriage before being launched. Approaching the wreck, the Coxswain and three crew were washed out of the No.1 lifeboat. Five men from the brig took their chance and jumped into the lifeboat, which then set about retrieving the four lifeboat crew, who by now had been in the water for 20 minutes. All four were recovered, but Coxswain William Mearns had been hit on the head by the ships rudder, and crewman Alexander Paton died some days later from exposure. The three remaining people aboard the Henrietta were rescued by the No.2 lifeboat. For this service, Coxswain William Mearns, (No.1 lifeboat), and his son Coxswain William Mearns Jnr., (No.2 lifeboat), were each awarded the RNLI Silver Medal. Coxswain William Mearns would later retire from the service on health grounds, due to injuries received that day.

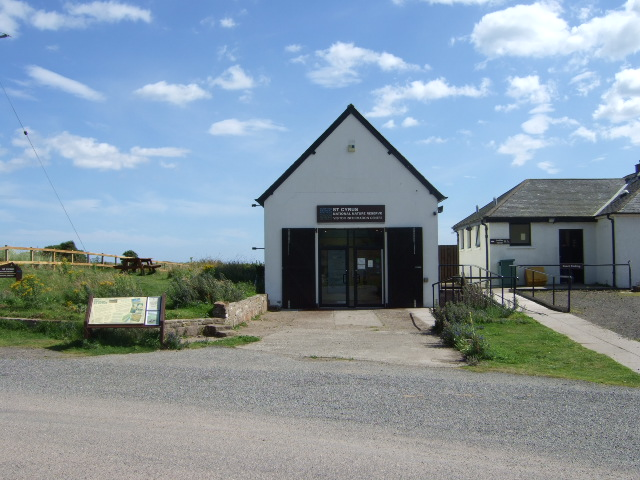
Montrose (Kirkside) 1885 Lifeboat station, now St Cyrus NNR Visitor Centre

In 1885, a third station was opened at Kirkside, some 4 miles (6.4 km) to the north of Montrose, at the mouth of the River North Esk. A place of frequent shipwrecks, it would save hauling one of the Montrose lifeboats to the site. A boathouse was constructed by James Ford & Sons, at a cost of £312-13-0d, and the 34 ft (10 m) lifeboat Resolute (ON 90) was placed on service. The boat was funded from the legacy of G. M. Grey of Dundee. The lifeboat would be launched just once, on 11 March 1887, but ran aground, and failed to carry out any service. No details are available of the casualty vessel. After five years of inactivity, the station was closed in 1892. The lifeboat was used for demonstration purposes until 1903, when it was broken up. The boathouse still exists, and is currently in use as the St Cyrus National Nature Reserve Visitor Centre.

Whilst on exercise in 1900, the No.1 lifeboat Robert Henderson (ON 367) was driven onto the rocks. No lives were lost, but the lifeboat was severely damaged, and withdrawn from service. A new boathouse was constructed for the new boat, Sarah Jane Turner (ON 465), and £100 was received for the sale of the old boathouse to the Montrose Harbour Board.

Montrose No.1 station would receive their first motor-powered lifeboat in 1926, the 45-foot 6in Watson John Russell (ON 699). At the same time, a launch tractor was placed at Montrose No.2 station replacing horses. It would be another 14 years before the 'pulling and sailing' No.2 lifeboat would be replaced, by the Surf-class lifeboat, the Norman Nasmith (ON 836). The Norman Nasmith remained at Montrose until the No.2 station was closed in 1950.

A new station building was constructed in 1989, providing improved crew facilities, and a souvenir shop. The 1900 boathouse would be demolished in 1998. In 1994, a D-class (EA16) Inshore lifeboat (D-398) was assigned to the station.

In 2015, the station would say goodbye to their long serving Tyne-class lifeboat 47-034 Moonbeam (ON 1152), which had been on station since 1989. Its replacement was a new £2.2 million Shannon-class lifeboat, which arrived on station on 21 August 2015. The lifeboat, the first Shannon-class lifeboat to be stationed in Scotland, was funded from the bequest of long-time RNLI supporter Ruth Grant Smith, who died in 2005. She requested that a lifeboat be named in memory of her late husband, to be placed at a station in Scotland. The couple had been long-time RNLI supporters, holding an annual New Years Eve fundraising party, at their home in Cromdale near Grantown-on-Spey. At a ceremony held on the 21 May 2016, the lifeboat was named 13-10 Ian Grant Smith (ON 1317).

== Station honours ==
The following are awards made at Montrose:

- RNIPLS Silver Medal
  David Edwards, Master Mariner – 1832
  Robert Mearns Jr., Master Mariner – 1832
  John Nichol, Master Mariner – 1832
  Alexander Coul, Fisherman – 1832
  Charles Coul, Fisherman – 1832
  Robert Japp, Fisherman – 1832
  William Finlay, Fisherman – 1832
  John Peart, Fisherman – 1832
  Alexander Watt, Fisherman – 1832
- RNLI Silver Medal
  William Mearns, Coxswain (No.1 lifeboat) – 1873
  William Mearns Jr., Coxswain (No.2 lifeboat) – 1873
  David Duncan, Coxswain (No.1 Lifeboat) – 1885
  James Watt, Coxswain – 1899
  David Mearns, Master of the steam trawler Southesk – 1913
- Medals and Diplomas, awarded by The Norwegian Government
  Crew of Montrose Lifeboat No.2 station – 1916
- 'The Thanks of the Institution inscribed on Vellum'
  David Duncan, Coxswain (No.1 Lifeboat) – 1884
  James Watt, Coxswain (No.2 Lifeboat) – 1884
  James C. Clark, Honorary Secretary – 1940
- 'A Framed Letter of Thanks signed by the Chairman of the Institution'
  James Robert Paton, Coxswain – 1970
  Each of the six crew members of the Montrose lifeboat – 1970
- British Empire Medal
  James Robert Paton, Coxswain – 1972QBH
- Member, Order of the British Empire (MBE)
  Capt. Niall A. McNab, Honorary Secretary – 2000NYH
  Joyce Marr, Johnshaven Ladies Guild – 2000QBH

== Roll of honour ==
In memory of those lost whilst serving at Montrose:

- Died 29 December 1872 from the effects of exposure, following service to the East Prussian brig Henriette of Memel on 21 December 1872.
  Alexander Smith Paton (24)

== Montrose lifeboats ==
=== Montrose Lifeboat Committee ===
ON (Note: ON is the RNLI's Official Number of the boat.)	Name	Built	On station	Class	Comments
−	Unknown	1800	1800−1807	Greathead	(Note: 30 ft 0 in (9.14 m) (10-oared) Greathead-class non-self-righting lifeboat, funded by local subscription, built by Henry Greathead of South Shields.)
−	Unknown	1807	1807−1834	Greathead	(Note: 10-oared Greathead-class non-self-righting lifeboat, funded by local subscription, built by Henry Greathead of South Shields, at a cost of £130.)
Pre-164	Unnamed	1834	1834−1869	25-foot North Country	(Note: 25 ft 0 in (7.62 m) x 8 ft 3 in (2.51 m) (8-oared) North Country non-self-righting lifeboat, funded by the Montrose Harbour Trust, built by William Wake of Sunderland, costing £100.); Transferred to Montrose No.2 in 1869.

Pre ON numbers are unofficial numbers used by the Lifeboat Enthusiasts' Society to reference early lifeboats not included on the official RNLI list.

=== Montrose / Montrose No.1 Station ===
==== Pulling and Sailing (P&S) lifeboats ====
ON	Name	Built	On station	Class	Comments
Pre-524	Mincing Lane	1869	1869−1887	33-foot self-righting (P&S)	(Note: 33 ft 0 in (10.06 m) x 8 ft 7 in (2.62 m) (10-oared) self-righting (P&S) lifeboat, gift of the Mincing Lane LB Fund, built by Forrestt of Limehouse, London, costing £282.); Broken up in 1887.
113	Augusta	1887	1887–1894	37-foot self-righting (P&S)	(Note: 37 ft 0 in (11.28 m) x 8 ft 0 in (2.44 m) (12-oared) self-righting (P&S) lifeboat, gift of Lady Wood, of Bath, built by Forrestt of Limehouse, London, costing £449.); Sold in 1894.
367	Robert Henderson	1894	1894−1900	38-foot self-righting (P&S)	(Note: 38 ft 0 in (11.58 m) x 8 ft 0 in (2.44 m) (12-oared) self-righting (P&S) lifeboat, legacy of Mr P. Henderson of London, built by McAlister of Dumbarton, costing £476.); Wrecked on exercise, 23 March 1900.
196	May	1888	1900–1901	37-foot self-righting (P&S)	(Note: 37 ft 0 in (11.28 m) x 8 ft 0 in (2.44 m) (12-oared) self-righting (P&S) lifeboat, built by D. and W. Henderson and Company of Partick, costing £542 when new.); Reserve lifeboat, previously at Buddon Ness. Broken up in 1902.
465	Sarah Jane Turner	1901	1901−1924	37-foot self-righting (P&S)	(Note: 37 ft 0 in (11.28 m) x 9 ft 3 in (2.82 m) (10-oared) self-righting (P&S) lifeboat, gift of the late Sir Samuel Turner, of Rochdale, built by Thames Ironworks of Blackwall, London, costing £911.); Transferred to the Relief fleet. Later at Llandudno.
437	Civil Service No.3	1899	1924−1926	37-foot self-righting (P&S)	(Note: 37 ft 0 in (11.28 m) x 9 ft 3 in (2.82 m) (12-oared) self-righting (P&S) lifeboat, funded by the Civil Service LB fund, built by Thames Ironworks, of Blackwall, London, costing £857.); Previously at Portpatrick. Transferred to the Relief fleet. Sold in 1927.

==== Motor lifeboats ====
ON	Op.No. (Note: Op.No. is the RNLI's Operational Number of the boat carried on the hull.)	Name	Built	On station	Class	Comments
699	−	John Russell	1926	1926−1939	45-foot 6in Watson	Transferred to the Relief fleet. Later at Fraserburgh.
821	−	The Good Hope	1939	1939−1972	46-foot Watson	
1019	48-014	Lady MacRobert	1972	1972−1989	Solent	
1152	47-034	Moonbeam	1989	1989−2015	Tyne	
1317	13-10	Ian Grant Smith	2015	2015−	Shannon	

More post-service details can be found on the respective lifeboat class pages.

=== Montrose No.2 Station ===
ON	Name	Built	On station	Class	Comments
Pre-164	Roman Governor of Caer Hun	1834	1869−1874	25-foot North Country	Previously unnamed at Montrose No.1.
Pre-590	Roman Governor of Caer Hun	1874	1874−1889	30-foot Montrose self-righting (P&S)	(Note: 30 ft 0 in (9.14 m) x 8 ft 0 in (2.44 m) (8-oared) Montrose-class (Prowse) self-righting (P&S) lifeboat, gift of Mr H. Davies Griffiths, built by Forrestt of Limehouse, London, costing £275.); Sold in 1891.
253	Bessie Webster	1889	1889−1901	31-foot self-righting (P&S)	(Note: 31 ft 0 in (9.45 m) x 7 ft 3 in (2.21 m) (10-oared) self-righting (P&S) lifeboat, gift of Mrs G. Webster of London, built by Forrestt of Limehouse, London, costing £301.); Sold in 1901.
448	Marianne Atherstone	1900	1901−1940	34-foot Dungeness self-righting (P&S)	(Note: 34 ft 0 in (10.36 m) x 8 ft 0 in (2.44 m) (10-oared) Dungeness-class (Rubie) self-righting (P&S) lifeboat, legacy of Mr J. G. Atherstone of Montrose, built by Thames Ironworks, costing £686.); Sold in 1942.
836	Norman Nasmith	1940	1940−1950	Surf	

No.2 Station closed, 1950.

=== Montrose No.3 Station (Kirkside) ===
ON	Name	Built	On station	Class	Comments
90	Resolute	1885	1885−1892	34-foot self-righting (P&S)	(Note: 34 ft 0 in (10.36 m) x 8 ft 0 in (2.44 m) (10-oared) self-righting (P&S) lifeboat, legacy of Mr G. M. Gray of Dundee, and Whanganui, NZ, built by Woolfe of Shadwell, London, costing £345.); Transferred to the Relief fleet as Reserve No. D5, for demonstration purposes. Broken up in 1903.

No.3 Station (Kirkside) closed, 1892.

=== Inshore lifeboats ===
Op.No.	Name	On station	Class	Comments
D-398	Victory Wheelers	1994	D-class (EA16)	
D-439	Phyllis Mary	1995	D-class (EA16)	
D-481	Holme Team 3	1995–2004	D-class (EA16)	Funded by the regulars of the Fleece Inn, Holmfirth
D-626	David Leslie Wilson	2004–2014	D-class (IB1)	
D-764	Nigel A Kennedy	2014–2025	D-class (IB1)	
D-897	Margaret Olive	2025–	D-class (IB1)	

=== Launch and recovery tractors ===
==== Montrose No.2 Station ====
Op.No.	Reg.No.	Type	On station	Comments
T17	SR 5361	Clayton	1926–1936	
T10	AH 9213	Clayton	1936–1947	
T14	XW 2075	Clayton	1947–1950	

== See also ==
- List of RNLI stations
- List of former RNLI stations
- Royal National Lifeboat Institution lifeboats
