= Port Logan Lifeboat Station =

Former lifeboat station in Dumfries and Galloway, Scotland

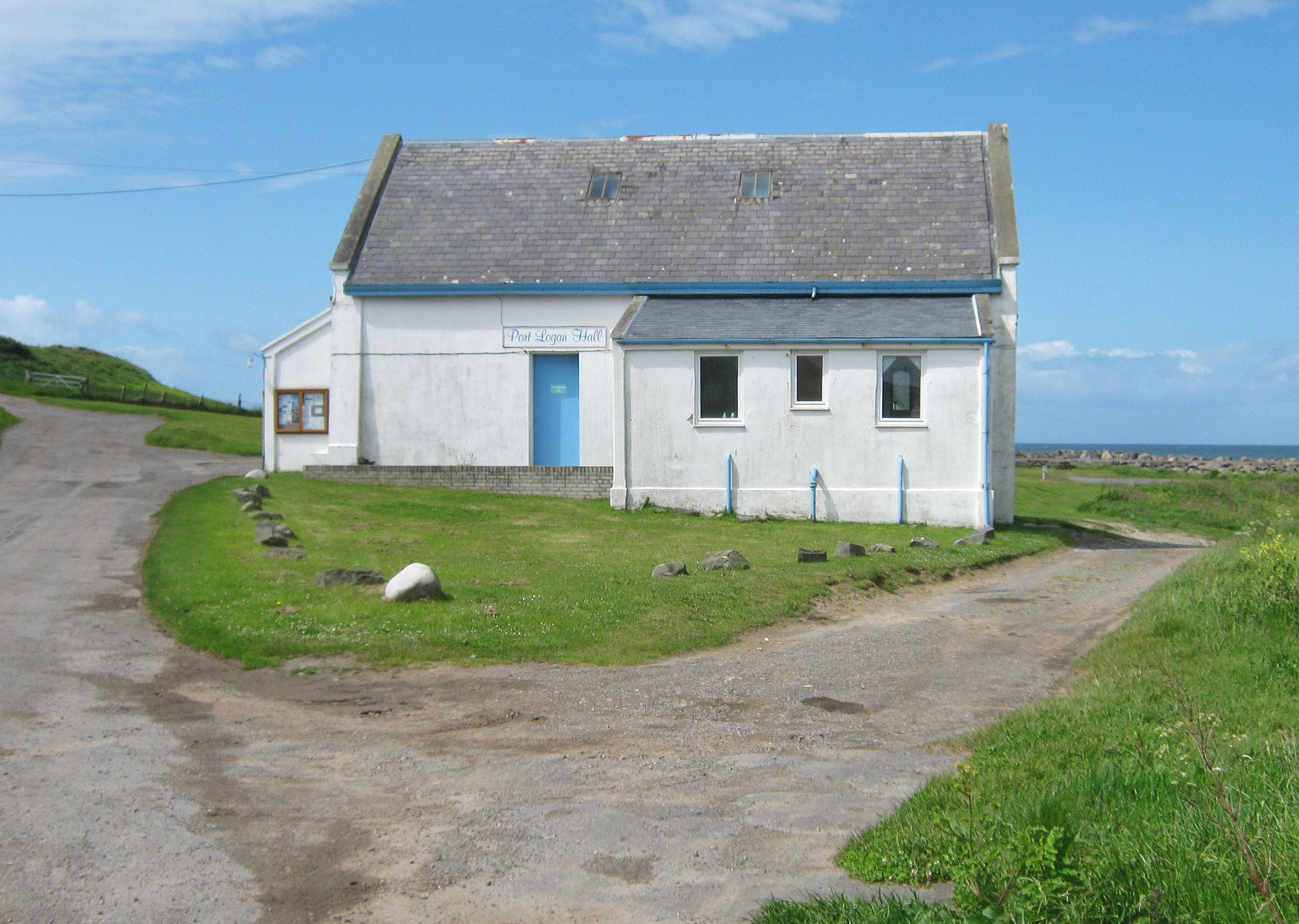
- Former Lifeboat Station, Port Logan

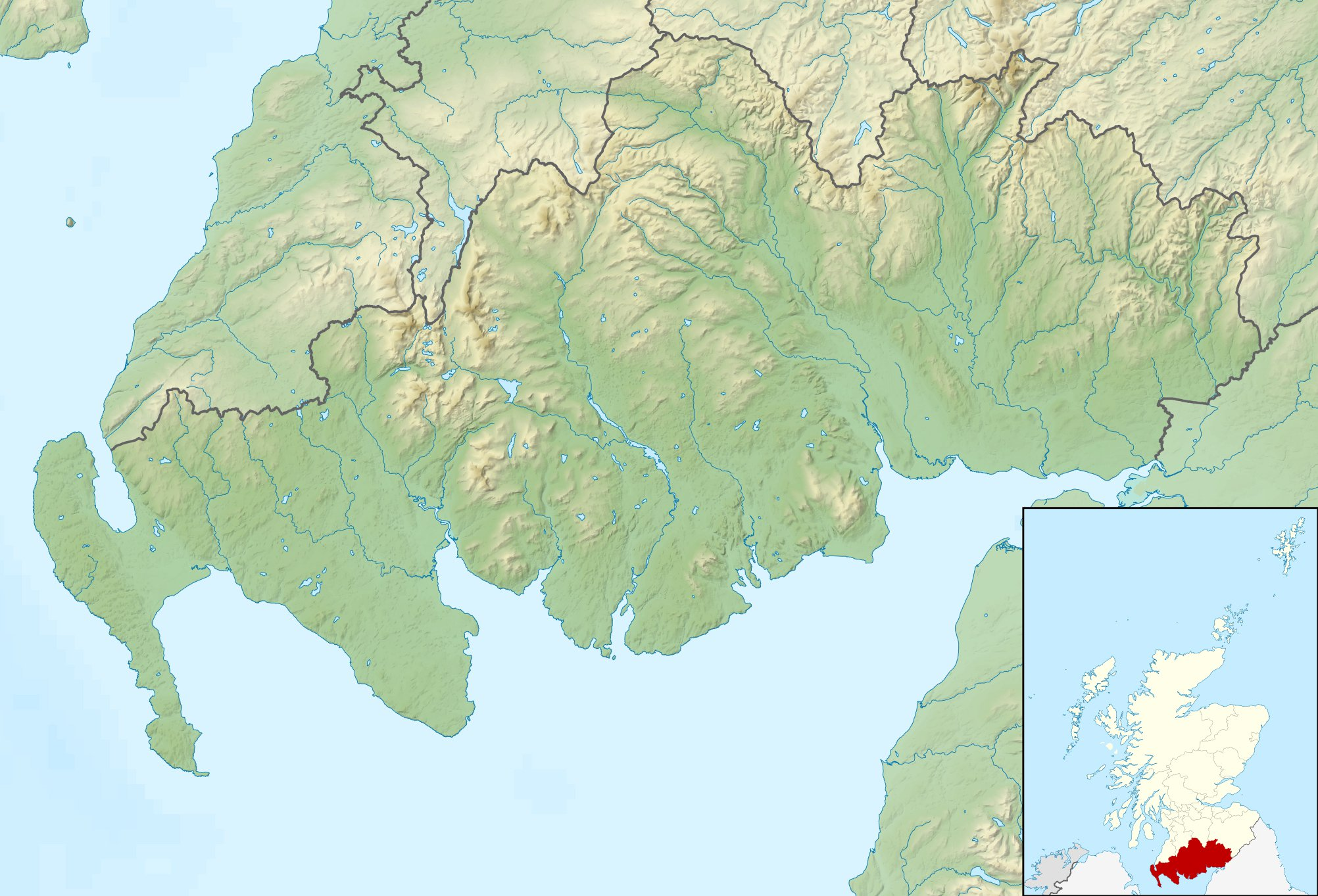
- Port Logan, Dumfries and Galloway

General information
- Status: Closed
- Type: RNLI Lifeboat Station
- Location: Lifeboat Station, Port Logan, Dumfries and Galloway, DG9 9NQ, Scotland
- Coordinates: 54°43′21.8″N 4°57′33.9″W
- Opened: December 1866
- Closed: 1932

Port Logan Lifeboat Station was located on the west coast of the Rhins of Galloway, approximately 14 miles (23 km) south of Stranraer in the county of Dumfries and Galloway, historically Wigtownshire, in south-west Scotland.

A lifeboat was first stationed at Port Logan by the Royal National Lifeboat Institution (RNLI) in 1866.

Port Logan Lifeboat Station closed in 1932.

== History ==
In the July 1867 edition of the RNLI journal 'The Lifeboat', it was reported that a new lifeboat station had been established at Port Logan, on the western side of the Mull of Galloway. A 30-foot self-righting 'Pulling and Sailing' (P&S) lifeboat, one with (10) oars and sails, costing £232, along with its equipment and transporting carriage, had been conveyed free of charge via Edinburgh and Glasgow to Stranraer, by the generosity of the Great Northern, North Eastern, North British Caledonian, and Glasgow and South Western Railway Companies. From there, it was transported on its carriage to Port Logan, where a large crowd witnessed the arrival in December 1866.

A boathouse was constructed on the south side of the village on Port Logan Bay, and the location of the station was ideally suited. If required, the lifeboat could be transported over to the east coast of the Galloway peninsula, to be launched into Luce Bay.

The cost of the lifeboat had been funded through the donation of £310 from the Edinburgh Working Men's Clubs, primarily down to the efforts of Mr R. M. Ballantyne, and the lifeboat had been exhibited in both Edinburgh and Glasgow, before being transported to Port Logan. The lifeboat was duly named Edinburgh and R. M. Ballantyne.

Exactly one year to the day since the lifeboat had been exhibited in Glasgow, on the night of 16 December 1867, the barque Strathleven, on passage from Demerara to Glasgow, was wrecked about seven miles from Port Logan. Two crew set out in a small boat to raise the alarm, and although thrown on the rocks, they managed to scramble ashore. The Port Logan lifeboat was dispatched, and 15 men found clinging to the rigging were rescued. It was later noted that the wife of the Captain had made a donation to the very lifeboat which had saved her husband, when it was exhibited in Glasgow on 16 December 1866.

When the barque Britannia of North Shields, on passage to Greenock from Mauritius, was driven ashore on the night of 12 January 1875, the crew saved themselves by climbing over the rocks at low tide. However, the 14 men tasked to salvage the goods from the vessel were caught by a storm, and were rescued, after great difficulty, by the Port Logan lifeboat Edinburgh and R. M. Ballantyne.

A second lifeboat named Edinburgh and R. M. Ballantyne (ON 86) was placed at Port Logan in 1887, serving for another seven years. In turn, it was replaced by the Frederick Allen (ON 364), funded from the legacy of the late Miss E. C. Allen.

Following reports of the brigantine Prospect in difficulties off Drummore, on passage to Portaferry with a cargo of coal on 25 January 1897, the lifeboat was transported to Scratby Bay, and launched at 12:30 into moderate gale-force winds and snow showers. Her crew of four were rescued, and landed at Drummore at 18:00. The boat was left there overnight, the roads blocked by snow, and was returned to Port Logan the following day with great difficulty.

On the 5 November 1911, the schooner Glide with a cargo of coal, was in trouble at Drummore, off the east coast of the peninsula. The lifeboat Thomas McCunn (ON 575), on station since 1907, was transported near to the scene, launched into a hurricane, and retrieved the three crew from the vessel.

At a meeting of the RNLI committee of management on Thursday 14 January 1932, it was decided to close the Port Logan Lifeboat Station.

The station building still exists, and is in use as the village hall. The lifeboat on station at the time of closure, Thomas McCunn (ON 575), was sold from service, and was last reported as a yacht in the 1970s.

== Port Logan lifeboats ==
=== Pulling and Sailing (P&S) lifeboats ===
ON (Note: ON is the RNLI's Official Number of the boat.)	Name	Built	On station	Class	Comments
Pre-480	Edinburgh and R. M. Ballantyne	1866	1866−1887	30-foot Self-righting (P&S)	(Note: 30-foot x 7-foot 1in (10-oared) self-righting (P&S) lifeboat, gift of the Edinburgh Working People and Ladies LB Fund, built by Forrestt of Limehouse, London, costing £232.)
86	Edinburgh and R. M. Ballantyne	1887	1887−1894	34-foot Self-righting (P&S)	(Note: 34-foot x 7-foot 6in (10-oared) self-righting (P&S) lifeboat, gift of the Edinburgh Working People and Ladies Endowment Fund, Built by Woolfe of Shadwell, London, costing £328.)
364	Frederick Allen	1894	1894−1906	34-foot Self-righting (P&S)	(Note: 34-foot x 8-foot (10-oared) self-righting (P&S) lifeboat, legacy of Miss E. C. Allen of London, built by Waterman of Cremyll, costing £404.)
575	Thomas McCunn	1907	1907−1932	35-foot Rubie Self-righting (P&S)	(Note: 35-foot x 8-foot 10in (10-oared) Dungeness-class (Rubie) self-righting (P&S) lifeboat, legacy of Mr W. McCunn of Largs, built by Thames Ironworks of Blackwall, London, costing £1,014.)

=== Launch and recovery tractors ===
Op. No. (Note: Op. No. is the RNLI's Operational Number of the boat carried on the hull or vehicle.)	Reg. No.	Type	On station	Comments
T14	XW 2075	Clayton	1925–1932	

== See also ==
- List of RNLI stations
- List of former RNLI stations
- Royal National Lifeboat Institution lifeboats
