= Sharpness Point =

Headland in Tyne and Wear, England

Coordinates: 55.02335°N 1.41887°W

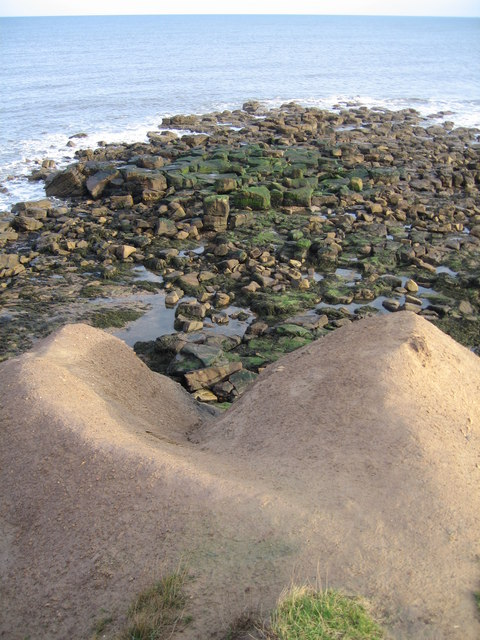
Sharpness Point

Sharpness Point is a small headland projecting into the North Sea at Tynemouth, Tyne and Wear. The O.S. grid reference is NZ371699.

It is the only promontory in Northumberland with the -ness suffix. The word ness is a geographical term for a promontory, cape or headland, a strip of land projecting into a body of water, and derives from the Old English næs, meaning headland (related to Old Norse nes).

== See also ==
- Geordie dialect words
