= Guide Gift Week =

Guide Gift Week was a fundraising appeal by the Girl Guides throughout the British Empire in 1940. The United Kingdom was at this time engaged in World War II and much of the money raised was used to help those in the Armed Forces.

An announcement in April 1940 in the magazine The Guider appealed for a total of £20,000. Two air ambulances, being "the first specially constructed ambulance aircraft to be used by the R.A.F. in the war", cost a total of £15,000 and the remaining £5,000 was to be spent on a lifeboat.

Money was to be raised directly from the members, each being asked to contribute half a day's salary or income. Younger members raised money by doing odd jobs, such as gardening and child care.

At the end of the designated week £46,217 had been raised and money continued to be added to the fund.

Money raised in Guide Gift Week finally bought:

- two air ambulances
- a lifeboat, later named the Guide of Dunkirk
- two mobile canteens to be run by the YMCA
- equipment for rest huts for the British Army
- furnishing and equipment for the Trefoil Hut in Iceland for the Merchant Navy
- twenty motor ambulances for the Royal Navy.

The British Film Institute holds footage of the presentations of many of these items.
