= Shannon-class lifeboat =

Lifeboat of the British RNLI

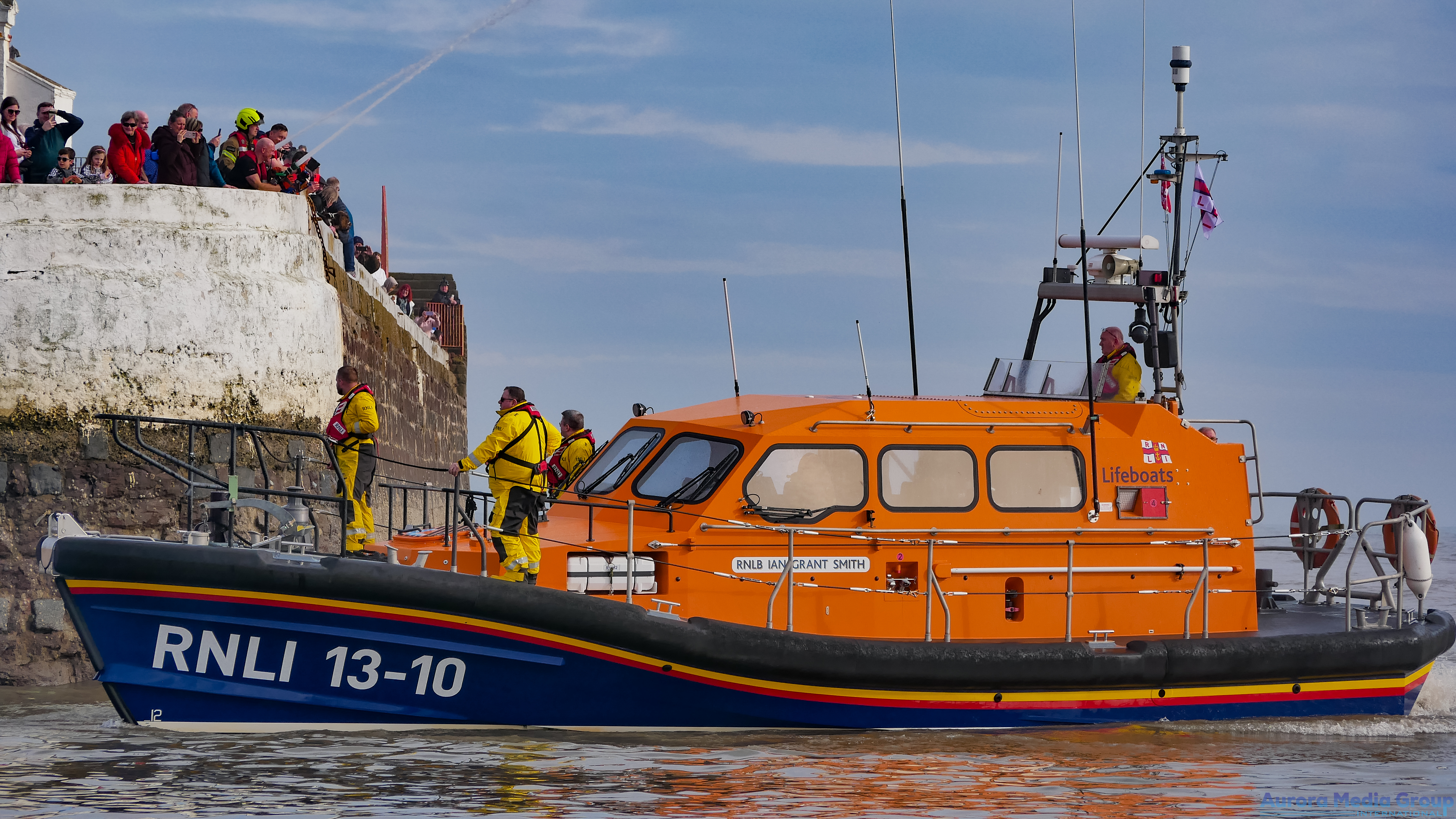
- Montrose Lifeboat, 13-10 entering Arbroath Harbour

Class overview
- Builders: 2005-2016 SAR Composites Ltd / Berthon Boat Company; 2016–2017 SAR Composites Ltd / RNLI; 2017– RNLI
- Operators: Royal National Lifeboat Institution
- Preceded by: Mersey-class; Tyne-class; Trent-class; Severn-class
- Cost: £2.7m
- Built: 2012–
- In service: Spring 2013–
- Planned: 60+
- Building: 3
- Completed: 59
- Active: 46 In service; 10 Relief fleet; 3 Not yet on service

General characteristics (1st Experimental boat, Camarc hull)
- Displacement: 14.6 long tons (15 t)
- Length: 13.6 m (44 ft 7 in)
- Beam: 4.54 m (14 ft 11 in)
- Draught: 0.75 m (2 ft 6 in)
- Propulsion: 2 × Scania DI13 engines, 650 hp (485 kW); 2 × Hamilton HJ 364 Waterjets
- Speed: 27 knots (31 mph; 50 km/h)
- Range: 250 nmi (460 km)
- Complement: 5-6

General characteristics (Prototype, RNLI hull)
- Displacement: 17 long tons (17 t)
- Length: 13.6 m (44 ft 7 in)
- Beam: 4.5 m (14 ft 9 in)
- Draught: 1.0 m (3 ft 3 in)
- Propulsion: 2 × Scania DI13M, 650 hp (485 kW); 2 × Hamilton HJ 364 Waterjets
- Speed: 25 knots (29 mph; 46 km/h)
- Range: 250 nmi (460 km)
- Complement: 6 crew (survivor capacity 23 self-righting or 79 not self-righting)

The Shannon-class lifeboat (previously FCB2 – Fast Carriage Boat 2) is the latest class of lifeboat currently being deployed to the RNLI fleet to serve the shores of the British Isles. While the Shannon class has mainly replaced the Mersey-class lifeboats, it has also replaced some Tyne-class and Trent-class lifeboats, and a Severn-class lifeboat.

All of the following fleet details are referenced to the 2026 Lifeboat Enthusiast Society Handbook, with information retrieved directly from RNLI records.

== Development ==
The experimental boat, named Effseabee Too underwent sea trials during 2005–2008. It is based on a Camarc Pilot vessel design, and was designed by RNLI engineers, with a fibre-reinforced composite hull, powered by twin water jets. It had a top speed of approximately 30 knots (55 km/h; 35 mph), but was planned to be rated down to 25–27 knots (46–50 km/h; 29–31 mph) when the final design was put into production.

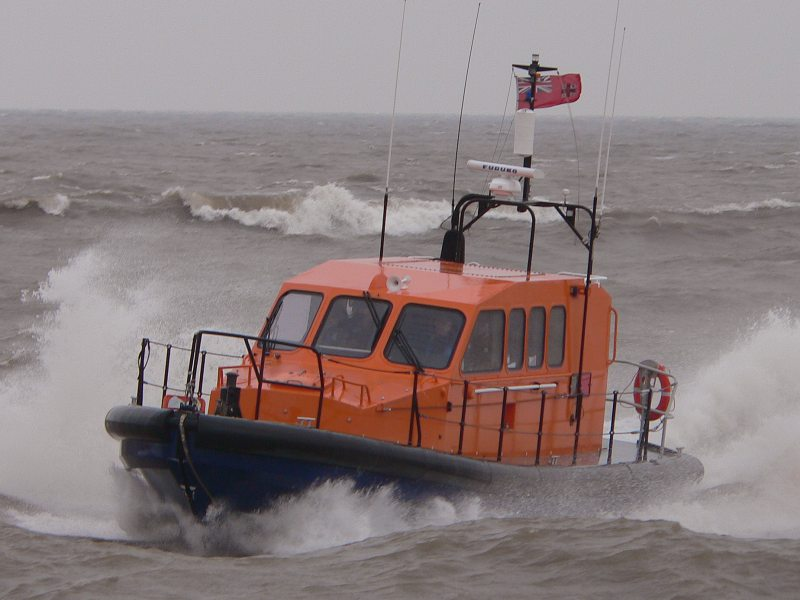
FCB2, the prototype boat

In 2008, FCB2 development was delayed due to hull shape issues, as trials showed crews would be subjected to unacceptable shocks and excessive horizontal shaking in high seas. The RNLI indicated that the project would be extended by at least three more years to research a new hull shape.

In April 2009 it was announced a new hull had been chosen. The Shannon class prototype boat was completed late 2011 when active service was expected to start in mid-2013.

In April 2011 it was announced the class would be named after the River Shannon, the longest river in Ireland. This is the first time that the name of an Irish river has been used for a class of RNLI lifeboat.

After boatyard acceptance in March 2012 the first of the fleet went through sea acceptance trials in 2012.

== Production ==
Early hulls were moulded by SAR Composites at Lymington, a subsidiary of the RNLI, which had also taken over the Southampton boat-builder Green Marine. Fitting out of Shannon lifeboats was undertaken by the Berthon Boat Co. of Lymington (BBC), the last being the Swanage lifeboat 13-13 George Thomas Lacy (ON 1320) in 2016.

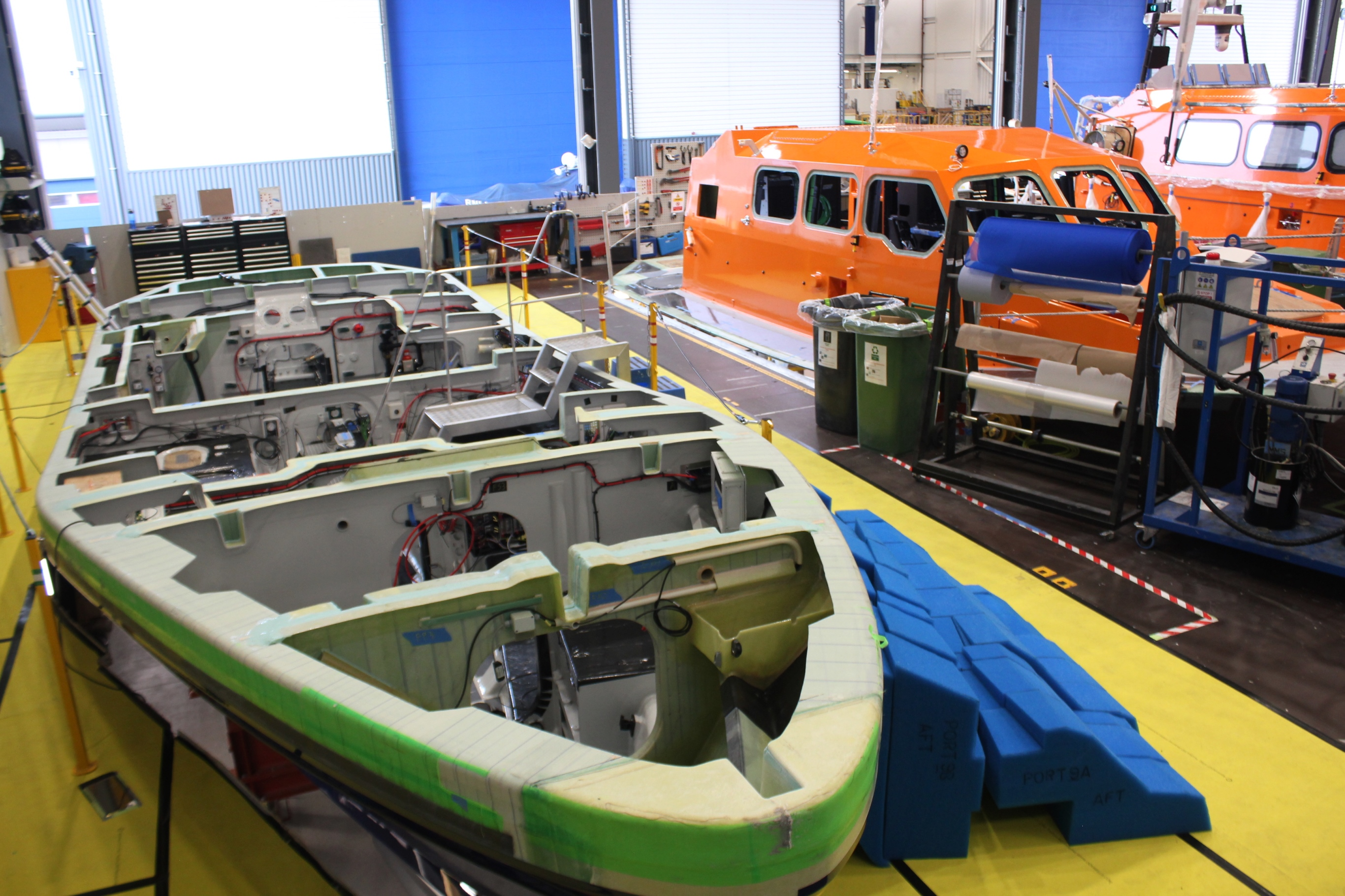
Shannon production at RNLI ALC

The RNLI opened their All-weather Lifeboat Centre (ALC) production facility at Poole in October 2015, designed to bring construction, repair and maintenance of the RNLI lifeboats under one roof for the first time. The facility, projected to cost £11.2 million, was designed to see a production cost saving of £3.7 million per annum. The centre would initially take-over fitting out process of the Shannon lifeboats. Following work by SAR and BBC, the first lifeboat completed at the ALC was 13-12 Cosandra (ON 1319). Work at SAR continued until all hull moulding operations were transferred from the Lymington facility.

Girvan lifeboat 13-23 Elizabeth and Gertrude Allan (ON 1330) was the first Shannon lifeboat built entirely at the ALC, with her official launch coming on 5 September 2017.

== Service ==
The first Shannon-class to be delivered for service was demonstrated at Dungeness, Kent on 21 February 2014. The boat, to begin active service the following month, has been named The Morrell in honour of Barbara Morrell, a keen fundraiser for the RNLI who bequeathed the service £6 million which she asked to be used for a lifeboat for Kent.

The Shannon class uses similar Systems and Information Management System (SIMS) technology to that of the Tamar-class lifeboat so that crew members can operate all of the boat's systems collaboratively without leaving their seats. Crew seats are also similar to the Tamar, sprung to reduce the shocks in heavy seas.

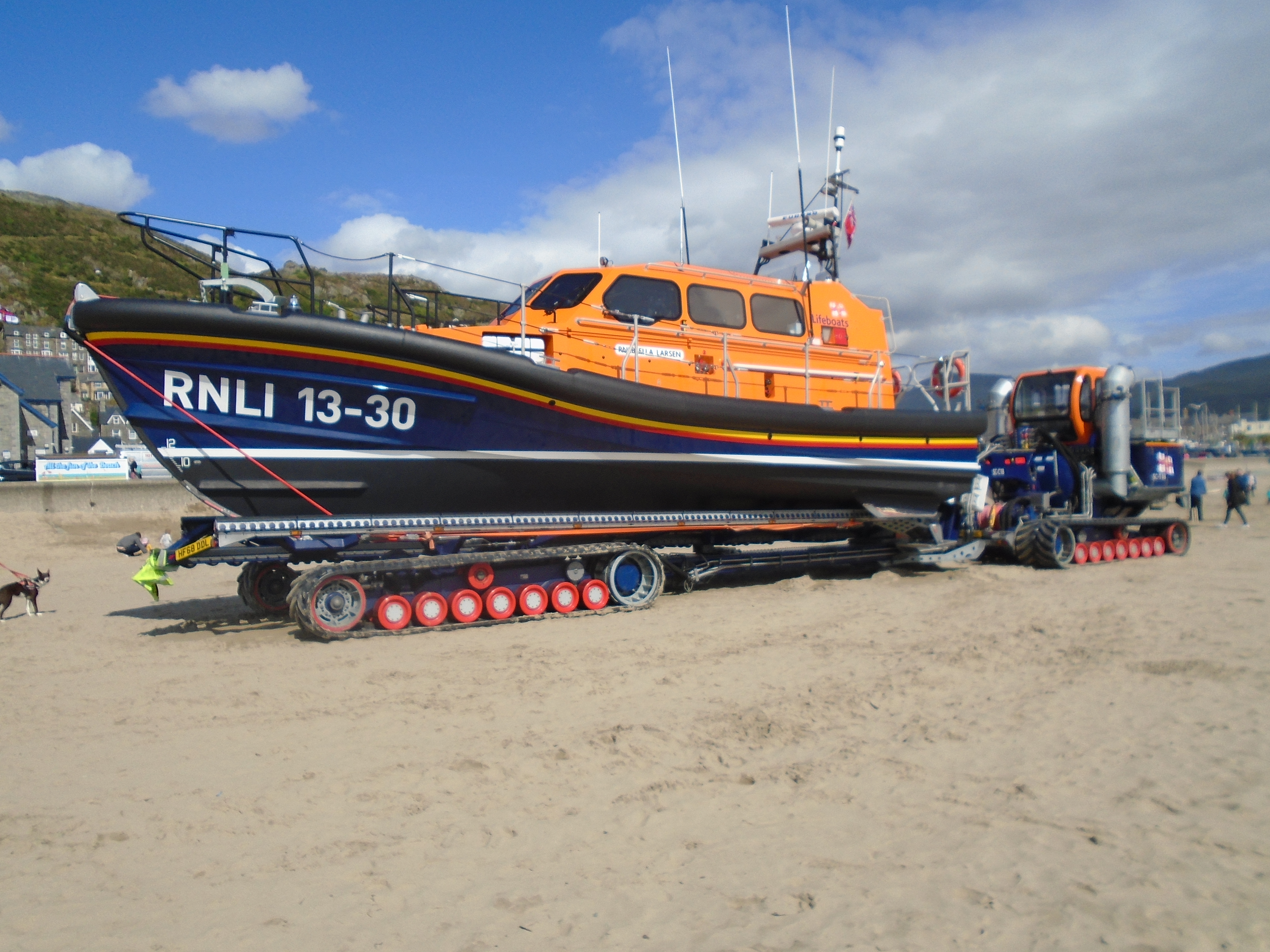
Barmouth Shannon and SLARS

At many stations Shannons are launched by a newly designed Shannon Launch and Recovery System (SLARS) by which a tractor propels the lifeboat on its cradle into the water. The cradle is then tilted and acts as a mobile slipway as the boat is launched by release of a single bow strop from the wheelhouse, rather than the old carriage launched method of four chains being released by crew members on deck. Recovery is bow first onto the cradle, which then rotates through 180 degrees, enabling the boat to be launched again within ten minutes.

An increasing number of Shannons are kept afloat at moorings or a pontoon berth as they replace the Trent-class. Swanage currently has a slipway launched Shannon, although a long gentle sloping slipway is required, to avoid damage to the water-jets. The boat at Workington uses the same davit crane system as the previous Tyne-class lifeboat.

== Launch-a-Memory and Legacy lifeboats ==
By 2024, the cost of each Shannon lifeboat had risen to £2.78M.

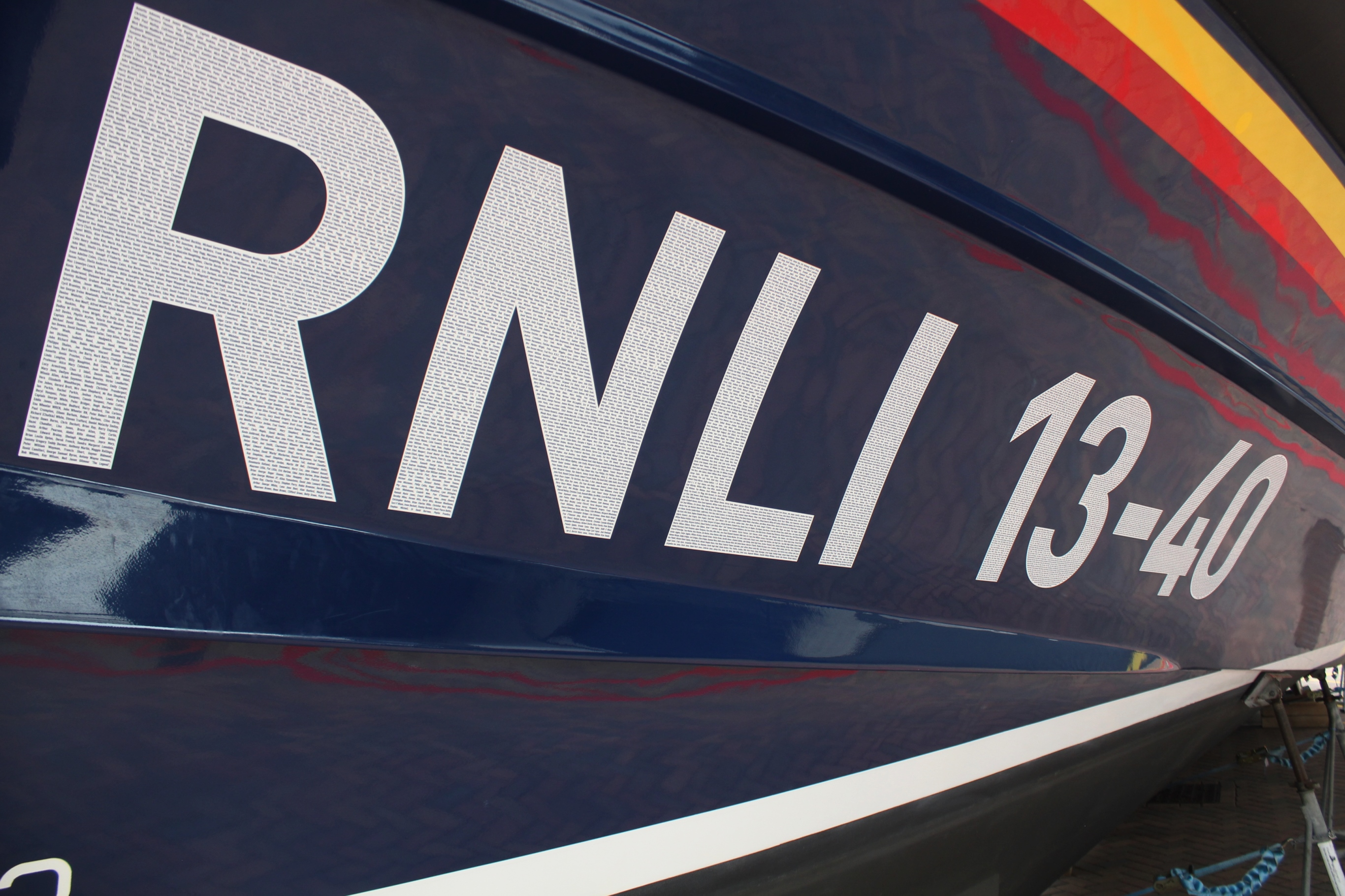
Launch a Memory names in numbers

As part of a fundraising effort, the construction costs of 13-12 Cosandra (ON 1319) in 2016 were offset, with members of the public allowed to purchase a space, to place a person's name, within the lifeboats numbers on the hull and the wheelhouse.

This idea was taken a step further in 2019/20, when a formal campaign known as "Launch a Memory" was introduced to help fund new lifeboats. With typically 10,000 spaces available on each lifeboat, a suggested donation of £30 per space raised £300,000. In 2024, the idea was extended to older Shannon lifeboats following a refit.

There are also two "Legacy" lifeboats, carrying names of those people who pledged a gift to the Institution in a Will.

With some of these lifeboats afloat at their stations, often a banner will be found outside the station, showing all the names.

Launch a Memory

- 13-03 R and J Welburn (ON 1310), Exmouth
- 13-13 George Thomas Lacy (ON 1320), Swanage
- 13-37 Agnes A. P. Barr (ON 1344), Invergordon
- 13-40 Eric's Legend (ON 1347), Relief fleet
- 13-43 St Christopher (ON 1350), Clifden
- 13-46 Duke of Edinburgh (Civil Service No.53) (ON 1353), Wells-next-the-Sea
- 13-47 Robert and Catherine Steen (ON 1354), Anstruther
- 13-49 Lois Ivan (ON 1356), Whitby

Legacy

- 13-44 George and Frances Phelon (ON 1351), Great Yarmouth and Gorleston
- 13-57 Bobby Cameron (ON 1364), Kilkeel

== Shannon-class lifeboat fleet ==
ON (Note: ON is the RNLI's Official Number of the boat.)	Op. No. (Note: Op. No. is the RNLI's Operational Number of the boat carried on the hull.)	Name	In service	Station (Note: (Brackets) used to signify that a boat is assigned to a specific station, but isn't yet at that location)	Launch method (Note: Relief boats use the launch method of the station they are covering. Boats are capable of any of the launch methods but may require minor modification.)	MMSI	Comments
1285	FCB2	Effseabee Two	2005–2008	Experimental boat	Afloat	244810618	(Note: Sold 2013. Renamed BMS Noorman, a Rescue/Salvage/Crew tender at Lauwersoog, Netherlands)
1308	13-01	Jock and Annie Slater	2012–2019	Relief fleet	–	235091414	
1308	13-01	Jock and Annie Slater	2019–2020	Wicklow	Afloat	235091414	
1308	13-01	Jock and Annie Slater	2020–	Relief fleet	–	235091414	
1309	13-02	The Morrell	2014–	Dungeness	SLARS	235101095	
1310	13-03	R and J Welburn	2014–	Exmouth	SLARS	235101096	
1311	13-04	Storm Rider	2014–	Relief fleet	–	235101097	
1312	13-05	Patsy Knight	2014–	Lowestoft	Afloat	235101098	
1313	13-06	Edmund Hawthorn Micklewood	2014–	Hoylake	SLARS	235106573	
1314	13-07	Reg	2015–	Relief fleet	–	235106574	
1315	13-08	Derek Bullivant	2015–	Lough Swilly	Afloat	235106575	
1316	13-09	The Barry and Peggy High Foundation	2015–2026	Ilfracombe	SLARS	235106576	Withdrawn from Ilfracombe, 19 September 2026.
1316	13-09	The Barry and Peggy High Foundation	2026–	Relief fleet		235106576	Withdrawn from Ilfracombe, 19 September 2026.
1317	13-10	Ian Grant Smith	2015–	Montrose	Afloat	235106578	
1318	13-11	Nora Stachura	2015–	St Ives	SLARS	235106579	
1319	13-12	Cosandra	2016–	Relief fleet	–	235106581	
1320	13-13	George Thomas Lacy	2016–	Swanage	Slipway	235106583	
1321	13-14	Kenneth James Pierpoint	2016–	Fleetwood	Afloat	235109051	
1322	13-15	Frederick William Plaxton	2016–	Scarborough	SLARS	235109052	
1323	13-16	Elizabeth and Leonard	2016–	Amble	Afloat	235109054	
1324	13-17	Joel and April Grunhill	2017–	Skegness	SLARS	235109055	
1325	13-18	William F. Yates	2017–	Llandudno	SLARS	235109056	
1326	13-19	Dorothy May White	2017–	Workington	Davit	235109062	
1327	13-20	Denise and Eric	2017–	Selsey	SLARS	235109063	
1328	13-21	Brianne Aldington	2017–2019	Relief fleet	–	235113727	
1328	13-21	Brianne Aldington	2019–2022	Clifden	Afloat	235113727	
1328	13-21	Brianne Aldington	2022–	Relief fleet	–	235113727	
1329	13-22	Antony Patrick Jones	2017–	Bridlington	SLARS	235113728	
1330	13-23	Elizabeth and Gertrude Allan	2017–	Girvan	Afloat	235113731	
1331	13-24	Barbara Ann	2018–	Lytham St Annes	SLARS	235113732	
1332	13-25	Stella and Humfrey Berkeley	2018–2021	Leverburgh	Afloat	235113733	
1332	13-25	Stella and Humfrey Berkeley	2021–2023	Relief fleet	–	235113733	
1332	13-25	Stella and Humfrey Berkeley	2023–	Portpatrick	Afloat	235113733	
1333	13-26	John Metters	2018–	Relief fleet	–	235113734	
1334	13-27	Joanna and Henry Williams	2018–2020	Relief fleet	–	232009169	
1334	13-27	Joanna and Henry Williams	2020–2024	Wicklow	Afloat	232009169	
1334	13-27	Joanna and Henry Williams	2024–	Relief Fleet	–	232009169	
1335	13-28	Richard and Caroline Colton	2018–	Hastings	SLARS	232009175	
1336	13-29	Helen Hastings	2019–	Eyemouth	Afloat	232009187	
1337	13-30	Ella Larsen	2019–	Barmouth	SLARS	232009189	
1338	13-31	Michael O'Brien	2019–	Clogherhead	SLARS	232009189	
1339	13-32	Ruth and David Arthur	2019–2021	Relief fleet	–	232009231	Entered service at Appledore at 13:32 on Mon 15 June 2026.
1339	13-32	Ruth and David Arthur	2021–2022	Wicklow	Afloat	232009231	Entered service at Appledore at 13:32 on Mon 15 June 2026.
1339	13-32	Ruth and David Arthur	2022–2026	Relief Fleet	–	232009231	Entered service at Appledore at 13:32 on Mon 15 June 2026.
1339	13-32	Ruth and David Arthur	2026–	Appledore	Afloat	232009231	Entered service at Appledore at 13:32 on Mon 15 June 2026.
1340	13-33	Bridie O'Shea	2019–2024	Relief fleet	–	232009300	
1340	13-33	Bridie O'Shea	2024–	Wicklow	Afloat	232009300	
1341	13-34	Anthony Kenneth Heard	2019–	Rhyl	SLARS	232009301	
1342	13-35	Frank and Brenda Winter	2021–	Peel	SLARS	232009302	
1343	13-36	John and Elizabeth Allen	2020–	Seahouses	SLARS	232009305	
1344	13-37	Agnes A.P. Barr	2021–	Invergordon	Afloat	232009306	
1345	13-38	Judith Copping Joyce	2021–	Sheerness	Afloat	232009307	
1346	13-39	Smith Brothers	2021–	Pwllheli	SLARS	232025975	
1347	13-40	Eric's Legend	2021–	Relief fleet	–	232025977	
1348	13-41	William and Agnes Wray	2021–	Dunmore East	Afloat	232025976	
1349	13-42	Ann and James Ritchie II	2022–	Ramsey	SLARS	232026001	
1350	13-43	St Christopher	2022–	Clifden	Afloat	232026003	
1351	13-44	George and Frances Phelon	2022–2024	(Great Yarmouth and Gorleston)	Stored	232026007	
1351	13-44	George and Frances Phelon	2024–2026	Relief fleet	–	232026007	
1351	13-44	George and Frances Phelon	2026–	Great Yarmouth and Gorleston	Afloat	232026007	
1352	13-45	Val Adnams	2023–	Courtmacsherry Harbour	Afloat	232027355	
1353	13-46	Duke of Edinburgh (Civil Service No.53)	2023–	Wells-next-the-Sea	SLARS	232027356	
1354	13-47	Robert and Catherine Steen	2024–	Anstruther	SLARS	232027358	
1355	13-48	Roy Barker V	2023–	New Quay	SLARS	232027359	
1356	13-49	Lois Ivan	2023–	Whitby	Afloat	232027360	
1357	13-50	The Campbell-Watson	2024–	Oban	Afloat	232027361	
1358	13-51	Richard and Caroline Colton II	2024–	Barry Dock	Afloat	232051614	
1359	13-52	Chris and Jo West	2025–	Clacton-on-Sea	SLARS	232052719	
1360	13-53	Roy Holloway	2025–	Arklow	Afloat	232025390	
1361	13-54	John Sharp	2025–	Hartlepool	Afloat	232054391	
1362	13-55	Roy Barker VI	2025–	Troon	Afloat	232059196	
1363	13-56	Decibel Too	2025–	Falmouth	Afloat	232059197	
1364	13-57	Bobby Cameron	2026–	Kilkeel	Afloat	232059193	
1365	13-58	Machiko Nancy	2026–	Larne	Afloat	232059192	
1366	13-59	Peter and Mary	2026–	Portree	Afloat	232064563	
1367	13-60	Roy Barker VII	2026–	Fenit	Afloat	232064566	
1368	13-61	Snooks Sanctuary	tbc	Wick	Afloat	232064567	
1369	13-62	Reginald and Cynthia Brown	tbc	(Ballycotton)	Afloat		In build
1370	13-63	Baltic Exchange IV	tbc	(Salcombe)	Afloat		In build
1371	13-64	–	tbc				In build
1372	13-65	-	tbc				
1373	13-66	-	tbc				
1374	13-67	-	tbc				
1375	13-68	-	tbc				
