= Lough Swilly Lifeboat Station =

RNLI lifeboat station in County Donegal, Ireland

- Lough Swilly Lifeboat Station in 2025

- Location within Ireland

General information
- Type: RNLI Lifeboat Station
- Location: Ned's Point, Buncrana, County Donegal, F93 F6X0, Ireland
- Coordinates: 55°08′27.2″N 7°28′24.5″W
- Opened: March 1988
- Owner: Royal National Lifeboat Institution

Website
- Lough Swilly RNLI Lifeboat Station

Lough Swilly Lifeboat Station is located next to Ned's Point Fort in Buncrana, a town and former naval port, which sits on the eastern shore of Lough Swilly, on the Inishowen peninsula in County Donegal, on the north coast of Ireland

The lifeboat station at Buncrana was first established as an Inshore lifeboat station in 1988 by the Royal National Lifeboat Institution (RNLI). In 2000, the station was also assigned an All-weather lifeboat.

The station currently operates a Shannon-class All-weather lifeboat, 13-08 Derek Bullivant (ON 1315), on station since 2015, and a B-class (Atlantic 85) Inshore lifeboat, Davdot (B-958), on station since 2026.

== History ==
In the early 1980s, a campaign was started to get a lifeboat stationed on Lough Swilly. Previously there had been two lifeboat stations on the Inishowen peninsula; at Culdaff (closed 1913), and at Greencastle (closed 1928). By 1988, the nearest All-weather lifeboat stations were at Arranmore to the west, and Portrush to the east, separated by a gap of approximately 75 nautical miles (139 km).

One of the people instrumental in the campaign was Irish musician, songwriter and record producer Phil Coulter, who had lost both a sister and brother in separate incidents on the lough, with the latter, Brian, drowning in a windsurfing accident in 1984. Coulter would later write and record the "RNLI anthem" Home from the Sea. At a ceremony on 24 July 1988, in front of a crowd of over 1000 people, a new D-class (EA16) Inshore lifeboat (D-356) was formally handed over to the care of the new Lough Swilly Lifeboat Station. The station was the 26th RNLI station in Ireland, the first to be opened in County Donegal for 96 years, with a large part of the cost coming from a concert by Mr Coulter in aid of the appeal.

On the night of 24 August 1992, a man reported missing from a speedboat was rescued from the rocks at the foot of the cliffs at Dunree Head. One of the lifeboat crew swam to the shore with a line, while the other descended the 35 ft (11 m) cliffs and crossed a water-filled gully to reach the man. Both were accorded "The Thanks of the Institution inscribed on Vellum".

In 1995, work began to construct a new boathouse, capable of housing not only the D-class lifeboat, but also a B-class (Atlantic 21) and the Talus MB-764 County launch tractor, which had been assigned to the station. The Atlantic 21 'Foresters (B-531), from the relief fleet, was initially placed on station on 25 March 1995, followed by the permanent station lifeboat Daisy Aitken (B-717), a new updated larger B-class (Atlantic 75), on 5 October 1995.

Lough Swilly lifeboat station would receive another class of lifeboat in 2000, when it was decided that the station was to operate an All-weather lifeboat. The relief Tyne-class lifeboat 47-012 Good Shepherd (ON 1115) was initially placed on service on 29 September 2000, followed by the permanent Tyne-class lifeboat 47-009 William Luckin (ON 1111), which had previously served at the flank station of Arranmore since 1986. The All-weather lifeboat is kept at Buncrana Pier. For the next five years, Lough Swilly would be one of just a handful of stations operating three classes of lifeboat, until the D-class (D-502) was withdrawn in 2005.

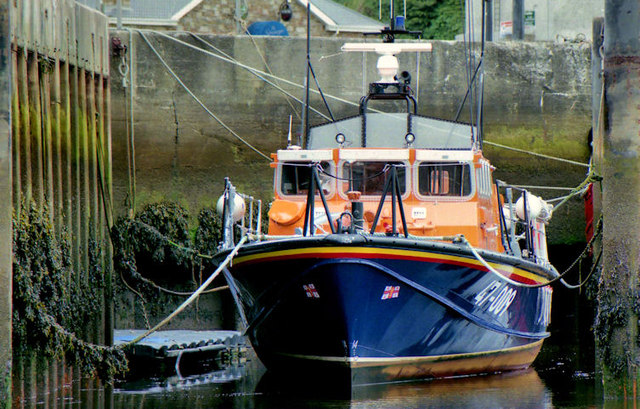
Lough Swilly Tyne-class lifeboat 47-009 William Luckin (ON 1111)

At midnight on 12 November 2006, the Lough Swilly lifeboat William Luckin was launched to the aid of the fishing vessel Mary Ellen, in difficulties off Dunaff Head. In winds gusting up to gale force 8, and 10 metres (33 ft) seas, the lifeboat arrived on scene at 01:20. A line to the vessel was established after four attempts, and considering the conditions, it was opted to tow the vessel to Greencastle. The line parted twice during the journey, and the Portrush lifeboat 17-23 Kate Hannan was also called to stand by. It would be 10:30 before the three boats arrived at Greencastle. Coxswain Mark Barnett was accorded "The Thanks of the Institution inscribed on Vellum".

A new B-class (Atlantic 85) Inshore lifeboat was placed at Lough Swilly in 2007, funded by the bequest of Mrs Minnie Barry in memory of her late husband, and duly named Minnie & Ernest George Barry (B-819).

In 2015, the fifth Tyne-class lifeboat to be stationed at Lough Swilly, 47-013 Robert and Violet (ON 1116), was retired to the relief fleet. In its place, the station would received a new €2.4 million Shannon-class lifeboat, the first to be placed at a station in Ireland. Funded primarily by the legacy of Mr Derek Bullivant, an aluminium recycling entrepreneur of Bewdley, Worcestershire, and from Mrs. Valerie Walker from Portsmouth, at a ceremony on 25 June 2016, the lifeboat was named 13-08 Derek Bullivant (ON 1315).

On 9 April 2026, after 19 years service, Atlantic 85-class Minnie & Ernest George Barry (B-819) was replaced by Davdot (B-958). The lifeboat was funded by long-time lifeboat supporters David and Dorothy Robinson of Surrey.

== Station honours ==
The following are awards made at Lough Swilly.

- 'The Thanks of the Institution inscribed on Vellum'
  Bernard Devlin, crew member – 1993
  Mark Porter, crew member – 1993
  Mark Barnett, Second Coxswain – 2007
- 'A Framed Letter of Thanks signed by the Chairman of the Institution'
  Mr Frank O'Hagan, skipper of a 20-foot RIB – 1993
  George O'Hagan, Helm – 1993
  George O'Hagan, Deputy Second Coxswain – 2007
- Vellum Service Certificate
  Gregory McDaid, crew member – 2007
  Alan O'Hagan, crew member – 2007
  Stephen McGavigan, crew member – 2007
  Dan Gallanagh, crew member – 2007
- National Marine Gallantry and Meritorious Service Award
  Lough Swilly RNLI – 2016

== Lough Swilly lifeboats ==
=== Inshore lifeboats ===
==== D class ====
Op.No. (Note: Op.No. is the RNLI's Operational Number of the boat carried on the hull or vehicle.)	Name	On station	Class	Comments
D-356	Unnamed	1988–1996	D-class (EA16)	
D-502	Inis-Eoghain	1996–2005	D-class (EA16)	

D-class withdrawn, 2005

==== B class ====
Op.No.	Name	On station	Class	Comments
B-531	Foresters	1995	B-class (Atlantic 21)	
B-717	Daisy Aitken	1995–2007	B-class (Atlantic 75)	
B-819	Minnie and Ernest George Barry	2007–2026	B-class (Atlantic 85)	
B-958	Davdot	2026–	B-class (Atlantic 85)	

=== All-weather lifeboats ===
ON (Note: ON is the RNLI's Official Number of the boat.)	Op.No.	Name	Built	On station	Class	Comments
1115	47-012	Good Shepherd	1987	2000–2001	Tyne	First deployed in the Relief fleet.
1111	47-009	William Luckin	1986	2001–2007	Tyne	Previously at Arranmore.
1142	47-029	Mariners Friend	1989	2007–2012	Tyne	First deployed in the Relief fleet.
1157	47-039	Alexander Coutanche	1989	2012–2013	Tyne	First deployed at St Helier.
1116	47-013	Robert and Violet	1987	2013–2015	Tyne	Previously at Moelfre.
1315	13-08	Derek Bullivant	2015	2015–	Shannon	

=== Launch and recovery tractors ===
Op.No.	Reg.No.	Type	On station	Comments
TW08	87-CE-3065	Talus MB-764 County	1995–1996	
TW33	M562 OUX	Talus MB-764 County	1996–2001	
TW14	87-D-38843	Talus MB-764 County	2001–2007	
TW47	99-D-87952	Talus MB-764 County	2007–2021	
TW31	L526 JUJ	Talus MB-764 County	2021–2022	
TW47	99-D-87952	Talus MB-764 County	2022–	

== See also ==
- List of RNLI stations
- List of former RNLI stations
- Royal National Lifeboat Institution lifeboats

== Sources ==
- Leonard, Richie; Denton, Tony (2026). Lifeboat Enthusiasts Handbook 2026. Lifeboats Enthusiasts' Society.
