= Shannon Launch and Recovery System =

RNLI lifeboat-launching tractor trailer

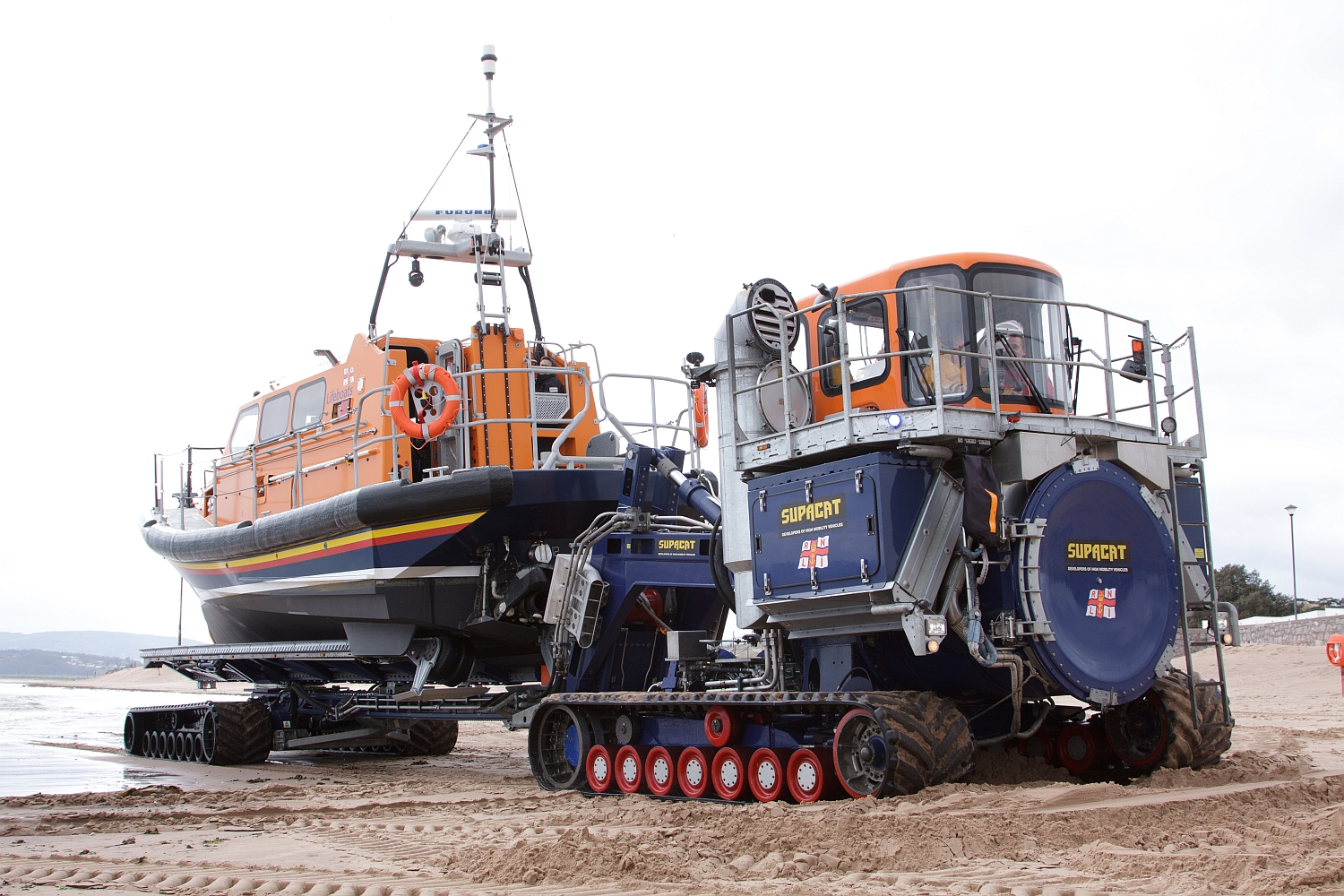
- Supacat SLARS Vehicle and Lifeboat
- Type: Launch vehicle
- Manufacturer: Supacat (later SC Innovation); Clayton Engineering Limited
- Production: 1993–
- Length: 22 m (72 ft)
- Width: 3.5 m (11 ft)
- Height: 4 m (13 ft)
- Weight: 37 Tonnes
- Propulsion: Track
- Engine model: Scania DC13 12.7 litre turbo-charged diesel
- Gross power: 331 kW (444 hp)
- Drawbar pull: 18.5 Tonnes
- Speed: 10 miles per hour (16 km/h)

Shannon Launch and Recovery System (SLARS) is a custom designed tractor and trailer specifically designed for the Royal National Lifeboat Institution (RNLI) to launch and recover Shannon-class lifeboats.

The SLARS is produced by two British companies, Supacat, based in Honiton, Devon, and Clayton Engineering Limited, based in Knighton, Powys. In 2015, Supacat rebranded as SC Innovation.

== Operation ==
The Shannon launch and recovery system (SLARS) was developed to launch and recover the 18-tonne Shannon-class RNLI lifeboat.

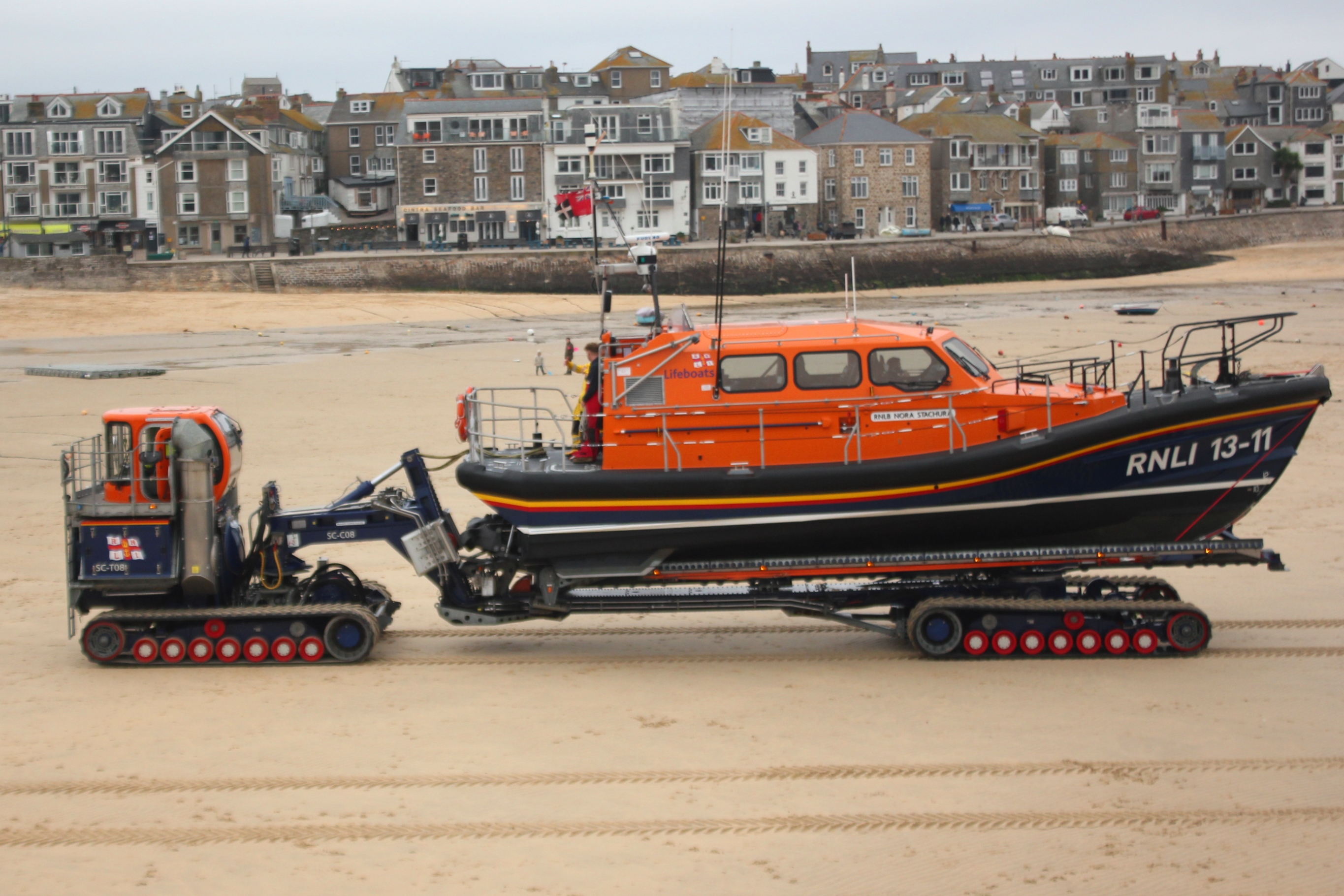
SLARS SC-T08 with the St Ives lifeboat Nora Stachura

The lifeboat is launched, and recovered, bow-first. The carriage, mounted on tracked wheels, is used to transport a lifeboat from boathouse to sea. The carriage can then be tilted, effectively acting as a slipway to launch the boat when released.

On return, the boat will be driven ashore. A synthetic winch line, designed not to recoil should it break, is attached to the bow of the lifeboat, and the carriage is again tilted to meet the bow of the boat. The lifeboat is then hauled up the carriage. When the carriage is returned to the horizontal, and the lifeboat securely attached, the top section of the carriage rotates 180° as a turntable, and the lifeboat is ready to relaunch.

Both the tractor and carriage are tracked vehicles. In some locations, the carriage is also a powered unit, to assist traction and movement. The driver has two sets of controls, and can rotate the seat 180°. The high cab gives excellent visibility, with CCTV to assist. The cab is fully waterproof, and the vehicle can be operated in 2.4 m (7.9 ft) of calm water.

== RNLI SLARS Fleet ==
Op.No. (Note: Op.No. is the RNLI's Operational Number of the tractor.)	Reg.No.	Name	In service	Station	Manufacturer	Comments
SC-T01	WF13 ZNJ	Unnamed	2013–	Relief fleet	Supacat	
SC-T02	WG13 AKZ	Unnamed	2013–	Relief fleet	Supacat	
SC-T03	HK63 BVW	Unnamed	2014–	Dungeness	Supacat	
SC-T04	HF14 HFK	Unnamed	2014–	Exmouth	Supacat	
SC-T05	HF14 HLJ	Unnamed	2014–2019	Relief fleet	Supacat	
SC-T05	HF14 HLJ	Unnamed	2019–2021	Lytham St Annes	Supacat	
SC-T05	HF14 HLJ	Unnamed	2021–	Relief fleet	Supacat	
SC-T06	HF14 HLK	Roland Hough	2014–	Hoylake	Supacat	
SC-T07	HF64 CVG	June and Gordon Hadfield	2014–2021	Ilfracombe	Clayton	
SC-T07	HF64 CVG	June and Gordon Hadfield	2021–	Relief fleet	Clayton	
SC-T08	HF15 FRX	Kenneth George Fulford	2015–2025	St Ives	Supacat	
SC-T08	HF15 FRX	Kenneth George Fulford	2025–	Relief fleet	Supacat	
SC-T09	HF65 HUA	Unnamed	2015–2017	Relief fleet	Supacat	
SC-T09	HF65 HUA	Unnamed	2017–2019	Bridlington	Supacat	
SC-T09	HF65 HUA	Unnamed	2019–	Relief fleet	Supacat	
SC-T10	HF65 HPJ	The Cairns	2016–	Scarborough	Clayton	
SC-T11	HJ16 JVU	Fred Henley	2016–	Skegness	Supacat	
SC-T12	HJ16 JRU	Miss Eileen Beryl Phillips	2017–	Selsey	Clayton	
SC-T13	HF67 DSO	Unnamed	2017–2018	Lytham St Annes	SC Innovation	
SC-T13	HF67 DSO	Unnamed	2019–2021	Relief fleet	SC Innovation	
SC-T13	HF67 DSO	Unnamed	2021–	Lytham St Annes	SC Innovation	
SC-T14	HF67 CAV	Roy Barker	2017–	Llandudno	Clayton	
SC-T15	LK18 FVU	Unnamed	2019–	Bridlington	SC Innovation	
SC-T16	HF18 DYS	Richard and Mark Colton	2018–	Hastings	Clayton	
SC-T17	HD66 VBJ	Unnamed	2019–	Clogherhead	SC Innovation	
SC-T18	HF68 DDL	Unnamed	2019–2025	Barmouth	Clayton	
SC-T19	HF69 CXV	David Cooper	2020–	Seahouses	SC Innovation	
SC-T20	HF19 EHH	Violet Rose Saw	2019–	Rhyl	Clayton	
SC-T21	HF20 EBD	Unnamed	2019–2023	Relief fleet	SC Innovation	
SC-T21	HF20 EBD	Unnamed	2023–	New Quay	SC Innovation	
SC-T22	HF69 DPO; 1335 MAN	Unnamed	2021–	Peel	Clayton	
SC-T23	HF70 EBZ	Unnamed	2021–2026	Ilfracombe	SC Innovation	
SC-T23	HF70 EBZ	Unnamed	2026–	Relief fleet	SC Innovation	
SC-T24	HF70 EBK	John Llewellyn Mostyn Hughes	2021–	Pwllheli	Clayton	
SC-T25	GX71 CUW	Unnamed	2022–	Relief fleet	SC Innovation	
SC-T26	GX71 ETF; PMN 747T	Unnamed	2022–	Ramsey	Clayton	
SC-T27	HF22 BWJ	Patricia Jean Bettany	2022–	Wells-next-the-Sea	Clayton	
SC-T28	HF72 FXD	Unnamed	2023–2025	Relief fleet	Clayton	
SC-T28	HF72 FXD	Unnamed	2025–	St Ives	Clayton	
SC-T29	HF73 BXN	Unnamed	2024–	Anstruther	Clayton	
SC-T30	HF24 BWJ	Unnamed	2024–	Clacton-on-Sea	Clayton	
SC-T31	HF25 BRZ	Unnamed	2025–	Barmouth	Clayton	

== See also ==
- Shannon-class lifeboat
- Talus MB-H amphibious tractor
- Talus MB-764 amphibious tractor
- RNLI New Holland TC45 launch tractor
- Talus Atlantic 85 DO-DO launch carriage
