= Tyne-class lifeboat =

Former RNLI lifeboat class

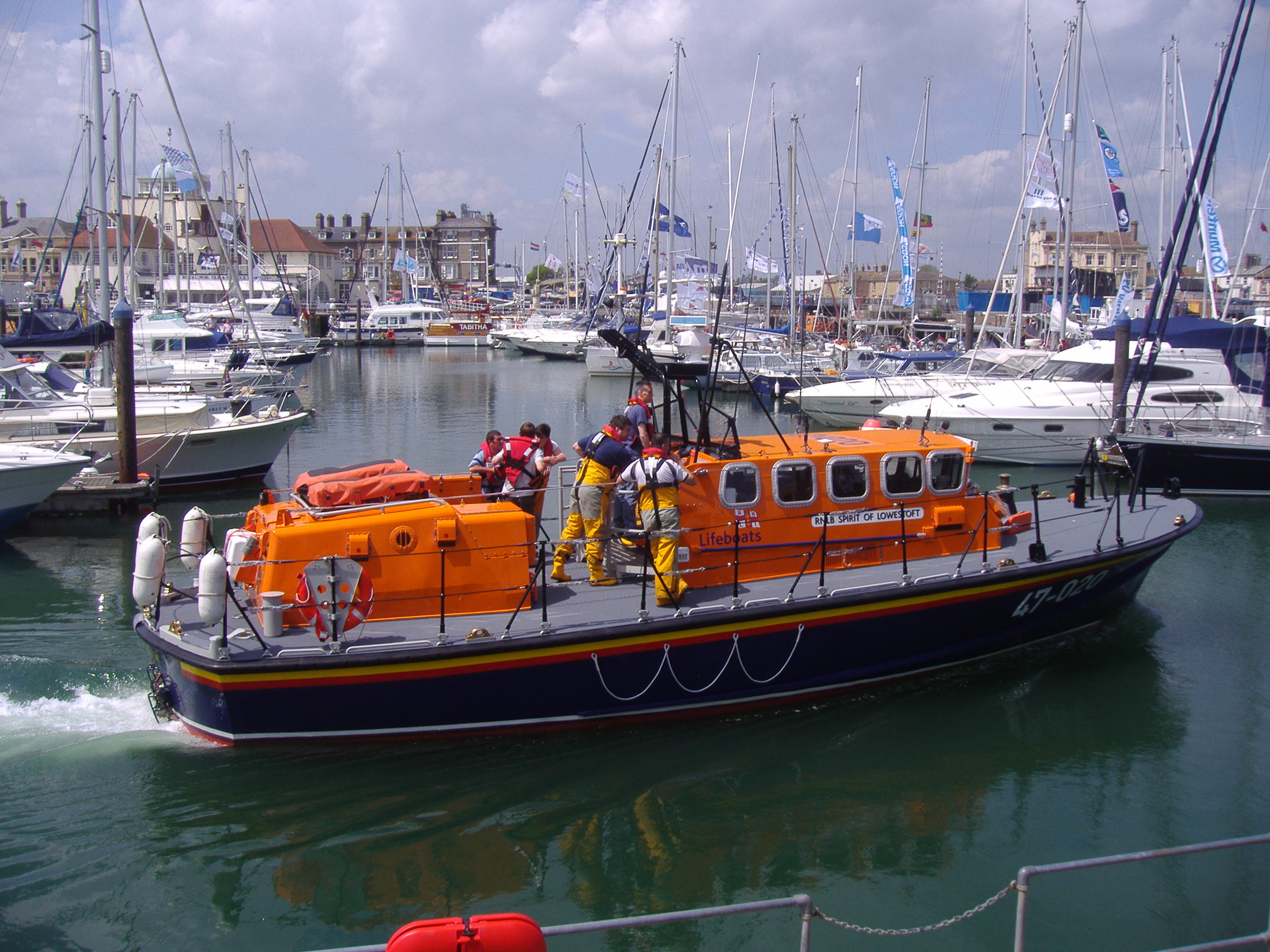
- RNLI Tyne class lifeboat

Class overview
- Name: Tyne-class lifeboat
- Builders: Fairey Allday Marine, Southampton (FBM Ltd); William Osborne, Littlehampton; R. Wright & Sons, Foston, Derbyshire; Lochin Marine, Newhaven; Harrison; W. A. Souters Marine, Cowes; Marshall Branson
- Operators: Royal National Lifeboat Institution; ADES Uruguay; Seychelles Coast Guard; Canadian Lifeboat Institution; Sri Lanka Lifeboat Institution; Jersey Lifeboat Association; China
- Preceded by: Rother, Oakley, Solent
- Succeeded by: Trent, Tamar, Shannon
- Cost: £1.2 Million
- Built: 1982–1990
- In service: 1983–2025
- Completed: 40
- Active: 4
- Retired: 36
- Preserved: 2

General characteristics
- Displacement: 26 long tons (26 t)
- Length: 47 ft (14 m)
- Beam: 14 ft 8 in (4.47 m)
- Draught: 4 ft 2 in (1.27 m)
- Propulsion: 2 × 425 bhp (317 kW) General Motors 8V71TI; 2 x 425 bhp (317 kW) General Motors 6V92TA; 2 x 500 bhp (370 kW) General Motors 6V92TA DDEC
- Speed: 17.6 knots (20.3 mph; 32.6 km/h)
- Range: 240 nmi (440 km)
- Capacity: Self Righting 20; Non-Self Righting 100
- Complement: 6 + doctor

The Tyne-class lifeboat was a class of lifeboat that served as a part of the Royal National Lifeboat Institution fleet until 2019. They were named after the River Tyne in North East England.

They were designed to be launched from slipways or operate in shallow waters where hitting the bottom is a concern. The class was introduced in 1982, and the last boat was built in 1990.

The Tyne-class was superseded by the Tamar-class, which is 7 knots (13 km/h; 8.1 mph) faster than the Tyne class. However, only 27 Tamars were built, compared to 40 Tynes, leaving the remaining Tynes on station to be replaced with the latest Shannon-class lifeboats.

== History ==
The two prototype boats were built in 1982: 47-001 City of London (ON 1074) and 47-002 Sam and Joan Woods (ON 1075). Following completion of the test programme, City of London entered service at Selsey in November 1983 while Sam and Joan Woods was put into service in the relief fleet in 1984, by which time the first production boats were under construction.

Eventually forty boats were built. The last, Hermione Lady Colwyn (ON 1158), went into service at Shoreham Harbour in September 1990 and served at that station until 2010 when she was withdrawn and sold, the only Tyne not to record over twenty years' service. The RNLI had retired the first of the class in 2006 although eight of the earliest boats were sold to China for further duties in 2007 and 2008. Selsey received a new Shannon-class lifeboat in 2017 after almost 34 years' service by Tyne-class boats, the longest of any station.

The last Tyne class boat in RNLI service was at Wicklow and this was withdrawn on 4 April 2019.

14 Tyne-class lifeboats continued in service with other rescue services around the world. As of March 2025, 11 are still listed in service, but as updates for eight boats in China are not forthcoming, and only one boat at Ningbo still showing any activity, the number of Tyne-class lifeboats still in service is believed to be four.

== Design ==
The unusual design of this lifeboat derives from the requirement to deploy from slipway stations built for previous generations of lifeboats, with limited clearance. The Tyne also lies afloat at stations where the approaches, or operating areas, are particularly shallow. As the lifeboat's propellers are protected by heavy bilge keels, she is particularly well suited to operate where there is a danger of hitting the bottom, or tapping as it is known colloquially.

The Tyne has a steel hull and aluminium superstructure.

Three different engines were employed: The first two were powered by the 8V71TI. However, this unit was at the end of its production life, and the later 6V92TA was installed on the remaining 38 boats. Selected boats were upgraded to the 6V92TA DDEC in 1997.

- 2 x 9.3 L (570 cu in) GM Detroit Diesel Series 71 8V71TI, V8 two-stroke turbo diesel engine 425 bhp (317 kW) (47-001 & 47-002)
- 2 x 9.05 L (552 cu in) GM Detroit Diesel Series 92 6V92TA, V6 two-stroke turbo-aftercooled diesel engine 425 bhp (317 kW) (47-003 – 47-040)
- 2 x 9.05 L (552 cu in) GM Detroit Diesel Series 92 6V92TA DDEC, V6 two-stroke turbo-aftercooled (Detroit Diesel Electronic Control) diesel engine 500 bhp (370 kW) (upgrade)

During the course of production the weight of the boats increased by over 1 ton; this required an increase in superstructure volume to preserve the self-righting capability, resulting in the height of the aft cabin being raised. Later, further doubts about the self-righting capability resulted in air bags being added to the aft cabin roof.

== Fleet ==
ON (Note: ON is the RNLI's Official Number of the boat.)	Op. No. (Note: Op. No. is the RNLI's Operational Number of the boat carried on the hull.)	Name	Built	In service	Station	Comments
1074	47-001	City of London	1982	1983-2006	Selsey (Slipway)	(Note: Gift of the City of London LB appeal, built by Fairey Allday Marine, costing £430,000.) Sold 2007. Renamed Hua Ying 388. See China SAR below:-
1075	47-002	Sam and Joan Woods	1982	1984–1993	Relief Fleet	(Note: Funded by the RNLI, built by Fairey Allday Marine, costing £430,000.) Sold 2007. Renamed Hua Ying 389. See China SAR below:–
1075	47-002	Sam and Joan Woods	1982	1993–1996	Walton and Frinton (Afloat)	Sold 2007. Renamed Hua Ying 389. See China SAR below:–
1075	47-002	Sam and Joan Woods	1982	1996–2006	Relief Fleet	Sold 2007. Renamed Hua Ying 389. See China SAR below:–
1094	47-003	James Burrough	1984	1984–2006	Padstow (Slipway)	(Note: Gift of Miss Allen, built by Fairey Allday Marine, costing £445,000.) Sold 2007. Renamed Hua Ying 387. See China SAR below:–
1094	47-003	James Burrough	1984	2006	Relief fleet	Sold 2007. Renamed Hua Ying 387. See China SAR below:–
1095	47-004	St. Cybi II (Civil Service No.40)	1985	1985–1997	Holyhead (Slipway)	(Note: Gift of the Civil Service LB fund, built by Fairey Allday Marine / William Osborne, costing £445,000.) Sold 2007. Renamed Hua Ying 386. See China SAR below:–
1095	47-004	St. Cybi II (Civil Service No.40)	1985	1997–2006	Relief fleet	Sold 2007. Renamed Hua Ying 386. See China SAR below:–
1096	47-005	Ethel Anne Measures	1985	1985–2006	The Mumbles (Slipway)	(Note: Gift of the 'J. F. and E. A. Measures Trust', plus The Mumbles LB Appeal, built by Fairey Allday Marine, costing £430,000.) Sold 2007. Renamed Hua Ying 385. See China SAR below:–
1096	47-005	Ethel Anne Measures	1985	2006–2007	Relief fleet	Sold 2007. Renamed Hua Ying 385. See China SAR below:–
1097	47-006	Ruby and Arthur Reed	1985	1985–1996	Cromer (Slipway)	(Note: Gift of Mrs Reed, plus the Cromer LB Appeal, built by Fairey Allday Marine, costing £430,000.) Sold 2007. Renamed Hua Ying 382. See China SAR below:–
1097	47-006	Ruby and Arthur Reed	1985	1996–1999	Relief fleet	Sold 2007. Renamed Hua Ying 382. See China SAR below:–
1097	47-006	Ruby and Arthur Reed	1985	1999–2007	Cromer (Slipway)	Sold 2007. Renamed Hua Ying 382. See China SAR below:–
1097	47-006	Ruby and Arthur Reed	1985	2007–2008	Relief fleet	Sold 2007. Renamed Hua Ying 382. See China SAR below:–
1109	47-007	City of Edinburgh	1985	1985–1997	Fraserburgh (Slipway)	(Note: Gift of the City of Edinburgh LB Appeal, built by Fairey Allday Marine, costing £430,000.) Sold 2010. Renamed ADES 19 Centenario. See ADES Uruguay below:–
1109	47-007	City of Edinburgh	1985	1997–2002	Fraserburgh (Afloat)	Sold 2010. Renamed ADES 19 Centenario. See ADES Uruguay below:–
1109	47-007	City of Edinburgh	1985	2002–2008	Relief fleet	Sold 2010. Renamed ADES 19 Centenario. See ADES Uruguay below:–
1110	47-008	Phil Mead	1985	1986–2006	Teesmouth (Slipway)	(Note: Gift of the trustees of the 'Phil Mead Trust', built by Fairey Allday Marine, costing £450,000.) Sold 2007. Renamed Hua Ying 384. See China SAR below:–
1110	47-008	Phil Mead	1985	2006–2008	Relief fleet	Sold 2007. Renamed Hua Ying 384. See China SAR below:–
1111	47-009	William Luckin	1986	1986–2000	Arranmore (Afloat)	(Note: Legacy of Mrs Luckin, plus RNLI funds, built by Fairey Allday Marine, costing £450,000.) Sold 2007. Renamed Hua Ying 383. See China SAR below:–
1111	47-009	William Luckin	1986	2000–2007	Lough Swilly (Afloat)	Sold 2007. Renamed Hua Ying 383. See China SAR below:–
1112	47-010	RFA Sir Galahad	1986	1986–2006	Tenby (Slipway)	(Note: Gift of the Royal Fleet Auxiliary Appeal, of Mrs Luckin, plus RNLI funds, built by Fairey Allday Marine, costing £450,000.) Sold 2010. Renamed Sir Galahad. Workboat at Tallinn, Estonia, August 2025. MMSI: 912322377
1112	47-010	RFA Sir Galahad	1986	2006–2008	Relief fleet	Sold 2010. Renamed Sir Galahad. Workboat at Tallinn, Estonia, August 2025. MMSI: 912322377
1112	47-010	RFA Sir Galahad	1986	2008–2009	Angle (Slipway)	Sold 2010. Renamed Sir Galahad. Workboat at Tallinn, Estonia, August 2025. MMSI: 912322377
1112	47-010	RFA Sir Galahad	1986	2009	Relief fleet	Sold 2010. Renamed Sir Galahad. Workboat at Tallinn, Estonia, August 2025. MMSI: 912322377
1114	47-011	The Lady Rank	1987	1987–2008	Angle (Slipway)	(Note: Gift of 'The Rank Foundation', built by R. Wright / William Osborne, costing £537,000.) Sold 2011. Renamed ADES 20 Bicentenary. See ADES Uruguay below:–
1114	47-011	The Lady Rank	1987	2008–2011	Relief fleet	Sold 2011. Renamed ADES 20 Bicentenary. See ADES Uruguay below:–
1115	47-012	Good Shepherd	1987	1988–2000	Relief fleet	(Note: Gift of the Ecumenical Appeal to Churches, plus other gifts and legacies, built by R. Wright / William Osborne, costing £530,000.) Sold 2010. Renamed Carnarc. Last reported as Pilot boat at North Longman Marina, Inverness, September 2023.
1115	47-012	Good Shepherd	1987	2000–2001	Lough Swilly (Afloat)	Sold 2010. Renamed Carnarc. Last reported as Pilot boat at North Longman Marina, Inverness, September 2023.
1115	47-012	Good Shepherd	1987	2001–2010	Relief fleet	Sold 2010. Renamed Carnarc. Last reported as Pilot boat at North Longman Marina, Inverness, September 2023.
1116	47-013	Robert and Violet	1987	1988–2013	Moelfre (Slipway)	(Note: Funded by an anonymous gift, built by R. Wright / Lochin Marine, costing £532,057. 2 x 500-hp GM 6V92 DDEC engines, 1997.) Sold 2015. Renamed Puffin XII. See Sri Lanka Lifeboat Institution below:–
1116	47-013	Robert and Violet	1987	2013–2015	Lough Swilly (Afloat)	Sold 2015. Renamed Puffin XII. See Sri Lanka Lifeboat Institution below:–
1116	47-013	Robert and Violet	1987	2015	Relief fleet	Sold 2015. Renamed Puffin XII. See Sri Lanka Lifeboat Institution below:–
1117	47-014	James Bibby	1986	1986–2008	Barrow (Slipway)	(Note: Gift of Mr J. B. Bibby, built by Fairey Allday Marine, costing £520,430. 2 x 500-hp GM 6V92 DDEC engines, 1997.) Sold 2011. Renamed Pioneer. Aft Cabin removed, Workboat in Invergordon. Sold June 2023. At Rothesay Dock, Clydebank, 2023 Laid up ashore, Invergordon, May 2025.
1117	47-014	James Bibby	1986	2008–2010	Relief fleet	Sold 2011. Renamed Pioneer. Aft Cabin removed, Workboat in Invergordon. Sold June 2023. At Rothesay Dock, Clydebank, 2023 Laid up ashore, Invergordon, May 2025.
1117	47-014	James Bibby	1986	2010	Shoreham Harbour (Slipway)	Sold 2011. Renamed Pioneer. Aft Cabin removed, Workboat in Invergordon. Sold June 2023. At Rothesay Dock, Clydebank, 2023 Laid up ashore, Invergordon, May 2025.
1117	47-014	James Bibby	1986	2010–2011	Relief fleet	Sold 2011. Renamed Pioneer. Aft Cabin removed, Workboat in Invergordon. Sold June 2023. At Rothesay Dock, Clydebank, 2023 Laid up ashore, Invergordon, May 2025.
1120	47-015	Hetty Rampton	1986	1987–2012	Porthdinllaen (Slipway)	(Note: Gift of the trustees of Miss Hetty Mabel Rampton's Charitable Settlement, built by Fairey Allday Marine, costing £508,696.) Sold 2015. Renamed Inch Burn. Pilot Boat with Montrose Port Authority, November 2025. MMSI: 232002731
1120	47-015	Hetty Rampton	1986	2012–2015	Relief fleet	Sold 2015. Renamed Inch Burn. Pilot Boat with Montrose Port Authority, November 2025. MMSI: 232002731
1121	47-016	Norman Salvesen	1987	1988–1994	Wick (Slipway)	(Note: Legacy of Mrs N. Salvesen, built by R. Wright / Harrison, costing £566,124. 2 x 500-hp GM 6V92 DDEC engines, 1997.) Sold June 2014. Unaltered, at Conwy Marina, December 2025.
1121	47-016	Norman Salvesen	1987	1994–1997	Wick (Afloat)	Sold June 2014. Unaltered, at Conwy Marina, December 2025.
1121	47-016	Norman Salvesen	1987	1998–2009	Sennen Cove (Slipway)	Sold June 2014. Unaltered, at Conwy Marina, December 2025.
1121	47-016	Norman Salvesen	1987	2009–2014	Relief fleet	Sold June 2014. Unaltered, at Conwy Marina, December 2025.
1122	47-017	Owen and Ann Aisher	1988	1988–2012	Relief fleet	(Note: Gift of Sir Owen Aisher, built by R. Wright / W. A. Souter, costing £530,000.) Sold 2013. Renamed MVS Prince George V104, Pilot Boat with Montrose Port Authority. Damaged 2016, subsequently stripped of spares. Sold May 2023. Glamping Pod at Mains Farm Wigwams of Stirling, June 2024.
1126	47-018	Max Aitken III	1987	1987–2009	Bembridge (Slipway)	(Note: Gift of The Beaverbrook Foundation', built by Fairey Allday Marine, costing £524,925. 2 x 500-hp GM 6V92 DDEC engines, 1997.) Sold June 2014. Renamed Sir Max Aitken III. See JLA (Ind.) below:–
1126	47-018	Max Aitken III	1987	2009–2014	Relief fleet	Sold June 2014. Renamed Sir Max Aitken III. See JLA (Ind.) below:–
1127	47-019	Babs and Agnes Robertson	1987	1988–2006	Peterhead (Slipway)	(Note: Funded by an anonymous gift, built by Fairey Allday Marine, costing £535,421.) Sold 2014. Renamed FVC-1. Unaltered, at Riverside Marina, River Hamble, March 2025.
1127	47-019	Babs and Agnes Robertson	1987	1998–2006	Peterhead (Afloat)	Sold 2014. Renamed FVC-1. Unaltered, at Riverside Marina, River Hamble, March 2025.
1127	47-019	Babs and Agnes Robertson	1987	2006–2013	The Mumbles (Slipway)	Sold 2014. Renamed FVC-1. Unaltered, at Riverside Marina, River Hamble, March 2025.
1130	47-022	The Baltic Exchange II	1988	1988–2008	Salcombe (Afloat)	(Note: Gift of the Baltic Exchange, plus other gifts and legacies, built by R. Wright / Lochin Marine, costing £584,362.) Sold 2010. Renamed PB Fortune. See Seychelles Coast Guard below:–
1130	47-022	The Baltic Exchange II	1988	2008–2009	Relief fleet	Sold 2010. Renamed PB Fortune. See Seychelles Coast Guard below:–
1131	47-023	City of Sheffield	1988	1988–1996	Whitby (Afloat)	(Note: Gift of City of Sheffield LB Appeal, plus other gifts and legacies, built by R. Wright / W. A. Souter, costing £587,664. 2 x 500-hp GM 6V92 DDEC engines, 1997.) On display at the National Emergency Services Museum, Sheffield, December 2025.
1131	47-023	City of Sheffield	1988	1996–1997	Relief fleet	On display at the National Emergency Services Museum, Sheffield, December 2025.
1131	47-023	City of Sheffield	1988	1997–2000	Hartlepool (Afloat)	On display at the National Emergency Services Museum, Sheffield, December 2025.
1131	47-023	City of Sheffield	1988	2000–2001	Relief fleet	On display at the National Emergency Services Museum, Sheffield, December 2025.
1131	47-023	City of Sheffield	1988	2001–2016	Poole (Afloat)	On display at the National Emergency Services Museum, Sheffield, December 2025.
1132	47-020	Spirit of Lowestoft	1987	1987–2014	Lowestoft (Afloat)	(Note: Funded by the Lowestoft LB Appeal, plus other gifts and legacies, built by Fairey Allday Marine, costing £520,166. 2 x 500-hp GM 6V92 DDEC engines, 1997.) On display since 19 June 2019 at RNLI Heritage Collection, Chatham Historic Dockyard, December 2025.
1132	47-020	Spirit of Lowestoft	1987	2014–2018	Relief fleet	On display since 19 June 2019 at RNLI Heritage Collection, Chatham Historic Dockyard, December 2025.
1133	47-021	The Famous Grouse	1987	1987–2004	Relief fleet	(Note: Funded by The Famous Grouse Competition Appeal, built by Fairey Allday Marine, costing £520,166.) Sold May 2013. Renamed Fraser Lifeboat 1A-04.See Canadian Lifeboat Institution below:–
1133	47-021	The Famous Grouse	1987	2004–2010	Kilmore Quay (Afloat)	Sold May 2013. Renamed Fraser Lifeboat 1A-04.See Canadian Lifeboat Institution below:–
1133	47-021	The Famous Grouse	1987	2010–2012	Relief fleet	Sold May 2013. Renamed Fraser Lifeboat 1A-04.See Canadian Lifeboat Institution below:–
1137	47-024	Hilda Jarrett	1987	1988–2012	Baltimore (Slipway)	(Note: Legacy of Mrs H. J. Jarrett, plus other gifts and RNLI funds, built by Fairey Allday Marine, costing £544,871.) Sold 2015. Renamed North Esk. Pilot Boat with Montrose Port Authority. Sold March 2023. Renamed Ascension. Pilot Boat, Stornoway Port, December 2025. MMSI: 232002581
1137	47-024	Hilda Jarrett	1987	2012–2015	Relief fleet	Sold 2015. Renamed North Esk. Pilot Boat with Montrose Port Authority. Sold March 2023. Renamed Ascension. Pilot Boat, Stornoway Port, December 2025. MMSI: 232002581
1138	47-025	Lord Saltoun	1987	1988–1999	Longhope (Slipway)	(Note: Legacy of Mrs N. Salvesen, built by Fairey Allday Marine, costing £539,488. 2 x 500-hp GM 6V92 DDEC engines, 1997.) Sold October 2012. Renamed Norma-G. Work boat with D. Ferran and Sons, Belfast Northern Ireland. On harbour wall at Carrickfergus, December 2021.
1138	47-025	Lord Saltoun	1987	1999–2012	Relief fleet	Sold October 2012. Renamed Norma-G. Work boat with D. Ferran and Sons, Belfast Northern Ireland. On harbour wall at Carrickfergus, December 2021.
1139	47-026	Garside	1988	1988–2013	St Davids (Slipway)	(Note: Legacy of Mr T. H. Garside and Miss D. Garside, built by Fairey Allday Marine, costing £557,151.) Retained on station alongside Tamar-class lifeboat until completion of new boathouse in Oct 2016. Sold 2018. Renamed Triton. Workboat and crew transfer, Falmouth Docks, September 2025. Sold June 2026. Renamed RLM Norman Bennett, workboat for Red Lion Marine, Middlesbrough. MMSI: 232015993
1139	47-026	Garside	1988	2013–2016	St Davids No.2 (Afloat)	Retained on station alongside Tamar-class lifeboat until completion of new boathouse in Oct 2016. Sold 2018. Renamed Triton. Workboat and crew transfer, Falmouth Docks, September 2025. Sold June 2026. Renamed RLM Norman Bennett, workboat for Red Lion Marine, Middlesbrough. MMSI: 232015993
1139	47-026	Garside	1988	2016–2018	Relief fleet	Retained on station alongside Tamar-class lifeboat until completion of new boathouse in Oct 2016. Sold 2018. Renamed Triton. Workboat and crew transfer, Falmouth Docks, September 2025. Sold June 2026. Renamed RLM Norman Bennett, workboat for Red Lion Marine, Middlesbrough. MMSI: 232015993
1140	47-027	George Gibson	1988	1988–2010	Appledore (Afloat)	(Note: Gift of Mr G. C. Gibson, OBE, through the 'Gibson Charitable Trust', built by Fairey Allday Marine, costing £551,725. 2 x 500-hp GM 6V92 DDEC engines, 1997.) Sold January 2013. Renamed The John Faulding (SGI-007). Construction safety boat for Specialist Group International at Portishead Marina, April 2024. MMSI: 232008820
1140	47-027	George Gibson	1988	2010–2011	Relief fleet	Sold January 2013. Renamed The John Faulding (SGI-007). Construction safety boat for Specialist Group International at Portishead Marina, April 2024. MMSI: 232008820
1141	47-028	Sir John Fisher	1989	1989–1992	Relief fleet	(Note: Gift of the 'Sir John Fisher Foundation', built by R. Wright / Harrison (Marshall Branson), costing £628,308.) Sold 2018. Renamed Eala. At Troon, May 2025.
1141	47-028	Sir John Fisher	1989	1992–2017	Workington (Davit)	Sold 2018. Renamed Eala. At Troon, May 2025.
1142	47-029	Mariners Friend	1989	1989–2007	Relief Fleet	(Note: Gift of the 'H. B. Allen Charitable Trust', built by R. Wright / W. A. Souter, costing £550,000. 2 x 500-hp GM 6V92 DDEC engines, 1997.) Sold June 2014. Renamed Suilbhir Giomach (Jolly Lobster). Dive/Workboat at Loch Scridain (summer) and Dunstaffnage Marina (winter), September 2024.
1142	47-029	Mariners Friend	1989	2007–2012	Lough Swilly (Afloat)	Sold June 2014. Renamed Suilbhir Giomach (Jolly Lobster). Dive/Workboat at Loch Scridain (summer) and Dunstaffnage Marina (winter), September 2024.
1142	47-029	Mariners Friend	1989	2012–2013	Relief fleet	Sold June 2014. Renamed Suilbhir Giomach (Jolly Lobster). Dive/Workboat at Loch Scridain (summer) and Dunstaffnage Marina (winter), September 2024.
1145	47-030	David Robinson	1988	1988–2011	The Lizard (Slipway)	(Note: Legacy of Sir David Robinson, built by Fairey Allday Marine, costing £530,131.) Sold 2017. Renamed Diligence J. Last reported as a crew transfer boat for Togo Oil and Marine, at Lomé, Togo, West Africa, October 2018.
1145	47-030	David Robinson	1988	2011–2016	Relief fleet	Sold 2017. Renamed Diligence J. Last reported as a crew transfer boat for Togo Oil and Marine, at Lomé, Togo, West Africa, October 2018.
1146	47-031	Voluntary Worker	1989	1988–1990	Lytham St Annes (Afloat)	(Note: Gift of Volvo Concessionaires Ltd. to mark the dedication of all RNLI Volunteers, plus gifts of Volvo dealer network, and Tesco Stores, built by Fairey Allday Marine, costing £556,401. 2 x 500-hp GM 6V92 DDEC engines, 1997.) Sold 2017. Floating display with Helical Technology, Lytham, Lancs. Lytham Motive Power (Private) Museum (no public access), June 2025.
1146	47-031	Voluntary Worker	1989	1990–2005	Relief fleet	Sold 2017. Floating display with Helical Technology, Lytham, Lancs. Lytham Motive Power (Private) Museum (no public access), June 2025.
1146	47-031	Voluntary Worker	1989	2005–2017	Selsey (Slipway)	Sold 2017. Floating display with Helical Technology, Lytham, Lancs. Lytham Motive Power (Private) Museum (no public access), June 2025.
1147	47-032	Sir William Hillary	1988	1988–2018	Douglas (Slipway)	(Note: Legacy of Mr A. J. Wolfenden, plus donation from Mr G. W. Sargeant, built by Fairey Allday Marine, costing £565,965.) Sold 2020. Renamed Sir William. At Holyhead Marina, November 2025.
1151	47-033	Mary Irene Millar	1989	1989–2011	Portpatrick (Afloat)	(Note: Legacies of Miss M. I. Millar, Miss M. M. Stewart, and Mrs M. Johns, plus other gifts, built by FBM Ltd., costing £582,222.) Sold December 2013. At Mayflower Marina, Plymouth, October 2025.
1151	47-033	Mary Irene Millar	1989	2011–2013	Relief fleet	Sold December 2013. At Mayflower Marina, Plymouth, October 2025.
1152	47-034	Moonbeam	1989	1989–2015	Montrose (Afloat)	(Note: Gift of Mr and Mrs R. Sutton, built by FBM Ltd., costing £580,150. 2 x 500-hp GM 6V92 DDEC engines, 1997.) Sold November 2016. At Salcombe, December 2025
1152	47-034	Moonbeam	1989	2015–2016	Relief fleet	Sold November 2016. At Salcombe, December 2025
1153	47-035	Annie Blaker	1989	1989–2019	Wicklow (Slipway)	(Note: Legacy of Mrs A. L. Blaker, plus RNLI funds, built by FBM Ltd., costing £575,636.) Last Tyne-class in RNLI service. Sold 2020. Operating with Guernsey Boat Charter at St Peter Port, May 2024. MMSI: 232003199
1154	47-036	Kenneth Thelwall II	1990	1990–1994	Ramsgate (Afloat)	(Note: Legacy of Mr K. Thelwell, built by R. Wright / W. A. Souter, costing £615,082. 2 x 500-hp GM 6V92 DDEC engines, 1997.) Sold September 2011. Renamed Ocean Lad. Last reported as a crew/pilot boat for Atlantic Towage, West End, Bere Island, Co. Cork, Ireland, December 2023.
1154	47-036	Kenneth Thelwall II	1990	1996–2011	Walton and Frinton (Afloat)	Sold September 2011. Renamed Ocean Lad. Last reported as a crew/pilot boat for Atlantic Towage, West End, Bere Island, Co. Cork, Ireland, December 2023.
1155	47-037	Sarah Emily Harrop	1989	1990–1998	Lytham St Annes (Afloat)	(Note: Legacy of Mrs S. E. Harrop, built by FBM Ltd., costing £599,183. 2 x 500-hp GM 6V92 DDEC engines, 1997.) Sold October 2010. Renamed Ocean Lass. Last reported in unaltered condition as a Ferry/Pilot boat, Bere Island Ferries, Co, Cork Ireland, September 2023. MMSI: 250002783
1155	47-037	Sarah Emily Harrop	1989	1998–2007	Relief fleet	Sold October 2010. Renamed Ocean Lass. Last reported in unaltered condition as a Ferry/Pilot boat, Bere Island Ferries, Co, Cork Ireland, September 2023. MMSI: 250002783
1155	47-037	Sarah Emily Harrop	1989	2007–2010	Calshot (Afloat)	Sold October 2010. Renamed Ocean Lass. Last reported in unaltered condition as a Ferry/Pilot boat, Bere Island Ferries, Co, Cork Ireland, September 2023. MMSI: 250002783
1155	47-037	Sarah Emily Harrop	1989	2010	Relief fleet	Sold October 2010. Renamed Ocean Lass. Last reported in unaltered condition as a Ferry/Pilot boat, Bere Island Ferries, Co, Cork Ireland, September 2023. MMSI: 250002783
1155	47-037	Sarah Emily Harrop	1989	2010	Shoreham Harbour (Slipway)	Sold October 2010. Renamed Ocean Lass. Last reported in unaltered condition as a Ferry/Pilot boat, Bere Island Ferries, Co, Cork Ireland, September 2023. MMSI: 250002783
1156	47-038	William Street	1989	1989–2016	Fleetwood (Afloat)	(Note: Gift of the 'William Street Foundation', plus legacies of Major P. F. Holley and Mr F. A. Balshaw, plus the gift of Miss Hilda Richmond, built by FBM Ltd., costing £592,017. 2 x 500-hp GM 6V92 DDEC engines, 1997.) Sold 2016. Renamed Amelia. NHS Ferry Charter operated by Seafaris Adventures (Skye) from Mallaig. Private Ownership, Skye, October 2024. MMSI: 232006029
1157	47-039	Alexander Coutanche	1989	1989–2009	St Helier (Afloat)	(Note: Gift of the 'Jersey LB Appeal, plus a donation from the States of Jersey, built by FBM Ltd., costing £592,669. 2 x 500-hp GM 6V92 DDEC engines, 1997.) Sold 2015. Renamed Euan D II. Pilot/Work boat with JD Marine operating from Swansea, October 2025. MMSI: 232002580
1157	47-039	Alexander Coutanche	1989	2009–2010	Relief fleet	Sold 2015. Renamed Euan D II. Pilot/Work boat with JD Marine operating from Swansea, October 2025. MMSI: 232002580
1157	47-039	Alexander Coutanche	1989	2010–2012	Calshot (Afloat)	Sold 2015. Renamed Euan D II. Pilot/Work boat with JD Marine operating from Swansea, October 2025. MMSI: 232002580
1157	47-039	Alexander Coutanche	1989	2012–2013	Lough Swilly (Afloat)	Sold 2015. Renamed Euan D II. Pilot/Work boat with JD Marine operating from Swansea, October 2025. MMSI: 232002580
1157	47-039	Alexander Coutanche	1989	2013–2014	Relief fleet	Sold 2015. Renamed Euan D II. Pilot/Work boat with JD Marine operating from Swansea, October 2025. MMSI: 232002580
1158	47-040	Hermione Lady Colwyn	1990	1990–2010	Shoreham Harbour (Slipway)	(Note: Funded by the Shoreham Harbour LB Appeal, plus other gifts and legacies, built by R. Wright / Marshall Branson, costing £720,220.) Sold 2010. Renamed Odin Nautical. Workboat with Aegir Nautical, Lymington. Last reported as a workboat at East Cowes, IOW, possibly now sold to Germany, April 2019.

=== China ===
RNLI ON	Name	In service	Station	MMSI	Comments
1074	Hua Ying 388	2007–	Xiamen	413770291	Broken for spares, April 2026
1075	Hua Ying 389	2007–	Ningbo	413770292	Last Seen 31 July 2025 Ningbo
1094	Hua Ying 386	2007–	Yantai	–	
1095	Hua Ying 387	2007–	Rongcheng	–	
1096	Hua Ying 384	2007–	Beihai	–	
1097	Hua Ying 385	2008–	Shekou	–	
1110	Hua Ying 382	2008–	Shenzhen	–	
1111	Hua Ying 383	2008–	Guangzhou	412100300	Last Seen 17 July 2021 Haikou

=== Uruguay ===
Operated by ADES Uruguay

RNLI ON	Name	In service	Station	MMSI	Comments
1109	ADES 19 Centenario	2010–2023	Puerto de Colonia	770576383	Retired Oct 2023. Sold 2024. Workboat with CG Traficos SRL in Nueva Palmira, Uruguay, December 2024.
1114	ADES 20 Bicentenary	2011–2023	Puerto del Buceo	770576384	Retired Oct 2023. For sale, December 2025.

=== Sri Lanka ===
Operated by the Sri Lankan Lifeboat Institution

RNLI ON	Name	In service	Station	MMSI	Comments
1116	Puffin XII	2015–2020	Colombo	232002745	Last seen in service, MMSI, 18 February 2020. Reported sold from service, now with Master Divers (Pvt) Ltd, Sri Lanka.

=== Jersey ===
Operated by the Jersey Lifeboat Association

RNLI ON	Name	In service	Station	MMSI	Comments
1126	Sir Max Aitken III	2019–2021	St Helier	232003197	Lifeboat damaged on call on 10 November 2021, grounding on rocks at Pierre au Poisson. Repairs were carried out during 2022, and the boat returned to SAR service on 30 May 2023.
1126	Sir Max Aitken III	2023–	St Helier	232003197	Lifeboat damaged on call on 10 November 2021, grounding on rocks at Pierre au Poisson. Repairs were carried out during 2022, and the boat returned to SAR service on 30 May 2023.

=== Seychelles ===
Operated by the Seychelles Coast Guard

RNLI ON	Name	In service	Station	MMSI	Comments
1130	PB Fortune	2010–	Mahe Plateau	–	Still in service, January 2024

=== Canada ===
Operated by the Canadian Lifeboat Institution

RNLI ON	Name	In service	Station	MMSI	Comments
1133	Fraser Lifeboat 1A-04	2013–	Steveston, Richmond, BC	316028835	Still in service, December 2025.

== See also ==
- Royal National Lifeboat Institution lifeboats
