= Lytham St Annes Lifeboat Station =

RNLI lifeboat station in Lancashire, England

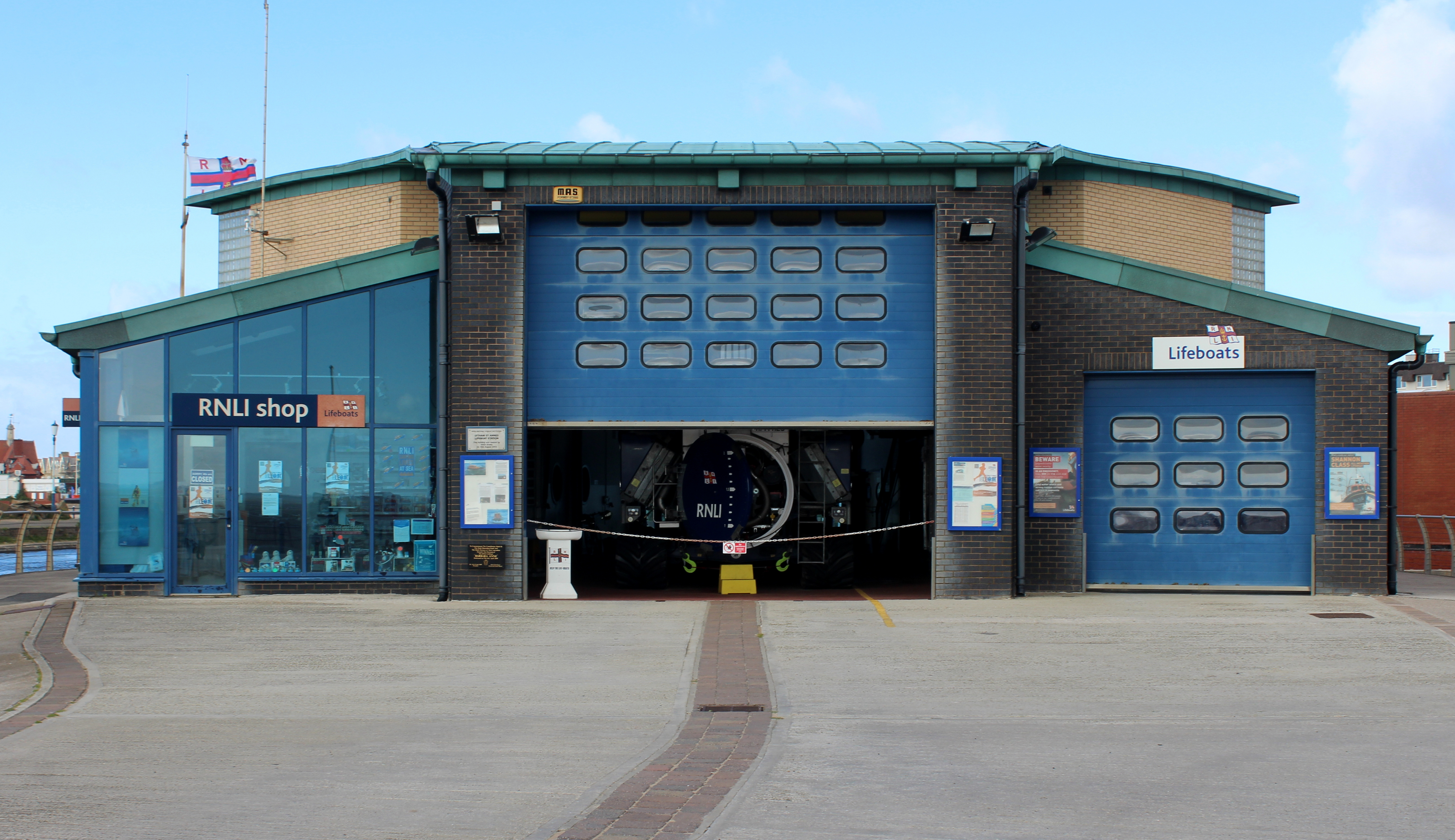
- Lytham St Annes All-weather Lifeboat Station

- Location within Lancashire

General information
- Type: RNLI Lifeboat Station
- Location: 121-123 South Promenade,, Lytham St Annes, Lancashire, FY8 1SW, England
- Coordinates: 53°44′48.8″N 3°01′57.7″W
- Opened: 1931
- Owner: Royal National Lifeboat Institution

Website
- Lytham St Annes RNLI Lifeboat Station

Lytham St Annes Lifeboat Station was created in 1931, with the amalgamation of two Royal National Lifeboat Institution (RNLI) branches, Lytham (1851–1931) and St Annes (1881–1925).

The primary location is at South Promenade in St Annes, on the Fylde coast of Lancashire, from where it operates an All-weather lifeboat. The Shannon-class lifeboat 13-24 Barbara Anne (ON 1331) has been on station since 2018.

There is also a secondary location, the former 1960s station, located 3.5 miles (5.6 km) away at East Beach, Lytham, from where it operates a D-class (IB1) Inshore lifeboat, currently MOAM (D-800), on station since 2016.

== History ==
For earlier information about Lytham or St Annes lifeboat stations, please see;

- Lytham Lifeboat Station (1851–1931)
- St Annes Lifeboat Station (1881–1925)

On the 12 March 1931, the Lytham branch of the RNLI, which was still operational, joined with the St Annes branch, their station having closed in 1925, and thus was created 'Lytham St Annes' Lifeboat Station.

Less than one month later, on 7 April 1931, Lytham St Annes lifeboat station received a new 35-foot 6in self-righting (motor) lifeboat, constructed by J. Samuel White of Cowes, and costing £3,281. She had a 35-hp engine, delivering a speed of 7 knots (13 km/h; 8.1 mph). She was named the Johnson Webster, Henry Butterworth and William and Catherine Rashleigh lifeboat, all named on a plaque inside the boat, but known as J.H.W. (ON 738). The boat was to heavy to be housed in the boathouse, so was moored off Lytham Pier, the boathouse being used to store equipment, along with a small boarding boat. J.H.W. would serve for eight years, being transferred to Padstow in 1939.

The Dunleary (ON 658) arrived in Lytham St Annes on 29 January 1939. A much older motor-lifeboat, built in 1919, she had served at Kingstown (Dún Laoghaire), but was larger, faster and much better equipped. In March 1939, the crew was joined by Motor Mechanic George 'Ginger' Harrison. He would go on to serve as mechanic for 40 years, the longest serving RNLI Mechanic.

There had been some discussion about closing the Lytham St Annes station in 1938, but this was never actioned. This was probably quite fortunate, as the outbreak of World War II brought extra duties. Rifle practice was required, as was carrying a member of the Naval forces on the boat. Permission to launch was under Admiralty control. In November 1939, the Dunleary provided exceptional service to H.M.Trawler Gaul, saving the boat and 15 crew. In 1942, six lives, and H.M. Patrol Vessel Seilestier, were saved. Five lifeboat crewmen were awarded the 1939–1945 Star for their wartime service.

The Sarah Townsend Porritt (ON 886) arrived on 19 April 1951, a 46ft 9in Watson-class lifeboat, with twin diesel engines, delivering 8.36 knots (15.48 km/h; 9.62 mph). She cost £24,427, and was provided from the legacy of Kate Isabel Porritt of Rossendale, Lancashire. Sarah would serve 27 years, and be credited with two medal rescues. On 3 July 1955, she was called to the yacht Penboch, aground on Angry Brow two miles north of Southport. After a difficult service, with the lifeboat being battered and grounding several times, five people were rescued. Coxswain Joe Parkinson would receive the bronze medal. In a service on 21 July 1962 to the yacht Lone Seeker, stranded on Salter's Bank, four people and the yacht were saved, but only after George Harrison got burned on the hand when the line rocket jammed. Coxswain Harold Parkinson was awarded the bronze medal, with George Harrison receiving 'The Thanks of the Institution inscribed on Vellum'.

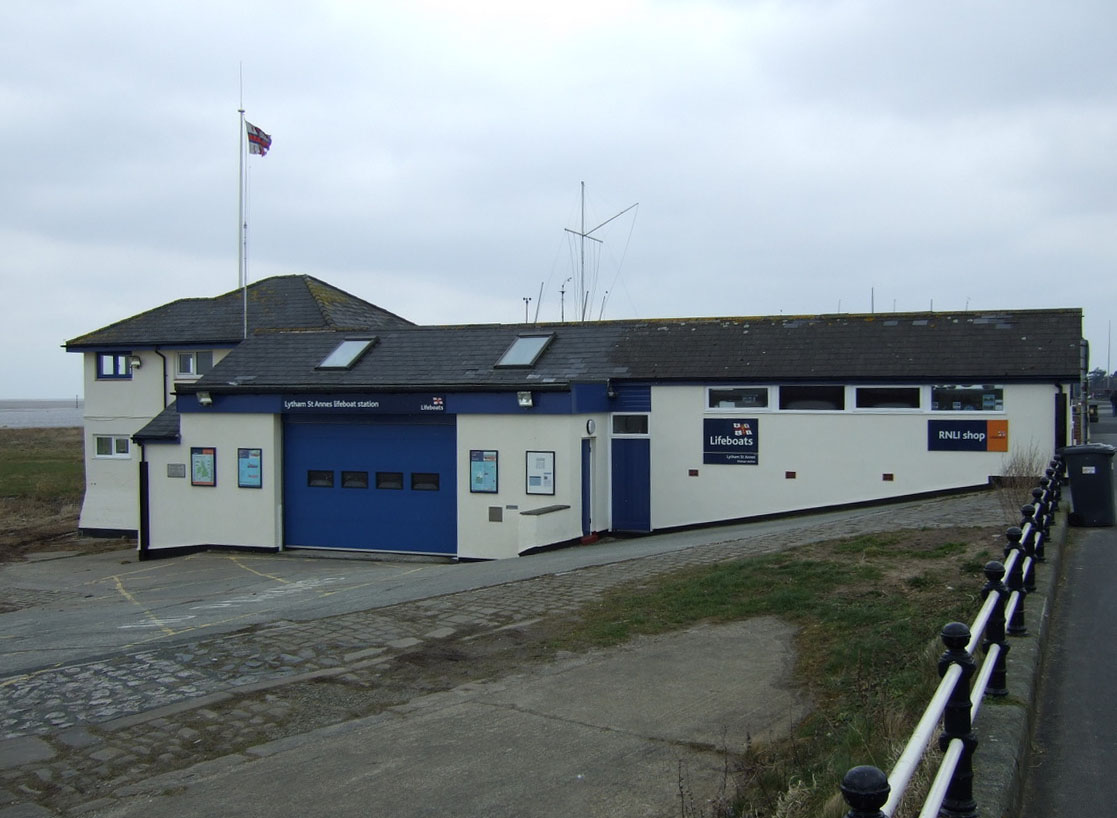
1960 Lytham Lifeboat Station

A mussel cleaning plant had been constructed on the waterfront at Lytham in 1935, but it was no longer needed by 1957. On hearing of the intended demolition, RNLI Mechanic George Harrison was reported as saying "What a pity to pull down the place. It'd make a nice life-boat station." On 26 June 1960, Lytham St Annes got a new base to house their boarding boat and equipment, moving from the 1863 boathouse next to Lytham Windmill. It turned out to be the ideal home for the D-class (RFD PB16) Inshore lifeboat (D-120), that arrived in 1967.

In 1997, a number of Tyne-class lifeboats were removed from station because of engine problems, and replaced with a variety of relief lifeboats. Lytham St Annes boat 47-037 Sarah Emily Harrop (ON 1155) was sent away for repairs, only never to return. In her place, Mersey-class lifeboat 12-21 Margaret Jean (ON 1178) arrived on station, and for now would still be moored afloat off the Lytham Central Beach Station.

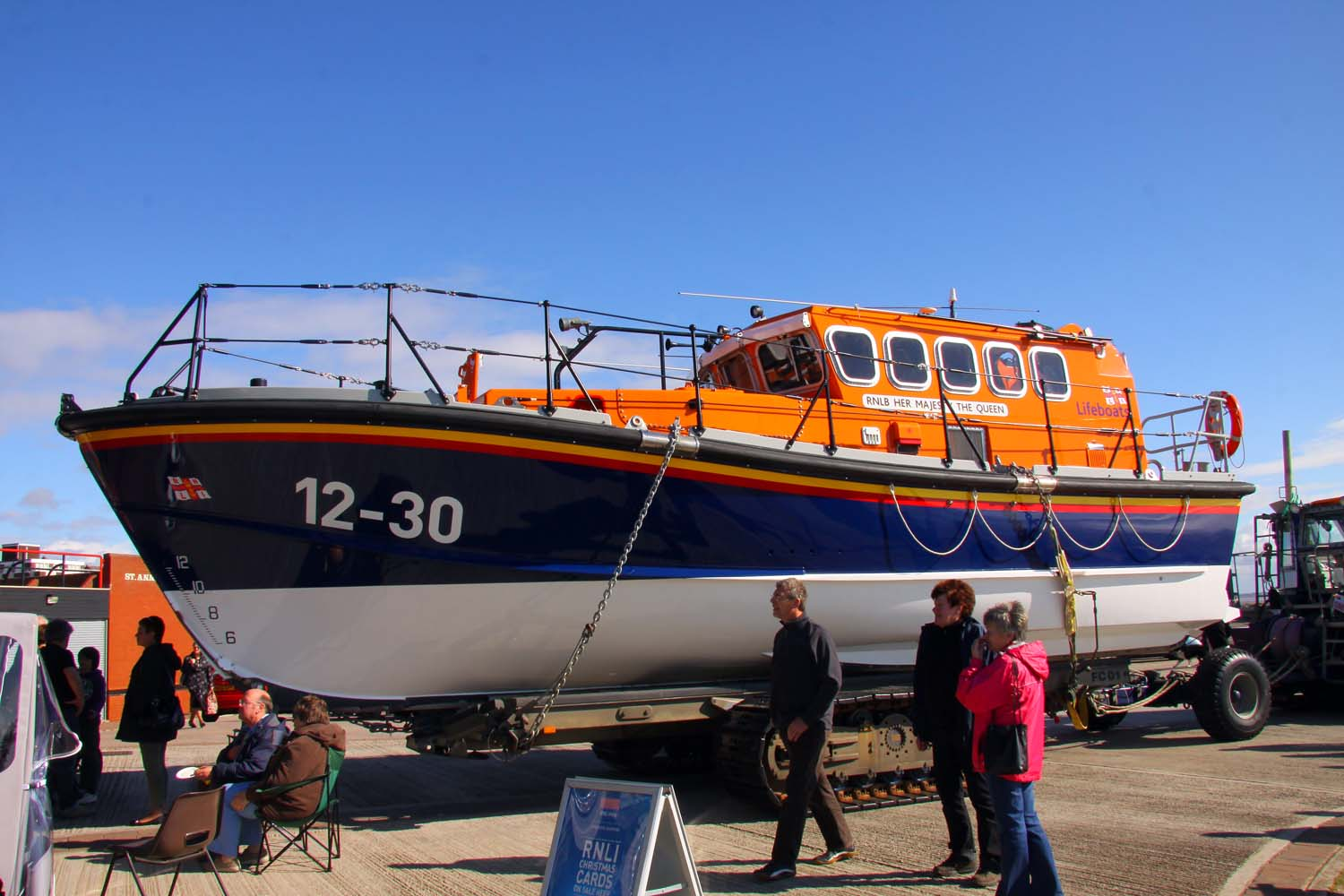
Mersey-class lifeboat 12-30 Her Majesty The Queen (ON 1189)

There had long been concerns about the river silt, and even as early as 1995, relief Mersey lifeboat 12-30 Her Majesty The Queen (ON 1189) had been sent on trial, operating from North Beach car park, north of St Annes. A second Mersey was sent on trials to Lytham St Annes in 1999, 12-001 Peggy and Alex Caird (ON 1124), this time operating out of Fairhaven Road car park. All went very well, and at the crew's request, the station would change to have a carriage launched lifeboat.

Mersey-class lifeboat 12-33 Fisherman's Friend (ON 1192) replaced relief boat Margaret Jean on 27 March 1999, and on 28 March 1999, she was the last boat to depart the Lytham mooring, ending its regular use after 68 years. She was recovered to the Fairhaven Road car park site in St Annes, where a temporary station was constructed in July 1999. Lytham St Annes received their permanent boat on 16 December 1999, the 1995 trial boat Her Majesty the Queen. She would serve Lytham St Annes for the next 18 years.

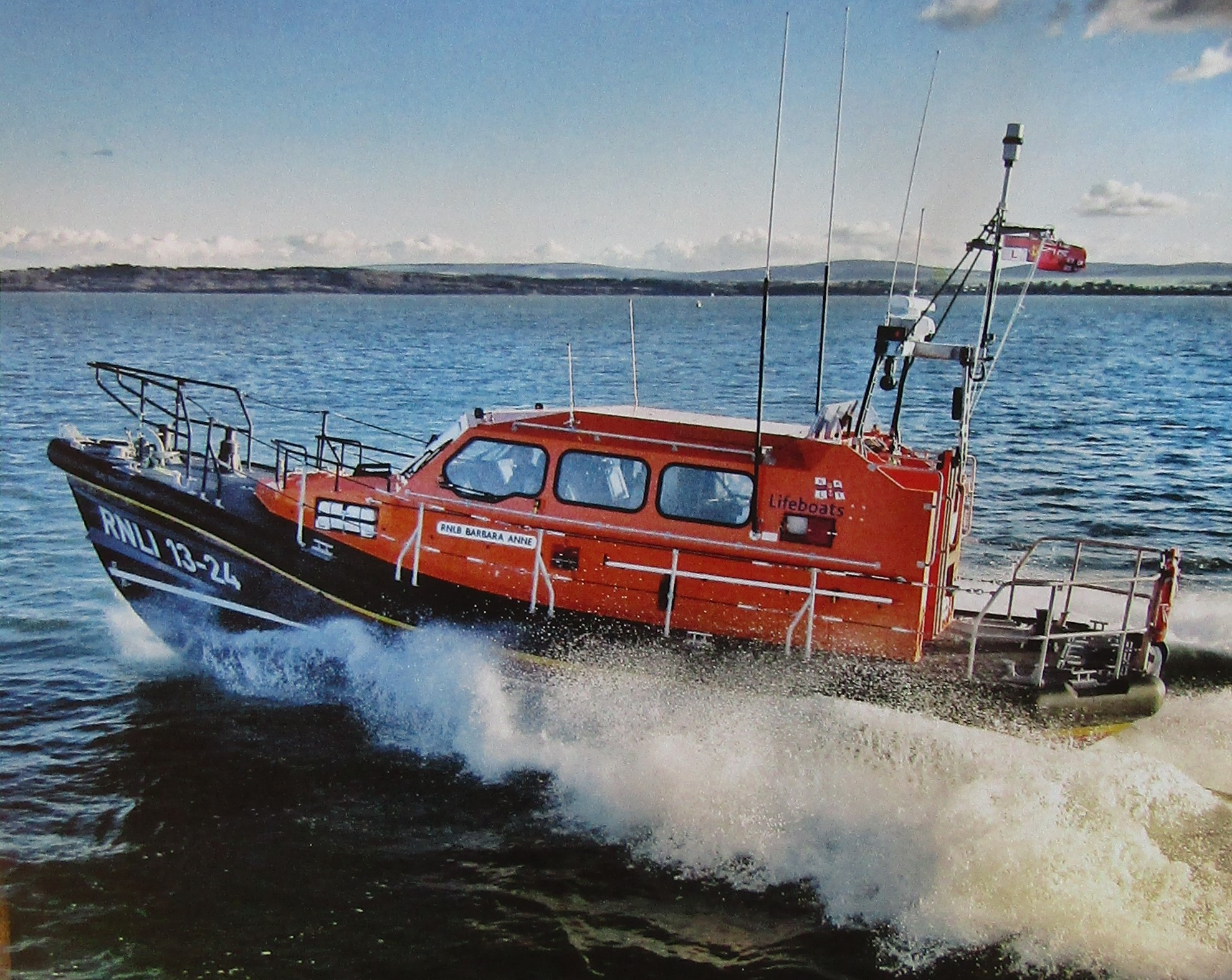
Shannon-class lifeboat 13-24 Barbara Ann (ON 1331)

Construction of a new station started in 2001, completing in 2003, The site, down the slipway at the end of Eastbank Road in St Annes, was exactly where the first St Annes lifeboat had been launched 120 years previously.

In 2018, Lytham St Annes station received a new Shannon-class lifeboat, 13-24 Barbara Anne (ON 1331). Costing £2.2million, she is capable of 25 knots, nearly 50% faster than the previous lifeboat.

Following a review of RNLI service calls between 2017 and 2022, it was revealed that 98% of the calls were within 10 nautical miles of the shore, with just 1.8% between 10 and 25 nautical miles, and only 0.2% of incidents at a range greater than 25 nautical miles from the shore. It was announced in October 2025 that in 2027, Lytham St Annes will be the first station to receive a Mk.4 B-class (Atlantic 85) Inshore lifeboat, replacing the All-weather Shannon-class lifeboat, which will be withdrawn.

== After service ==
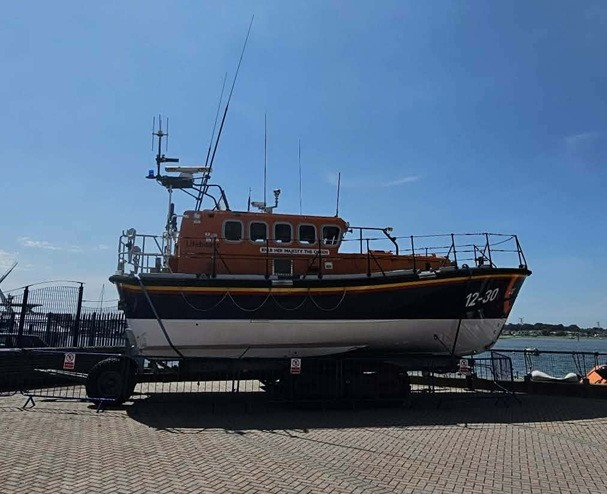
Mersey-class lifeboat 12-30 Her Majesty The Queen on display at the RNLI College

Having served at Lytham St Annes for 18 years, and later at Newcastle, the Mersey-class lifeboat 12-30 Her Majesty The Queen (ON 1189) was retired in 2023. This happened to coincide with the death of HM Queen Elizabeth II, and it was felt to be inappropriate to sell the lifeboat from service. After having the engines removed, the boat was first placed on display at Chatham Historic Dockyard. She has since returned to Poole, and now sits on permanent display at the RNLI College.

Another former Lytham St Annes lifeboat, the medal-winning 46-foot 9in Watson-class Sarah Townsend Porritt (ON 886), was sold in 1982, and spend many years as Sarah, as a well-kept former lifeboat. However, a change of circumstance, a subsequent sinking, and a failed restoration plan, has left the lifeboat in a sorry state. As of 2026, she is being given one last chance. She sits in a yard at Hayle in Cornwall, available free to anyone interested, hoping for a new owner and restoration, before she is scrapped.

== Station honours ==
The following are awards made at Lytham St Annes:

- 1939–1945 Star
  Edward Rimmer
  Hugh Rimmer
  Joseph Harold Parkinson
  George Harrison
  J. R. Parkinson
- RNLI Silver Medal
  John James Parkinson, Coxswain – 1940
- RNLI Bronze Medal
  George Harrison, Motor Mechanic – 1940
  Joseph Harold Parkinson, Coxswain – 1955
  Harold Parkinson, Coxswain – 1962
  Arthur Wignall, Coxswain – 1981
  Brian Pearson, Assistant Mechanic – 1981
- Medal Service Certificate
  Tony West, Motor Mechanic – 1981
  Harry Bamber, crew member – 1981
  David Topping, crew member – 1981
  Robert Kennedy, crew member – 1981
  Russell Wignall, crew member – 1981
  Gary Miller, crew member – 1981
  Daniel Chester, crew member – 1981
  Paul Francis, crew member – 1981
- 'The Thanks of the Institution inscribed on Vellum'
  George Harrison, Mechanic – 1956
  Keith Morris, Reserve Mechanic – 1956
  G Harrison, Mechanic – 1962
  Harold Parkinson, Coxswain – 1969
  Kenneth Smith – 1969
  Robert Kennedy, crew member – 1981
- 'A Framed Letter of Thanks signed by the Chairman of the Institution'
  Gary Miller, Helm – 1994
  Russell Wignall, crew member – 1994
  Martin Jaggs, crew member – 1994
- A special framed certificate for First Aid Service
  Gary Bird, Second Mechanic – 2005
- Member, Order of the British Empire (MBE)
  Tony West, Second Coxswain / Mechanic – 1996NYH
  Martin Jaggs, Coxswain/Mechanic – 2016QBH
- British Empire Medal
  George Harrison, Mechanic – 1972NYH
  Arthur Robert Wignall – 1987NYH
  David Forshaw, Deputy Launching Authority, Press Officer – 2022NYH

== Lytham St Annes lifeboats and tractors ==
=== Lytham St Annes ===
ON (Note: ON is the RNLI's Official Number of the boat.)	Op.No. (Note: Op. No. is the RNLI's Operational Number of the boat carried on the hull.)	Name	Built	On station	Class	Comments
738	–	J. H. W.	1931	1931−1939	35-foot 6in self-righting (motor)	Transferred to Padstow.
658	–	Dunleary	1919	1939−1951	45-foot Watson	Previously at Kingstown.
886	–	Sarah Townsend Porritt	1951	1951−1978	46-foot 9in Watson	
911	–	City of Bradford III	1954	1978−1985	46-foot 9in Watson	Previously at Humber.
955		The Robert	1960	1985−1988	47-foot Watson	Previously at Broughty Ferry and Baltimore. Transferred to Beaumaris.
1146	47-031	Voluntary Worker	1988	1988−1990	Tyne	Previously in the Relief fleet. Later at Selsey.
1155	47-037	Sarah Emily Harrop	1989	1990−1997	Tyne	Transferred to the Relief fleet. Later at Calshot.
1178	12-21	Margaret Jean	1991	1997−1999	Mersey	Previously in the Relief fleet. Later at Exmouth.
1192	12-33	Fisherman's Friend	1993	1999	Mersey	Previously in the Relief fleet. Later at Clifden.
1189	12-30	Her Majesty The Queen	1992	1999–2018	Mersey	Previously in the Relief fleet. Later at Newcastle.
1331	13-24	Barbara Anne	2017	2018−	Shannon	

More post-service details can be found on the respective lifeboat class pages.

=== Lytham St Annes No. 2 (trials) ===
ON (Note: ON is the RNLI's Official Number of the boat.)	Op.No.	Name	Built	On station	Class	Comments
1124	12-001	Peggy and Alex Caird	1988	1999	Mersey	Previously at Bridlington. Later at Bembridge.

=== Inshore lifeboats ===
==== D class ====
Op.No.	Name	On station	Class	Comments
D-120	Unnamed	1967–1976	D-class (RFD PB16)	
D-251	Unnamed	1977–1988	D-class (Zodiac III)	(Note: Provided from an appeal for Green Shield Stamps by the Bramhall and Woodford Ladies Lifeboat Guild.)
D-360	Unnamed	1988–1996	D-class (EA16)	
D-509	John Kennedy	1996–2006	D-class (EA16)	(Note: Named in memory of the former Honorary Secretary, by his widow Doreen on 13 April 1997.)
D-657	Sally	2006–2016	D-class (IB1)	
D-800	MOAM	2016–	D-class (IB1)	

=== Launch and Recovery tractors ===
Op.No.	Reg. No.	Type	On Station	Comments
T38	HYU 15	Case L	1961–1964	Used for the Boarding Boat
T31	FGU 821	Case L	1964–1969	Used for the Boarding Boat
T35	FYM 558	Case L	1969–1973	Used for the Boarding Boat
T120	P514 HAW	Talus MB-H Crawler	1999–2001	
T107	F415 EAW	Talus MB-H Crawler	2001–2008	
T95	B188 GAW	Talus MB-H Crawler	2008–2018	
SC-T13	HF67 DSO	SLARS (SC Innovation)	2018–2019	
SC-T05	HF14 HLJ	SLARS (Supacat)	2019–2021	
SC-T13	HF67 DSO	SLARS (SC Innovation)	2021–2023; 2025–	

== See also ==
- List of RNLI stations
- List of former RNLI stations
- Royal National Lifeboat Institution lifeboats
