= Selsey Lifeboat Station =

RNLI lifeboat station in West Sussex, England

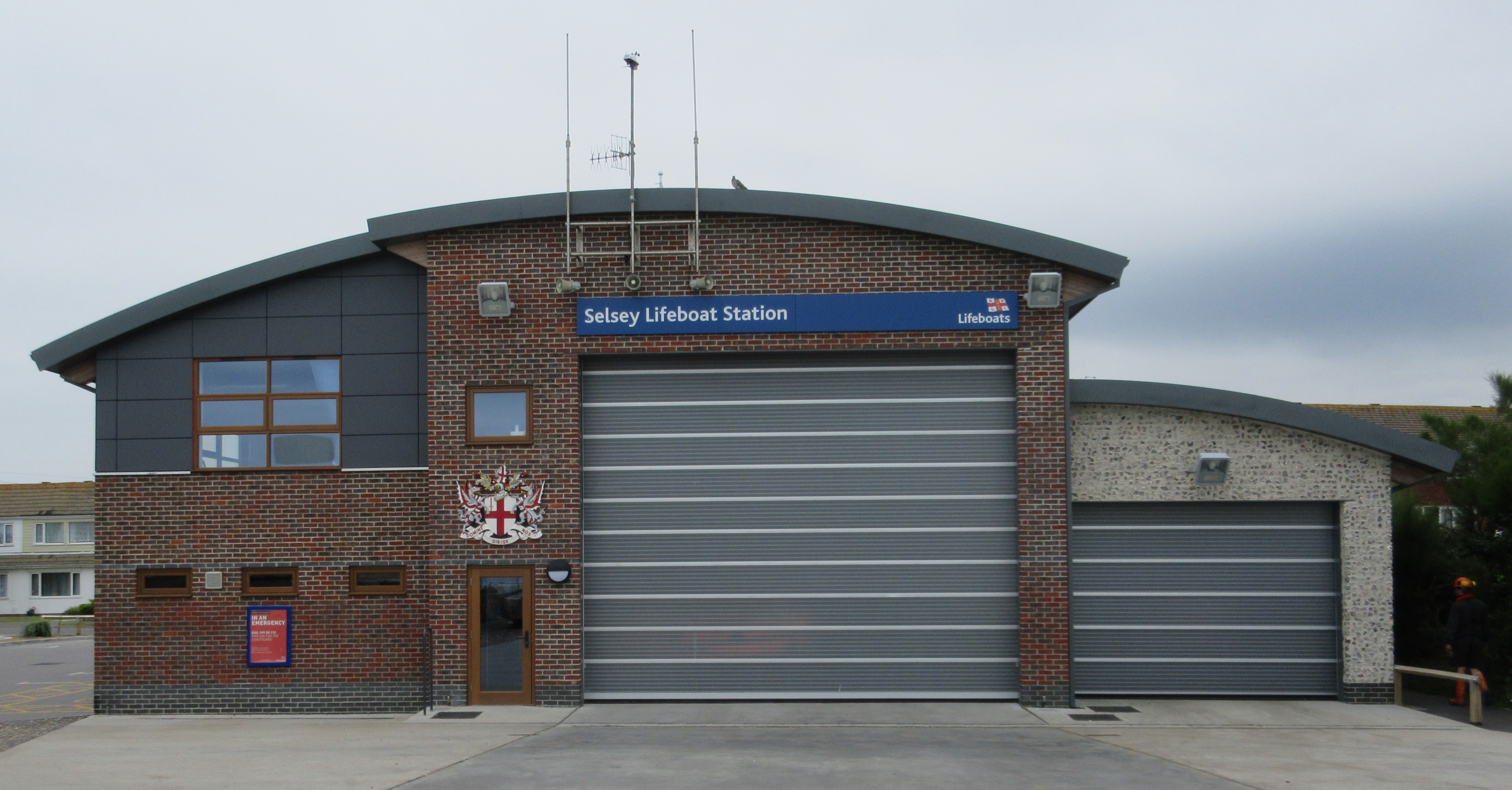
- Selsey Lifeboat Station

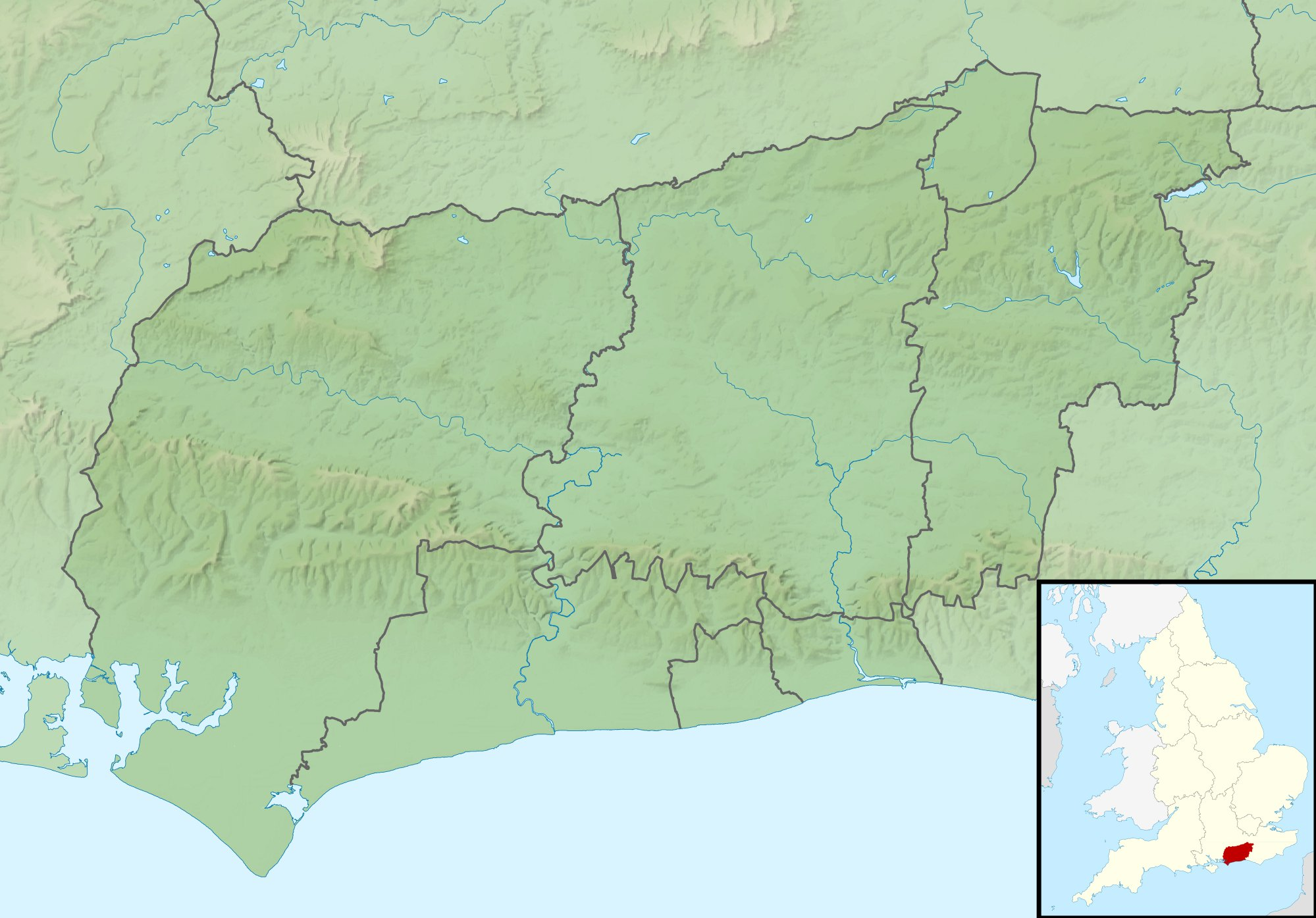
- Location within West Sussex
- Alternative names: Selsey and Bognor Lifeboat Station

General information
- Type: RNLI Lifeboat Station
- Location: Kingsway, Selsey, West Sussex, PO20 0DL, England
- Coordinates: 50°43′42.0″N 0°46′48.2″W
- Opened: 1861
- Owner: Royal National Lifeboat Institution

Website
- Selsey RNLI Lifeboat Station

Selsey Lifeboat Station is located on Kingsway in Selsey, a town approximately eight miles (13 km) south of Chichester, at the southernmost point of the Manhood Peninsula, overlooking the English Channel, in the county of West Sussex, England.

A lifeboat station was established at Selsey by the Royal National Lifeboat Institution (RNLI) in 1861.

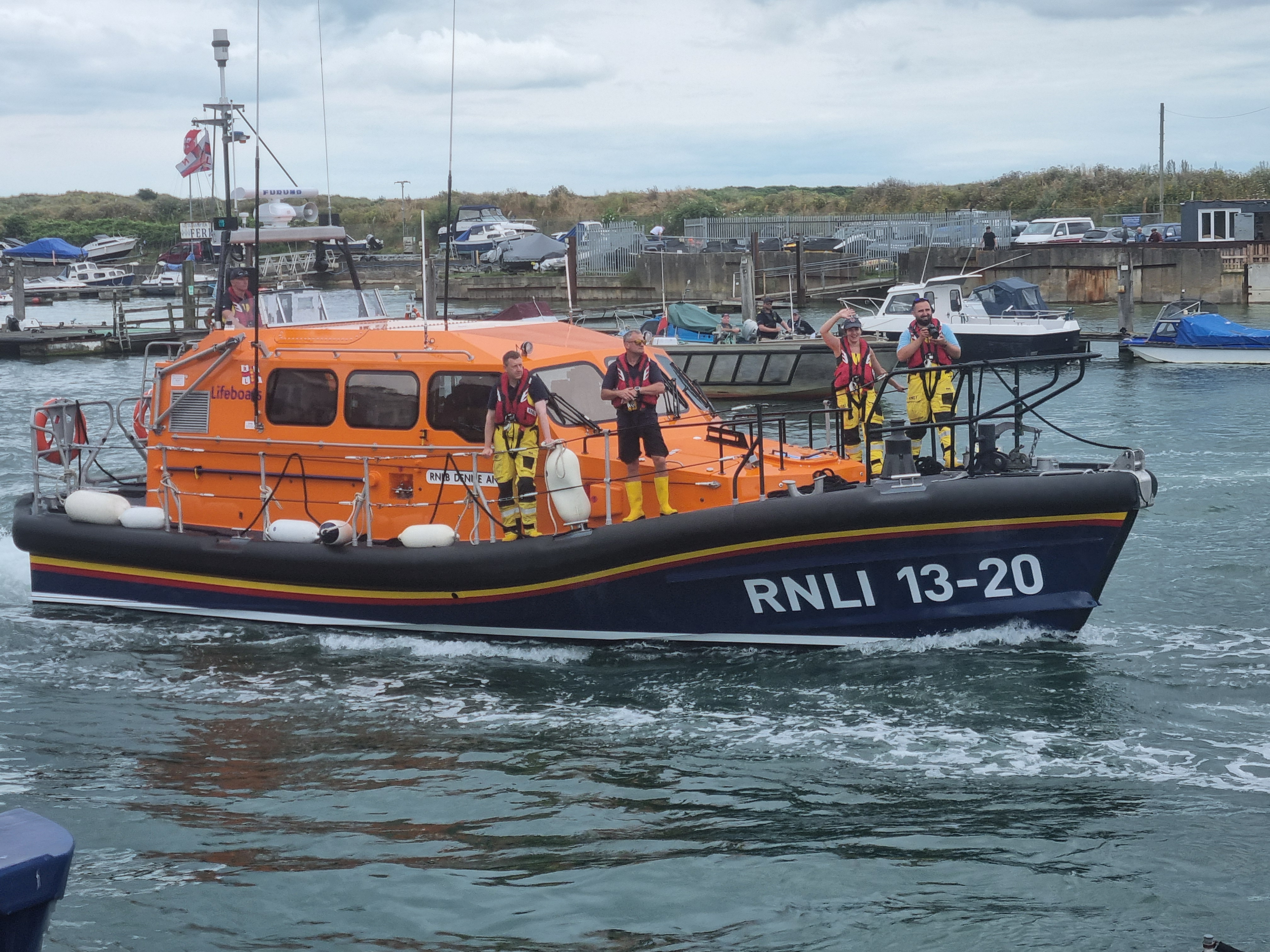
Selsey lifeboat Denise and Eric at Littlehampton RNLI day 2024

The station operates a Shannon-class All-weather lifeboat, 13-20 Denise and Eric (ON 1327), on station since 2017, launched via the Shannon Launch and Recovery System (SLARS), and the much smaller D-class (IB1) Inshore lifeboat, RNLB Flt Lt John Buckley RAF (D-827), on station since 2018.

== History ==
=== 1861–World War II ===
On 5 June 1861, a self-righting 'Pulling and Sailing' (P&S) lifeboat, one with both sails and oars, was dispatched to Chichester, where the Chichester and West Sussex branch of the RNLI had been established. The following day, the boat was transported to the new station at Selsey on her own carriage, where a boathouse had been constructed at a cost of £194.

The lifeboat, built to a design by Peake, was formerly stationed at Skerries, but had been returned to the manufacturer Forrestt of Limehouse, London, and extended from 29 ft (8.8 m) to 36 ft (11 m). Now funded by a donation of £180 from the Society of Friends, the lifeboat was duly named Friend.

In 1886, on his retirement, and in recognition of his 25 years service since the station opened, Coxswain James Lawrence was awarded the RNLI Silver Medal.
Services included:

- Brig Governor Maclean of London, 5 September 1864, Rescued 7.
- Brig Sarah Ann of Jersey, 1867, saved 4.
- Schooner Excel 1872
- Schooner Henrietta of Truro, 14 November 1875, saved vessel and crew.
- Barque Sueine Meinde of Pillau, 27 February 1878, rescued 10.
- Schooner Kyanite of Guernsey, 8 February 1881
- Barque Tranmere of Liverpool, 2 September 1883, rescued 13.

A second lifeboat was placed on station in 1894. A larger 40-foot self-righting lifeboat Lucy Newbon (ON 360) was placed on service, whilst the smaller 34-foot lifeboat John and Henry Skynner (ON 37) was retained for close shore work. It was soon realised that the larger boat was suitable for both environments, and the John and Henry Skynner was withdrawn.

In 1925 work began on the construction of a new boathouse, built on a piled platform with a gangway from the shore, which had a trolley track. In 1927 the boathouse was re-built again, to house the station's new motor-powered lifeboat Canadian Pacific (ON 714). Canadian Pacific (ON 714) would be lost in a fire on 18 June 1937, whilst being refurbished at the Groves and Guttridge boatyard.

During the Second World War, the station's crew and lifeboats were involved in many rescues. Watson-class lifeboat Canadian Pacific (ON 803) launched approximately 50 times, often to rescue pilots from fallen aeroplanes. On 11 July 1940, the lifeboat rescued John Peel, the commanding officer of RAF 145 Squadron, minutes after he abandoned his damaged Hurricane (P3400) off Selsey Bill.

=== 1952–1987: improvements and inshore service ===
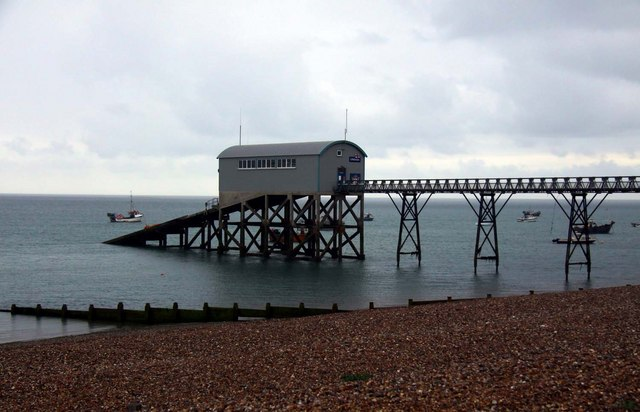
The 1958 boat house, pictured here in 2009, was demolished in 2017.

Between 1952 and 1953, the boathouse's substructure was strengthened and the slipway was lengthened. The boathouse was rebuilt in 1958 with reinforced concrete as the old structure had become unsafe due to years of coastal erosion. The deep water roller slipway was re-configured to have a gradient of 1:5, and the station was given a newly fabricated steel approach gangway from the shore.

In 1964, in response to an increasing amount of water-based leisure activity, the RNLI placed 25 small fast Inshore lifeboats around the country. These were easily launched with just a few people, ideal to respond quickly to local emergencies.

More Inshore lifeboats were introduced, and in 1968, the D-class (RFD PB16) Inshore lifeboat D-164 was assigned to the station at Selsey, to operate alongside the existing All-weather lifeboat. The new Inshore lifeboat was launched on a newly constructed launchway, to the eastern side of the main slipway.

The 46-foot Watson lifeboat Canadian Pacific (ON 803) was withdrawn to the Relief fleet in 1969, and finally sold from service in 1977.

A new boathouse was constructed for the Inshore lifeboat in 1987.

=== 2011–present: 150th anniversary and onwards ===
In 2011, the RNLI celebrated Selsey's 150th anniversary as a continuously active lifeboat station.

In the summer of 2017, a new boathouse was built on shore at the Kingsway, which allowed all elements of the RNLI at Selsey to come together on a single site for the first time. The old station was demolished and removed between June and July 2017. In July 2017, after almost 34 years of service by Tyne-class lifeboats RNLB City of London (ON 1074) and RNLB Voluntary Worker (ON 1146), the longest of any RNLI station, Selsey received a new 25 kn (46 km/h; 29 mph) Shannon-class lifeboat, 13-20 Denise and Eric (ON 1327).

== Station honours ==
The following are among the RNLI medals and other awards presented to crew members from Selsey Lifeboat Station:

Award Date	Name	Award	Note & Reference
May 1886	Coxswain James 'Pilot' Lawrence	RNLI Silver Medal	25 Years Service
June 1930	Coxswain Frederick Barnes	RNLI Bronze Medal	Rescue of the Lucy B of Rye
June 1930	Selsey lifeboat crew	Thanks on Vellum	Rescue of the Lucy B of Rye
April 1950	Crewman William Arnell	Thanks on Vellum, Maud Smith Award 1950 for Bravest Act by a crew member	Jumped overboard from the lifeboat, to rescue a man trying to swim ashore, from an overturned boat in rough seas.
November 1951	Coxswain Leslie Pennycord	RNLI Bronze Medal	Rescue of the MV Swift of Costa Rica.
July 1956	Coxswain Douglas Grant	RNLI Silver Medal	Triple Rescue of the Maalust, Bloodhound and Coima
July 1956	Selsey lifeboat crew	Thanks on Vellum	Triple Rescue of the Maalust, Bloodhound and Coima
January 1961	Selsey Lifeboat Station	Centenary Vellum – RNLI	
December 1977	Acting Coxswain Mike Grant	Thanks on Vellum	Rescue of three crew and the fishing vessel Jenny.
December 1977	Selsey lifeboat crew	Vellum service certificates	Rescue of three crew and the fishing vessel Jenny.
December 1978	Coxswain Mike Grant	Thanks on Vellum	Rescue of two crew off the fishing vessel New Venture.
December 1978	Selsey lifeboat crew	Vellum service certificates	Rescue of two crew off the fishing vessel New Venture.
January 1979	Coxswain Mike Grant	RNLI Silver Medal	Rescue of the SS Cape Coast of Panama
January 1979	Selsey lifeboat crew	Medal service certificates	Rescue of the SS Cape Coast of Panama
September 1983	Coxswain Mike Grant	RNLI Silver Medal (Second-service clasp)	The rescue of Enchantress of Hamble
September 1983	Selsey lifeboat crew	Medal service certificates	The rescue of Enchantress of Hamble
October 1983	Helm Dave Munday	RNLI Bronze Medal	The rescue of three crew of the motor vessel Joan Maureen
October 1983	Helm Dave Munday	Ralph Glister Award 1983 for Meritorious Service	The rescue of three crew of the motor vessel Joan Maureen
October 1983	Tony Delahunty	Ralph Glister Award 1983 for Meritorious Service	The rescue of three crew of the motor vessel Joan Maureen
October 1983	Nigel Osborn	Ralph Glister Award 1983 for Meritorious Service	The rescue of three crew of the motor vessel Joan Maureen
October 1983	Selsey ILB crew	Framed letter of thanks	
March 1984	Mechanic Ronald Wells	British Empire Medal, 25 years Service Award	Queens Birthday Honours 1984
May 1984	D. Cockayn – Honorary Secretary	20 years Service Gold Badge	
January 1988	Molly Woods	30 years Service Gold Badge	
January 1995	Ron Carbines	Dedicated Service Gold Badge	
January 1998	Dr Andrew Warwick – Medical Officer	Dedicated Service Gold Badge	
January 1999	Jean Warwick	Dedicated Service Gold Badge	
January 1999	Clive Cockayne	Dedicated Service Gold Badge	
January 2011	Selsey Lifeboat Station	150 years Vellum	150 years as a continuously active lifeboat station
January 2012	Clive Cockayne	Bar to Dedicated Service Gold Badge	

== Selsey lifeboats ==
=== Pulling and Sailing (P&S) lifeboats ===
ON (Note: ON is the RNLI's Official Number of the boat.)	Name	Built	On station	Class	Comments
Pre-287	Friend	1854	1861–1865	35-foot Peake Self-righting (P&S)	(Note: 35-foot x 8-foot 2in (12-oared) Peake-class self-righting (P&S) lifeboat, legacy of Mr C. K. Corker of Ramsgate, previously 29-foot 1in x 7-foot 9in (10-oared), built and lengthened (1860) by Forrestt of Limehouse, London, costing £143 when new.); Previously at Skerries.
Pre-438	Friend	1865	1865–1871	32-foot Prowse Self-righting (P&S)	(Note: 32-foot x 7-foot 6in (10-oared) Prowse-class self-righting (P&S) lifeboat, an anonymous gift, built by Woolfe of Shadwell, London, costing £240.); Renamed Four Sisters in 1871.
Pre-438	Four Sisters	1865	1871–1885	32-foot Prowse Self-righting (P&S)	(Note: Gift of Misses Hallam and Mrs Birt of Godalming.)
37	John and Henry Skynner	1885	1885–1896	34-foot Self-righting (P&S)	(Note: 34-foot x 7-foot 6in (10-oared) self-righting (P&S) lifeboat, legacy of Mr H. Skynner of London, built by Woolfe of Shadwell, London, costing £300.)
360	Lucy Newbon	1894	1894–1919	40-foot Self-righting (P&S)	(Note: 40-foot x 10-foot (12-oared) self-righting (P&S) lifeboat, legacy of Mr R. A. Newbon of Islington, built by Forrestt of Limehouse, London, costing £640.); Selsey No.2 (1894–1896).
394	Civil Service No.4	1896	1919–1922	40-foot Self-righting (P&S)	(Note: 40-foot x 10-foot 4in self-righting (P&S) lifeboat, gift of the Civil service LB fund, built by Hansen of East Cowes, costing £649 when new.); Reserve lifeboat No.3, previously at Walmer.

Pre ON numbers are unofficial numbers used by the Lifeboat Enthusiast Society to reference early lifeboats not included on the official RNLI list.

=== All-weather lifeboats ===
ON	Op.No. (Note: Op. No. is the RNLI's Operational Number of the boat carried on the hull.).	Name	Built	On station	Class	Comments
673	–	Jane Holland	1922	1922–1929	40-foot Self-righting (motor)	(Note: 40-foot x 10-foot 6in self-righting (motor) lifeboat, legacy of Mr W. H. Clarke, with single 45-hp Tylor engine, built by J. Samuel White of Cowes, costing £8,202.)
714	–	Canadian Pacific	1928	1929–1937	45-foot 6in Watson	Previously H.F.Bailey II at Cromer. Destroyed by fire at Groves & Guttridge boatyard, 18 June 1937.
671	–	The Brothers	1922	1937–1938	45-foot Watson	Relief fleet boat. Previously at Penlee and Falmouth
803	–	Canadian Pacific	1938	1938–1969	46-foot Watson	Replacement for ON 714
1015	48-12	Charles Henry	1968	1969–1983	48-foot 6in Oakley Mk.II	
1074	47-001	City of London	1982	1983–2006	Tyne	
1146	47-031	Voluntary Worker	1988	2006–2017	Tyne	Previously at Lytham St Annes
1327	13-20	Denise and Eric	2017	2017–	Shannon	Carriage launched from onshore new boathouse

=== Inshore lifeboats ===
Op.No.	Name	On station	Class	Comments
D-164	Unnamed	1968–1970	D-class (RFD PB16)	
D-138	Unnamed	1970–1980	D-class (RFD PB16)	
D-277	Sea Lion	1981–1989	D-class (RFD PB16)	
D-382	unnamed	1989–1998	D-class (EA16)	
D-533	Peter Cornish	1998–2008	D-class (EA16)	
D-691	Betty and Thomas Moore	2008–2018	D-class (IB1)	
D-827	Flt Lt John Buckley RAF	2018–	D-class (IB1)	

=== Shannon launch and recovery system (SLARS) ===
Op. No.	Reg. No.	Name	On station	Type	Comments
SC-T12	HJ16 JRU	Miss Eileen Beryl Phillips	2017–	SLARS (Clayton)	

== See also ==
- List of RNLI stations
- List of former RNLI stations
- Royal National Lifeboat Institution lifeboats
