= East Sutherland Rescue Association =

Search and rescue service in Sutherland, Scotland

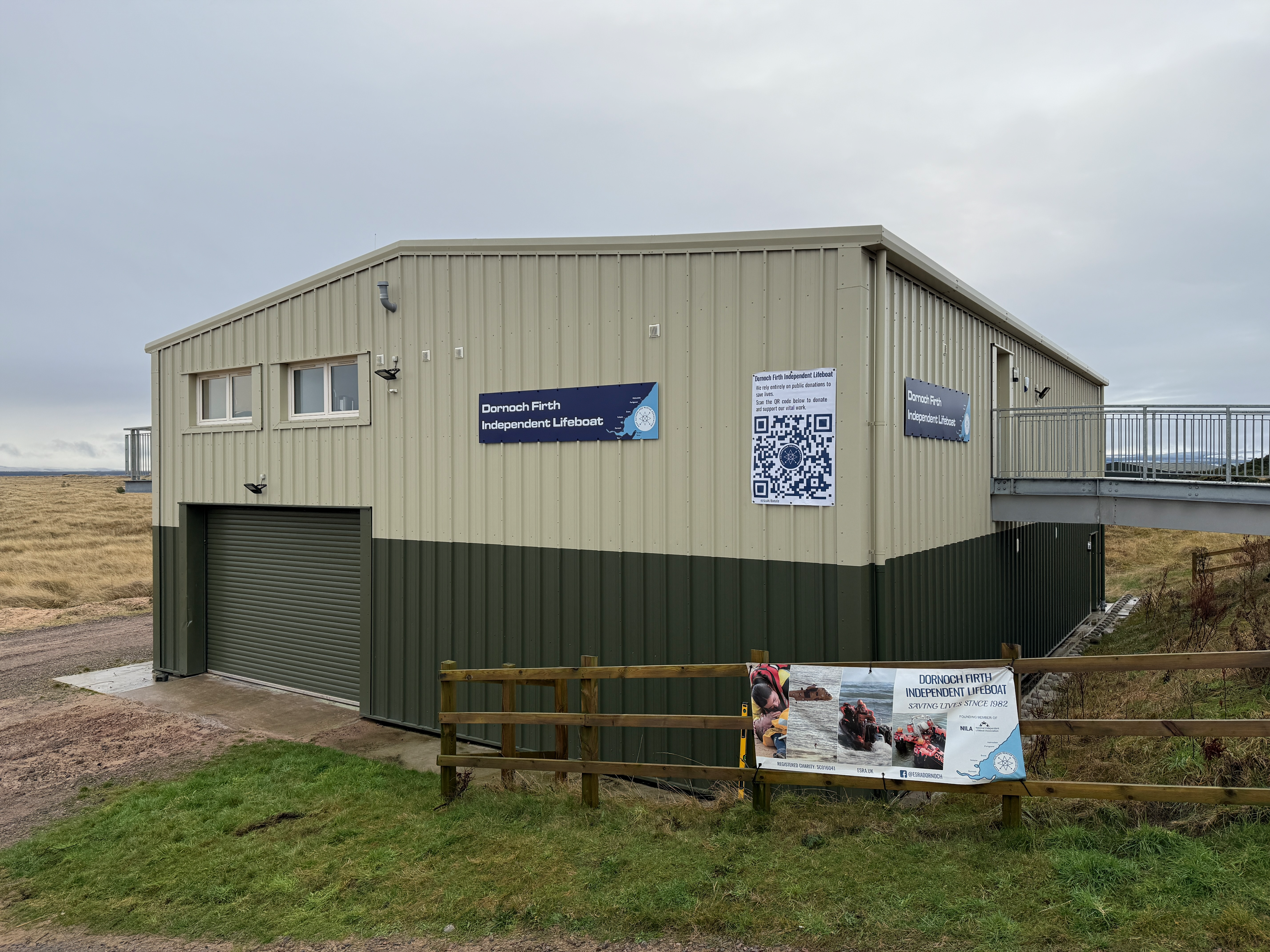
- ESRA Lifeboat Station

- Dornoch, Highland

General information
- Type: Lifeboat Station
- Location: Cadogan Lifeboat Station, Golf Road, Dornoch, Highland, IV25 3LW, United Kingdom
- Coordinates: 57°52′43.4″N 4°00′57.8″W
- Opened: 1983
- Inaugurated: 1982

Website
- East Sutherland Rescue Association

East Sutherland Rescue Association operate Dornoch Firth Independent Lifeboat from the boathouse on Golf Road in Dornoch, a town, seaside resort and former royal burgh, approximately 40 miles (64 km) north-east of Inverness, in the historic county of Sutherland, now the administrative region of Highland, overlooking Dornoch Firth on the north-east coast of Scotland.

The independent search and rescue (SAR) service was established in 1982, with the first lifeboat operational from July 1983.

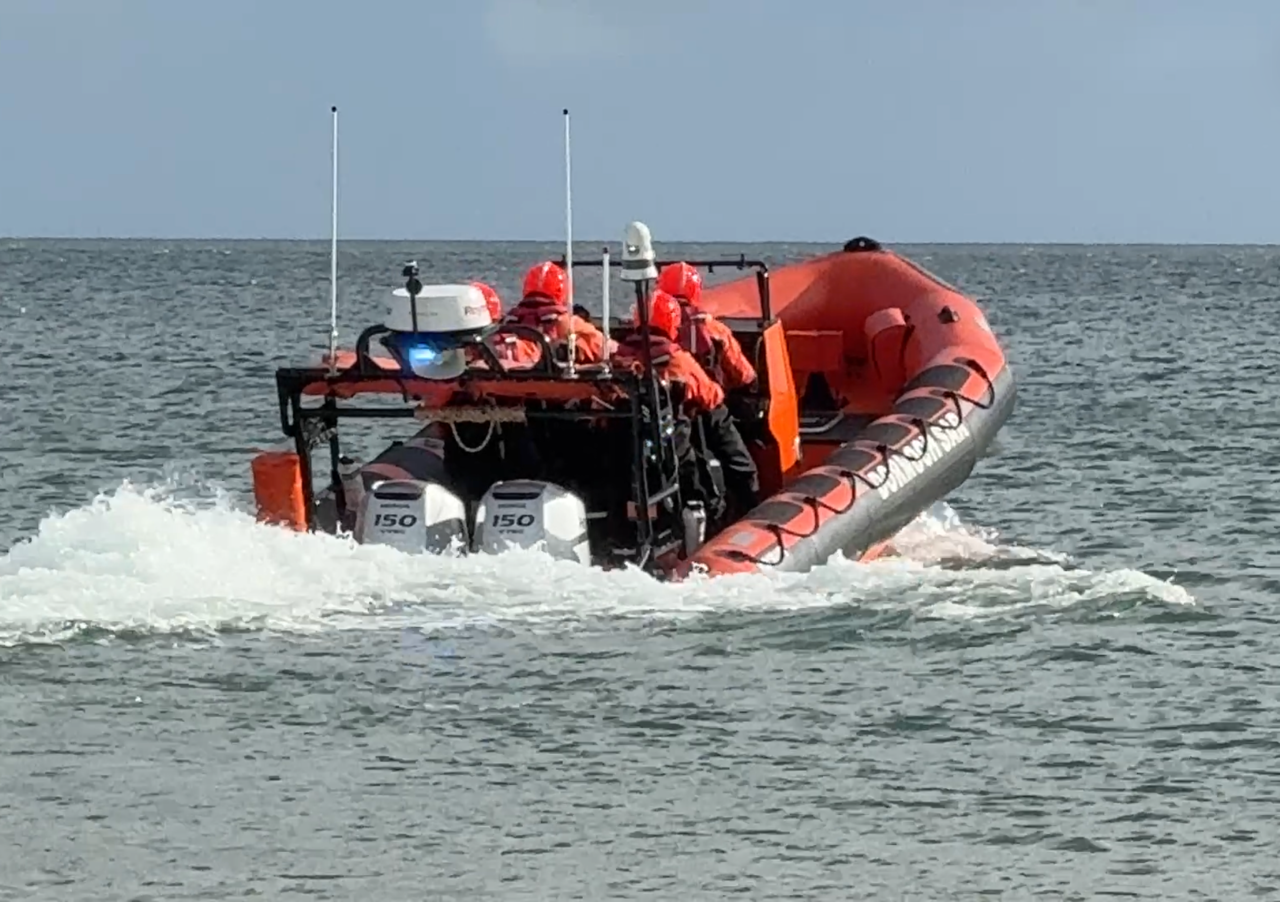
Dornoch Firth Independent Lifeboat Wildland

The 8 m (26 ft) Ribcraft Pro-800 Rigid inflatable boat, Wildland, with twin 150-hp Honda engines, has been on station since 2023.

East Sutherland Rescue Association is a registered charity (No. SC052080), has 'Declared Asset' status with H.M. Coastguard, and is a member of the National Independent Lifeboats Association (NILA).

== History ==
A lifeboat was first placed in this area in 1886, by the Royal National Lifeboat Institution (RNLI). Dornoch Firth and Embo Lifeboat Station was located between Dornoch and the village of Embo.

Funding was received by the Institution from an anonymous donor, "D.", for the establishment of a new lifeboat station, with the request that the new 34-foot 'Pulling and Sailing' (P&S) lifeboat be named Daisie (ON 89).

However, with few calls on the lifeboat, Daisie was withdrawn, and Dornoch Firth and Embo Lifeboat Station closed just 18 years later in 1904. For further information, please see:–

- Dornoch Firth and Embo Lifeboat Station

=== 1980s onwards ===
Following a search for a missing woman in the Dornoch area in 1981, a group met in February 1982 to discuss the establishment of an organised team, able to assist Police and other emergency services should the need arise. At the meeting, the senior Police officer in Dornoch suggested that the greatest difficulty encountered, was when a boat was required, and that the group should concentrate on the provision of an Inshore rescue boat. Thus was the beginning of East Sutherland Rescue Association.

Discussion were held with both the RNLI and H.M. Coastguard, only the latter supporting the idea. A fundraising target of £3000 was set, and financial support came in from various Councils and Development boards. No sooner had a boat been borrowed for training purposes, than a call came in to rescue a six-year-old girl, Laura Sinclair, blown out to sea in an inflatable dinghy. The subsequent publicity boosted funds, and a 4 m (13 ft) Avon S260 Inflatable boat was ordered. The new boat arrived in July 1983, and for the first time in 79 years, Dornoch had a lifeboat. At a ceremony on 7 August 1983, the new boat was named Laura Sinclair.

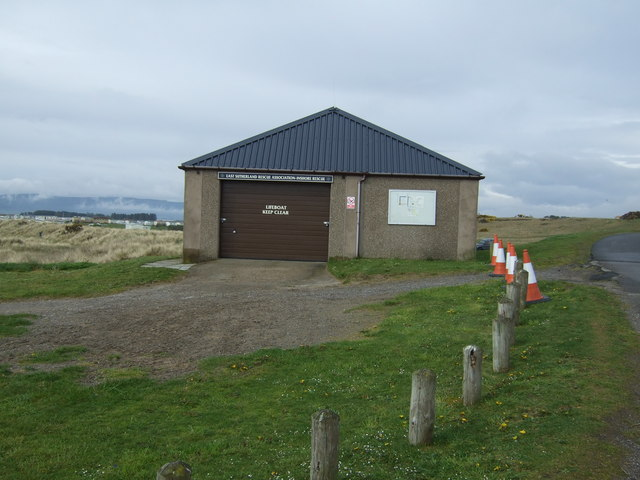
1984 ESRA boathouse

Approaches were made to Sutherland District Council, and permission was granted to convert a derelict building at Dornoch beach into a boathouse. Conversion work started in November 1983, and a peppercorn rent was negotiated of £1.00 per annum, with full rates relief.

In 2013, the Vessel Standards Branch of the MCA issued 'The Rescue Boat Code: The Code of Practice for Open Rescue Boats of Less than 15 Metres in Length'. The 166 page document setting out the standards required of lifeboats, equipment and buildings, was likely to have severe consequences for the operations at Dornoch, with the existing boat coming to the end of its service life.

A surprise phone call then brought the news that Charles Cadogan, 8th Earl Cadogan wished to fund the purchase of a new lifeboat. The 5.00 m (16.40 ft) Ribcraft RIB Glen Cassley arrived on station later in 2014, meeting all the code requirements of the MCA code. Work progressed to bring the boathouse up to code standards, but it was a tall task, as there was no mains electricity, no mains water supply, and in fact, no toilets. A further surprise came in 2018, when after discovering the problems with the boathouse, Lord Codagan further offered to fund the construction of a new boat house. ESRA were finally able to start plans for the construction of a new station. An application was made to Dornoch Common Good Fund, to lease 14,100 ft^{2} (1,310 m^{2}) of land next to the existing building.

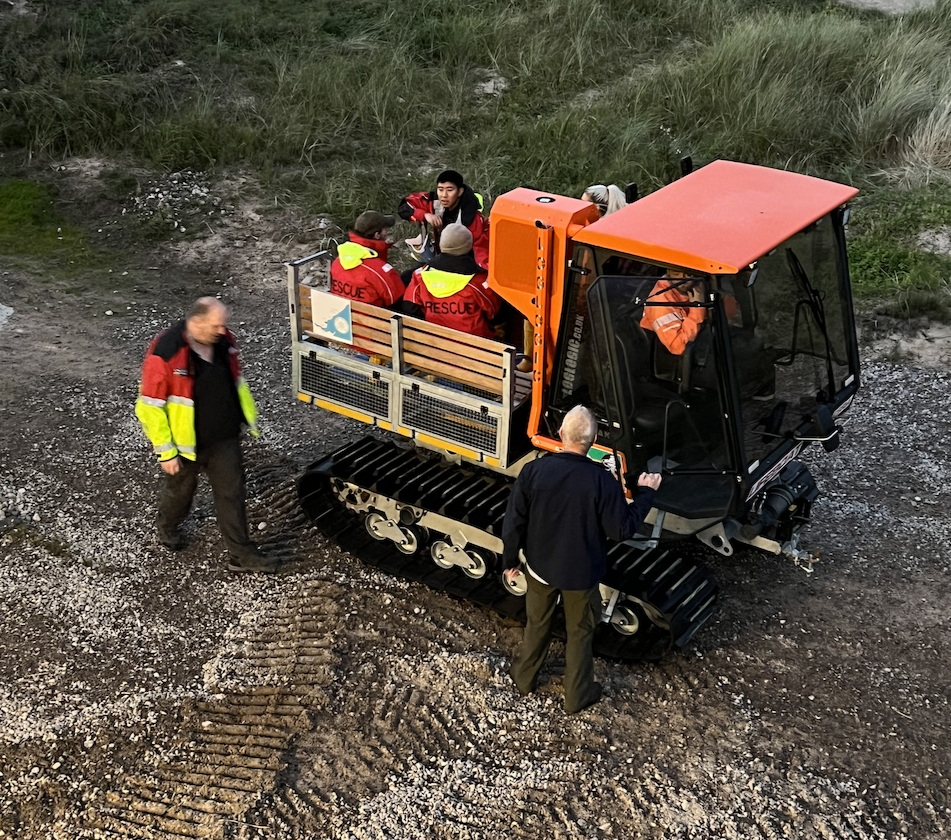
Softrak Launch Vehicle

In 2021, ESRA received the news that Highland-based land conservation and tourism business, Wildland Limited, owned by Danish billionaire Anders Holch Povlsen, were to meet the entire cost of a new 8 m (26 ft) state-of-the-art Ribcraft Pro-800 RIB, fitted with twin 150-hp Honda engines, and capable of a top speed of 40 knots. A bespoke 'Drive-on Drive-off' (Do-Do) launch trailer was also to be supplied, along with a Softrak launch vehicle. However, in a deal of benefit to both ESRA and the RNLI, the Softrak was exchanged for a much more capable Clayton Engineering Talus MB-H amphibious tractor, T118.

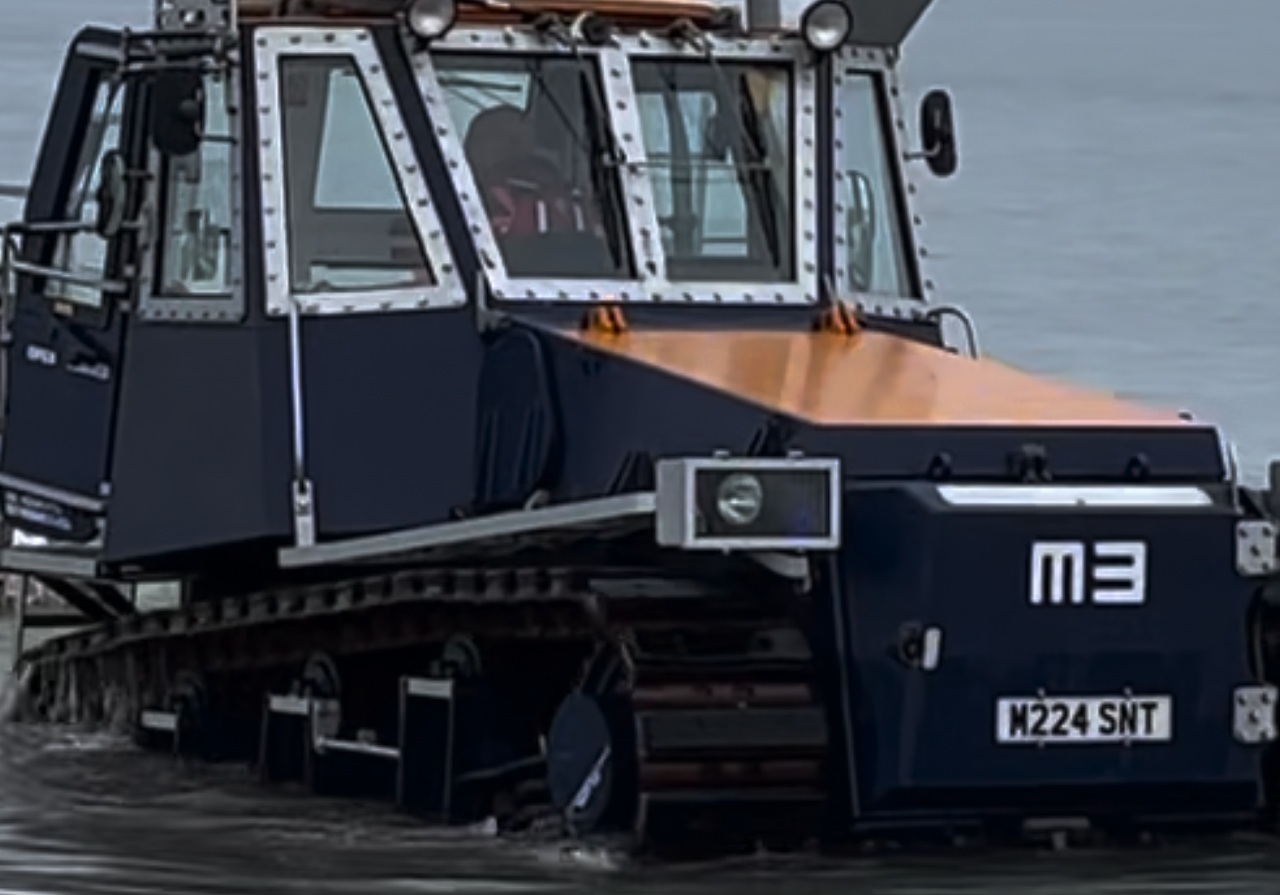
ESRA T118 Talus MB-H Launch Tractor

On Sunday 14 August 2022, ESRA celebrated the opening of their new station building, constructed at a cost of £550,000. The building was made possible by the donation of £400,000 from Lord Cadogan, and was named 'The Cadogan Lifeboat Station' in his honour.

The new lifeboat arrived on station on 9 August 2023. At a ceremony on Sunday 20 August 2023, accompanied by local bagpiper Michael Fraser, the new boat was officially named Wildland by Kim Tulloch DL, in honour of the donors.

In recognition of over 40 years service to East Sutherland Rescue Association, and for services to the community in East Sutherland, retiring chairman Neil Dalton was awarded the MBE in the 2025 King's Birthday Honours.

== Station honours ==
- Member, Order of the British Empire (MBE)

John Neil Dalton, Chair, East Sutherland Rescue Association – 2025KBH

== Inshore lifeboats ==
=== Lifeboats ===
Name	On Station	Class	Engine	Comments
Laura Sinclair	1983–1988	4.25 m (13.9 ft) Avon S260 Inflatable	40 hp Yamaha	
Laura Sinclair II	1988–1997	4.50 m (14.8 ft) Humber Shallow Draft RIB	45 hp Mariner	
William B Ashplant	1997–2005	4.75 m (15.6 ft) Ribcraft RIB	45 hp Yamaha	
Tim Jarvis	2005–2014	5.00 m (16.40 ft) Ribcraft RIB	50 hp Honda	
Glen Cassley	2014–	5.00 m (16.40 ft) Ribcraft RIB	60 hp engine	
Wildland	2023–	8.00 m (26.25 ft) Ribcraft Pro-800 RIB	Twin 150 hp Honda	

=== Launch vehicles ===
Name	On Station	Class	Reg No.	Comments
T118	2022–	Talus MB-H amphibious tractor	M224 SNT	Previously at St Ives and Newcastle.

== See also ==
- Independent lifeboats in Britain and Ireland
- List of former RNLI stations
