= Ferryside Lifeboat =

Search and rescue service in Carmarthenshire, Wales

- Bad Achub Glan-Y-Fferi
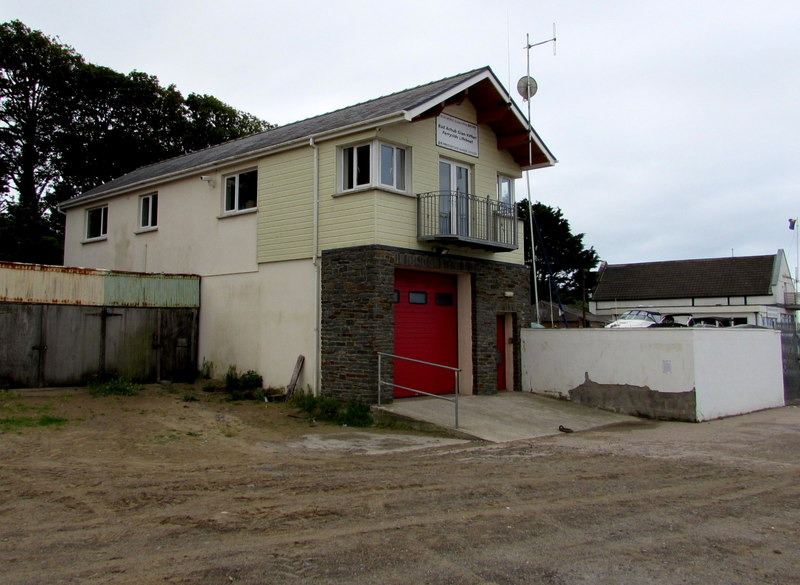
- Ferryside Lifeboat Station

- Ferryside, Carmarthenshire

General information
- Status: Operational
- Type: Lifeboat Station
- Location: Ferryside Life Boat Station, Ferryside, Carmarthenshire, SA17 5SF, United Kingdom
- Coordinates: 51°46′08.2″N 4°22′11.2″W
- Opened: 1966

Website
- Ferryside Lifeboat

Ferryside Lifeboat is located at Ferryside Beach in Ferryside, a village in the community of St Ishmael, on the east shore of the River Towy estuary, overlooking the Three Rivers estuary and Carmarthen Bay, approximately 9 miles (14 km) south-west of Carmarthen, in Carmarthenshire, South Wales.

The independent search and rescue (SAR) service was established in 1966, and operated under St John Ambulance Cymru, although the origins of a lifeboat service in the area date back to 1835. In 2025, the service was re-organised as a standalone Independent service and charity.

Ferryside Lifeboat currently operates a 6.4 m (21 ft) Ribcraft RIB, The Freemason, on station since 2012.

== History ==
In 1835, the Royal National Institution for the Preservation of Life from Shipwreck (RNIPLS) established Carmarthen Lifeboat Station, on the west side of the River Towy, actually on the River Taf estuary, at Laugharne. The station operated for just 8 years, until its closure in 1843. The RNIPLS would later became the Royal National Lifeboat Institution (RNLI) in 1854.

A meeting of the RNLI committee of management on 2 February 1860 reported the re-establishment of a lifeboat station in the area. Camarthen Bay Lifeboat Station was established at Ferryside, and a new lifeboat and its carriage arrived by rail on 21 January 1860.

Around 1893, Carmarthen Bay Lifeboat Station was starting to be known as Ferryside Lifeboat Station.

By 1960, the River Towy was no longer being used commercially, suffering from silting. With decreasing demand for a lifeboat, the RNLI closed Ferryside Lifeboat Station on 30 June 1960.

For further information, please see:–

- Ferryside RNLI Lifeboat Station

=== Independence ===
The need to re-establish a rescue service was recognised in the early 1960s by members of the Llanelli division of St. John Ambulance Cymru, in response to a surge in the amount of water-based leisure activity. A beach patrol service commenced in 1966, carried out by St. John cadets, under the guidance of the late Wilf Holloway. Ferryside Lifeboat was established, following the donation of a small inflatable boat from local Llanelli manufacturer Avon Inflatables Ltd.

With the former RNLI station building having been acquired by the River Towy Yacht Club, Ferryside Lifeboat operated from little more than a shed on the beach for over 40 years. In 2010, a new boathouse was finally constructed, just yards away from the original building. At a ceremony on 30 March 2010, a service of dedication was carried out by The Rev Canon Aled Griffiths, St John Chaplain for Carmarthenshire. The new building, costing £90,000, was then formally opened by H.R.H. The Duchess of Gloucester, Commandant-in-Chief, St. John Ambulance (Wales).

On Saturday 1 September 2012, with music provided by the Carmarthen Symphonic Wind Band, a service of dedication and naming ceremony was held at the boathouse, following the arrival of a new 6.4 m (21 ft) Ribcraft RIB, the ninth lifeboat in service since 1966. The lifeboat, costing approximately £80,000, was funded from local fundraising, and a major donation of £50,000 from the Province of West Wales Freemasons. The lifeboat was handed to the care of Ferryside Lifeboat by Deputy Grand Master Brian Hilling, after which the boat was named The Freemason.

Fundraising began in 2016, to buy a more reliable launch tractor. With a grant of £10,000 from Trinity House, and the gift of £2,500 via the Pendine branch of J & J Wilson (shops) ltd, a second-hand Talus MB-H amphibious tractor, was acquired from the RNLI. The vehicle, originally built, and now refurbished, by Clayton Engineering, is completely watertight, can be fully submerged, and was originally designed for the towing and launching of Mersey-class All-weather lifeboats through water, sand and mud. This specific vehicle, T112, was previously in service at Anstruther Lifeboat Station between 1991 and 2003. It arrived on station in Ferryside on Fri 30 June 2017.

In 2024, for reasons of mutual benefit, it was decided that the operations of St Johns Cymru, and the Ferryside Marine Division should be separated. Work was undertaken to establish Ferryside Lifeboat as a standalone charity, which was registered on 13 February 2025.

Ferryside Lifeboat is a registered charity (No. 1212126), has 'Declared Facility' status with H.M. Coastguard, and is a member of the National Independent Lifeboats Association (NILA).

== Ferryside independent lifeboats ==
=== Lifeboats ===
Name	Class	On Station	Engine	Comments
The Freemason	6.4 m (21 ft) Ribcraft RIB	2011–	Twin 115-hp Mariner	Refit in 2018

=== Launch and recovery tractors ===
Op.No. (Note: Op. No. is the RNLI's Operational Number of the boat or vehicle carried on the hull.)	Reg. No.	Type	On Station	Comments
T112	H977 SNT	Talus MB-H Crawler	2017–	Formerly at Anstruther

== See also ==
- Independent lifeboats in Britain and Ireland
- List of RNLI stations
- List of former RNLI stations
