= Hemsby Lifeboat =

Independent Search and rescue service in Norfolk, England

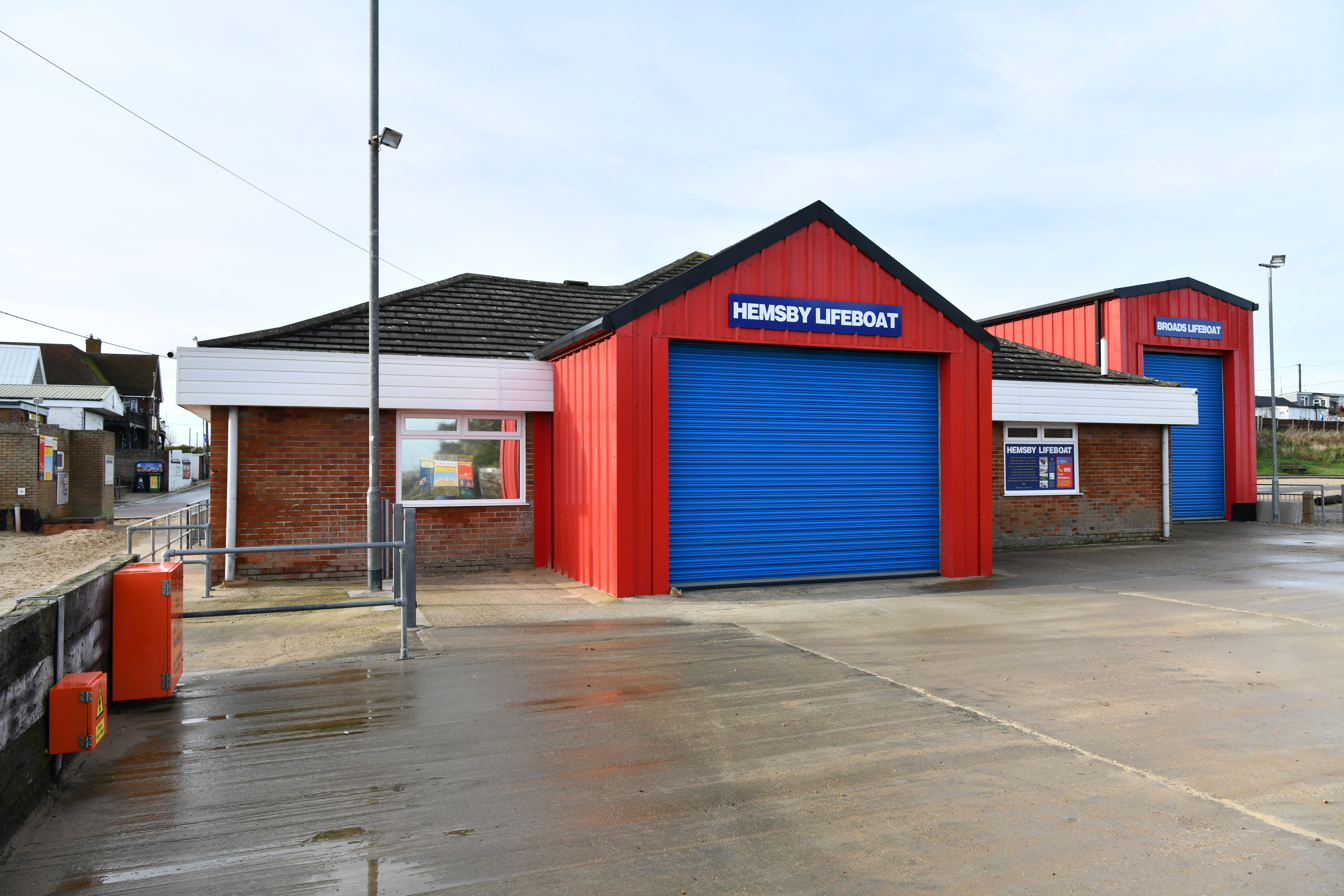
- Hemsby Lifeboat Station

- Hemsby, Norfolk
- Former names: Hemsby Volunteer Inshore Rescue Club; Hemsby Inshore Rescue Service

General information
- Status: Operational
- Type: Lifeboat Station
- Location: The Marrams, Beach Road, Hemsby, Norfolk, NR29 4JN, United Kingdom
- Coordinates: 52°41′41.7″N 1°42′29.5″E
- Opened: 1976

Hemsby Lifeboat, also known as Hemsby Inshore Rescue Service (HIRS), is located at The Marrams, off Beach Road in Hemsby, a seaside town sitting approximately 8 miles (13 km) north of Great Yarmouth, on the east coast of Norfolk, England.

This Independent search and rescue (SAR) service was conceived in 1975 as Hemsby Volunteer Inshore Rescue Club, becoming Hemsby Inshore Rescue Service in 1976.

Hemsby Lifeboat currently operates an Atlantic 75 Inshore lifeboat, Sea Weaver, on station since 2021, a D-class (IB1) Inshore Lifeboat, Civil Service 52, on station since 2025, and a 14 ft (4.3 m) Seastrike 'Dory', Broads Marley, used for Inland rescue on the Norfolk Broads, on station since 2015.

== History ==
In 1969, the Royal National Lifeboat Institution (RNLI) withdrew the lifeboat at Caister, the nearest lifeboat station to Hembsby. The Caister Volunteer Lifeboat Service was established almost immediately, but in its early days, was only operating a small 16 feet (4.9 m) fibreglass boat, and an inflatable Inshore rescue boat. The next nearest lifeboat was the small D-class Inshore boat at Happisburgh, some 13 miles (21 km) to the north. Even when Caister got an All-weather lifeboat in 1973, it was a 20-year-old Liverpool-class, capable of only eight knots.

With no nearby lifeboat, a series of over 12 drownings in the local area prompted local residents to establish Hemsby Volunteer Inshore Rescue Club in 1976. Initially, a 4.5 m (15 ft) Avon inflatable boat was loaned from the local Sub-Aqua club. During 1976, the lifeboat was called six times.

With a donation from the Norfolk Broads Lions Club, Hemsby Inshore Rescue Service (HIRS) purchased a 5 m (16 ft) Avon Searider RIB with a 40bhp Mercury outboard engine in December 1976. In recognition of the donors, it was named Sealion 1.

The next years (1977–1978) saw HIRS registered as a charity. A Landrover was acquired for launching the boat, and pagers were provided to the crew. The lifeboat was called 19 times in the two-year period.

In 2015, the service acquired a 14 ft (4.3 m) Seastrike 9X / Goodchild Marine 'Dory'. The boat is best suited for rescue work on the Norfolk Broads, which accounts for over 50% of the calls. The boat can be towed to over thirty launching sites around the Broads.

A new Inshore lifeboat arrived at Hemsby in 2021. The former RNLI Atlantic 75 had previously seen service at Sunderland and Stonehaven. However, even before the boat arrived at the boathouse, it was called into service, to assist with the recovery of a lady who had fallen down the steps at California Cliffs. On 12 December 2021, the boat was officially named Sea Weaver, recognising the funds raised by the efforts of Hemsby resident Sue Weaver, who by 2023, had raised over £100,000 for the service.

To assist with launching over the eroding coastline, in 2023, Hemsby Lifeboat committed £45,000 towards the purchase and refurbishment of a former RNLI Talus MB-H amphibious tractor (T116). The 19-tonne launch vehicle, previously used to launch Mersey-class All-weather lifeboats, is able to cope with both deeper water and changing launch site conditions, and can be fully submerged. The vehicle would dramatically reduce both launch and recovery times.

With coastal erosion a continuing problem on the east Norfolk coastline, Hemsby Lifeboat announced in January 2024, that they were actively seeking a new location for their lifeboat station. Over 300 m (980 ft) of coast has been lost at Hemsby since the 1970s, with over 25 homes lost to the sea since 2015. A storm in October 2024 washed away the launch ramp at the station, and although quickly repaired, this was again lost during Storm Darragh in December 2024.

On 9 October 2025, Hemsby Lifeboat added a third craft to their fleet, when they took delivery of a former RNLI D-class (IB1) Inshore lifeboat, previously stationed at Portrush.

Hemsby Lifeboat is a registered charity (No. 274451), has 'Declared Facility' status with H.M. Coastguard, and is a member of the National Independent Lifeboats Association (NILA).

== Hemsby lifeboats ==
=== Lifeboats ===
Name	Class	On Station	Engine	Comments
Broads Marley	14 ft (4.3 m) Seastrike 9X / Goodchild Marine Dory	2015–	Single 40-hp Mercury	
Sea Weaver	Atlantic 75	2021–	Twin 75-hp Yamaha	Formerly RNLB Jack & Joyce Burcombe, (B-762) at Sunderland and Stonehaven
Civil Service 52	D-class (IB1)	2025–	Single 50-hp Mariner	Formerly David Roulston (Civil Service No. 52) (D-738) at Portrush

=== Launch vehicles ===
Name	On Station	Class	Reg No.	Comments
T116	2023–	Talus MB-H amphibious tractor	K920 DUJ	Previously at Aldeburgh and Dungeness.

== See also ==
- Independent lifeboats in Britain and Ireland
- List of RNLI stations
- List of former RNLI stations
