= Stonehaven Lifeboat Station =

RNLI lifeboat station in Aberdeenshire, Scotland

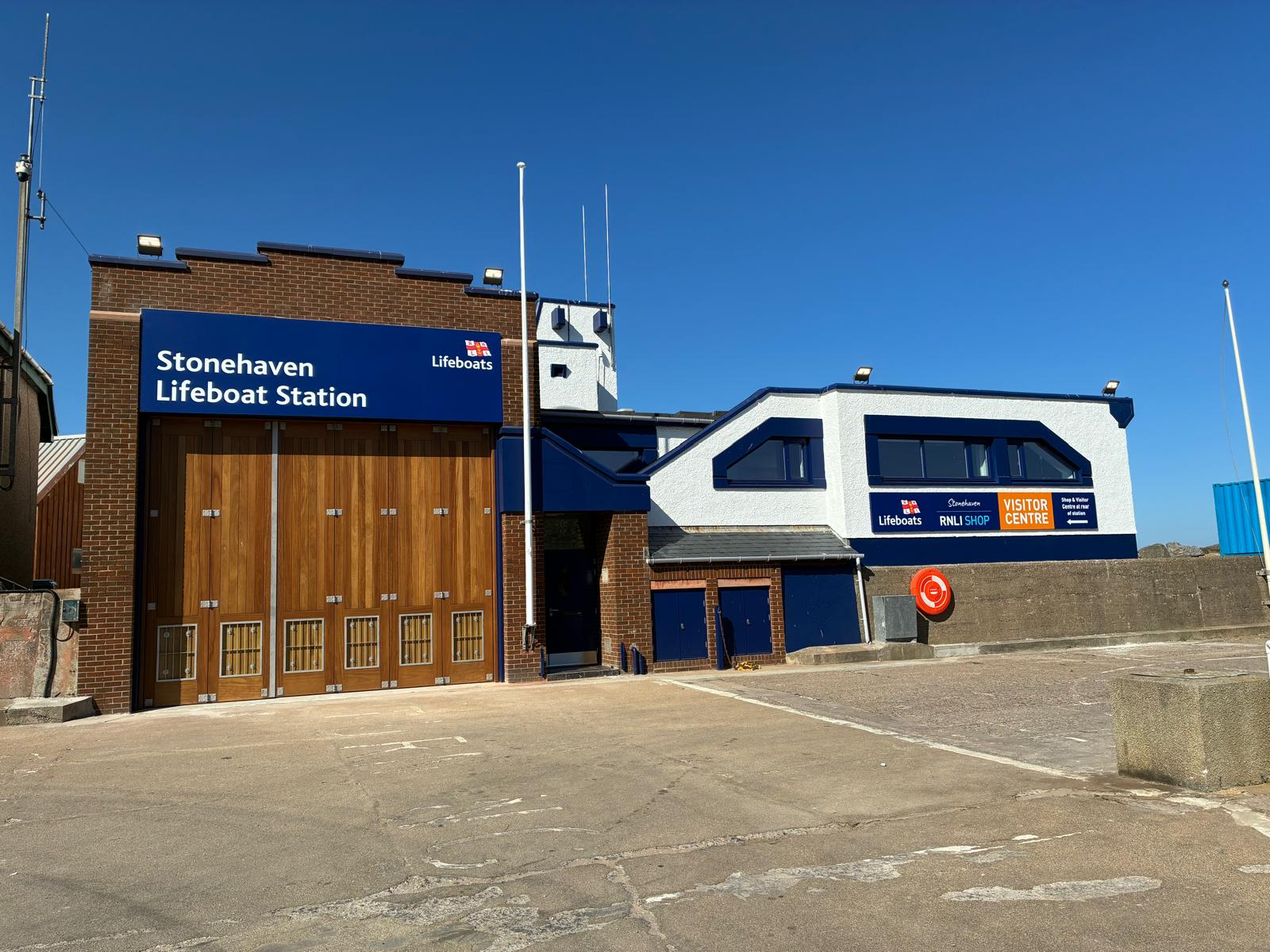
- Stonehaven Lifeboat Station 2025

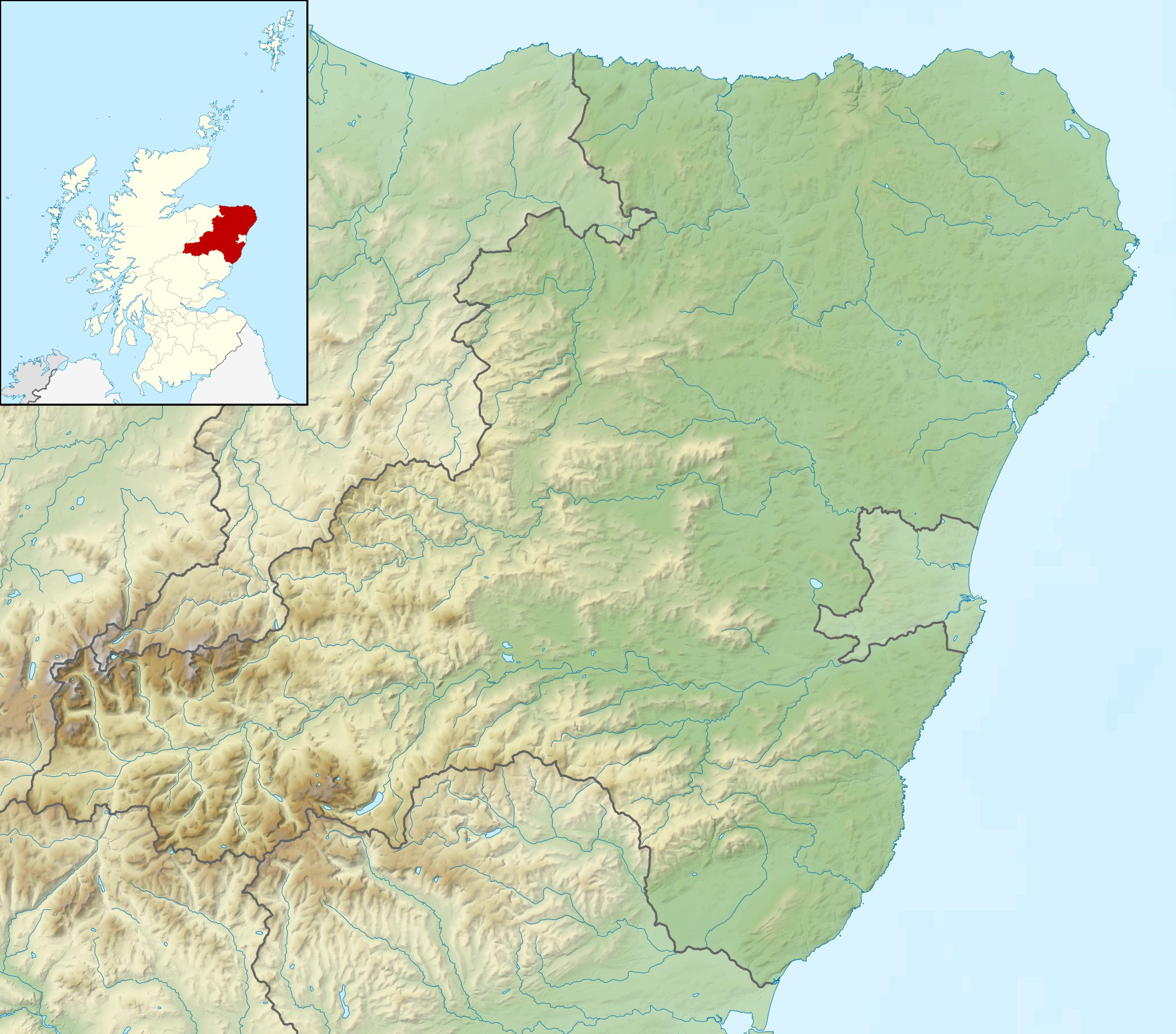
- Location within Aberdeenshire

General information
- Type: RNLI Lifeboat Station
- Location: Old Pier, The Harbour, Stonehaven, Aberdeenshire, AB39 2JU, Scotland
- Coordinates: 56°57′38.2″N 2°12′04.5″W
- Opened: 1854–1868 KLA; 1868–1934 RNLI; 1967–1984 RNLI ILB; 1984–2012 MRI; 2013–present RNLI ILB
- Owner: Royal National Lifeboat Institution

Website
- Stonehaven RNLI Lifeboat Station

Stonehaven Lifeboat Station is located at Old Pier, in Stonehaven, a harbour town 14.5 miles (23.3 km) south of Aberdeen, in Aberdeenshire, historically Kincardineshire, on the east coast of Scotland.

A lifeboat was first stationed at Stonehaven by the Kincardineshire Lifeboat Association in 1854. Management of the station was transferred to the Royal National Lifeboat Institution (RNLI) in 1868, operating a lifeboat there until 1934, when the station was closed.

The RNLI reopened Stonehaven as an Inshore lifeboat station in 1967, but it closed in 1984, due to operational inactivity. Stonehaven's Maritime Rescue Institute would provide a rescue service until it was forced to close in 2012, restarted in 2013 and operated once again by the RNLI.

The station currently operates Jamie Hunter (B-919), a B-class (Atlantic 85) Inshore lifeboat, on station since 2019.

== History ==
Stonehaven first received a lifeboat in 1854, when one was presented to the Kincardineshire Lifeboat Association (KLA) by Miss Lydia Ann Barclay, of Aberdeen, a Minister for the Gospel, for the Society of Friends.

A letter of 27 February 1867 from Mr Sheriff Wilson of Stonehaven was considered at the meeting of the RNLI committee of management on Thursday 7 March, stating that the KLA were prepared to transfer the Stonehaven lifeboat station to the management of the RNLI. It was decided to form a branch of the Institution at Stonehaven, and that the station there should be fully renovated.

It was later reported that the local boatmen had lost all confidence in the KLA lifeboat, and were refusing to enrol as its crew. The boat was heavy to pull, and although supposedly of the self-righting type, was proven not to self-right.

In March 1868, a new 33 ft (10 m) self-righting 'Pulling and Sailing' (P&S) lifeboat, one with sails and (10) oars, along with its carriage, was transported to Aberdeen free of charge, by the Aberdeen Steam Navigation Company, from where it was transported to Stonehaven by rail. A new boathouse had been constructed on the south side of the pier, at a cost of £203.

In a grand procession on 12 March 1868, the lifeboat, decorated in flags, was transported to the new boathouse from the railway station, accompanied by various members of the local magistrates and council, Freemasons, the artillery and rifle volunteers, fishermen, sailors, etc, along with a Highland piper, and a band. The lifeboat had been funded by a gift of £420 from Mrs George Burgess of London, and was named St George at her request.

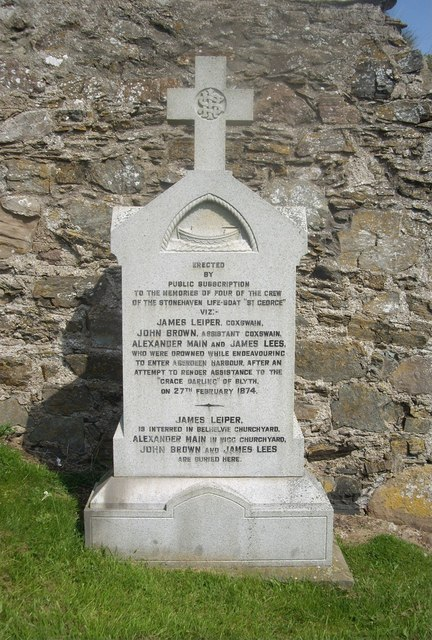
Memorial to the Stonehaven Lifeboat crew of 1874

On 27 February 1874, the Stonehaven lifeboat St George was launched to the aid of the barque Grace Darling of Blyth, Northumberland, which was displaying distress signals, whilst being blown northwards past Stonehaven. As the lifeboat finally caught up with the vessel, the distress flags were seen to be taken down, and the barque continued on its voyage. Conditions too rough to return to Stonehaven, the lifeboat made for Aberdeen, but capsized as she crossed the bar, and was wrecked, Four lifeboat men were lost.

The Grace Darling was wrecked the following day at Rattray Head, Aberdeenshire, with the loss of 14 of her 15 crew. A replacement lifeboat was placed at Stonehaven in 1874. Another 33 ft (10 m) (10-oared) self-righting (P&S) lifeboat, named Star, which would serve Stonehaven until 1888.

A new lifeboat would be sent to Stonehaven in 1888. The Alexander Black (ON 147) was a slightly larger 34 ft (10 m) self-righting lifeboat. To accommodate the boat, a new boathouse was constructed along Shorehead beyond the South Pier, at a cost of £327, completed in 1890.

On 16 December 1911, the schooner Hiskilina of Westerhaven (Groningen), was on passage from Granton, Edinburgh to Germany with a cargo of coal, when she was seen in distress off Stonehaven Bay. The Stonehaven lifeboat Alexander Black was launched at 09:00. The vessel sank before the lifeboat arrived, but the four crew had managed to get aboard the ship's boat, and were all rescued. The Stonehaven Lifeboat would receive the thanks of the German Government for their actions.

The Alexander Black would serve at Stonehaven until 1916. In preparation for a replacement lifeboat, yet another boathouse was constructed in 1913, this time on the north side of the harbour at Old Pier. In 1916, a 35 ft (11 m) self-righting lifeboat was placed at Stonehaven, and named Joseph Ridgway (ON 652).

In 1934, after 18 years service, the Joseph Ridgway was withdrawn, and sold. With motor-powered lifeboats to the north at Aberdeen, to the south at Montrose, and an existing P&S boat at Gourdon, the station was closed.

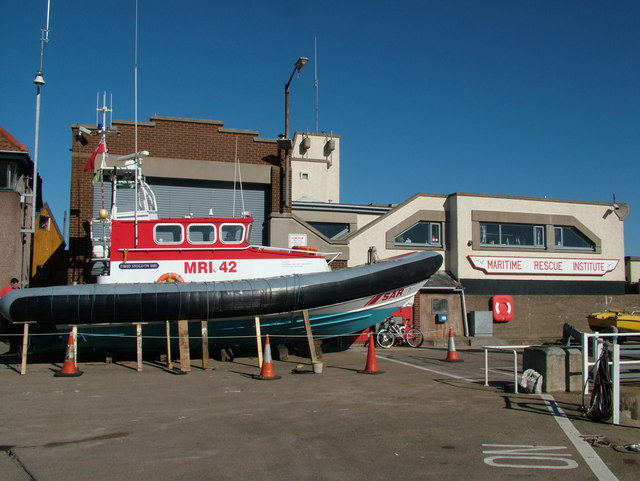
Maritime Rescue Institute, Stonehaven

=== 1967 onwards ===
In 1967, responding to a huge increase in water-based leisure activity seen nationally, the RNLI re-established a station at Stonehaven, placing one of the small fast D-class (RFD PB16) Inshore lifeboats at the station. However, with little operational activity, the Inshore lifeboat was withdrawn at the end of the summer season in October 1984, and the station was closed once again.

A rescue service would be taken up by Stonehaven's Maritime Rescue Institute, a Scottish Charity, which also provided advisory and training services in marine emergency response and rescue, and research, development and evaluation of SAR services. The charity operated until 2013, when damage sustained in the storms of 2012 forced their closure.

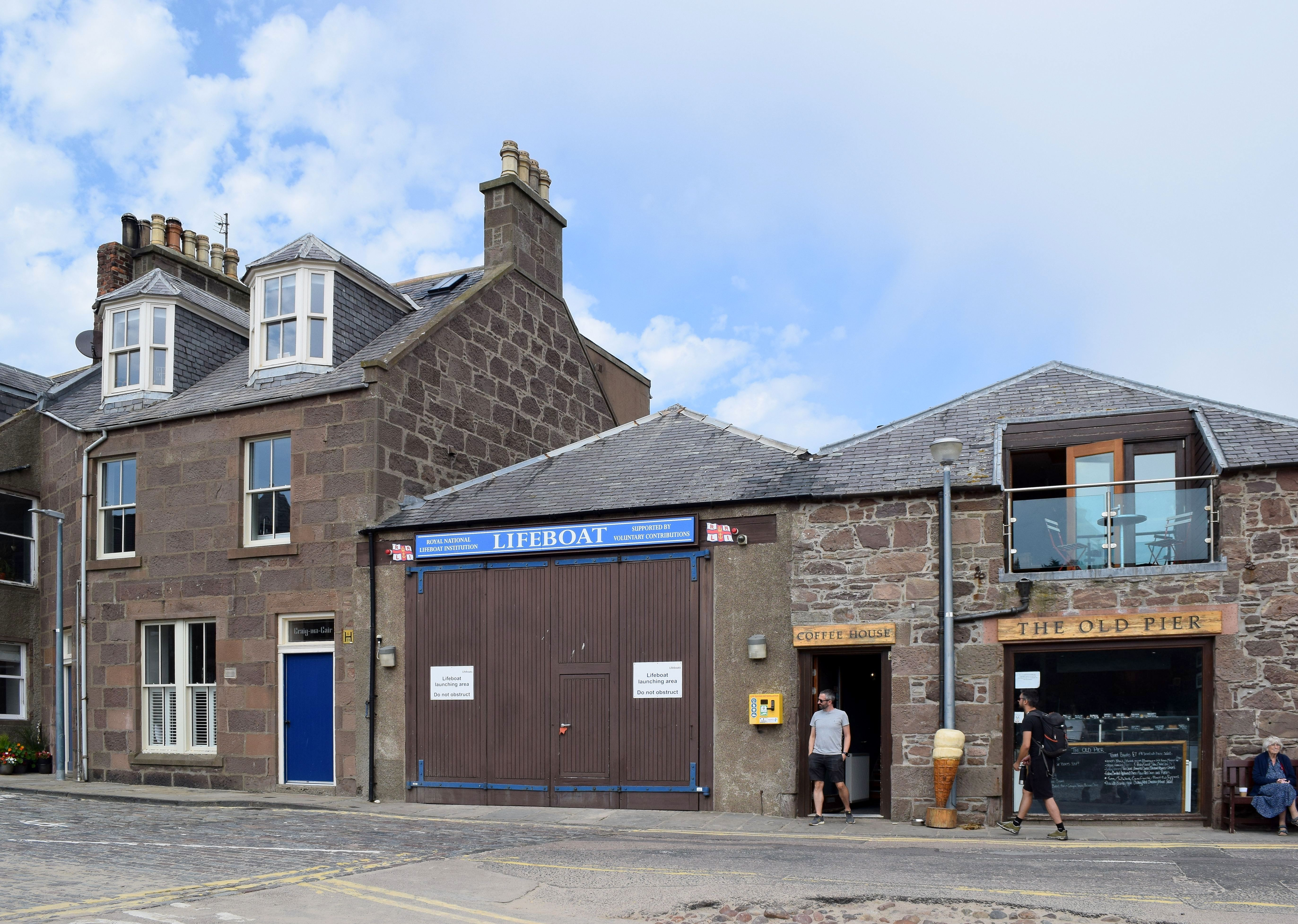
Stonehaven lifeboat station in 2022

In 2013, operations were once again taken over by the RNLI. The B-class (Atlantic 75) Alexander Cattanach (B-740) was placed at Stonehaven on trial in 2013, before the assignment of a permanent lifeboat, Jack & Joyce Burcombe (B-762). In 2019, the last Atlantic 75 in Scotland, Miss Betty (B-782), was retired, and replaced with a new Atlantic 85, Jamie Hunter (B-919).

A ceremony was held on 6 September 2025, to mark the formal opening of the new lifeboat station at Stonehaven. The station has moved along the quay, to the former Maritime Rescue Institute building. Conversion work started in 2024, and was completed at a cost of £1.2 million. The new station features up-to-date crew facilities, training rooms, changing and shower facilities, and a boat hall large enough to accommodate the lifeboat, launching tractor and trailer, all under the same roof. Additionally, the station has a new fundraising shop, and a visitor display area. The day also marked the formal naming ceremony for the B-class (Atlantic 85) Inshore lifeboat Jamie Hunter (B-919), on station since 2019, but delayed by the COVID-19 pandemic, and later by construction work.

== Station honours ==
The following are awards made at Stonehaven:

- Albert Medal (Second Class)
  James Crowden, Chief Officer, H.M. Coastguard – 1869
- RNIPLS Silver Medal
  John Leslie, Master Mariner – 1849
  Daniel Sutherland, Boatman, H.M. Coastguard – 1850
  John Chaddock, Commissioned Boatman, H.M. Coastguard – 1853
  Robert Collison, Master of the William and John – 1853
- RNLI Silver Medal
  James Crowden, Chief Officer, H.M. Coastguard – 1869
- Thanks of the German Government
  Stonehaven Lifeboat – 1911

== Roll of honour ==
In memory of those lost whilst serving at Stonehaven:

- On service to the schooner Olive on 4 April 1849
  Edmund Balls, H.M. Coastguard
  Alexander Angus
- Lost when the lifeboat St. George capsized entering Aberdeen harbour, having abandoned their rescue attempts of the barque Grace Darling, 27 February 1874.
  James Leiper, Coxswain
  John Brown, Assistant Coxswain
  Alexander Main
  James Lees

== Stonehaven lifeboats ==
=== Kincardineshire Lifeboat Association ===
Name	Built	On station	Class	Comments
Unknown	1854	1854−1868	Self-righting lifeboat	(Note: Self-righting lifeboat of unknown dimensions, gift of Miss Lydia A. Barclay of Aberdeen, built by Skinner of Aberdeen.); Crew confidence lost as could not self-right.

=== RNLI ===
==== Pulling and Sailing (P&S) lifeboats ====
ON (Note: ON is the RNLI's Official Number of the boat.)	Name	Built	On station	Class	Comments
Pre-491	St. George	1867	1868−1874	33-foot Peake self-righting (P&S)	(Note: 33 ft 0 in (10.06 m) x 8 ft 6 in (2.59 m) (10-oared) Peake-class self-righting (P&S) lifeboat, gift of Mrs G. Burgess of St Johns Wood, built by Forrestt of Limehouse, London, costing £276.); Wrecked on service, 27 February 1874.
Pre-582	Star	1874	1874−1888	33-foot Peake self-righting (P&S)	(Note: 33 ft 0 in (10.06 m) x 8 ft 6 in (2.59 m) (10-oared) self-righting (P&S) lifeboat, gift of Mrs G. Hearn of Buckingham, built by Forrestt of Limehouse, London, costing £323.); Sold in 1888.
147	Alexander Black	1888	1888−1916	34-foot self-righting (P&S)	(Note: 34 ft 0 in (10.36 m) x 8 ft 0 in (2.44 m) (10-oared) self-righting (P&S) lifeboat, gift of Mrs G. A. Black of Hyde Park, built by D. and W. Henderson and Company of Partick, costing £422.); Sold in 1916.
652	Joseph Ridgway	1915	1916−1934	35-foot Rubie self-righting (P&S)	(Note: 35 ft 0 in (10.67 m) x 8 ft 10 in (2.69 m) (10-oared) Rubie-class self-righting (P&S) lifeboat, legacy of Miss J. Lewis of Southport, built by Summers & Payne of Southampton, costing £2,137.); Sold in 1934. Renamed Sarah Louise, Logos and El Pamarero. Under restoration at the River Yonne, Migennes, France, December 2024.

Pre ON numbers are unofficial numbers used by the Lifeboat Enthusiasts' Society to reference early lifeboats not included on the official RNLI list.
Station closed in 1934

==== Inshore lifeboats (D class) ====
Op.No. (Note: Op.No. is the RNLI's Operational Number of the boat carried on the hull.)	Name	On station	Class	Comments
D-22	Unnamed	1967	D-class (RFD PB16)	
D-121	Unnamed	1967–1975	D-class (RFD PB16)	
D-234	Unnamed	1975–1984	D-class (Zodiac III)	

Inshore Lifeboat withdrawn and station closed 1984

=== Maritime Rescue Institute ===
Number	Name	On station	Class	Comments
MRI 42	David Stogden MBE	2001–2012	Medina-class	Formerly Unnamed RNLB Medina-class (ON 1091)
MRI 28	Unnamed	2004–2012	8.5m Avon RIB	

MRI station closed 2012

=== RNLI ===
==== Inshore lifeboats (B class) ====
Op.No.	Name	On station	Class	Comments
B-740	Alexander Cattanach	2013–2014	B-class (Atlantic 75)	
B-774	Braemar	2014	B-class (Atlantic 75)	
B-762	Jack & Joyce Burcombe	2014–2017	B-class (Atlantic 75)	
B-782	Miss Betty	2017–2019	B-class (Atlantic 75)	
B-913	Pride of Fred. Olsen	2019	B-class (Atlantic 85)	
B-919	Jamie Hunter	2019–	B-class (Atlantic 85)	

=== Launch and recovery tractors ===
Op.No.	Reg.No.	On station	Type	Comments
TA98	SF59 FUA	2013–2014	New Holland B3045	
TA80	CU07 HDZ	2014	New Holland TL80	
ST03	WA54 KUX	2014–2023	Softrak Loglogic (Mk.1)	
ST02	WA54 HRP	2023–	Softrak Loglogic (Mk.1)	

== See also ==
- List of RNLI stations
- List of former RNLI stations
- Royal National Lifeboat Institution lifeboats
