= Isle of Whithorn Lifeboat Station =

Former RNLI lifeboat station in Dumfries and Galloway, Scotland

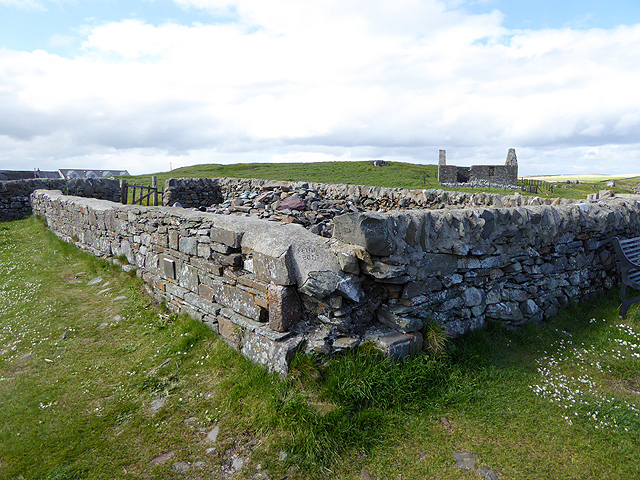
- Remains of the Lifeboat Station, Isle of Whithorn

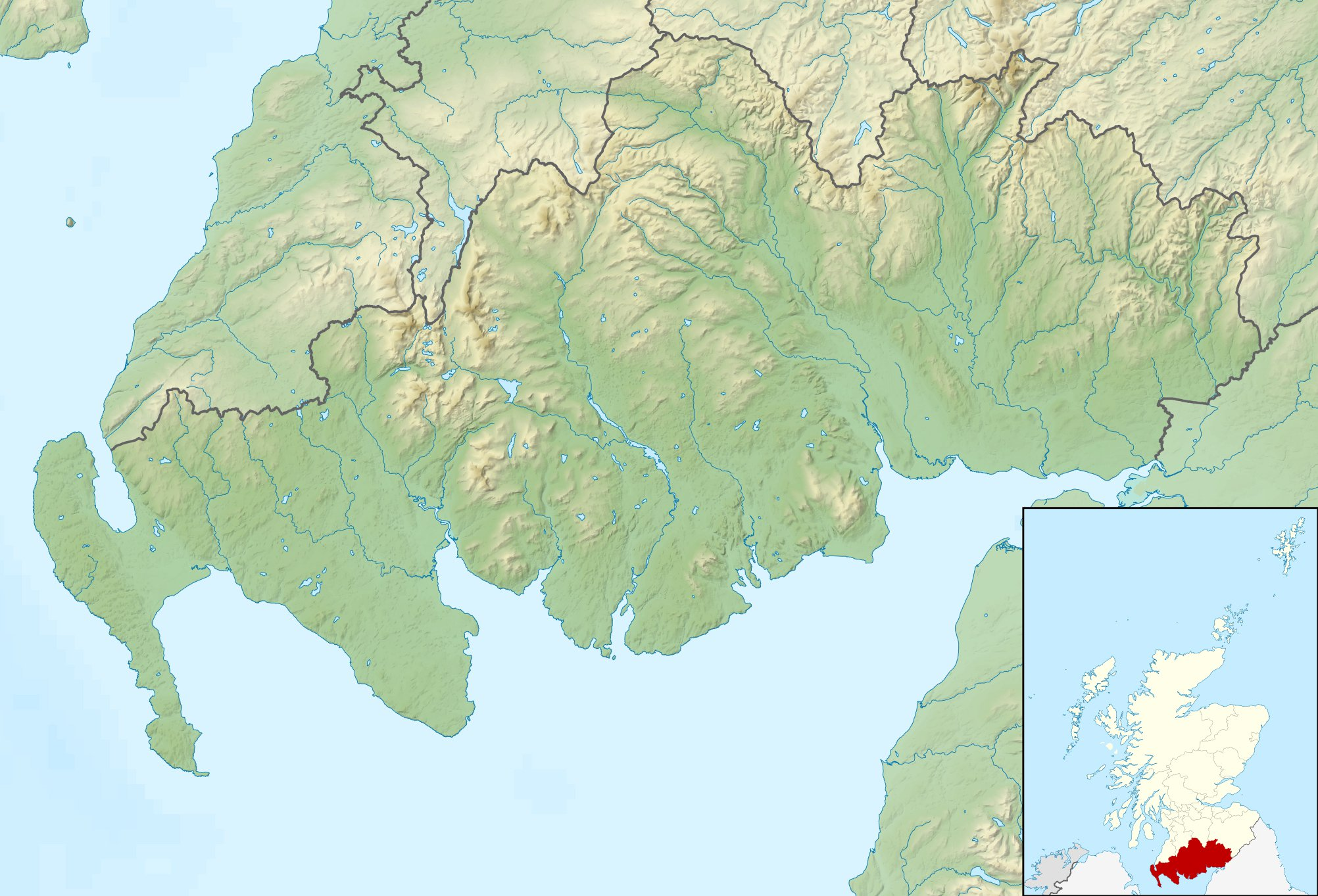
- Isle of Whithorn, Dumfries and Galloway

General information
- Status: Closed
- Type: RNLI Lifeboat Station
- Location: Lifeboat Station, Isle of Whithorn, Dumfries and Galloway, DG8 8LL, Scotland
- Coordinates: 54°41′50.9″N 4°21′39.4″W
- Opened: 1869
- Closed: 1919

Isle of Whithorn Lifeboat Station was located at the village and seaport of Isle of Whithorn, sitting near the southern tip of the Machars peninsula, approximately 33 miles (53 km) south-east of Stranraer, in the county of Dumfries and Galloway, historically Wigtownshire, in south-west Scotland.

A lifeboat was first stationed at the Isle of Whithorn by the Royal National Lifeboat Institution (RNLI) in 1869.

Isle of Whithorn Lifeboat Station closed in 1919.

== History ==
Following a request from local residents, the representation of C. W. M. S. McKerlie, Divisional Officer of H.M. Coastguard, and the report of the Inspector of Lifeboats following a visit, it was decided at the meeting of the RNLI Committee of Management on Thursday 8 April 1868, to establish a new lifeboat station at the village of Isle of Whithorn.

A stone built boathouse was constructed, costing £156-7s, in a location which would allow the lifeboat to be launched to the east or west. A 33-foot self-righting 'Pulling and Sailing' (P&S) lifeboat, one with sails and (10) oars, along with its launching carriage, was dispatched to Newton Stewart in September 1869 by rail, the Glasgow and South Western and the Portpatrick Railway Companies providing transportation at no cost.

Under the charge of Capt. D. Robertson, Assistant-Inspector of Life-boats on 27 September 1869, the lifeboat was taken from Newton Stewart in procession through several villages, to be kept overnight in the grounds of Galloway House at Sorbie, the home of Randolph Stewart, 9th Earl of Galloway.

The following day, in very wet weather, the boat was transported to Whithorn, where it was met by a large crowd, and then continued to the new boathouse. The entire cost of the lifeboat station had been funded by the gift of £620 from an anonymous lady from Edinburgh. At the following ceremony, Lady Isabel Maud Stewart named the lifeboat Charlie Peek in accordance with the donor's wishes, before the lifeboat was demonstrated to the assembled onlookers.

The first call on the lifeboat was on 3 May 1871. The smack Vale of Conwy, was on passage from Port Dinorwic to Irvine, Ayrshire, when it was seriously damaged when the mainboom broke, and sank. With the ship's boat also damaged, the crew of three had given up all hope, when the Isle of Whithorn lifeboat arrived, and all three were rescued.

The second lifeboat to be placed at the Isle of Whithorn station, was a 34-foot lifeboat named Henry and John Leighton (ON 85), arriving on station on 17 November 1886. The costs of the lifeboat and carriage were met by a contribution from the late Capt. Henry Leighton of Glasgow. The lifeboat arrived at the railway station, and a large crowd turned out to see the lifeboat drawn on its carriage by nine horses to the lifeboat station, where it was named by Miss A. Leighton in memory of her two brothers.

In 1901, Isle of Whithorn would receive their third and last lifeboat. The 35-foot Dungeness-class (Rubie) lifeboat was appropriated to the legacy of Mr George Levy of Wood Green, and was named George and Margaret (ON 476).

Isle of Whithorn Lifeboat Station was closed in 1919. The lifeboat house is now just a ruin. The lifeboat on station at the time, George and Margaret (ON 476), was transferred to the relief fleet, before serving at Aberdovey until 1931, when she was sold out of service.

== Isle of Whithorn lifeboats ==
=== Pulling and Sailing (P&S) lifeboats ===
ON (Note: ON is the RNLI's Official Number of the boat.)	Name	Built	On station	Class	Comments
Pre-528	Charlie Peek	1869	1869−1886	33-foot Peake Self-righting (P&S)	(Note: 33-foot x 8-foot 7in (10-oared) Peake-class self-righting (P&S) lifeboat, an anonymous gift, via Mr N. Griffiths of Blackheath, London, built by Forrestt of Limehouse, London, costing £281.)
85	Henry and John Leighton	1886	1886−1901	34-foot Self-righting (P&S)	(Note: 34-foot x 7-foot 6in (10-oared) self-righting (P&S) lifeboat, gift of the late Capt. H. Leighton of Glasgow, built by Forrestt of Limehouse, London, costing £295.)
476	George and Margaret	1901	1901−1919	35-foot Self-righting (P&S)	(Note: 35-foot x 8-foot 6in (10-oared) self-righting (P&S) lifeboat, legacy of Mr G. Levy of Wood Green, built by Thames Ironworks of Blackwall, London, costing £888.)

Pre ON numbers are unofficial numbers used by the Lifeboat Enthusiast Society to reference early lifeboats not included on the official RNLI list.

== See also ==
- List of RNLI stations
- List of former RNLI stations
- Royal National Lifeboat Institution lifeboats
