= Talus MB-H amphibious tractor =

RNLI amphibious launch tractor

Talus MB-H
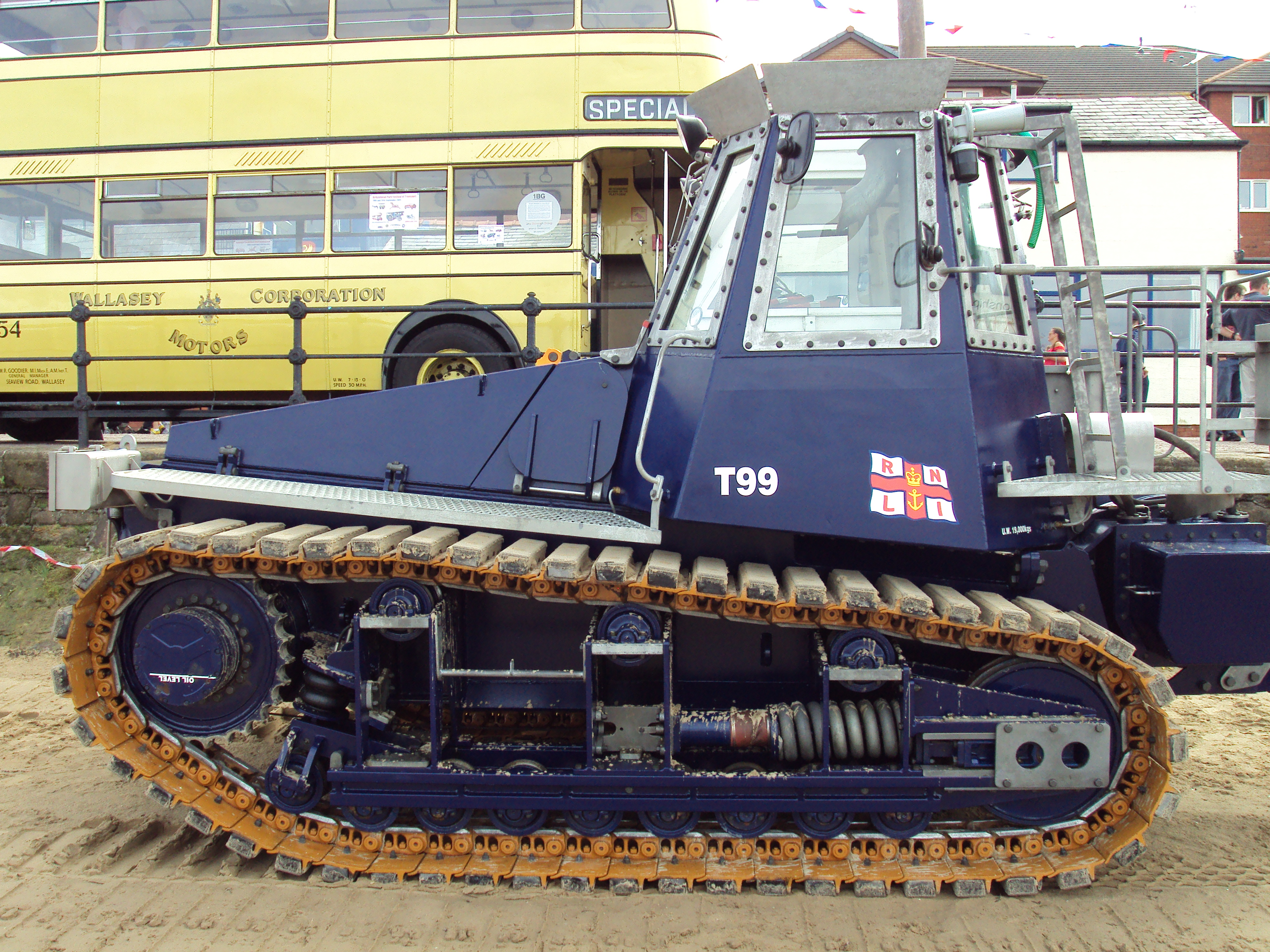
- Talus MB-H RNLI launch vehicle
- Type: Launch vehicle
- Manufacturer: Clayton Engineering Limited
- Production: 31
- Length: 216 in (5.5 m)
- Width: 96 in (2.4 m)
- Height: 117 in (3.0 m)
- Weight: 19.000 tonnes with track pads
- Propulsion: tracks
- Engine model: Caterpillar 3208 V8 Diesel
- Gross power: 210 hp (160 kW)
- Drawbar pull: 15 tonnes (18 tonnes max.) on bare drum
- Speed: 7.5 miles per hour (12.1 km/h)

Talus MB-H is a continuous track launch tractor which was specifically designed for the Royal National Lifeboat Institution (RNLI), to launch and recover carriage mounted lifeboats, particularly the Mersey-class lifeboat, from beach-launched lifeboat stations. In total, 31 tractors were manufactured by Clayton Engineering Limited of Knighton, Powys.

The Mersey-class has been replaced mostly with the new Shannon-class All-weather lifeboat, which uses the new Shannon Launch and Recovery System (SLARS) from Supacat and Clayton Engineering, or in some locations, with a B-class (Atlantic 85) Inshore lifeboat.

On 18 December 2025, the last RNLI Mersey-class All-weather lifeboat, 12-20 Leonard Kent (ON 1177) at Newcastle Lifeboat Station, County Down, was withdrawn from service. A final carriage launch, with the aid of the Talus MB-H (T-120), took place on 11 January 2026. The Newcastle Mersey-class was replaced with a B-class (Atlantic 85) and Talus MB-4H in late 2025.

Some of the surplus Talus MB-H tractors will be transferred for use at stations using the Inshore Atlantic 85, with a few retained in the relief fleet. The rest are likely to be sold out of service. The following list will include those tractors now in use with Independent rescue services where known.

All of the following fleet details are referenced to the 2026 Lifeboat Enthusiast Society Handbook, with information retrieved directly from RNLI records.

== Talus MB-H fleet ==
Op.No. (Note: Op.No. is the RNLI's Operational Number of the boat or vehicle carried on the hull.)	Reg.No.	Station	In service	Image	Pay-load	Comments
T91	UAW 558Y	Trials	1982–1983		–	
T91	UAW 558Y	Hoylake	1983–1986		–	
T91	UAW 558Y	Relief fleet	1986–1993		–	
T91	UAW 558Y	Wells-next-the-Sea	1993–1995		–	
T91	UAW 558Y	Relief fleet	1995–1997		–	
T91	UAW 558Y	Rhyl	1997–2007		–	
T91	UAW 558Y	Relief fleet	2007–2008		–	
T91	UAW 558Y	Llandudno	2008–2017		–	
T91	UAW 558Y	Relief fleet	2017–2019		–	
T91	UAW 558Y	Minehead	2019–2023		–	
T91	UAW 558Y	Storage	2023–		–	
T92	A462 AUX	Rhyl	1984–1997		B-class (Atlantic 85)	
T92	A462 AUX	Hoylake	1997–2007		B-class (Atlantic 85)	
T92	A462 AUX	Relief fleet	2007–2008		B-class (Atlantic 85)	
T92	A462 AUX	Ilfracombe	2008–2015		B-class (Atlantic 85)	
T92	A462 AUX	Relief fleet	2015–2019		B-class (Atlantic 85)	
T92	A462 AUX	Clovelly	2019–2020		B-class (Atlantic 85)	
T92	A462 AUX	Relief fleet	2020–2026		B-class (Atlantic 85)	
T92	A462 AUX	Hastings	2026–		B-class (Atlantic 85)	
T93	A496 CUX	Skegness	1984–1995			
T93	A496 CUX	Relief fleet	1995–1996			
T93	A496 CUX	Dungeness	1996–2005			
T93	A496 CUX	Relief fleet	2005–2007			
T93	A496 CUX	Rhyl	2007–2019			
T93	A496 CUX	Pett Level Rescue (Ind.)	2026–			
T94	B567 FAW	Relief fleet	1984–1986		B-class (Atlantic 85); Toby Rundle (B-872)	
T94	B567 FAW	Hoylake	1986–1997		B-class (Atlantic 85); Toby Rundle (B-872)	
T94	B567 FAW	Relief fleet	1997–1999		B-class (Atlantic 85); Toby Rundle (B-872)	
T94	B567 FAW	Llandudno	1999–2008		B-class (Atlantic 85); Toby Rundle (B-872)	
T94	B567 FAW	Relief fleet	2008–2011		B-class (Atlantic 85); Toby Rundle (B-872)	
T94	B567 FAW	Pwllheli	2011–2022		B-class (Atlantic 85); Toby Rundle (B-872)	
T94	B567 FAW	Relief fleet	2022–2024		B-class (Atlantic 85); Toby Rundle (B-872)	
T94	B567 FAW	Clovelly	2024–		B-class (Atlantic 85); Toby Rundle (B-872)	
T95	B188 GAW	Hastings	1985		–	Being broken for spares, July 2026.
T95	B188 GAW	Dungeness	1985–1996		–	Being broken for spares, July 2026.
T95	B188 GAW	Hastings	1997–2007		–	Being broken for spares, July 2026.
T95	B188 GAW	Relief fleet	2007–2008		–	Being broken for spares, July 2026.
T95	B188 GAW	Lytham St Annes	2008–2018		–	Being broken for spares, July 2026.
T96	B668 HUJ	Hastings	1985–1997		B-class (Atlantic 75); Tommy C	
T96	B668 HUJ	North Sunderland	1998–2006		B-class (Atlantic 75); Tommy C	
T96	B668 HUJ	Wells-next-the-Sea	2006–2023		B-class (Atlantic 75); Tommy C	
T96	B668 HUJ	Ballybunion (Ind)	2023–		B-class (Atlantic 75); Tommy C	
T97	C282 LNT	North Sunderland	1986–1998		B-class (Atlantic 85); Hugh Miles (B-896)	
T97	C282 LNT	Ilfracombe	1998–1999		B-class (Atlantic 85); Hugh Miles (B-896)	
T97	C282 LNT	Relief fleet	1999–2004		B-class (Atlantic 85); Hugh Miles (B-896)	
T97	C282 LNT	Barmouth	2004		B-class (Atlantic 85); Hugh Miles (B-896)	
T97	C282 LNT	Relief fleet	2004–2010		B-class (Atlantic 85); Hugh Miles (B-896)	
T97	85-D-8571	Clogherhead	2010–2013		B-class (Atlantic 85); Hugh Miles (B-896)	
T97	C282 LNT	Relief fleet	2013–2014		B-class (Atlantic 85); Hugh Miles (B-896)	
T97	C282 LNT	Aberdovey	2014–		B-class (Atlantic 85); Hugh Miles (B-896)	
T98	C168 NAW	Sheringham	1986–1992		–	
T98	C168 NAW	Relief fleet	1992–1996		–	
T98	C168 NAW	Cromer	1996–1999		–	
T98	C168 NAW	Relief fleet	1999–2000		–	
T98	C168 NAW	Pwllheli	2000–2011		–	
T98	C168 NAW	Training (Hurn)	2011		–	
T98	C168 NAW	Relief fleet	2011–2013		–	
T98	86-D-120010	Clogherhead	2013–2019		–	
T98	C168 NAW	Relief fleet	2019–2020		–	
T98	C168 NAW	Clovelly	2020–2024		–	
T98	C168 NAW	Storage	2024–		–	
T99	C82 NUX	Wells-next-the-Sea	1986–1993		–	
T99	C82 NUX	Relief fleet	1993–1995		–	
T99	C82 NUX	Wells-next-the-Sea	1995–2006		–	
T99	C82 NUX	Relief fleet	2006–2007		–	
T99	C82 NUX	Hoylake	2007–2014		–	
T99	C82 NUX	Relief fleet	2014–		–	
T100	D466 RAW	Bridlington	1986–1998		B-class (Atlantic 85); Hounslow Branch (B-950)	
T100	D466 RAW	Relief fleet	1998–1999		B-class (Atlantic 85); Hounslow Branch (B-950)	
T100	D466 RAW	Ilfracombe	1999–2008		B-class (Atlantic 85); Hounslow Branch (B-950)	
T100	D466 RAW	Relief fleet	2008–2009		B-class (Atlantic 85); Hounslow Branch (B-950)	
T100	D466 RAW	Bembridge	2009–2010		B-class (Atlantic 85); Hounslow Branch (B-950)	
T100	D466 RAW	Relief fleet	2010–2011		B-class (Atlantic 85); Hounslow Branch (B-950)	
T100	D466 RAW	New Quay	2011–2023		B-class (Atlantic 85); Hounslow Branch (B-950)	
T100	D466 RAW	Storage	2023–2024		B-class (Atlantic 85); Hounslow Branch (B-950)	
T100	D466 RAW	Walmer	2025–		B-class (Atlantic 85); Hounslow Branch (B-950)	
T101	D335 SUJ	Ilfracombe	1987–1998		B-class (Atlantic 85); Penny J II (B-939)	
T101	D335 SUJ	Relief fleet	1998–2000		B-class (Atlantic 85); Penny J II (B-939)	
T101	D335 SUJ	Bridlington	2000–2008		B-class (Atlantic 85); Penny J II (B-939)	
T101	D335 SUJ	Relief fleet	2008–2015		B-class (Atlantic 85); Penny J II (B-939)	
T101	MMN 258H	Ramsey	2015–2021		B-class (Atlantic 85); Penny J II (B-939)	
T101	D335 SUJ	Relief fleet	2022–2023		B-class (Atlantic 85); Penny J II (B-939)	
T101	D335 SUJ	Minehead	2023–		B-class (Atlantic 85); Penny J II (B-939)	
T102	E387 VAW	Llandudno	1987–1999		Atlantic 85-class Howard Bell (B-899)	
T102	E387 VAW	Relief fleet	1999–2001		Atlantic 85-class Howard Bell (B-899)	
T102	E387 VAW	New Quay	2001–2011		Atlantic 85-class Howard Bell (B-899)	
T102	E387 VAW	Relief fleet	2011–2013		Atlantic 85-class Howard Bell (B-899)	
T102	E387 VAW	Filey	2013–2019		Atlantic 85-class Howard Bell (B-899)	
T102	E387 VAW	Relief fleet	2019–2021		Atlantic 85-class Howard Bell (B-899)	
T102	E387 VAW	Aldeburgh	2021–		Atlantic 85-class Howard Bell (B-899)	
T103	E589 WAW	Pwllheli	1987–2001		–	
T103	E589 WAW	Scarborough	2001–2015		–	
T103	E589 WAW	Relief fleet	2015–2016		–	
T104	E269 YUJ	Newcastle	1988–1999		B-class (Atlantic 85); Marjorie Shepherd (B-928)	
T104	E269 YUJ	Relief fleet	1999–2001		B-class (Atlantic 85); Marjorie Shepherd (B-928)	
T104	88-LH-3977	Clogherhead	2001–2010		B-class (Atlantic 85); Marjorie Shepherd (B-928)	
T104	E269 YUJ	Relief fleet	2010–2012		B-class (Atlantic 85); Marjorie Shepherd (B-928)	
T104	E269 YUJ	Anstruther	2012–2016		B-class (Atlantic 85); Marjorie Shepherd (B-928)	
T104	E269 YUJ	Relief fleet	2016–2019		B-class (Atlantic 85); Marjorie Shepherd (B-928)	
T104	E269 YUJ	Filey	2019–		B-class (Atlantic 85); Marjorie Shepherd (B-928)	
T105	–	Clogherhead	1988–2001		–	Sold to Caldey Island to be used to tow a low water landing stage. Flooded in 2021, replaced with T117.
T105	E837 XNT	Relief fleet	2001–2002		–	Sold to Caldey Island to be used to tow a low water landing stage. Flooded in 2021, replaced with T117.
T105	FMN 664V	Ramsey	2002–2015		–	Sold to Caldey Island to be used to tow a low water landing stage. Flooded in 2021, replaced with T117.
T105	E837 XNT	Relief fleet	2015		–	Sold to Caldey Island to be used to tow a low water landing stage. Flooded in 2021, replaced with T117.
T106	F760 BUJ	Scarborough	1988–2001		MST Rescue 900 RIB; E-ON Spirit of Maryport	
T106	F760 BUJ	Relief fleet	2001–2003		MST Rescue 900 RIB; E-ON Spirit of Maryport	
T106	F760 BUJ	Filey	2003–2013		MST Rescue 900 RIB; E-ON Spirit of Maryport	
T106	F760 BUJ	Relief fleet	2013–2015		MST Rescue 900 RIB; E-ON Spirit of Maryport	
T106	F760 BUJ	Maryport Rescue (Ind)	2017–		MST Rescue 900 RIB; E-ON Spirit of Maryport	
T107	F415 EAW	Kilmore Quay	1989–2001		–	
T107	F415 EAW	Lytham St Annes	2001–2008		–	
T107	F415 EAW	Relief fleet	2008–2013		–	
T107	F415 EAW	Margate	2013–2024		–	
T107	F415 EAW	Storage	2024–		–	
T108	F133 FUJ	St Ives	1989–1997		–	
T108	F133 FUJ	Relief fleet	1997–1998		–	
T108	F133 FUJ	Bridlington	1998–2000		–	
T108	–	Kilmore Quay	2001–2003		–	
T108	F133 FUJ	Training (Instow)	2003–2006		–	
T108	F133 FUJ	Stored	2006–2007		–	
T108	F133 FUJ	Cromer	2007–2008		–	
T108	F133 FUJ	Relief fleet	2008–2009		–	
T108	F133 FUJ	Exmouth	2009–2014		–	
T108	F133 FUJ	Relief fleet	2014–2019		–	
T108	1222 MN	Peel	2019–2021		–	
T108	1222 MN	Ramsey	2021–2022		–	
T108	F133 FUJ	Relief fleet	2022		–	
T109	G296 KUX	Filey	1990–2003		–	
T109	G296 KUX	Margate	2003–2013		–	
T109	G296 KUX	Relief fleet	2013–2015		–	
T109	G296 KUX	Training	2015		–	
T109	G296 KUX	Relief fleet	2015–2016		–	
T110	–	Ramsey	1990–2002		–	
T110	G751 MNT	Anstruther	2003–2012		–	
T110	G751 MNT	Relief fleet	2012–2016		–	
T110	G751 MNT	Anstruther	2016–2024		–	
T110	G751 MNT	Relief fleet	2024–		–	
T111	H926 PUJ	Margate	1991–2003		Alicat 5m RIB; Fred Dyble II	
T111	H926 PUJ	Relief fleet	2003–2004		Alicat 5m RIB; Fred Dyble II	
T111	1222 MN	Peel	2004–2019		Alicat 5m RIB; Fred Dyble II	
T111	H926 PUJ	Caister (Ind)	2020–		Alicat 5m RIB; Fred Dyble II	
T112	H977 SNT	Anstruther	1991–2003		Ribcraft 6.4m-Pro RIB; The Freemason	
T112	H977 SNT	Relief fleet	2003–2017		Ribcraft 6.4m-Pro RIB; The Freemason	
T112	H977 SNT	Ferryside Lifeboat (Ind)	2017–		Ribcraft 6.4m-Pro RIB; The Freemason	
T113	J794 VUX	New Quay	1992–2001		–	
T113	J794 VUX	Relief fleet	2001–2003		–	
T113	J794 VUX	Filey	2003		–	
T113	J794 VUX	Relief fleet	2003–2006		–	
T113	J794 VUX	St Ives	2006–2015		–	
T113	J794 VUX	Relief fleet	2015–2016		–	
T113	J794 VUX	Training	2016–		–	
T114	1222 MN	Peel	1992–2004		–	Sold - now in private collection in Exmouth for restoration.
T114	J126 WUJ	Skegness	2005–2017		–	Sold - now in private collection in Exmouth for restoration.
T115	K499 AUX	Relief fleet	1993–2005		–	Sold - Currently in Aldeburgh launching Fishing Vessels.
T115	K499 AUX	Aldeburgh	2005–2021		–	Sold - Currently in Aldeburgh launching Fishing Vessels.
T116	K920 DUJ	Aldeburgh	1993–2005		B-class (Atlantic 75); Sea Weaver (ex B-762)	
T116	K920 DUJ	Dungeness	2005–2014		B-class (Atlantic 75); Sea Weaver (ex B-762)	
T116	K920 DUJ	Relief fleet	2014–2015		B-class (Atlantic 75); Sea Weaver (ex B-762)	
T116	K920 DUJ	Training	2015–2017		B-class (Atlantic 75); Sea Weaver (ex B-762)	
T116	K920 DUJ	Hemsby (Ind)	2021–		B-class (Atlantic 75); Sea Weaver (ex B-762)	
T117	L784 JNT	Relief fleet	1994–1995		–	Sold to Caldey Island to be used to tow a low water landing stage, replacing T105. Reported decommissioned in October 2025.
T117	L784 JNT	Skegness	1995–2005		–	Sold to Caldey Island to be used to tow a low water landing stage, replacing T105. Reported decommissioned in October 2025.
T117	L784 JNT	Relief fleet	2005–2006		–	Sold to Caldey Island to be used to tow a low water landing stage, replacing T105. Reported decommissioned in October 2025.
T117	L784 JNT	Seahouses	2006–2021		–	Sold to Caldey Island to be used to tow a low water landing stage, replacing T105. Reported decommissioned in October 2025.
T118	M224 SNT	St Ives	1997–2006		Ribcraft Pro-800 RIB; Wildlands	
T118	M224 SNT	Newcastle	2006–2022		Ribcraft Pro-800 RIB; Wildlands	
T118	M224 SNT	ESRA (Ind.)	2022–		Ribcraft Pro-800 RIB; Wildlands	
T119	N470 XAW	Newcastle	1999–2006		–	
T119	N470 XAW	Relief fleet	2006–2007		–	
T119	N470 XAW	Hastings	2007–2019		–	
T119	N470 XAW	Walmer	2019–2025		–	
T119	N470 XAW	Relief fleet	2025–		–	
T120	P514 HAW	Lytham	1999–2001		–	
T120	P514 HAW	Relief fleet	2001–2008		–	
T120	P514 HAW	Bridlington	2008–2017		–	
T120	P514 HAW	Relief fleet	2018–2022		–	
T120	P514 HAW	Newcastle	2022–2023		–	
T120	P514 HAW	Relief fleet	2023–2024		–	
T120	P514 HAW	Newcastle	2024–		–	
T121	DX04 YZG	Barmouth	1992–2019		–	
T121	DX04 YZG	Relief fleet	2019–2023		–	
T121	DX04 YZG	Newcastle	2023–2024		–	
T121	DX04 YZG	Storage	2024–		–	

== See also ==
- List of RNLI stations
- List of former RNLI stations
- Independent lifeboats in Britain and Ireland
- Fowler Challenger III launch tractor
- New Holland TC45 launch tractor
- Talus MB-764 launch tractor
- Talus MB-4H launch tractor
- Talus Atlantic 85 DO-DO launch carriage
