= Aberdovey Lifeboat Station =

RNLI Inshore lifeboat station in Gwynedd, Wales

- Gorsaf Bad Achub Aberdyfi

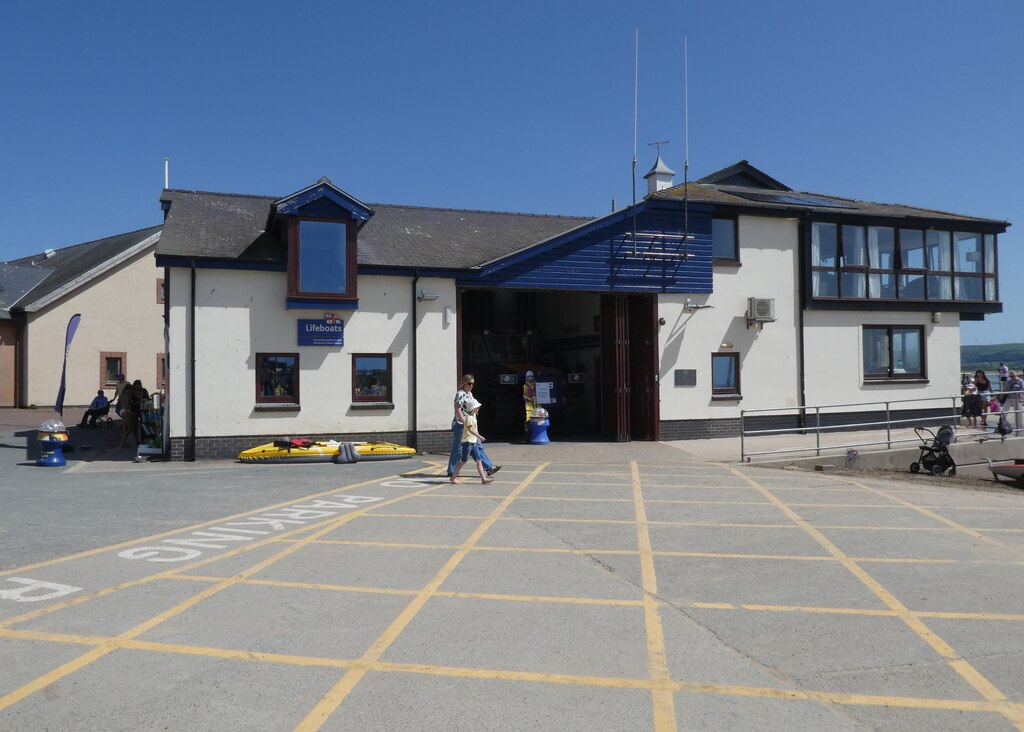
- Aberdovey Lifeboat Station in 2026

- Location within Gwynedd
- Alternative names: Aberdyfi Lifeboat Station

General information
- Type: RNLI Lifeboat Station
- Location: Glandovey Terrace,, Aberdovey, Gwynedd, Wales, LL35 0EB, UK
- Coordinates: 52°32′35″N 4°02′44″W
- Opened: Harbour Auth. 1837–1853; RNIPLS 1853–1854; RNLI 1854–1931; RNLI ILB 1963–present
- Owner: Royal National Lifeboat Institution

Website
- Aberdovey RNLI Lifeboat Station

Aberdovey Lifeboat Station (Welsh: Gorsaf Bad Achub Aberdyfi) is located in the coastal village of Aberdovey, on the north bank of the River Dyfi estuary, on Cardigan Bay, in the county of Gwynedd, West Wales.

A lifeboat was first placed at Aberdovey in 1837. Management of the station was transferred to the Royal National Institution for the Preservation of Life from Shipwreck (RNIPLS) in 1853, with the RNIPLS becoming the Royal National Lifeboat Institution (RNLI) in 1854.

Since 2016, the station has operated a B-class (Atlantic 85) Inshore lifeboat, RNLB Hugh Miles (B-896), launched by tractor.

This station is classed as an RNLI "Discover" lifeboat station, which welcomes visitors normally during the summer months.

== History ==
The first Aberdyfi lifeboat was placed on station in 1837, and managed by the Harbour Authority. Management of the station was transferred to the RNIPLS in 1853, which became the RNLI the following year.

However, it would be another four years before a new boathouse was constructed in 1858, ready for the arrival of a new 30-foot 'Pulling and Sailing' (P&S) lifeboat, one with sails and (6) oars, and its carriage, in 1859.

On 8 December 1862, crew member Owen Owen, aged 33, drowned when the lifeboat capsized whilst on exercise.

In February 1863, Honorary Secretary David Williams was awarded the RNLI Silver Medal, for putting out to the stranded brig Friends. His crew were voted £8 reward by the Institution. In September the same year the RNLI voted to reward the crew of the lifeboat £4-10s-0d, for the rescue of six crew of the stranded barque William Bromham.

A new larger 10-oared lifeboat was supplied to the station in 1865, after it was found that the 6-oared lifeboat wasn't ideal for the locality. The lifeboat was funded by a donation of £489-16s-8d, raised in Berkshire by Charles Stevens, Banker, and Capt. A. Butler, RN. After being displayed in Reading in September 1865, the boat was transported to Aberdovey free of charge by the Great Western and Cambrian railway companies, and following a procession to the river, was duly named Royal Berkshire.

In 1886, a building plot was bought for £150 and a new boathouse was constructed for £320.

There was a second tragedy in 1898 when crew member John Price, aged 72, lost his life trying to save people after a boating accident. His dependents were awarded £50 compensation by the RNLI's Committee of Management.

A slipway for the lifeboat was built in 1903, at a cost of £300, to enable the lifeboat to be launched into the river.

After operating for 94 years, Aberdovey Lifeboat Station was closed in 1931. The lifeboat on station at the time of closure, George and Margaret (ON 476), was sold from service.

== 1960s onwards ==
In 1963, in response to an increasing amount of water-based leisure activity, the RNLI began trials of small fast Inshore lifeboats, placed at various locations around the country. These were easily launched with just a few people, ideal to respond quickly to local emergencies. This quickly proved to be very successful. In 1963, there were 226 rescues or attempted rescues in the summer months, as a result of which 225 lives were saved.

Aberdovey Lifeboat Station was reopened in 1963 at the Outward Bound Sea School, as an Inshore lifeboat station, supplied with a D-class (RFD PB16) lifeboat. In 1974, the smaller D-class lifeboat was replaced by the larger twin-engined B-class (Atlantic 21) Inshore lifeboat.

A new boathouse was built in 1991 to house the Atlantic 21 and its launching tractor, a shop and crew facilities, and in 1995, an upper floor was built to provide a crew room, galley and store.

From 1998 to 2016, the station operated an Atlantic 75-class inshore lifeboat, RNLB Sandwell Lifeline (B-758), launched by tractor, and making an average of 25 emergency launches a year. She replaced B-559, which was transferred to the British Virgin Islands as a rescue craft.

In 2016, the B-class (Atlantic 85) Inshore lifeboat Hugh Miles (B-896) replaced Sandwell Lifeline. The lifeboat was funded from the legacy of Joan Miles, in memory of her late son.

== Station honours ==
A number of awards have been made to recognise exemplary service:

- RNLI Silver Medal
  For the rescue of the crew of the brig Friends of Newport on 8 February 1863
  Mr David Williams, of HM Customs, Honorary Secretary – 1863
- RNLI Bronze Medal
  For the rescue of four from the cabin cruiser Lady Jane on 10 August 1974
  David William Williams, crew member – 1974
- 'The Thanks of the Institution inscribed on Vellum'
  For the rescue of four from the cabin cruiser Lady Jane on 10 August 1974
  Anthony Mills, Helm – 1974
  Andrew Coghill, crew member – 1974
- 'A Framed Letter of Thanks signed by the Chairman of the Institution'
  For his valuable services as a member of the crew from 1920 to 1931
  Mr Ellis Williams, Bowman – 1972
- Member, Order of the British Empire (MBE)
  David Eilian Williams – 2014QBH

== Roll of honour ==
In memory of those lost whilst serving at Aberdovey:

- Lost when the lifeboat capsized on exercise, 8 December 1862
  Owen Owen, crew member (33)
- Died during a rescue after a boating accident, 1898
  John Price, crew member (72)

== Aberdovey lifeboats ==
=== Pulling and Sailing (P&S) lifeboats ===
ON (Note: ON is the RNLI's Official Number of the boat.)	Name	Built	On station	Class	Comments
Pre-178	Victoria	1837	1837–1859	26-foot Palmer	(Note: 26 ft 0 in (7.92 m) x 6 ft 0 in (1.83 m) (6-oared) Palmer-class lifeboat, funded by the RNIPLS, built by Taylor of Blackwall, London, costing £68. Altered to 26 ft 9 in (8.15 m) x 6 ft 3 in (1.91 m) in 1855.); Condemned in 1859.
Pre-344	Unnamed	1859	1859–1865	30-foot Peake self-righting (P&S)	(Note: 30 ft 0 in (9.14 m) x 6 ft 3 in (1.91 m) (6-oared) Peake-class self-righting (P&S) lifeboat, built by Forrestt of Limehouse, London, costing £147.); Capsized 8 December 1862, and ultimately proved unsuitable. Sold in 1865.
Pre-440	Royal Berkshire	1865	1865–1886	32-foot Prowse self-righting (P&S)	(Note: 32 ft 0 in (9.75 m) x 7 ft 5 in (2.26 m) (10-oared) Prowse-class self-righting (P&S) lifeboat, funded by the collections of Mr C. Stephens and Capt. Butler, RN, built by Forrestt of Limehouse, London, costing £252.); Broken up in 1886.
63	Thomas Niccolls Stratford	1886	1886–1904	34-foot self-righting (P&S)	(Note: 34 ft 0 in (10.36 m) x 8 ft 0 in (2.44 m) (10-oared) self-righting (P&S) lifeboat, legacy of Mr T. N. Stratford of Worcester, built by Woolfe of Shadwell, London, costing £336.); Broken up in 1904.
534	William Brocksopp	1904	1904–1921	35-foot self-righting (P&S)	(Note: 35 ft 0 in (10.67 m) x 8 ft 6 in (2.59 m) (10-oared) self-righting (P&S) lifeboat, legacy of Mr W. Brocksopp of Holloway, built by Thames Ironworks of Blackwall, London, costing £865.); Condemned in 1921, and sold in 1922.
476	George and Margaret	1901	1921–1931	35-foot self-righting (P&S)	(Note: 35-foot x 8-foot 6in (10-oared) self-righting (P&S) lifeboat, legacy of Mr G. Levy of Wood Green, built by Thames Ironworks of Blackwall, London, costing £834 when new.); Previous at Isle of Whithorn. Sold in 1931.

Station Closed in 1931
Pre ON numbers are unofficial numbers used by the Lifeboat Enthusiasts' Society to reference early lifeboats not included on the official RNLI list.

=== Inshore lifeboats ===
==== D-class ====
Op.No. (Note: Op. No. is the RNLI's Operational Number of the boat carried on the hull.)	Name	On station	Class	Comments
D-12	Unnamed	1963–1964	D-class (RFD PB16)	
D-10	Unnamed	1965	D-class (RFD PB16)	
D-19	Unnamed	1965–1967	D-class (RFD PB16)	
D-138	Unnamed	1967	D-class (RFD PB16)	
D-161	Unnamed	1968–1969	D-class (RFD PB16)	
D-140	Unnamed	1969–1970	D-class (RFD PB16)	
D-19	Unnamed	1970	D-class (RFD PB16)	
D-46	Unnamed	1970	D-class (RFD PB16)	
D-110	Unnamed	1970	D-class (RFD PB16)	
D-140	Unnamed	1971–1974	D-class (RFD PB16)	

==== B-class ====
Op.No.	Name	On station	Class	Comments
B-514	Guide Friendship I	1974–1983	B-class (Atlantic 21)	
B-559	Long Life III	1983–1999	B-class (Atlantic 21)	
B-758	Sandwell Lifeline	1999–2016	B-class (Atlantic 75)	
B-896	Hugh Miles	2016–	B-class (Atlantic 85)	

=== Launch and recovery tractors ===
Op.No.	Reg. No.	Type	On station	Comments
T76	BGO 680B	Case 1000D	1989–1991	
TW16	H610 SUJ	Talus MB-4H Hydrostatic (Mk 1.5)	1991–1993	
T85	SEL 394R	Talus MBC Case 1150C	1993–1995	
T88	WEL 301S	Talus MBC Case 1150C	1995–1999	
T90	UJT 491X	Talus MBC Case 1150C	1999–2013	
T97	C282 LNT	Talus MB-H Crawler	2014–	

== See also ==
- List of RNLI stations
- List of former RNLI stations
- Royal National Lifeboat Institution lifeboats
- Talus Atlantic 85 DO-DO launch carriage
