= Dornoch Firth and Embo Lifeboat Station =

Former RNLI lifeboat station in Highland, Scotland

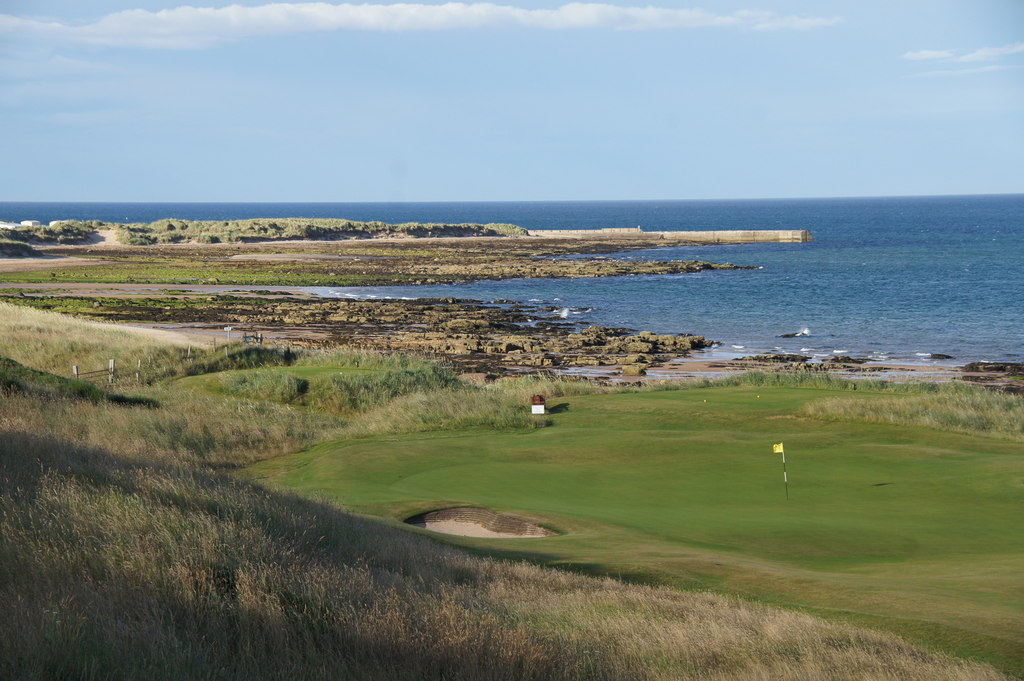
- Former location of Dornoch Firth and Embo Lifeboat Station

- Embo, Highland

General information
- Status: Closed
- Location: Embo, Highland, Scotland
- Coordinates: 57°54′06.1″N 4°00′04.3″W
- Opened: 29 September 1886
- Closed: 1904

Dornoch Firth and Embo Lifeboat Station was located between the town and former royal burgh of Dornoch, and the village of Embo, overlooking the Outer Dornoch Firth, approximately 45 miles (72 km) north of Inverness, in the administrative region of Highland, historically Sutherland, on the east coast of Scotland.

A lifeboat station was first established here in 1886, by the Royal National Lifeboat Institution (RNLI).

After just 18 years of operation, Dornoch Firth and Embo Lifeboat Station was closed in 1904.

== History ==
On the application from local residents in January 1886, following a local shipwreck in the previous month, and several beforehand, and following the visit and report by the Chief Inspector of Lifeboats, at a meeting of the RNLI committee of management on Thursday 1 July 1886, it was decided to establish a lifeboat station at Dornoch Firth, Sutherlandshire, to arrive in the latter part of September, "in readiness to meet any shipping casualties that might occur on the arrival of the equinoctial gales".

Funding had been received by the Institution from an anonymous donor, "D.", for the establishment of a new lifeboat station, with the request that the new lifeboat be named Daisie.

On 29 September 1886, over 100 fishermen assembled at Dornoch railway station, to assist in the unloading of the new lifeboat and carriage which had arrived by rail. Under the supervision of RNLI District Inspector Lt. Beddoes, RN, the new 34-foot self-righting 'Pulling and Sailing' (P&S) lifeboat, one with sails and (10) oars, was set upon its carriage. From there, the boat was pulled by a team of six horses, through an archway with the banner "Welcome Daisie", into the town of Dornoch, which was bedecked with flags, on the cathedral, the castle, the court-house, and other buildings.

After the formal handover to the local committee, the lifeboat, which cost £297, was officially named Daisie (ON 89) by Miss Sutherland of Skibo, after which it was launched for a public demonstration, before being rowed 2 miles (3.2 km) north, to its new home near Embo, where a boathouse was constructed a short time afterwards, at a cost of £118.

In heavy snowfall, Daisie was launched on the evening of 20 January 1890, to an open fishing boat Come On, stranded on a bank at Littleferry with six crew aboard. The boat re-floated as the lifeboat arrived, but was carried to another stony bank, and was in danger of being wrecked. With the assistance of the lifeboat crew, the vessel was brought from danger, and then with two lifeboatmen aboard, was piloted to port, the crew being unfamiliar with the area.

Following a visit to the station by the deputy chief inspector of lifeboats, and the subsequent report, it was resolved at a meeting of the RNLI committee of management on 14 July 1904, to close Dornoch Firth and Embo Lifeboat Station.

Nothing now remains of the boathouse, which stood on the shore to the south of Embo. The lifeboat on station at the time of closure, Daisie (ON 89), the only lifeboat to have been stationed at Dornoch Firth and Embo Lifeboat Station, is recorded as sold in 1905 to Southend-on-Sea. No further information is available.

== Dornoch Firth and Embo lifeboat ==
ON (Note: ON is the RNLI's Official Number of the boat.)	Name	Built	On station	Class	Comments
89	Daisie	1886	1886–1904	34-foot Self-righting (P&S)	(Note: 34-foot x 7-foot 6in (10-oared) self-righting (P&S) lifeboat, anonymous gift of 'D', built by Forrestt of Limehouse, London, costing £297)

Station closed in 1904

== See also ==
- List of RNLI stations
- List of former RNLI stations
- Royal National Lifeboat Institution lifeboats
