= Maritime Rescue Institute =

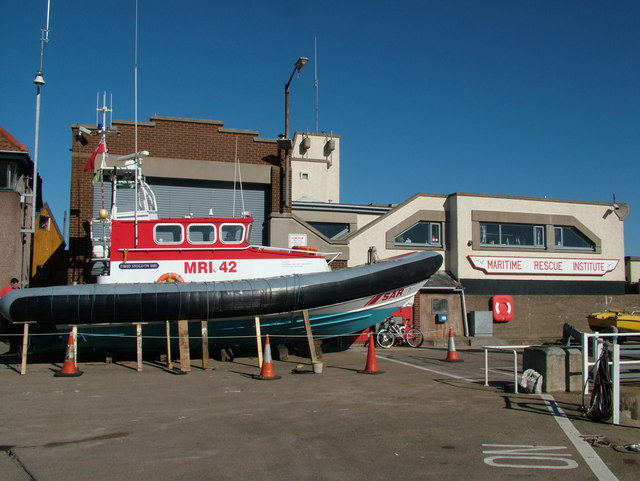
- MRI vessel 42, an adapted Medina-class lifeboat at Stonehaven
- Formation: 2003
- Dissolved: 2013
- Location: Stonehaven

The Maritime Rescue Institute was a Scottish charity based in Stonehaven. It provided Kincardineshire's local lifeboat service and provided specialist training programmes and advisory services on all forms of waterborne emergency response. It was established as a charity in 2003 using the proceeds of the sale from its predecessor commercial training organisation. The BBC announced its closure in February 2013 following damage sustained during the December 2012 storms. Following the demise of MRI, Royal National Lifeboat Institution started providing lifeboat services in Stonehaven and established a new premises in 2014.
