= Medina-class lifeboat =

Former RNLI lifeboat class

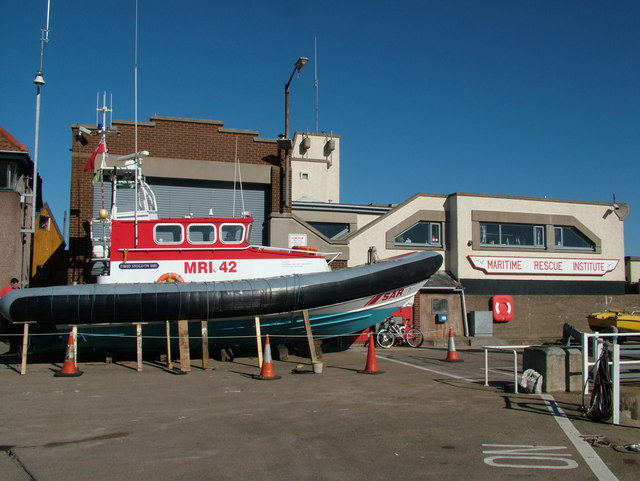
- David Stogden MBE (MRI 42), originally Unnamed RNLB ON 1091

Class overview
- Builders: W. A Souter and Sons, Cowes; William Osborne, Littlehampton
- Operators: Royal National Lifeboat Institution
- Built: 1980–1983
- Completed: 3
- Retired: 3

General characteristics
- Length: 39 ft 6 in (12.04 m)
- Beam: 14 ft 3 in (4.34 m)
- Propulsion: various
- Speed: 28 knots (32 mph; 52 km/h)
- Range: 150Nm (6 hours at full speed)
- Complement: 4

The Medina-class lifeboat was a prototype Rigid Inflatable Boat that was designed and evaluated by the Royal National Lifeboat Institution of the United Kingdom and Ireland in the 1980s. It was based on the design of the Atlantic 21-class lifeboat.

== History ==
Following on from the successful introduction of the B-class (Atlantic 21) Inshore lifeboat, the RNLI began to investigate the introduction of an intermediate lifeboat, bridging the gap between the All-weather Offshore lifeboats, and the Inshore B-class and D-class lifeboats.

The 'Medina 35' prototype lifeboat was designed by RNLI staff, and launched in the autumn of 1979, making an appearance at the London Boat Show in January 1980. At the time, it was the largest Rigid Inflatable Boat produced. The prototype had been developed by the Institution's 'Cowes Base' design team on the Isle of Wight, under the leadership of David Stogdon, MBE, and was built by W. A. Souter and Son Ltd.

As Governor and Lord Lieutenant of the Isle of Wight, Admiral of the Fleet Earl Mountbatten of Burma had taken a keen interest in the new lifeboat, and welcomed the proposal to name the boat after him. As Patron of the Romsey branch of the RNLI, he had approved their plans for an appeal for funds, which opened just a week before he fell victim to an IRA bomb on 27 August 1979. Many chose to honour his memory by donating to the fund, which reached £60,000 after just three months.

== Design and Construction ==
The Medina 35 was a development of the B-class (Atlantic 21) Inshore lifeboat. The hull was extended to 10.52 m (34 ft 6 in) from 7.21 m (23 ft 8 in), with the rear 2.7 m (8 ft 10 in) being a flat bottom, rather than the V-shaped bow. This provided better stability, and allowed the boat to stay upright when beached.

Instead of twin outboard engines, twin inboard Sabre 212-hp diesel engines were installed, each powering a Sternpowr 83 outdrive water-jet unit, providing 26 knots. The engines, already water-tight, were housed in a water-tight aluminium housing, and could continue to operate if capsized.

The Avon manufactured sponson was made of 11 oz (310 g) hypalon/neoprene fabric, the 31 in (790 mm) diameter tubes tapered down to 25 in (640 mm) at the bow, in order not to obstruct forward vision. A radar scanner, donated by Decca as the 100th supplied to the RNLI, with a strengthened radome, and VHF aerial, were fitted to a rear gantry, along with navigation and blue lights, with the boat fitted with a Seafarer III echo sounder and Pye Beaver VHF radio.

== Cancellation ==
After the production of two further boats in 1982 and 1983, evaluation trials continued for a further 5 years. In 1988, it was announced that the Medina-class lifeboat would not be entering service with the RNLI. "This 35ft development of the Atlantic 21 'rigid inflatable' principle showed considerable promise but it did not prove possible to achieve the very high standards of all-weather operational performance and reliability demanded of all RNLI lifeboats."

The last of the three Medina-class boats, ON 1091 (Unnamed), was sold in 1989. In 2003, it was acquired by Maritime Rescue Institute at Stonehaven, and operated as a rescue boat for 10 years. It was named David Stogden, MBE (MRI-42) after the designer.

== David Stogden ==
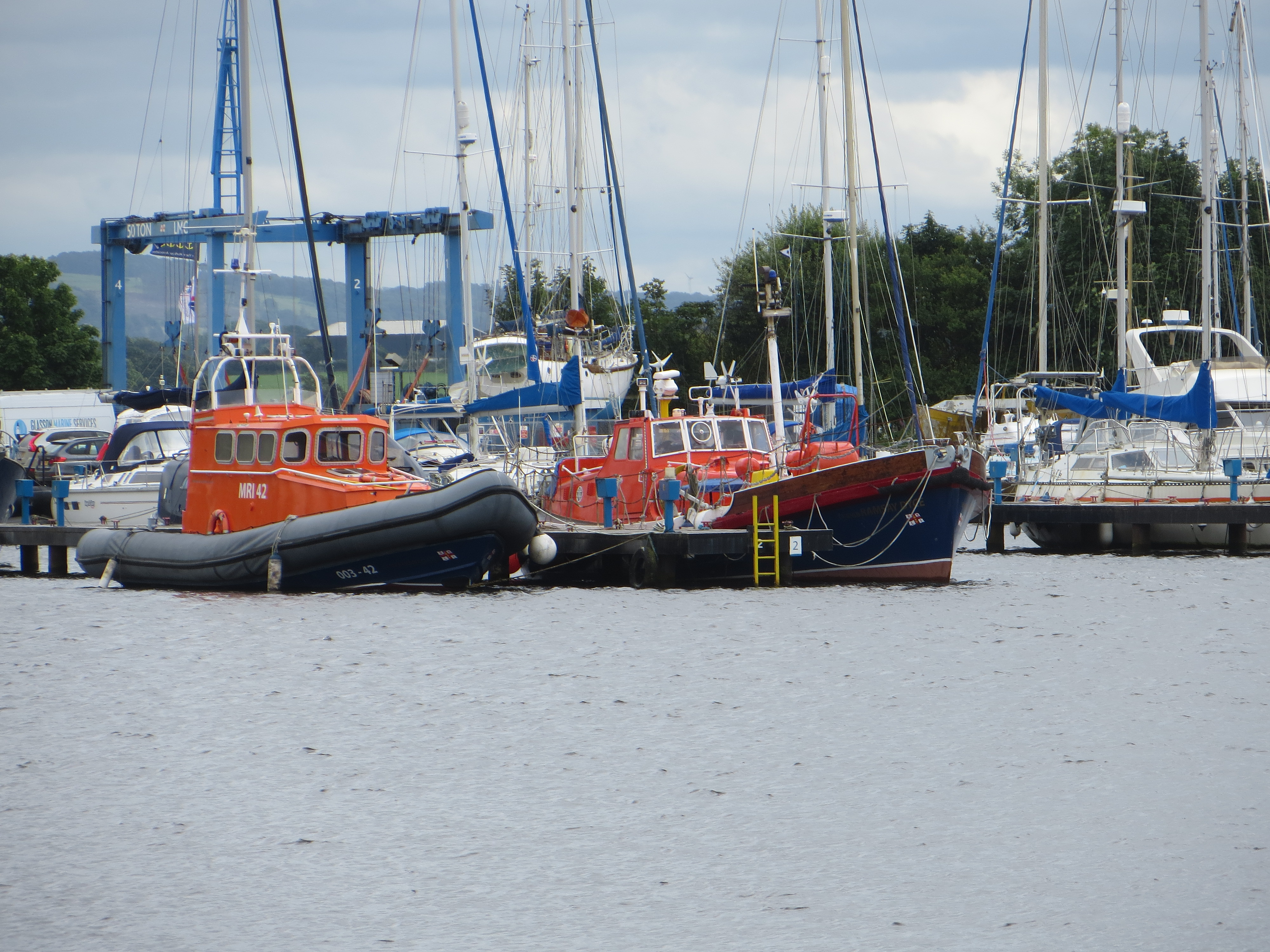
Medina-class lifeboat MRI42 (and Barnett-class lifeboat Ramsay Dyce) at Glasson Dock

Edgar David Stogden, MBE (1919–2008) was neither a naval architect, nor a lifeboatman, but his work came to see him recognised as one of the great lifeboat designers. Stogden served with the Royal Naval Volunteer Reserve during World War II, later joining the RNLI in 1952 as an Inspector. The loss of the Fraserburgh and Arbroath lifeboats and crew in the early 1950s prompted his desire to develop faster, more efficient boats, that would protect their crew members if capsized.

A serious car accident in 1964 brought about a desk-job, and he was made superintendent of the RNLI's inshore fleet programme at Cowes. Many of his ideas were incorporated on the Institutions Inshore lifeboats, and he was instrumental in the development of the Medina-class water-jet powered boats.

Whilst the Medina-class was ultimately not adopted by the RNLI, his retirement from the Institution brought about a new opportunity with the Dutch Lifeboat Service KNRM. The concept of the Medina-class, with its water-jet propulsion and shallow draft, was much more suited to the Netherlands coast, and working with Dutch naval architects, and testing each prototype at sea, Stogdon helped to perfect the KNRM lifeboats in use today. In 2004, CVLS 37-01 Bernard Matthews II at Caister Volunteer Lifeboat Service, was the first of his later designs to enter lifeboat service in the UK.

For his work, Stogden was awarded the MBE in 1978.

== Fleet ==
ON (Note: ON is the RNLI's Official Number of the boat.)	Name	Built	Trialled at	Engines	Comments
1069	Mountbatten of Burma	1979	Brighton	2 x 212-hp Sabre diesel	(Note: Medina-class lifeboat, built by W. A. Souter and sons of Cowes.) Sold 1989. Renamed Swanage Diver, later Demelza. Re-engined with twin 300-hp Perkins Engines. Last reported as a workboat at Salcombe, May 2022.
1069	Mountbatten of Burma	1979	Littlehampton	2 x 212-hp Sabre diesel	Sold 1989. Renamed Swanage Diver, later Demelza. Re-engined with twin 300-hp Perkins Engines. Last reported as a workboat at Salcombe, May 2022.
1072	Countess Mountbatten of Burma	1981	Redcar	2 x Volvo 60B diesel	(Note: Medina-class lifeboat, built by W. A. Souter and sons of Cowes.) Sold 1989. Renamed Cheetah, later Discovery. Under restoration at Penicuik, June 2023.
1072	Countess Mountbatten of Burma	1981	Blackpool	2 x Volvo 60B diesel	Sold 1989. Renamed Cheetah, later Discovery. Under restoration at Penicuik, June 2023.
1072	Countess Mountbatten of Burma	1981	Dungeness	2 x Volvo 60B diesel	Sold 1989. Renamed Cheetah, later Discovery. Under restoration at Penicuik, June 2023.
1091	Unnamed	1984	RNLI HQ, Poole	2 x 285-hp Caterpillar 3208 diesel	(Note: Medina-class lifeboat, built by William Osborne of Littlehampton.) Sold 1989. Renamed Fury III, later Mountbatten Venturer. Acquired 2003 by the Maritime Rescue Institute, See below:–

== Maritime Rescue Institute ==
RNLI ON (Note: ON is the RNLI's Official Number of the boat.)	Name	Built	In service	Station	Comments
1091	David Stogden MBE; MRI-42	1984	2003–2013	Stonehaven	Sold 2013. Renamed ex-RNLB Medina-class 003-42, workboat at Glasson Dock, Lancashire, August 2025.

== See also ==
- Royal National Lifeboat Institution lifeboats
