= Anstruther Lifeboat Station =

RNLI lifeboat station in Fife, Scotland

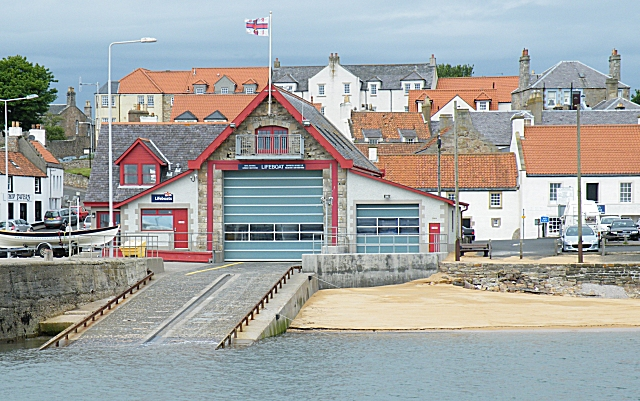
- Anstruther Lifeboat Station

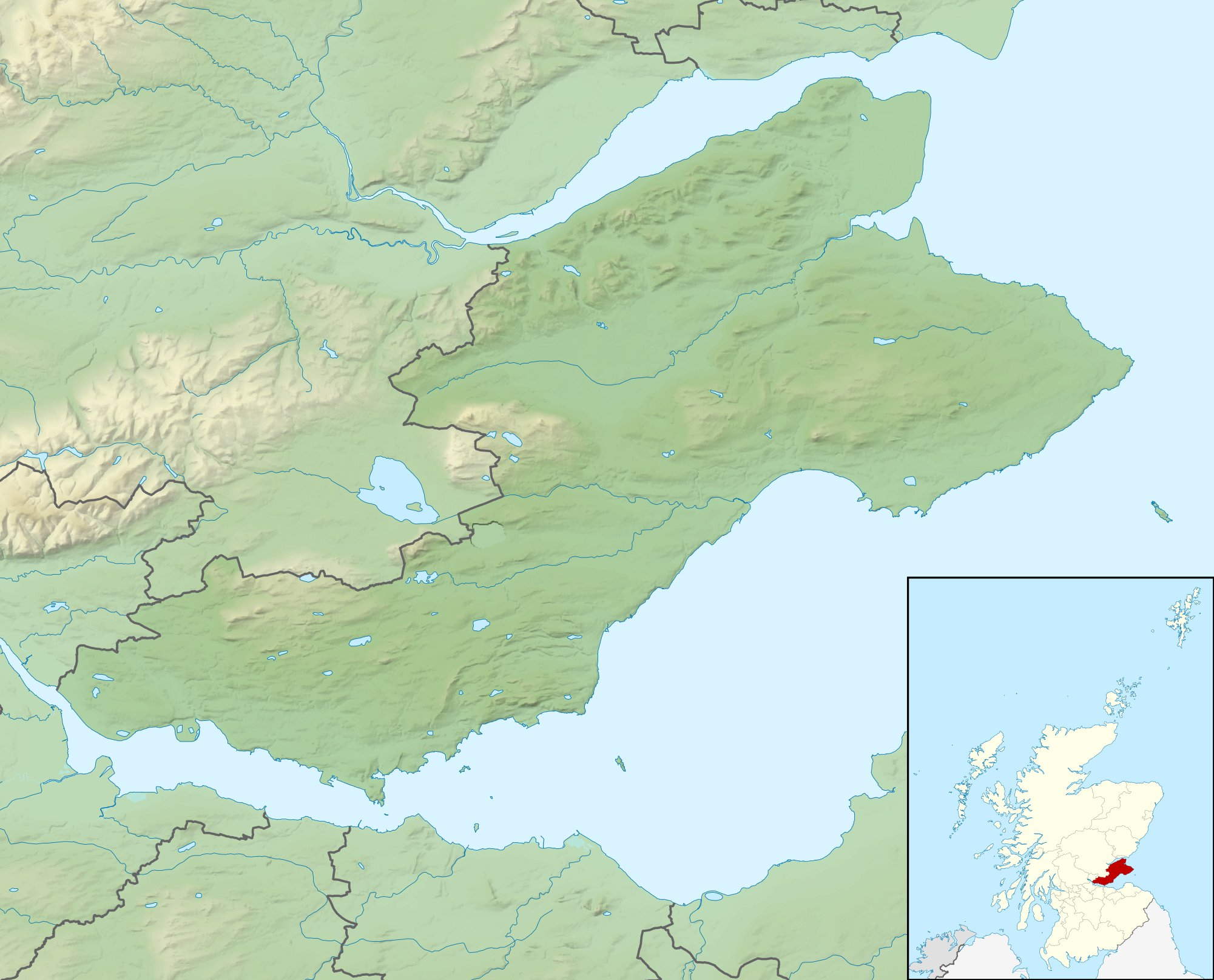
- Location within Fife

General information
- Type: RNLI Lifeboat Station
- Location: Middle Pier, Anstruther, Fife, KY10 3AB, Scotland
- Coordinates: 56°13′17.4″N 2°41′50.4″W
- Opened: 1865
- Owner: Royal National Lifeboat Institution

Website
- Anstruther RNLI Lifeboat Station

Anstruther Lifeboat Station operates from Middle Pier at Anstruther, a harbour town on the north shore of the Firth of Forth, approximately 9 miles (14 km) south-east of St Andrews, on the Fife peninsula, on the east coast of Scotland.

A lifeboat station was established in Anstruther by the Royal National Lifeboat Institution (RNLI) in 1865.

The station currently operates the All-weather Shannon-class lifeboat 13-47 Robert and Catherine Steen (ON 1354), on station since 2024, and the D-class (IB1) Inshore lifeboat Akira (D-802), on station since 2016.

== History ==
Ever since its founding in 1824, the Royal National Institution for the Preservation of Life from Shipwreck (RNIPLS), later to become the RNLI in 1854, would award medals for deeds of gallantry at sea, even if no lifeboats were involved. Between 1832 and 1834, Five medals for gallantry were awarded on three occasions in the Anstruther area.

In 1834, the RNIPLS Gold Medal (Second-Service Gold lifeboat) was awarded to Lt. Henry Randall, RN, and a RNIPLS Silver Medal (Second-Service Silver lifeboat) to Chief Boatman Kenneth McCulloch, for the rescue of seven crew off the schooner Wanderer, when it was wrecked at Elie in a storm in 1833.

Randall had previously been awarded a gold medal for a rescue off Aberdeen in 1825, and Kenneth McCulloch was awarded the RNIPLS Silver Medal for saving the three crew of the sloop Vine when it was wrecked at Elie harbour on the 6 March 1832.

Silver medals were also awarded to two other coastguards, A. Murray and J. Mason, for saving the five crew of the schooner John, when it got into trouble during bad weather in December 1833.

On Thursday 1 June 1865, following his visit to the town, the deputy Inspector of Lifeboats recommended to the RNLI committee of management, that a lifeboat station be established at Anstruther.

A 32 ft (9.8 m) self-righting 'Pulling and Sailing' lifeboat, on with sails and (10) oars, was dispatched to the town. The lifeboat arrived on 18 November 1865, with the day being declared a local holiday. Having been conveyed to the town free of charge by the various railway companies, the lifeboat was drawn in procession through the town on its carriage to West Beach.

The Institution has just founded a life-boat station at Anstruther, on the coast of Fifeshire, where the fishermen were very anxious to have a life-boat for service to shipwrecked vessels, as well as to fishing-boats, which might be overtaken by storms, and, in running for shelter, might get blown to leeward of the pier, and be wrecked.

— The Life-boat, Vol. VI, Issue 59, 1 January 1866

The entire cost of the station had been funded by the gift of £600 (equivalent to £65,179 in 2025) from Miss H. Harvie of Cheltenham, along with a donation of £60 from local fishermen. She requested that the lifeboat be named in memory of the pioneering meteorologist Vice-Admiral Robert FitzRoy FRS (5 July 1805 – 30 April 1865). After a service of dedication by Rev. A. Gregory, the lifeboat was named Admiral Fitzroy.

In 1892, the RNLI inspector found there was no need to employ a paid bowman for the lifeboat, as the station at that time had six volunteer coxswains and a full crew to staff it, although by 1899, the number of coxswains had reduced to four. Up until 1897, the station had used a mortar to alert the volunteer crew, but this was deemed too dangerous to vessels in the harbour, so a handbell was used from that point on. A new lifeboat house was constructed on Middle Pier in 1904, costing over £1,600. Around this time, a new Coxswain Superintendent was appointed to replace the numerous coxswains, who has operated the station before on a rotating basis.

24 years after the first purpose-built motor-powered lifeboat was first placed at Stromness, Anstruther were assigned their first motor lifeboat. The 35 ft 6 in (10.82 m) Liverpool-class lifeboat Nellie and Charlie (ON 764) was funded from the legacy of Mr Neil Robertson of Pitlochry, and was constructed by J. Samuel White of Cowes. 7000 people attended the service of dedication and naming ceremony on 21 July 1933. Nellie and Charlie served at Anstruther for 17 years, launching 54 times, and saving 72 lives.

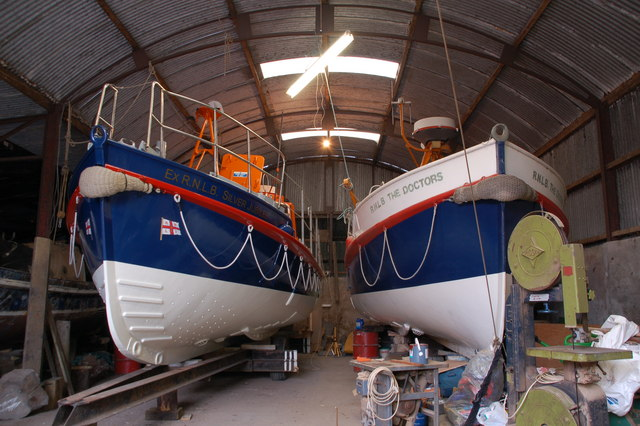
Former Oakley-class lifeboat The Doctors (ON 983) (right) under restoration in 2007

In 1965, a new Oakley-class lifeboat was sent to the station. It was named The Doctors (ON 983) in a ceremony by Princess Alice in memory of the family of Dr Nora Allan, who had gifted the cost of the lifeboat. At this time the station was re-adapted for the new lifeboat, a trailer and tractor.

The Doctors was withdrawn from the station after 26 years, and replaced by the Mersey-class lifeboat 12-17 Kingdom of Fife (ON 1174) in 1991. At this time the slipway was refurbished and the boathouse extended and modernised. Further modifications were made to the boathouse in 1995 with a two-storey extension, providing new crew facilities.

In order to provide a faster local response, the D-class (EA16) Inshore lifeboat Global Marine (D-552) was placed on service in 2003, for a 12-month trial period. A D-class Inshore lifeboat remains on service at Anstruther to this day.

The station was again upgraded in 2009, at a cost of £273,000, to provide permanent housing for the D-class (IB1) Inshore Lifeboat The Rotary Centenary Queen (D-667).

Volunteer lifeboat helm Barry Gourlay, a mechanical engineer, received the RNLI Bronze Medal in 2013, and volunteer crew members fisherman Euan Hoggan and PhD student Rebecca Jewell were accorded the "Thanks of the Institute inscribed on Vellum", for the rescue of two people in difficult sea conditions. MV Princess had run onto rocks near Crail in the early hours and was breaking up in a force 5 winds, heavy rain and a 3 metres (9.8 ft) swell. The volunteer crew used the Inshore lifeboat, later transferring the casualties to Kingdom of Fife. The RNLI stated in the award ceremony in London that the volunteer had "undoubtedly" save the lives of the stricken crew.

2016 saw the arrival of a replacement D-class (IB1) Inshore Lifeboat Akira (D-802).

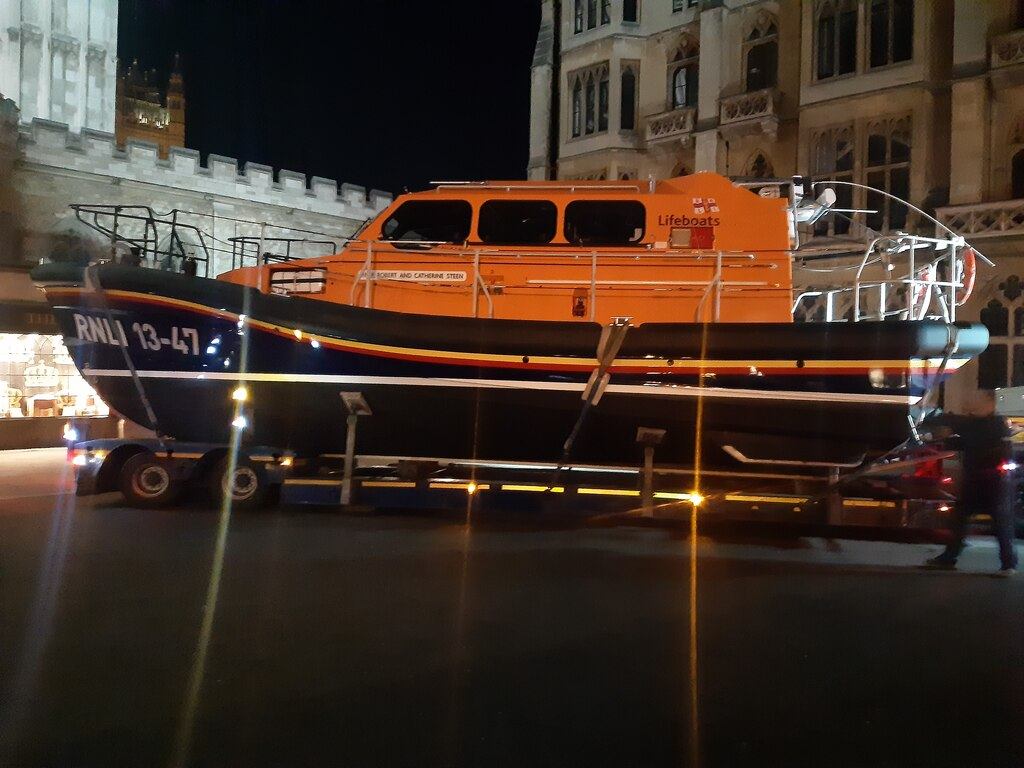
Shannon-class lifeboat 13-47 Robert and Catherine Steen (ON 1354), on display at Westminster Abbey, for the RNLI 200 service

In 2019 it was announced that the RNLI planned to build a purpose-built new facility further along the shoreline that will be capable of housing a Shannon-class lifeboat. The Anstruther crew featured on a BBC documentary Saving Lives At Sea in 2019.

In March 2024, prior to service, the new Anstruther Shannon-class lifeboat, 13-47 Robert and Catherine Steen (ON 1354), was placed on display at Westminster Abbey for the RNLI 200 anniversary service. She was later transported to Anstruther, and was declared operational at 10:00 on 27 August 2024.

13-47 Robert and Catherine Steen (ON 1354) is one of the RNLI's "Launch-a-Memory" lifeboats. To assist with the cost of the lifeboat, 10,000 supporters were asked to pledge a donation, in return for their designated name being placed within the numbers on the lifeboat.

== Station honours ==
The following are awards made at Anstruther:

- RNIPLS Gold Medal
  For saving seven lives of the schooner Wanderer, 2 February 1833
  Lt. Henry E. Randall, RN, H.M. Coastguard, Elie – 1834 (Second-Service Gold Lifeboat)
- RNIPLS Silver Medal
  For saving three lives of the sloop Vine, 6 March 1832
  Kenneth McCulloch, Chief Boatman, H.M. Coastguard, Elie – 1832
  For saving seven lives of the schooner Wanderer, 2 February 1833
  Kenneth McCulloch, Chief Boatman, H.M. Coastguard, Elie – 1834 (Second-Service Silver Lifeboat)
  For saving five lives of the schooner John, 3 December 1833
  Andrew Murray, Boatman, H.M. Coastguard, Elie – 1834
  John Mason, Boatman, H.M. Coastguard, Elie – 1834
- RNLI Bronze Medal
  For saving two lives of the motor vessel Princess, 1 August 2012
  Barry A. L. Gourlay, Helm – 2013
- 'The Thanks of the Institute inscribed on Vellum'
  For saving two lives of the motor vessel Princess, 1 August 2012
  Euan Hoggan, Crew Member – 2013
  Rebecca Jewell, Crew Member – 2013
- Member, Order of the British Empire (MBE)
  For services to the Institution
  John Salter Murray (former Coxswain) – 2007QBH

== Anstruther lifeboats ==
=== Pulling and Sailing (P&S) lifeboats ===
ON (Note: ON is the RNLI's Official Number of the boat.)	Name	Built	On station	Class	Launches/ Lives Saved	Comments
Pre-443	Admiral Fitzroy	1865	1865–1888	32-foot Prowse self-righting (P&S)	13 / 18	(Note: 32 ft 0 in (9.75 m) x 7 ft 5 in (2.26 m) (10-oared) Prowse-class self-righting (P&S) lifeboat, gift of Miss H. Harvie of Cheltenham, built by Forrestt of Limehouse, London, costing £252.); Condemned and sold for £6 in 1888.
164	Royal Stuart	1888	1888–1904	34-foot self-righting (P&S)	5 / 0	(Note: 34 ft 0 in (10.36 m) x 8 ft 0 in (2.44 m) (10-oared) self-righting (P&S) lifeboat, legacy of Mrs Atherton Howard of Cheltenham, built by Woolfe of Shadwell, London, costing £377.); Condemned in 1904, and broken up in 1905.
521	James and Mary Walker	1904	1904–1933	38-foot Watson (P&S)	15 / 46	(Note: 38 ft 0 in (11.58 m) x 9 ft 4 in (2.84 m) (12-oared) non-self-righting (P&S) lifeboat, legacy of Mrs M. A. Walker of West Calder, built by Thames Ironworks, costing £1,018.); Sold in 1933. Renamed Cameronian, later Ishbara. Under restoration as James and Mary Walker for display in Anstruther.

Pre ON numbers are unofficial numbers used by the Lifeboat Enthusiasts' Society to reference early lifeboats not included on the official RNLI list.

=== Motor lifeboats ===
ON	Op.No. (Note: Op.No. is the RNLI's Operational Number of the boat carried on the hull.)	Name	Built	On station	Class	Launches/ Lives Saved	Comments
764	–	Nellie and Charlie	1933	1933–1950	Liverpool	54 / 72	
876	–	James and Ruby Jackson	1950	1950–1965	Liverpool	63 / 45	
983	37-16	The Doctors	1965	1965–1991	Oakley	79 / 23	
1174	12-17	Kingdom of Fife	1991	1991–2024	Mersey	152 / 50 (–2014)	
1354	13-47	Robert and Catherine Steen	2023	2024–	Shannon		

More post-service details can be found on the respective lifeboat class pages.

=== Inshore lifeboats ===
Op.No.	Name	On station	Class	Comments
D-552	Global Marine	2003–2004	D-class (EA16)	12 month evaluation
D-500	Unnamed	2004–2005	D-class (EA16)	
D-461	Spirit of RAOC	2005–2006	D-class (EA16)	
D-667	The Rotary Centenary Queen	2006–2016	D-class (IB1)	
D-802	Akira	2016–	D-class (IB1)	

=== Launch and recovery tractors ===
Op.No.	Reg. No.	Type	On station	Comments
T15	FU 4892	Clayton	1933–1949	
T47	KGP 2	Case LA	1949–1959	
T44	KGJ 57	Case LA	1959–1965	
T81	DLB 483C	Case 1000D	1965–1977	
T79	DLB 481C	Case 1000D	1977–1985	
T81	DLB 483C	Case 1000D	1985–1991	
T112	H977 SNT	Talus MB-H Crawler	1991–2003	
T110	G751 MNT	Talus MB-H Crawler	2003–2012	
T104	E269 YUJ	Talus MB-H Crawler	2012–2016	
T110	G751 MNT	Talus MB-H Crawler	2016–2024	
SC-T29	HF73 BXN	SLARS (Clayton)	2024–	

== See also ==
- List of RNLI stations
- List of former RNLI stations
- Royal National Lifeboat Institution lifeboats
