= Douglas Lifeboat Station =

RNLI lifeboat station on the Isle of Man

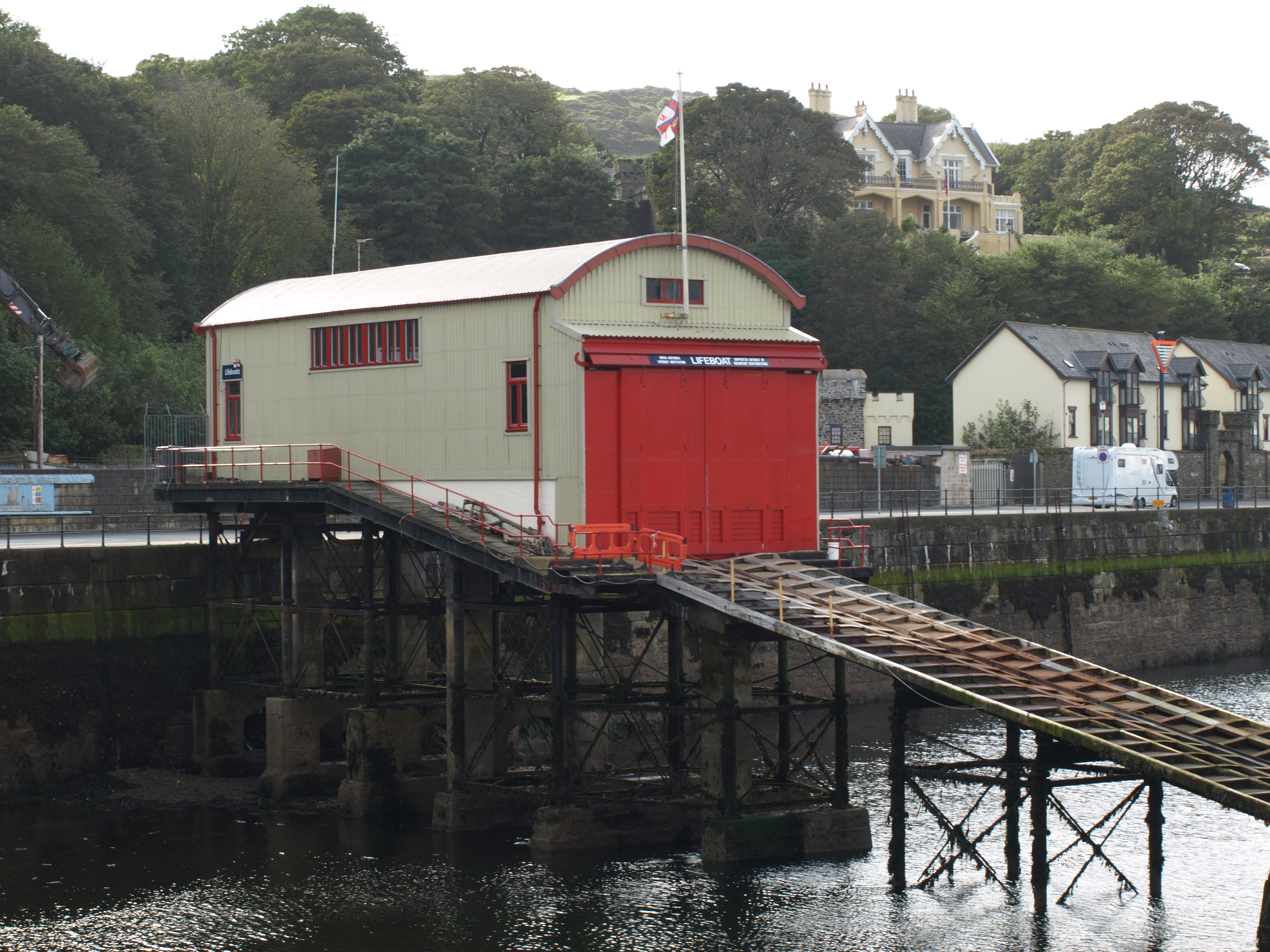
- Douglas Lifeboat Station in 2012

- Location within Isle of Man

General information
- Type: RNLI Lifeboat Station
- Location: Battery Pier, Douglas Head, Douglas, IM1 5BT, Isle of Man
- Coordinates: 54°08′42″N 4°28′11″W
- Opened: 1802–1815; 1825–c.1851; 1868–2026
- Owner: Royal National Lifeboat Institution

Website
- Douglas RNLI Lifeboat Station

Douglas Lifeboat Station is located at Battery Pier, Douglas Head, in Douglas, capital of the Isle of Man, a British Crown Dependency.

The first Douglas lifeboat was funded by The Duke of Atholl, Governor of the Isle of Man. The boat, built by Henry Greathead, arrived in 1802, and was in service until 1814.

A lifeboat station was established in October 1825, with the arrival of a boat built by William Plenty of Newbury, Berkshire, provided by the Royal National Institution for the Preservation of Life from Shipwreck (RNIPLS). Following a period of decline, the station was re-established by the RNLI in 1868, operating continuously until November 2025.

In August 2026, the station was temporarily closed, pending the assignment of a replacement lifeboat and crew retraining.

== History ==
Douglas on the Isle of Man holds a special place in the history of the Royal National Lifeboat Institution (RNLI), previously the Royal National Institution for the Preservation of Life from Shipwreck (RNIPLS), as this was the home of its founder, Sir William Hillary, 1st Baronet, (1771–1847).

Prior to the RNLI's foundation, in 1802, a lifeboat was provided to Douglas by John Murray, 4th Duke of Atholl, Governor of the Isle of Man. She was an 8-oared 25 ft (7.6 m) Greathead-class lifeboat, costing £130, and was named Atholl. There are no records of any service by the boat. The boat was kept out in the open, on the beach, and was washed away and wrecked in a storm of December 1814.

On 6 October 1822, the Royal Navy ship HMS Vigilant was wrecked on the Conister Rock, (later the location of the Tower of Refuge), and it was only due to the daring actions of William Hillary and a group of volunteers, using local boats, that 97 men were rescued.

Having witnessed many wrecks and loss of life whilst living in Douglas, and now inspired by the events of 1822, Hillary published his Appeal to the Nation in 1823. He gained the support of his philanthropic friends in London society.

A public meeting was held at the City of London Tavern, Bishopsgate on 4 March 1824, with attendees including the Archbishop of Canterbury, various MPs, and high-profile public figures such as William Wilberforce and sea rescue expert Capt. George William Manby FRS. It was resolved to form the National Institution for the Preservation of Life from Shipwreck.

The Institution was granted royal patronage by King George IV 16 days later on 20 March 1824, thus becoming the Royal National Institution for the Preservation of Life from Shipwreck. Prime Minister Robert Jenkinson was made president, with the Archbishop of Canterbury, Dr Charles Manners-Sutton becoming vice-president. Hillary was awarded an honorary Gold Medal as founder.

In August 1824, Hillary requested of the Institution, that a new lifeboat station be established at Douglas. The request was one of several approved, and orders for a number of lifeboats, including ones for Brighton, Newhaven and Appledore, were placed with William Plenty of Newbury, previously the winner of a lifeboat design competition. He provided a 20-foot lifeboat, named Nestor, which arrived in Douglas in early October 1825.

However, also following the events of October 1822, a group of marine insurance companies, including Lloyd's of London, had already agreed in April 1824 to fund a new lifeboat for Douglas. She was a 29-foot North Country type, built by Wake of Sunderland, and cost £112. She arrived in Douglas in November 1824, 11 months before the Institution's boat, and was named True Blue, (or George IV in some reports).

It may be that Nestor suffered a very short career. On her first and only recorded service, just days after her arrival in Douglas, to the vessel City of Glasgow in trouble in Douglas Bay on 19 October 1825, Nestor was driven onto the rocks on her return trip and was badly damaged, although the 15 people rescued from the ship and the lifeboat crew made it safely ashore.

=== 1826 onwards ===
There are conflicting reports of exactly which lifeboats were in service at Douglas after the wreck of the Nestor. The True Blue remained in service for many years until c.1851, with many heroic and medal-winning services performed. Hillary requested that new stations be set up in Peel (1828) and Ramsey (1829), and a new boat for Peel was ordered from Taylor of Blackwall, London. Another boat was ordered locally, a 29-foot 10-oared Palmer-type boat, from boat builder Robert Oates of Douglas. Whilst one report shows that this boat was being built for Ramsey, another report indicates that Ramsey's boat was actually built by Harton of Limehouse, and transported to Ramsey aboard HM Cutter Industry, arriving on 20 February 1829.

When the vessel Eclipse of Glasgow ran aground in Douglas Bay in January 1830, Hillary, along with lifeboat coxswain Isaac Vondy and crew, took the unfinished boat from Robert Oates' yard, and launched to her aid. In extreme conditions, with the lifeboat still missing air-cases, causing her to carry excess water from the pounding waves, everyone was safely recovered. Hillary received his second Gold Medal for gallantry.

In 1833, RNLI records show two Douglas lifeboats in service. One was the True Blue, but the identity of the second boat is unclear: maybe the unnamed boat from Robert Oates, or possibly the Nestor, which may have been repaired. By 1843, only True Blue was reported to be in service at Douglas.

A period of decline followed the death of Hillary in 1847, the driving force behind the Institution on the Isle. A report of 1851 records the True Blue as unserviceable. The Institution decided to commission a 24 ft (7.3 m) Peake-class lifeboat from Wallis of Blackwall, London, to be named Sir William Hillary, Bt., and by May 1853, it was reported as ready. No records exist to show any service by this boat, or indeed, that it was ever delivered to Douglas.

=== 1866 onwards ===
In 1866, the RNLI resolved to form a new lifeboat station at Douglas. A new boathouse was built on Harris Promenade, at the corner of Church Road, and a 32 ft (9.8 m) self-righting lifeboat was commissioned from Forrest of Limehouse, London, at a cost of £246.

£325 was received from the Manchester and Salford Sunday Schools Fund, which covered the cost of the boat, plus all kit and equipment, and the launching carriage. On 5 February 1868, the boat was first transported by rail to Manchester, and paraded through the streets to Peel Park, Salford. There she was greeted by about 10,000 Sunday-school children and parents, and named Manchester and Salford Sunday Schools.

In 1872, William Curphey took over as coxswain. However, when a launch in September 1873 failed to rescue three men from drowning, he resigned, citing that the boathouse was in the wrong location, which had caused unnecessary delays in launching.

The RNLI subsequently decided to place a second boat at the harbour, to be kept afloat at its moorings, and creating a No. 2 station. This boat arrived in 1874, and was named John Turner-Turner in the memory of the late husband of Mrs Turner-Turner of Ringwood, Hampshire, who had provided the funds for the boat.

The No. 1 station effectively closed, when the boat house on Harris Promenade was sold to Douglas Corporation in 1892, although the No. 1 lifeboat Thomas Rose (ON 191) remained in service for a further four years, kept under a tarpaulin at the quay. A severe storm of December 1895 caused the No. 2 boat, Civil Service No. 6 (ON 273), to break her moorings, and she was wrecked on the rocks. She was withdrawn from service, and No. 2 station closed.

Following a meeting between the RNLI and Douglas Harbour Commissioners in 1896, a new boat house on the Battery Quay was commissioned, along with a slipway. A replacement boat was also ordered, another 42 ft (13 m) 12-oared self-righting boat, built by Rutherford of Birkenhead. Costing £618, she was also named Civil Service No. 6 (ON 384), arriving in Douglas on 5 June 1896. The entire cost was met by the Civil Service Lifeboat Fund. Thomas Rose was withdrawn from service.

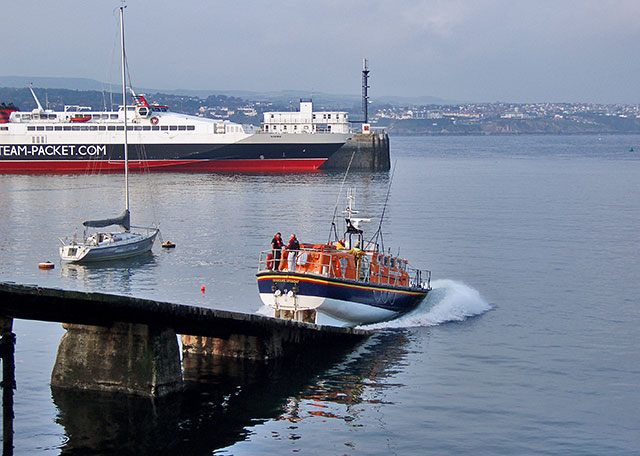
Launching Tyne-class lifeboat 47-032 Sir William Hillary in 2008

In 1920, the RNLI announced that a new motor-powered lifeboat would be provided for Douglas. To accommodate the lifeboat, a new lifeboat house with slipway was constructed, mounted on piles built in the harbour, sited in front of the existing boathouse, and costing £10,000.

The new lifeboat was a 45-foot Watson-class lifeboat, built by S. E. Saunders, costing £8,456. Arriving in Douglas in November 1924 and funded by the Manchester and Salford branch of the RNLI, she was sailed over to Trafford Wharf on the Manchester Ship Canal in June 1925, for a naming ceremony attended by over 25,000 people. She was duly named Manchester and Salford (ON 689) by Lady Fry, wife of the Lieutenant Governor of the Isle of Man.

== Present day ==
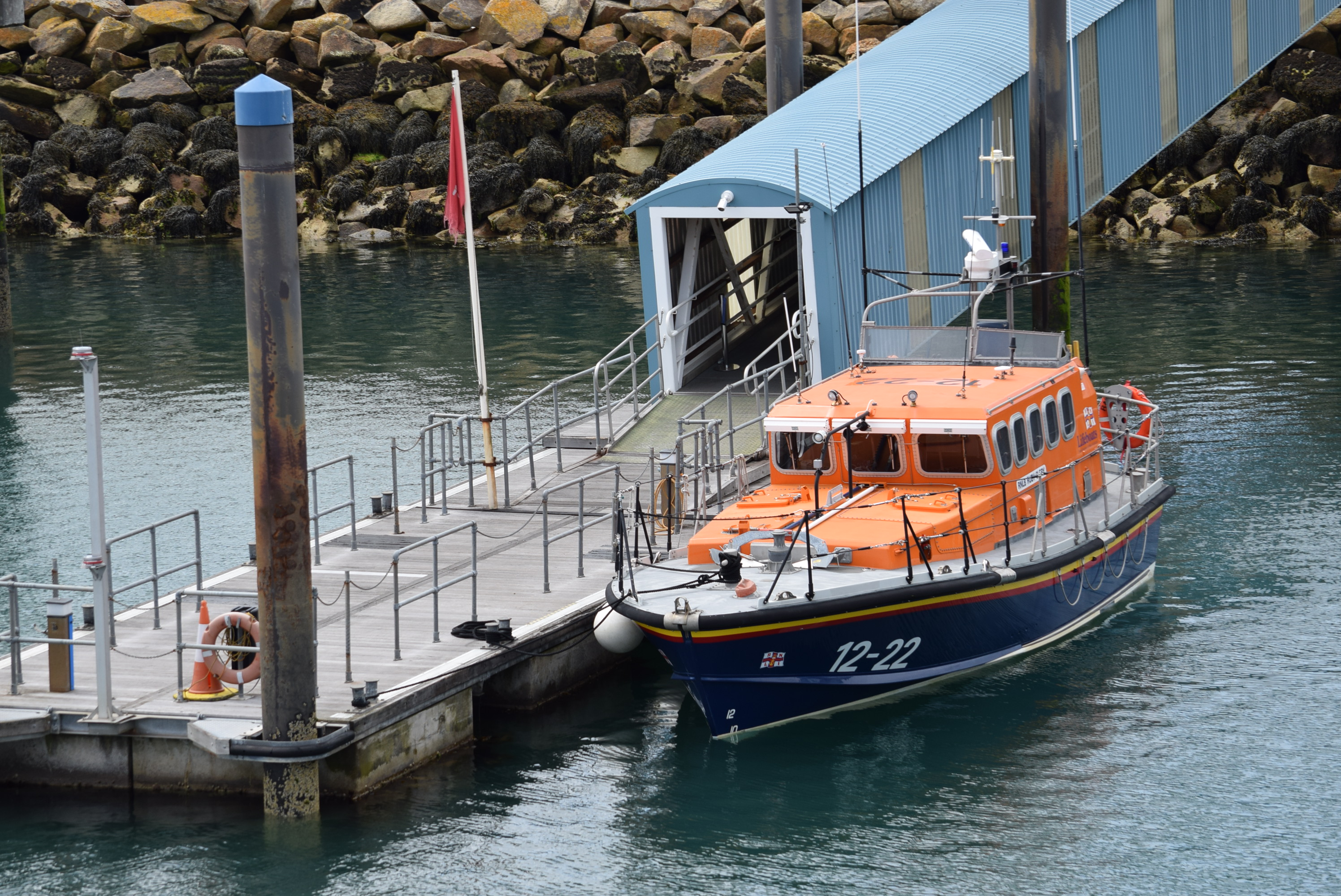
Mersey-class RNLI lifeboat 12-22 Ruby Clery (ON 1181)

In 2024, the winch in the 1920s boathouse failed. Before the winch was replaced, a structural survey revealed that the boathouse was unsafe. From then, the Mersey-class All-weather lifeboat 12-22 Ruby Clery (ON 1181), previously at Peel and Ramsey, was moored afloat on a pontoon, accessed through the Douglas sea terminal.

On 5 February 2025, the RNLI announced that the Mersey-class lifeboat would be withdrawn from Douglas later in the year, and be replaced with the Trent-class All-weather lifeboat 14-37 Betty Huntbatch (ON 1274), which duly arrived on 9 August 2025 to commence a period of crew training.

The Mersey-class All-weather lifeboat 12-22 Ruby Clery (ON 1181) was formally retired on 30 November 2025. However, training on the Trent class lifeboat was still incomplete, and the station went off service. This status continued until August 2026, a full year since the replacement boat arrived in Douglas. Following a meeting of crew and management in early August 2026, the station was closed temporarily, and the entire crew were stood down. The Trent-class lifeboat was removed from the station.

== Notable rescues ==
On Friday, 19 November 1830, the Royal Mail steamer St George was driven onto the Conister Rocks whilst at anchor in Douglas Bay. Sir William Hillary, Coxswain Isaac Vondy, 14 crew and two volunteers launched the True Blue to her aid. After two hours of rowing in violent seas, they reached a point where they could anchor and veer down between the rocks and the St George. The lifeboat was badly damaged on the rocks, its rudder broken and six oars swept away, and then Hillary and three men, including volunteer William Corlett, were washed overboard. All four men were recovered to the boat, including 59-year-old Hillary, now with six broken ribs. The mast of the St George had blocked their escape route, and two hours were spent cutting it away. Finally, the lifeboat got away, only to be struck by another violent wave, pitching more men into the sea. These men were also recovered to the boat, and finally, with the assistance of two harbour boats, all were rescued.

For this service, Hillary and Lt. Robert Robinson, RN, were each awarded the RNLI Gold Medal. Coxswain Isaac Vondy and volunteer William Corlett each received the RNLI Silver Medal.

== Station honours ==
The following are awards made at Douglas:

- RNIPLS Gold Medal
  Sir William Hillary, Bt. – 1825
  Sir William Hillary, Bt. – 1828 (Second-Service Gold Boat)
  Sir William Hillary, Bt. – 1830 (Third-Service Gold Boat)
  Sir William Hillary, Bt. – 1830 (Fourth-Service Gold Boat)
  Lt. Robert Robinson, RN – 1830
- RNIPLS Silver Medal
  Augustus William Hillary – 1828
  Lt. Robert Robinson, RN – 1828
  Lt. William Baker Strugnell, RN, H.M. Coastguard, Cruiser Swallow – 1828
  George Quirk, Water Baliff – 1828
  Thomas Brine, Lloyd's Agent – 1828
  William Henry Carrington, Comptroller of Customs – 1828
  Isaac Vondy, Coxswain – 1830
  William Corlett, Steam Packet Agent – 1830
  Isaac Vondy, Coxswain – 1833 (Second-Service)
  Isaac Vondy, Coxswain – 1833 (Third-Service Silver Boat)
  William Milburn – 1837
  Capt. Edward Quayle, Steam Mail Packet Mona's Isle – 1839
  William Cain, Boatman – 1840
  Capt. Edward Quayle – 1841 (Second-Service clasp)
  Thomas Cannell, Coxswain – 1841
- 'The Thanks of the Institution inscribed on Vellum'
  Henry Madoc – 1936
  Arthur Kitto – 1955
  Capt. J. L. Robertson, Honorary Secretary – 1971
- Member, Order of the British Empire (MBE)
  Robert Jerome Corran, Coxswain – 1999QBH
- British Empire Medal
  Robert Lee, Coxswain – 1970QBH
  Gillian Rosemary Cowley, For voluntary services to the RNLI on the Isle of Man – 2025NYH

== Douglas lifeboats ==
=== No. 1 Station ===
ON (Note: ON is the RNLI's Official Number of the boat.)	Name	Built	On station	Class	Comments
–	Atholl	1802	1802–1814	25-foot Greathead	(Note: 25 ft 0 in (7.62 m) x 9 ft 0 in (2.74 m) (8-oared) Greathead-class non-self-righting lifeboat, funded by The Duke of Atholl, built by Henry Greathead of South Shields, costing £130.); Washed away and wrecked, December 1814.
Pre-092	True Blue (or George IV)	1824	1824–c.1851	29-foot North Country	(Note: 29 ft 0 in (8.84 m) x 10 ft 0 in (3.05 m) (10-oared) North Country non-self-righting lifeboat, funded by Local Subscription and Lloyd's of London, built by Wake of Sunderland, costing £112.); Unservicable by 1851.
Pre-107	Nestor	1825	1825	20-foot Plenty	(Note: 20 ft 0 in (6.10 m) x 6 ft 9 in (2.06 m) (6-oared) non-self-righting lifeboat, built by William Plenty of Newbury, Berkshire, costing £100.); Wrecked on service, 19 October 1825.
–	Unnamed	1830	1830–????	28-foot Palmer	(Note: 28 ft 0 in (8.53 m) Palmer type non-self-righting lifeboat, built by Robert Oates of Douglas, Isle of Man.)
Pre-514	Manchester and Salford Sunday Schools	1868	1868–1887	32-foot Prowse self-righting (P&S)	(Note: 32 ft 0 in (9.75 m) x 7 ft 6 in (2.29 m) (10-oared) Prowse-class self-righting (P&S) lifeboat, gift of Manchester and Salford Sunday Schools LB fund, built by Forrestt of Limehouse, London, costing £246.); Sold in 1889.
–	Russel and Oswald Life-Raft	1850	1850–c.1852	30-foot Tubular	(Note: 30 ft 0 in (9.14 m) x 8 ft 6 in (2.59 m) (10-oared) Tubular-class (P&S) lifeboat, built by Russel and Oswald)
191	Thomas Rose	1887	1887–1896	34-foot self-righting (P&S)	(Note: 34 ft 0 in (10.36 m) x 7 ft 6 in (2.29 m) (10-oared) self-righting (P&S) lifeboat, legacy of Mr T. Rose of Manchester, built by Woolfe of Shadwell, London, costing £328.); Sold in 1896.

No.1 Station officially closed in 1892, but lifeboat Thomas Rose remained on service until 1896.
Pre ON numbers are unofficial numbers used by the Lifeboat Enthusiasts' Society to reference early lifeboats not included on the official RNLI list.

=== No. 2 Station ===
ON	Name	Built	On station	Class	Comments
Pre-589	John Turner-Turner	1874	1874–1890	35-foot self-righting (P&S)	(Note: 35 ft 0 in (10.67 m) x 9 ft 0 in (2.74 m) (10-oared) self-righting (P&S) lifeboat, gift of Mrs Turner-Turner of Ringwood, Hampshire, built by Woolfe of Shadwell, costing £465.); Sold in 1890.
273	Civil Service No. 6	1890	1890–1895	42-foot self-righting (P&S)	(Note: 42 ft 0 in (12.80 m) x 11 ft 0 in (3.35 m) (12-oared) self-righting (P&S) lifeboat, gift of the Civil Service LB fund, built by Forrestt of Limehouse, London, costing £667.); Lifeboat broke from moorings in a storm in 1895 and was wrecked.

No.2 Station Closed, 1895.

=== New Station ===
ON	Op.No. (Note: Op. No. is the RNLI's Operational Number of the boat carried on the hull.)	Name	Built	On station	Class	Comments
384	–	Civil Service No. 6	1895	1896–1924	42-foot self-righting (P&S)	(Note: 42 ft 0 in (12.80 m) x 11 ft 4 in (3.45 m) (12-oared) self-righting (P&S) lifeboat, gift of the Civil Service LB fund, built by Rutherford of Birkenhead, costing £618.); Sold in July 1925.
689	–	Manchester and Salford	1924	1924–1946	45-foot Watson	
848	–	Millie Watson	1946	1946–1956	46-foot Watson	Transferred to the relief fleet, later at Amble.
929	–	R. A. Colby Cubbin No.1	1955	1956–1988	46-foot 9in Watson	
1147	47-032	Sir William Hillary	1988	1988–2018	Tyne	
1169	12-12	Marine Engineer	1991	2018–2022	Mersey	Previously at Bridlington
1181	12-22	Ruby Clery	1992	2022–2023	Mersey	Previously at Peel and Ramsey
1191	12-32	Joy and Charles Beeby	1992	2023–2024	Mersey	Previously at Berwick-upon-Tweed
1181	12-22	Ruby Clery	1992	2024	Mersey	
1172	12-15	Frank and Lena Clifford of Stourbridge	1991	2024–2025	Mersey	Previously at New Quay
1181	12-22	Ruby Clery	1992	2025	Mersey	Retired from service, 30 November 2025

== See also ==
- List of RNLI stations
- List of former RNLI stations
- Royal National Lifeboat Institution lifeboats
