= Leverburgh Lifeboat Station =

RNLI Lifeboat station in the Outer Hebrides, Scotland

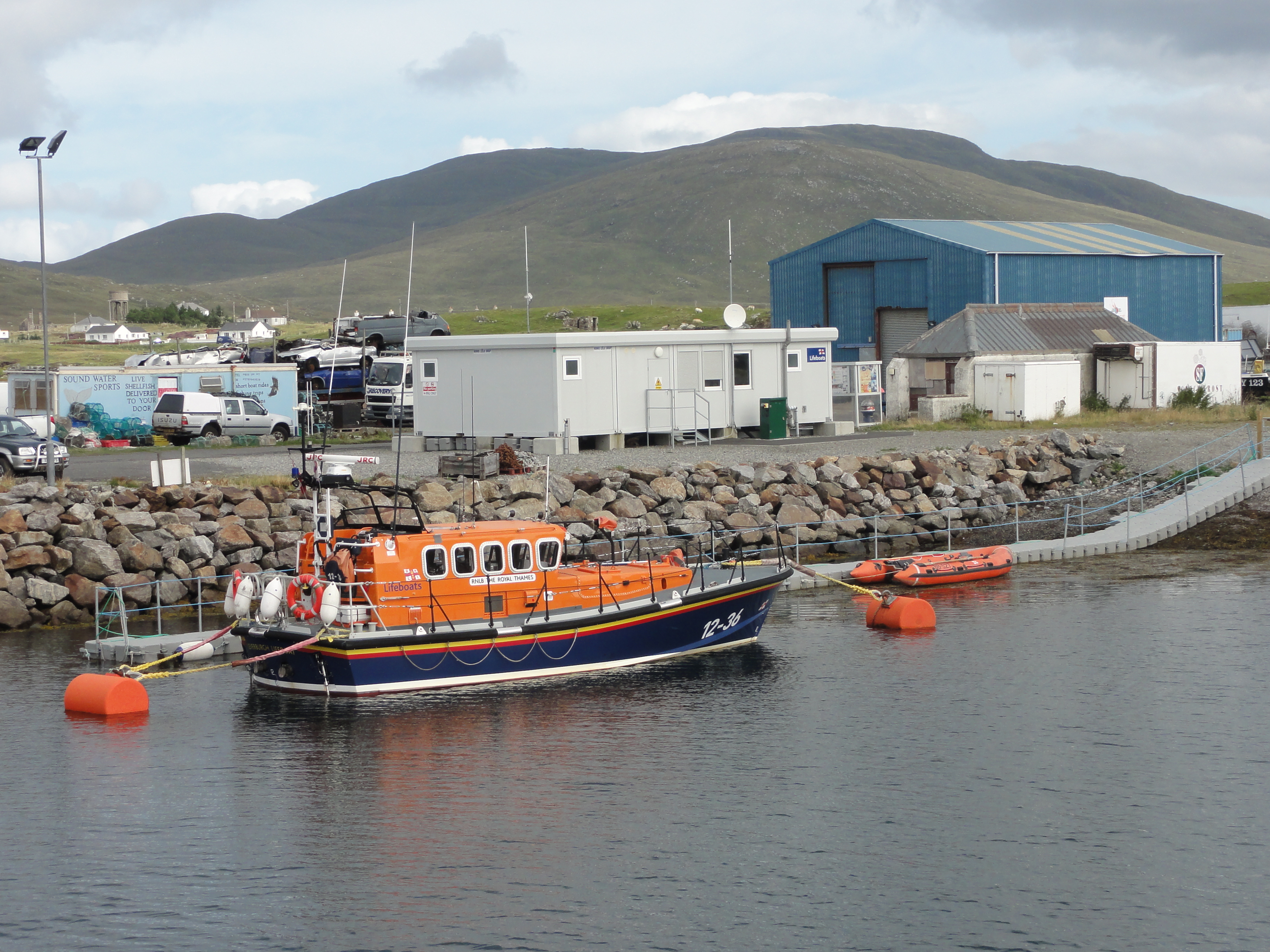
- Leverburgh Lifeboat Station

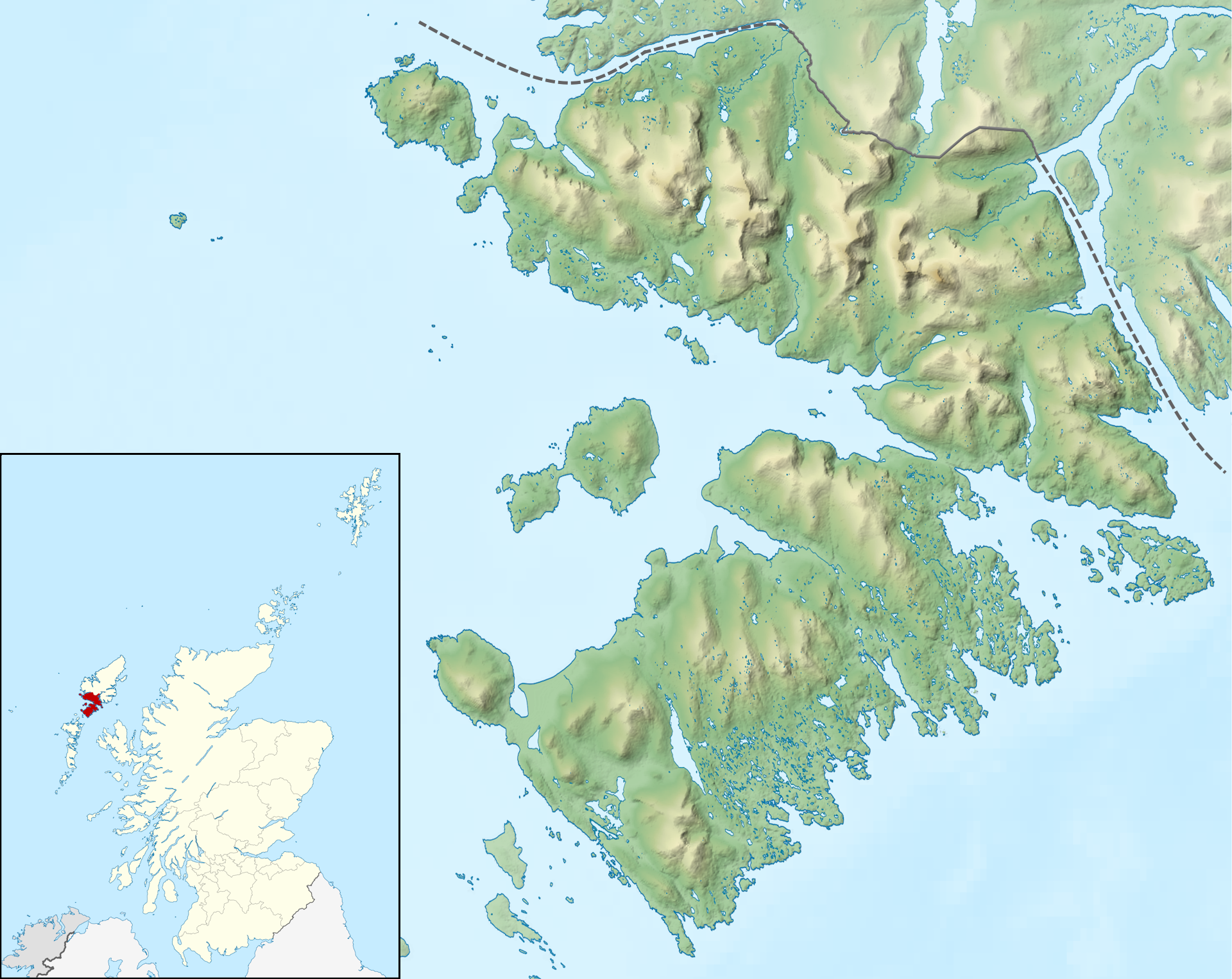
- Location within Harris Location within Outer Hebrides

General information
- Type: RNLI Lifeboat Station
- Location: Pier Road, Leverburgh, Isle of Harris, HS5 3UF, Scotland
- Coordinates: 57°46′01.8″N 7°01′31.1″W
- Opened: 11 May 2012
- Closed: September 2025
- Owner: Royal National Lifeboat Institution

Website
- Leverburgh RNLI Lifeboat Station

Leverburgh Lifeboat Station was located at Leverburgh, a village at the southern end of the Isle of Harris, part of the Outer Hebrides, an archipelago sitting off the north-west coast of Scotland.

The station at Leverburgh was one of the youngest of the stations of the Royal National Lifeboat Institution (RNLI), a lifeboat being placed here in 2012.

After operating Mersey-class and Shannon-class All-weather lifeboats, followed by a period operating a B-class (Atlantic 85) Inshore lifeboat, Leverburgh Lifeboat Station closed at the end of September 2025.

== History ==
In 2012, the RNLI opened a new station at Leverburgh, situated at the midpoint between the two existing flanking lifeboat stations at Barra Island and Stornoway.

Crew selection had taken place in 2011, and training progressed through 2012. On 2 May 2012, the relief All-weather Mersey-class lifeboat 12-11 Lifetime Care (ON 1148) arrived at Leverburgh for final training. The station was formally declared open and operational on 11 May 2012.

Only hours after the lifeboat was declared operational, the boat was called out on her first service on Saturday 12 May 2012. The fishing boat Siolta had engine problems south off Wiay Island, and were escorted to Peter's Port on Benbecula.

On 7 August 2012, Lifetime Care was returned to the relief fleet, and Leverburgh received their permanent boat. Having just had the first GRP-hulled Mersey-class lifeboat, Leverburgh would now receive the last, 12-36 The Royal Thames (ON 1195), which had previously served at Eastbourne since 1993.

In 2016, an appeal launched to raise £60,000 towards the cost of a new pontoon, for safer access to the lifeboat, received a massive boost when the station received £335,377, a bequest from the late Mary Aida MacLeod MacAskill of Edinburgh. This legacy was left to the RNLI specifically to use on the west coast of Scotland, and on consultation with Ms. MacAskill's executors, it was agreed that the money be used for on-shore work at the Leverburgh station, including construction of the pontoon.

On 11 April 2018, a new £2.2 million Shannon-class lifeboat departed the RNLI production facility at Poole in Dorset, bound for Leverburgh. This would be the longest delivery voyage for any Shannon-class lifeboat, with overnight stops at RNLI stations at Torbay, Newlyn, Kilmore Quay, Dún Laoghaire and Girvan. After a crew change, the lifeboat then headed for Oban, Tobermory, Mallaig, and then onwards via Scalpay on the Isle of Harris. The new boat arrived in Leverburgh on 21 April 2018, to replace the now 25-year-old The Royal Thames, which was withdrawn to the relief fleet, later sold out of service in 2021.

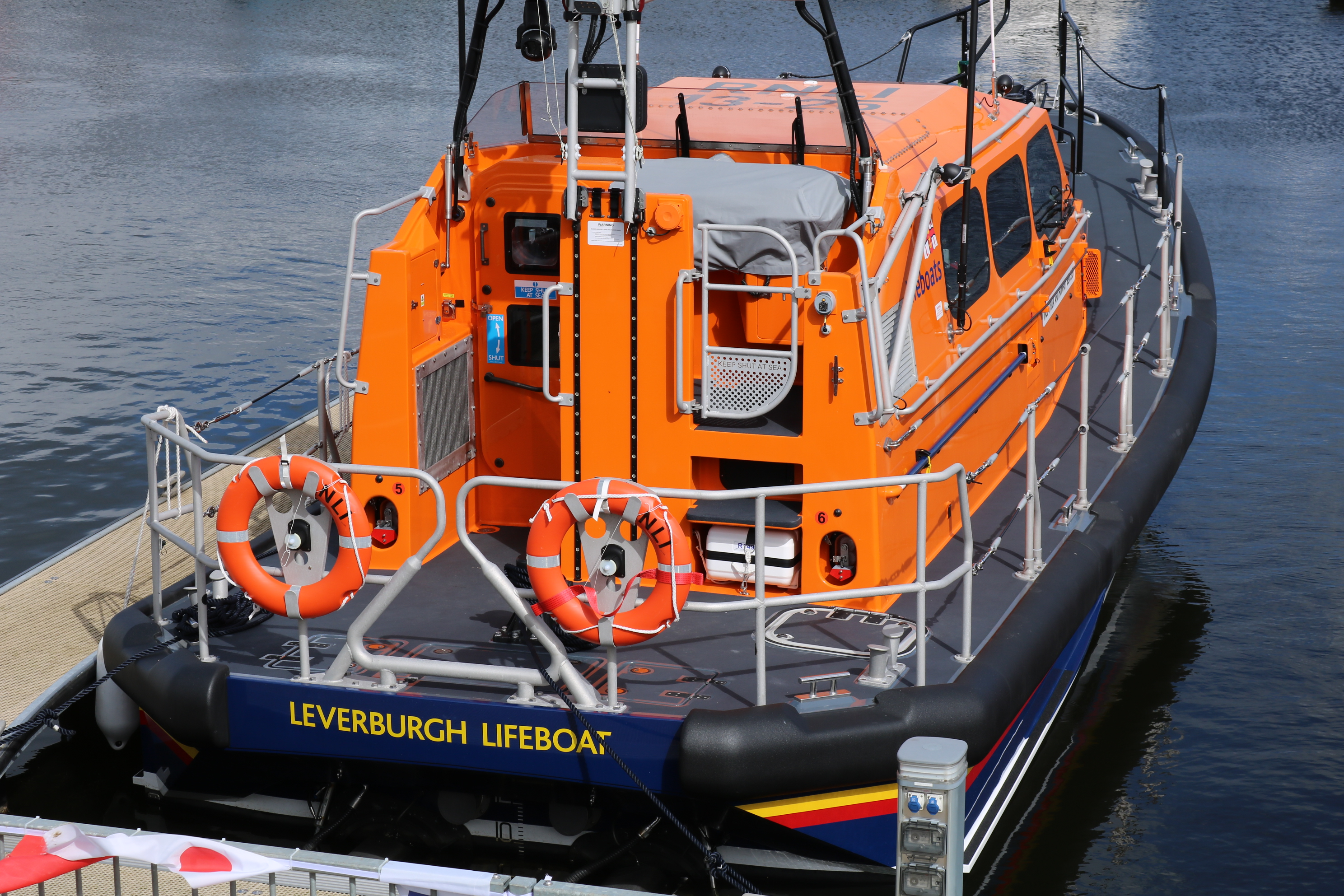
Shannon-class All-weather lifeboat 13-25 Stella and Humfrey Berkeley (ON 1332)

The majority of the cost of the new Leverburgh lifeboat was funded by the legacy of Mr Humfrey Ingram Berkeley, a keen RNLI supporter, who left all of his residual estate to the RNLI. He requested that a lifeboat be named after him and his wife, and for it to be stationed on the west coast of Scotland. At a naming ceremony on 14 July, the Leverburgh lifeboat was named 13-25 Stella and Humfrey Berkeley (ON 1332). Other donors to the boat included Mrs Muriel Madeleine Mackay, Mr Hugh John Waterman, Miss Isabel May Hogg and the Leverhulme Trust.

The first service launch would come just under one month later, on 14 May 2018, to the aid of a woman who had injured her back, on a yacht north of Lochmaddy, North Uist.

In November 2019, operations were suspended at Leverburgh, due to difficulties maintaining sufficient crew. On 15 September 2020, the lifeboat was moved to Inverness for routine maintenance, but didn't return. By November 2020, not helped by the Covid pandemic, there was still no lifeboat at Leverburgh, and it was thought that the station may close permanently.

It was announced in 2021, after a period of consultation with all parties, that the best solution to the difficulties at Leverburgh, would be to provide the station with a B-class (Atlantic 85) Inshore lifeboat. The Shannon-class lifeboat was transferred to the relief fleet. It was said that this class of lifeboat would comfortably be able to respond to the majority of calls typically received at Leverburgh, and would resolve some of the crewing issues, requiring fewer crew and launch helpers.

The relief B-class (Atlantic 85) lifeboat John and Louisa Fisher (B-870) was placed at Leverburgh in 2021 on evaluation. A floating 'Drive-On' pontoon (Versadock) was installed, to keep the boat out of the water, but ready for launch at a moments notice. Shannon lifeboat 13-25 Stella and Humfrey Berkeley (ON 1332) was permanently reassigned to Portpatrick in 2024.

On 30 July 2025, it was announced that the station was again facing closure. A number of unforeseen factors, resulting in falling crew numbers, were reported by the management group, which led to a decision to withdraw from the trial at the end of the summer season 2025. The Inshore lifeboat was withdrawn at the end of September 2025.

== Leverburgh lifeboats ==
=== All-weather lifeboats ===
ON (Note: ON is the RNLI's Official Number of the boat.)	Op.No. (Note: Op. No. is the RNLI's Operational Number of the boat carried on the hull.)	Name	Built	On station	Class	Comments
1148	12-11	Lifetime Care	1988	2012	Mersey	Relief fleet
1195	12-36	The Royal Thames	1993	2012–2018	Mersey	Previously at Eastbourne
1332	13-25	Stella and Humfrey Berkeley	2018	2018–2020	Shannon	

All-weather lifeboat withdrawn, 2021

=== Inshore lifeboats ===
Op.No.	Name	On station	Class	Comments
B-870	John and Louisa Fisher	2021–2025	B-class (Atlantic 85)	

Station Closed, 2025

== See also ==
- List of RNLI stations
- List of former RNLI stations
- Royal National Lifeboat Institution lifeboats
