= Mersey-class lifeboat =

Former RNLI lifeboat class

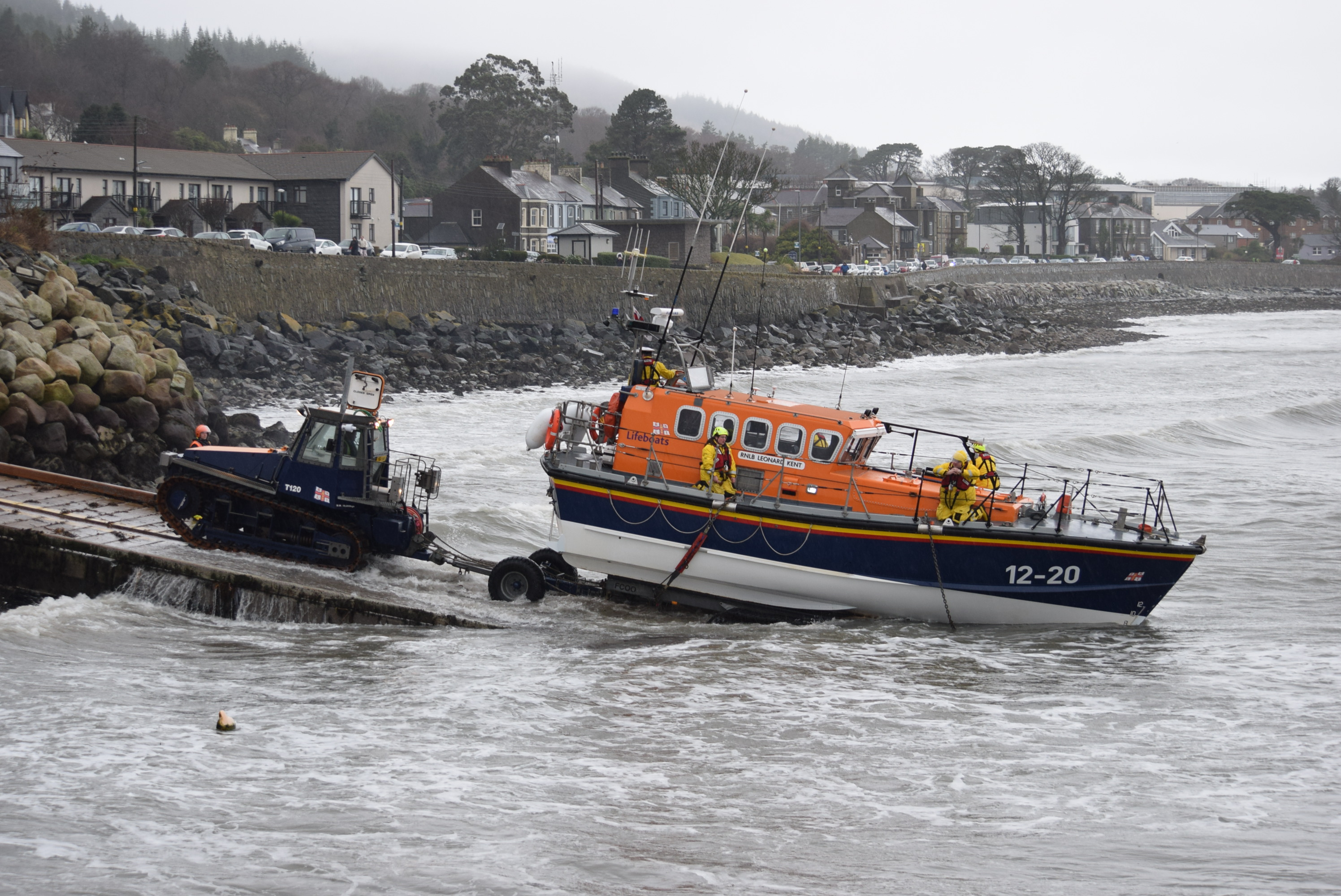
- Final launch of 12-20 Leonard Kent (ON 1177) at Newcastle, County Down, 11 January 2026

Class overview
- Name: Mersey Class
- Builders: A1 Shipbuilders; William Osborne, Littlehampton, FBM Marine, Hamble; Souters Marine, Cowes; Green Marine, Lymington
- Operators: Royal National Lifeboat Institution; ADES Uruguay; Bote Salvavidas de Valparaíso, Chile
- Preceded by: Rother, Oakley
- Succeeded by: Shannon, B-class (Atlantic 85)
- Cost: £430,000–£704,230
- Built: 1986–1993
- In service: 1988–present
- Completed: 38
- Active: 4
- Retired: 34
- Preserved: 1

General characteristics
- Displacement: 14.3 t (14.1 long tons)
- Length: 11.62 m (38.1 ft)
- Beam: 4.0 m (13.1 ft)
- Draught: 1.02 m (3.3 ft)
- Propulsion: 2 × 285 hp (213 kW) Caterpillar 3208T diesel engines
- Speed: 17 knots (20 mph; 31 km/h)
- Range: 240 nmi (440 km)
- Endurance: 10.25 hours approx. at cruising speed
- Capacity: 43 survivors (self-righting up to 21)
- Complement: 6

Mersey-class lifeboats are a class of All-weather lifeboats, originally operated by the Royal National Lifeboat Institution (RNLI). Introduced in 1988, 38 of this class of lifeboat would come to operate from stations around the coasts of Great Britain and Ireland. They are capable of operating at up to 17 knots (31 km/h) and can be launched from a carriage or by slipway.

The class name comes from the River Mersey which flows into the Irish Sea in north west England.

== History ==
During the 1960s and 1970s the RNLI introduced fast lifeboats capable of considerable greater speeds than the 8 knots (15 km/h) of existing designs. The first of these were only able to be kept afloat as their propellers would be damaged if launched using a slipway or carriage. In 1982 the steel-hulled Tyne-class came into service, which could be launched down a slipway, but weighed 25 tons, and so was not suitable for being moved across a beach on a carriage. The answer was to build a smaller boat with an aluminium hull, which became the Mersey-class.

The first prototype Mersey (ON 1119) was built in 1986, but was never named or given an operational number. After trials during 1987 and 1988, the unnamed boat was never placed on station, and was sold in 1989. Two more boats were built in 1988, with the first one to take up active service going to Bridlington Lifeboat Station the following year.

In 1989, 12-11 Lifetime Care (ON 1148) was built with a fibre-reinforced composite (FRC) hull. Boats built in 1990 continued to use aluminium but from 1991 FRC became the standard hull material.

On Wednesday 13 December 2023, Her Royal Highness The Duchess of Edinburgh joined RNLI representatives at Windsor Castle for the handover of RNLB 12-30 Her Majesty The Queen (ON 1189) to the Chatham Historic Dockyard for temporary display. On 25 June 2026, the lifeboat was placed on permanent display at the RNLI College.

The RNLI intended to have 25 knot lifeboats at all offshore lifeboat stations by the end of 2019, and the first of the Shannon-class lifeboats replaced the Mersey lifeboats at Dungeness, Exmouth and Hoylake in 2014. It would be eleven years later, when the last Mersey-class lifeboat in RNLI service, 12-20 Leonard Kent (ON 1177), at Newcastle, was formally withdrawn from service on 18 December 2025.

Four former RNLI Mersey-class boats are still in service overseas, three operated by ADES Uruguay, and one by Bote Salvavidas de Valparaíso, Chile.

== Description ==
The Mersey is designed to be launched from a carriage, but can also lie afloat or be slipway launched when required. Its propellers are fully protected from damage when launching or in shallow water, by partial tunnels and two bilge keels. Its low height can be further reduced by collapsing its mast and aerials which then allows it to be stored in a boathouse. A sealed cabin gives it a self-righting ability.

Power comes from two 3208T Caterpillar turbo-charged marine diesel engines giving 285 hp at 2,800 rpm. It carries 1,110 litres (290 US gal) of fuel to give it a range of 240 nautical miles (440 km). It has a crew of six and can carry an inflatable X-boat which it can deploy at sea. Its survivor compartment can carry 43 people, but more than 21 prevents self-righting should the boat capsize.

== Gallery ==
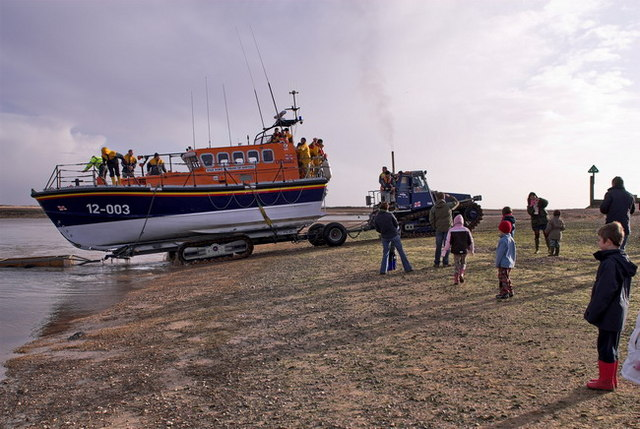
Launching from a carriage and Talus MB-H amphibious tractor

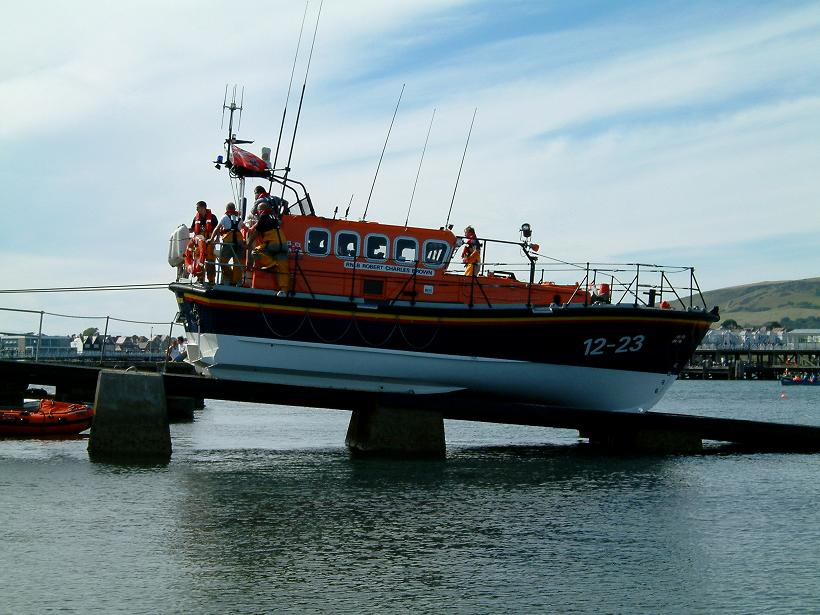
Launching from a slipway

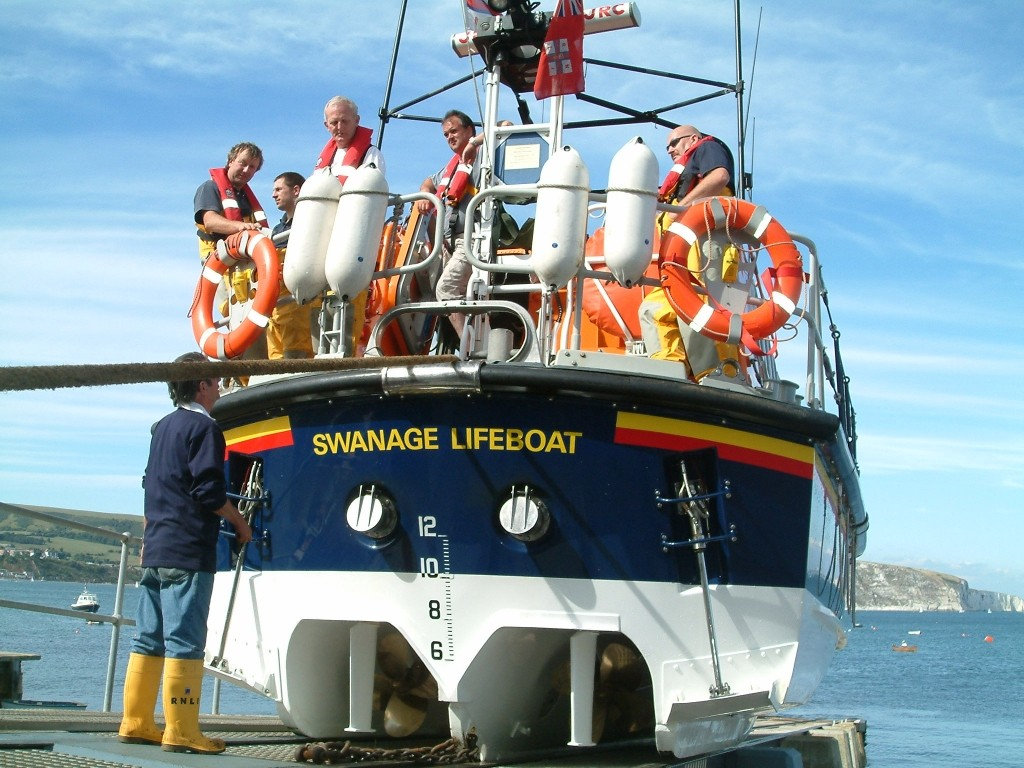
Stern showing the protected propellers

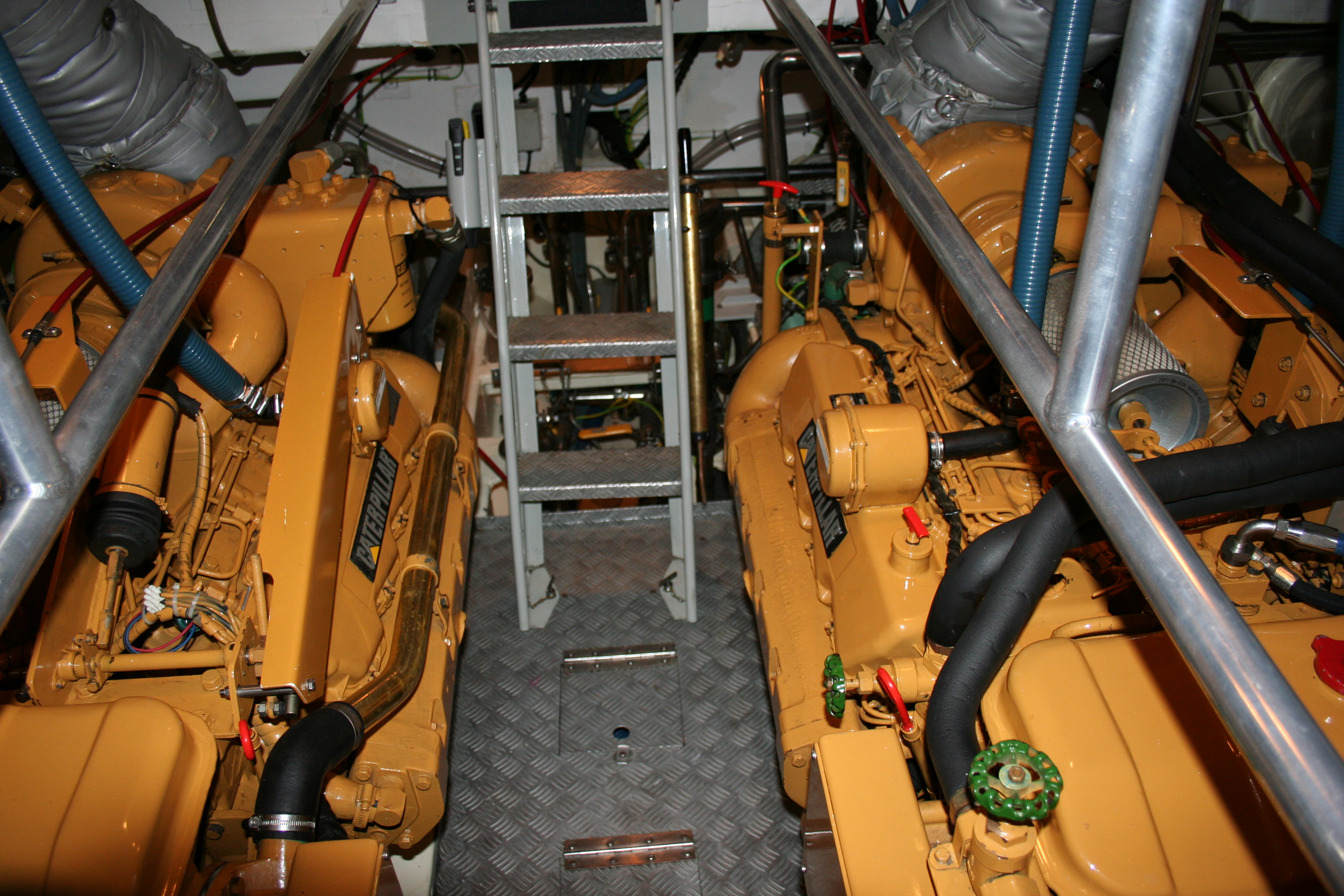
Engine room

All of the following fleet details are referenced to the 2026 Lifeboat Enthusiasts' Society Handbook, with information retrieved directly from RNLI records.

== RNLI fleet ==
ON (Note: ON is the RNLI's Official Number of the boat.)	Op. No. (Note: Op.No. is the RNLI's Operational Number of the boat carried on the hull.)	Name	Built	In Service	Station / Launch method	Comments
1119	–	Unnamed	1986	1987–1988	Trials	(Note: Prototype lifeboat, built by William Osborne.); Sold 1989. Named Keelman, later Spirit. Sold December 2025, for restoration in Cork, County Cork.
1125	12-002	Sealink Endeavour	1987	1987–1989	Trials	(Note: Funded from promotion by Sealink British Ferries Lts, legacies of Dr W, R. H. Murphy and Mrs D. M. Kellett, plus other gifts, built by A1 Shipbuilders / William Osborne, costing £498,925.); Sold 2020. Renamed Endeavour, workboat with Ambrey Shipyards at Hythe Marine, Hampshire, March 2025.
1125	12-002	Sealink Endeavour	1987	1989–2018	Hastings (Carriage)	Sold 2020. Renamed Endeavour, workboat with Ambrey Shipyards at Hythe Marine, Hampshire, March 2025.
1124	12-001	Peggy and Alex Caird	1988	1988–1995	Bridlington (Carriage)	(Note: Legacy of Mrs M. M. Caird, plus other gifts, built by A1 Shipbuilders / William Osborne, costing £498,925.); Sold 2015. Renamed Mersey Rose with Needles Pleasure Cruises. Sold 2017. Renamed Orange Apex, with Orange Force Marine Ltd and Coast Guard Auxiliary Vessel, Port Stanley, Ontario, Canada. Sold October 2023. Renamed Life Aquatic 12-001, at Lake Champlain, South Hero, Vermont, USA, December 2023.
1124	12-001	Peggy and Alex Caird	1988	1995–1999	Relief fleet	Sold 2015. Renamed Mersey Rose with Needles Pleasure Cruises. Sold 2017. Renamed Orange Apex, with Orange Force Marine Ltd and Coast Guard Auxiliary Vessel, Port Stanley, Ontario, Canada. Sold October 2023. Renamed Life Aquatic 12-001, at Lake Champlain, South Hero, Vermont, USA, December 2023.
1124	12-001	Peggy and Alex Caird	1988	1999	Lytham St Annes (Carriage)	Sold 2015. Renamed Mersey Rose with Needles Pleasure Cruises. Sold 2017. Renamed Orange Apex, with Orange Force Marine Ltd and Coast Guard Auxiliary Vessel, Port Stanley, Ontario, Canada. Sold October 2023. Renamed Life Aquatic 12-001, at Lake Champlain, South Hero, Vermont, USA, December 2023.
1124	12-001	Peggy and Alex Caird	1988	1999–2009	Relief fleet	Sold 2015. Renamed Mersey Rose with Needles Pleasure Cruises. Sold 2017. Renamed Orange Apex, with Orange Force Marine Ltd and Coast Guard Auxiliary Vessel, Port Stanley, Ontario, Canada. Sold October 2023. Renamed Life Aquatic 12-001, at Lake Champlain, South Hero, Vermont, USA, December 2023.
1124	12-001	Peggy and Alex Caird	1988	2009–2010	Bembridge (Carriage)	Sold 2015. Renamed Mersey Rose with Needles Pleasure Cruises. Sold 2017. Renamed Orange Apex, with Orange Force Marine Ltd and Coast Guard Auxiliary Vessel, Port Stanley, Ontario, Canada. Sold October 2023. Renamed Life Aquatic 12-001, at Lake Champlain, South Hero, Vermont, USA, December 2023.
1124	12-001	Peggy and Alex Caird	1988	2010–2015	Relief fleet	Sold 2015. Renamed Mersey Rose with Needles Pleasure Cruises. Sold 2017. Renamed Orange Apex, with Orange Force Marine Ltd and Coast Guard Auxiliary Vessel, Port Stanley, Ontario, Canada. Sold October 2023. Renamed Life Aquatic 12-001, at Lake Champlain, South Hero, Vermont, USA, December 2023.
1148	12-11	Lifetime Care	1988	1989–1990	Relief fleet	(Note: Gift of Volvo Concessionaires Ltd, (promotion), built by Green Marine / Souters, costing £550,000.); Sold 2017. Workboat for McMullen Shellfish, Glenariffe Harbour, County Antrim, August 2025.
1148	12-11	Lifetime Care	1988	1990–1991	Workington No.2 (Carriage)	Sold 2017. Workboat for McMullen Shellfish, Glenariffe Harbour, County Antrim, August 2025.
1148	12-11	Lifetime Care	1988	1991–2012	Relief fleet	Sold 2017. Workboat for McMullen Shellfish, Glenariffe Harbour, County Antrim, August 2025.
1148	12-11	Lifetime Care	1988	2012	Leverburgh (Afloat)	Sold 2017. Workboat for McMullen Shellfish, Glenariffe Harbour, County Antrim, August 2025.
1148	12-11	Lifetime Care	1988	2012–2017	Relief fleet	Sold 2017. Workboat for McMullen Shellfish, Glenariffe Harbour, County Antrim, August 2025.
1161	12-003	Doris M. Mann of Ampthill	1990	1990–2023	Wells-next-the-Sea (Carriage)	(Note: Legacy of Mrs D. M. Mann, built by FBM Ltd, costing £468,209.); Sold 2023. Last reported at Progreso, Yucatán, Mexico, December 2023.
1162	12-004	Royal Shipwright	1990	1990–2007	Relief fleet	(Note: Gift of the Worshipful Company of Shipwrights, plus other gifts and legacies, built by FBM Ltd, costing £430,000.) MMSI 232002744; Sold 2016. Renamed Patricia. Survey Pilot Vessel, laid up at Mostyn Docks, July 2025.
1162	12-004	Royal Shipwright	1990	2007–2008	Cromer (Carriage)	MMSI 232002744; Sold 2016. Renamed Patricia. Survey Pilot Vessel, laid up at Mostyn Docks, July 2025.
1162	12-004	Royal Shipwright	1990	2008–2016	Relief fleet	MMSI 232002744; Sold 2016. Renamed Patricia. Survey Pilot Vessel, laid up at Mostyn Docks, July 2025.
1163	12-005	Lady of Hilbre	1990	1990–2014	Hoylake (Carriage)	(Note: Gift of the Mersey LB appeal, built by FBM Ltd, costing £430,556.); Sold 2022. Stored at Medway Bridge Marina, October 2025.
1163	12-005	Lady of Hilbre	1990	2014–2021	Relief fleet	Sold 2022. Stored at Medway Bridge Marina, October 2025.
1164	12-006	Andy Pearce	1990	1990–2017	Llandudno (Carriage)	(Note: Legacy of Mr A. S. Pearce, plus other gifts and legacies, built by FBM Ltd, costing £429,494.); Sold 2019. Renamed Njord. Boat trips/charter at Burwick, Orkney, June 2023.
1164	12-006	Andy Pearce	1990	2017–2018	Relief fleet	Sold 2019. Renamed Njord. Boat trips/charter at Burwick, Orkney, June 2023.
1165	12-007	Spirit of Derbyshire	1990	1990–2015	Ilfracombe (Carriage)	(Note: Funded from the 'Spirit of Derbyshire' LB appeal, an appeal by Ilfracombe branch, plus other gifts and legacies, built by A1 Shipbuilders / William Osborne, costing £444,498.) MMSI 215000129. Sold 2015. Renamed Mercy, workboat at Valletta, Malta, October 2025.
1165	12-007	Spirit of Derbyshire	1990	2015	Relief fleet	MMSI 215000129. Sold 2015. Renamed Mercy, workboat at Valletta, Malta, October 2025.
1166	12-008	Lincolnshire Poacher	1990	1990–2017	Skegness (Carriage)	(Note: Funded from the Lincolnshire LB appeal, plus major contribution from the 'John and Lucille Van Geest Charitable Trust', built by A1 Shipbuilders / Souters, costing £460,212.) MMSI 232003204. Sold 2021. Renamed Bailiwick Reliance, at St Peter Port. Sold February 2024. Renamed Samuel Wesley. Workboat (Memorial services) at Dartmouth, Devon, December 2025.
1166	12-008	Lincolnshire Poacher	1990	2017–2021	Relief fleet	MMSI 232003204. Sold 2021. Renamed Bailiwick Reliance, at St Peter Port. Sold February 2024. Renamed Samuel Wesley. Workboat (Memorial services) at Dartmouth, Devon, December 2025.
1167	12-009	The Princess Royal (Civil Service No.41)	1990	1990–2015	St Ives (Carriage)	(Note: Gift of CISPOTEL, built by A1 Shipbuilders / William Osborne, costing £445,432.) MMSI 232003618. Sold 1 June 2016. Renamed Ulidia, workboat with Coleraine Harbour Commissioners, November 2025.
1167	12-009	The Princess Royal (Civil Service No.41)	1990	2015–2016	Relief fleet	MMSI 232003618. Sold 1 June 2016. Renamed Ulidia, workboat with Coleraine Harbour Commissioners, November 2025.
1168	12-010	Lily and Vincent Anthony	1990	1991–2021	Pwllheli (Carriage)	(Note: Legacy of Miss A. Anthony, built by A1 Shipbuilders / Souters, costing £552,881.); Sold November 2023. Renamed Charles Wesley. Workboat (Memorial services) based in Dartmouth, December 2025.
1168	12-010	Lily and Vincent Anthony	1990	2021–2023	Relief fleet	Sold November 2023. Renamed Charles Wesley. Workboat (Memorial services) based in Dartmouth, December 2025.
1169	12-12	Marine Engineer	1991	1990–1995	Relief fleet	(Note: Gift of the Institute of Marine Engineers, built by Green Marine / FBM Ltd, costing £650,000.); Sold January 2024. Last reported at (PUUR), Amsterdam, August 2025.
1169	12-12	Marine Engineer	1991	1995–2018	Bridlington (Carriage)	Sold January 2024. Last reported at (PUUR), Amsterdam, August 2025.
1169	12-12	Marine Engineer	1991	2018–2022	Douglas (Slipway)	Sold January 2024. Last reported at (PUUR), Amsterdam, August 2025.
1170	12-13	Keep Fit Association	1991	1991–2021	Filey (Carriage)	(Note: Funded by the 'Keep Fit Association' LB appeal, the Filey LB appeal, plus other gifts and legacies, built by Green Marine / FBM Ltd, costing £651,481.) MMSI 232056713. Sold May 2024. Renamed Storm Siren II on 21 November 2024. Pilot Boat with Teignmouth Harbour Authority, April 2025.
1170	12-13	Keep Fit Association	1991	2021–2024	Relief fleet	MMSI 232056713. Sold May 2024. Renamed Storm Siren II on 21 November 2024. Pilot Boat with Teignmouth Harbour Authority, April 2025.
1171	12-14	Ann and James Ritchie	1991	1991–2019	Ramsey (Carriage)	(Note: Legacy of Mrs A, Ritchie, built by Green Marine / FBM Ltd, costing £577,746.) MMSI 250013635. Sold 2022. Renamed James Stevens, Pilot Boat at New Ross, Co. Wexford, Ireland, December 2025.
1171	12-14	Ann and James Ritchie	1991	2019–2021	Relief fleet	MMSI 250013635. Sold 2022. Renamed James Stevens, Pilot Boat at New Ross, Co. Wexford, Ireland, December 2025.
1172	12-15	Frank and Lena Clifford of Stourbridge	1991	1992–2023	New Quay (Carriage)	(Note: Legacy of Mr F. Clifford, plus other gifts and legacies, built by Green Marine / FBM Ltd, costing £649,376.) MMSI 232002726. Sold February 2026. Renamed Benjamin Wesley with the Wesley Offshore Group. September 2026.
1172	12-15	Frank and Lena Clifford of Stourbridge	1991	2023–2024	Relief fleet	MMSI 232002726. Sold February 2026. Renamed Benjamin Wesley with the Wesley Offshore Group. September 2026.
1172	12-15	Frank and Lena Clifford of Stourbridge	1991	2024–2025	Douglas (Afloat)	MMSI 232002726. Sold February 2026. Renamed Benjamin Wesley with the Wesley Offshore Group. September 2026.
1173	12-16	Grace Darling	1991	1991–2020	Seahouses (Carriage)	(Note: Funded by the 'Grace Darling Anniversary appeal', plus other gifts and legacies, built by Green Marine / FBM Ltd, costing £652,978.); Sold 2021. See ADES Uruguay below.
1174	12-17	Kingdom of Fife	1991	1991–2024	Anstruther (Carriage)	(Note: Funded by a local appeal, the 'Doctors appeal', the 'Cotton Trust', the legacy of Dr Allen, plus other gifts and legacies, built by Green Marine / FBM Ltd, costing £655,000.) MMSI 232002250. Withdrawn from service, 27 August 2024. Sold April 2025. Renamed Susanna Wesley with the Wesley Offshore Group at Portland, December 2025.
1175	12-18	Fanny Victoria Wilkinson and Frank Stubbs	1991	1991–2016	Scarborough (Carriage)	(Note: Legacy of Mr F. Stubbs, built by Green Marine / FBM Ltd, costing £653,911.); Sold 2018. See Bote Salvavidas de Valparaíso, Chile below:–
1175	12-18	Fanny Victoria Wilkinson and Frank Stubbs	1991	2016–2018	Relief fleet	Sold 2018. See Bote Salvavidas de Valparaíso, Chile below:–
1176	12-19	The Four Boys	1991	1991–1998	Sennen Cove (Slipway)	(Note: Funded by the 'Lands End LB appeal', the 'Sennen Cove' LB appeal, the 'London Broadcasting Co. appeal', plus legacies of Mr Holland and Mrs Hiddleston, and other gifts, built by Green Marine / FBM Ltd, costing £655,250.) MMSI 232020008. Sold 2018. Renamed The Four Boys of Pendennis. Workboat in Falmouth. Sold ????. Renamed Marieanne. Survey Pilot Vessel at Mostyn Docks, December 2024.
1176	12-19	The Four Boys	1991	1998–1999	Relief fleet	MMSI 232020008. Sold 2018. Renamed The Four Boys of Pendennis. Workboat in Falmouth. Sold ????. Renamed Marieanne. Survey Pilot Vessel at Mostyn Docks, December 2024.
1176	12-19	The Four Boys	1991	1999–2016	Amble (Afloat)	MMSI 232020008. Sold 2018. Renamed The Four Boys of Pendennis. Workboat in Falmouth. Sold ????. Renamed Marieanne. Survey Pilot Vessel at Mostyn Docks, December 2024.
1176	12-19	The Four Boys	1991	2016–2017	Relief fleet	MMSI 232020008. Sold 2018. Renamed The Four Boys of Pendennis. Workboat in Falmouth. Sold ????. Renamed Marieanne. Survey Pilot Vessel at Mostyn Docks, December 2024.
1177	12-20	Leonard Kent	1991	1991–2021	Margate (Carriage)	(Note: Legacy of Mr L. F. Kent, plus the Margate LB appeal, plus other gifts and legacies, built by Green Marine / FBM Ltd, costing £629,121.) MMSI 232002280. Retired from service, 18 December 2025. Sold February 2026. Renamed Hetty Wesley with the Wesley Offshore Group. September 2026
1177	12-20	Leonard Kent	1991	2022–2025	Newcastle (Carriage)	MMSI 232002280. Retired from service, 18 December 2025. Sold February 2026. Renamed Hetty Wesley with the Wesley Offshore Group. September 2026
1178	12-21	Margaret Jean	1992	1992–1998	Relief fleet	(Note: Gift of Peter and Jean Bath, built by Green Marine / FBM Ltd, costing £629,121.) MMSI 232002290. Sold 2020. Renamed Arwen Myrtle. At St Peter Port, Guernsey, November 2025.
1178	12-21	Margaret Jean	1992	1998–1999	Lytham St Annes (Carriage)	MMSI 232002290. Sold 2020. Renamed Arwen Myrtle. At St Peter Port, Guernsey, November 2025.
1178	12-21	Margaret Jean	1992	1999–2008	Relief fleet	MMSI 232002290. Sold 2020. Renamed Arwen Myrtle. At St Peter Port, Guernsey, November 2025.
1178	12-21	Margaret Jean	1992	2008–2014	Exmouth (Carriage)	MMSI 232002290. Sold 2020. Renamed Arwen Myrtle. At St Peter Port, Guernsey, November 2025.
1178	12-21	Margaret Jean	1992	2014–2020	Relief fleet	MMSI 232002290. Sold 2020. Renamed Arwen Myrtle. At St Peter Port, Guernsey, November 2025.
1181	12-22	Ruby Clery	1992	1992–2019	Peel (Carriage)	(Note: Gift of Miss R. Clery, built by Green Marine / Souters, costing £662,663.) MMSI 232002727. Retired from service, 30 November 2025. Sold February 2026. Renamed Sukey Wesley with the Wesley Offshore Group. September 2026
1181	12-22	Ruby Clery	1992	2019–2022	Ramsey (Carriage)	MMSI 232002727. Retired from service, 30 November 2025. Sold February 2026. Renamed Sukey Wesley with the Wesley Offshore Group. September 2026
1181	12-22	Ruby Clery	1992	2022–2024	Douglas (Slipway)	MMSI 232002727. Retired from service, 30 November 2025. Sold February 2026. Renamed Sukey Wesley with the Wesley Offshore Group. September 2026
1181	12-22	Ruby Clery	1992	2025	Douglas (Afloat)	MMSI 232002727. Retired from service, 30 November 2025. Sold February 2026. Renamed Sukey Wesley with the Wesley Offshore Group. September 2026
1182	12-23	Robert Charles Brown	1992	1992–2016	Swanage (Slipway)	(Note: Funded by a regional appeal, plus other gifts and legacies, built by Green Marine / FBM Ltd, costing £669,043.) MMSI 244071803. Sold 2019. Renamed Atlantic. As Robert Charles at Zaandam, Netherlands, December 2025.
1182	12-23	Robert Charles Brown	1992	2016–2019	Relief fleet	MMSI 244071803. Sold 2019. Renamed Atlantic. As Robert Charles at Zaandam, Netherlands, December 2025.
1183	12-24	Lil Cunningham	1992	1992–2019	Rhyl (Carriage)	(Note: Gift of Miss B. H. I. Cunningham, built by Green Marine / Souters, costing £640,092.) MMSI 232002741. Sold 2020. Renamed Ellen Rodger. Workboat with Calypso Marine, Stored Burntisland, Fife, June 2025.
1184	12-25	Bingo Lifeline	1992	1992–2020	Relief fleet	(Note: Gift of the Bingo Assoc. of Gt. Britain, the legacy of Mrs A. Mills, gift of the Royal Bank of Scotland plc, plus other gifts and legacies, built by Green Marine / FBM Ltd, costing £660,000.); Sold 2021. See ADES Uruguay below.
1185	12-26	Moira Barrie	1992	1992–2019	Barmouth (Carriage)	(Note: Legacy of Miss M. Barrie, plus other gifts and legacies, built by Green Marine / William Osborne, costing £683,097.) MMSI 232030482. Sold 2020. Renamed Arwen, Ferry Boat for Western Isles Cruises, Mallaig. Sold ????. Renamed MV Acua Ocean. Workboat for ACUA Ocean Ltd, operating from Plymouth, Devon, December 2025.
1186	12-27	Pride and Spirit	1992	1992–2014	Dungeness (Carriage)	(Note: Gift of Mr and Mrs E, Cass, built by Green Marine / Souters, costing £645,034.); Sold 2021. See ADES Uruguay below.
1186	12-27	Pride and Spirit	1992	2014–2016	Clifden (Afloat)	Sold 2021. See ADES Uruguay below.
1186	12-27	Pride and Spirit	1992	2016–2019	Relief fleet	Sold 2021. See ADES Uruguay below.
1187	12-28	Mary Margaret	1992	1992–2004	Kilmore Quay (Afloat)	(Note: Legacies of Mr D. A. S. Williams and Mrs M. M. Williams, built by Green Marine / William Osborne, costing £678,261.); Sold 2023. Renamed Pisces, March 2024. Workboat, Yarmouth, IOW, December 2025.
1187	12-28	Mary Margaret	1992	2004–2019	Relief fleet	Sold 2023. Renamed Pisces, March 2024. Workboat, Yarmouth, IOW, December 2025.
1187	12-28	Mary Margaret	1992	2019–2022	Peel (Afloat)	Sold 2023. Renamed Pisces, March 2024. Workboat, Yarmouth, IOW, December 2025.
1187	12-28	Mary Margaret	1992	2022–2023	Relief fleet	Sold 2023. Renamed Pisces, March 2024. Workboat, Yarmouth, IOW, December 2025.
1188	12-29	Eleanor and Bryant Girling	1992	1993–2022	Newcastle (Carriage)	(Note: Legacy of Mrs E, B. Girling, built by Green Marine / FBM Ltd, costing £704,230.) MMSI 244729436. Sold 2022. Renamed The Mersey (3-YG-894). At Leeuwarden, Netherlands, May 2025.
1188	12-29	Eleanor and Bryant Girling	1992	2022	Relief fleet	MMSI 244729436. Sold 2022. Renamed The Mersey (3-YG-894). At Leeuwarden, Netherlands, May 2025.
1189	12-30	Her Majesty The Queen	1992	1993–1996	Relief fleet	(Note: Funded from the appeal to the Police Forces of Gt. Britain, plus other gifts and legacies, built by Green Marine / Souters, costing £650,000.); On display at Chatham Historic Dockyard, 2023. Returned to RNLI HQ at Poole, 2024. Now on permanent display at the RNLI College, June 2026.
1189	12-30	Her Majesty The Queen	1992	1996–1999	Cromer (Carriage)	On display at Chatham Historic Dockyard, 2023. Returned to RNLI HQ at Poole, 2024. Now on permanent display at the RNLI College, June 2026.
1189	12-30	Her Majesty The Queen	1992	1999	Relief fleet	On display at Chatham Historic Dockyard, 2023. Returned to RNLI HQ at Poole, 2024. Now on permanent display at the RNLI College, June 2026.
1189	12-30	Her Majesty The Queen	1992	1999–2018	Lytham St Annes (Carriage)	On display at Chatham Historic Dockyard, 2023. Returned to RNLI HQ at Poole, 2024. Now on permanent display at the RNLI College, June 2026.
1189	12-30	Her Majesty The Queen	1992	2018–2021	Relief fleet	On display at Chatham Historic Dockyard, 2023. Returned to RNLI HQ at Poole, 2024. Now on permanent display at the RNLI College, June 2026.
1190	12-31	Doris Bleasdale	1992	1993–2019	Clogherhead (Carriage)	(Note: Legacy of Mrs D. Bleasdale, built by Green Marine / William Osborne, costing £671,910.) MMSI 232031477. Sold 2020. Renamed Knot on Call, December 2022. Pleasure boat at Tenby, Pembrokeshire. Sold April 2025. Renamed John Jacques, Pilot boat at Glasson Dock, August 2025.
1191	12-32	Joy and Charles Beeby	1992	1993–2023	Berwick-upon-Tweed (Slipway)	(Note: Legacy of Mr C. Beeby, built by Green Marine / FBM Ltd, costing £680,000.); Sold July 2024. Renamed John Wesley, Workboat (memorial services), based in Dartmouth, Devon, April 2025.
1191	12-32	Joy and Charles Beeby	1992	2023–2024	Douglas (Slipway)	Sold July 2024. Renamed John Wesley, Workboat (memorial services), based in Dartmouth, Devon, April 2025.
1191	12-32	Joy and Charles Beeby	1992	2024	Relief fleet	Sold July 2024. Renamed John Wesley, Workboat (memorial services), based in Dartmouth, Devon, April 2025.
1192	12-33	Fisherman's Friend	1993	1993–1999	Relief fleet	(Note: Funded from the special appeal by Lofthouse of Fleetwood Ltd, plus other gifts and legacies, built by Green Marine / Souters, costing £650,000.) MMSI 232002576. Sold 2020. Survey Vessel, Galway, Ireland, Crosshaven, March 2024.
1192	12-33	Fisherman's Friend	1993	1999	Lytham St Annes (Carriage)	MMSI 232002576. Sold 2020. Survey Vessel, Galway, Ireland, Crosshaven, March 2024.
1192	12-33	Fisherman's Friend	1993	1999–2016	Relief fleet	MMSI 232002576. Sold 2020. Survey Vessel, Galway, Ireland, Crosshaven, March 2024.
1192	12-33	Fisherman's Friend	1993	2016–2019	Clifden (Afloat)	MMSI 232002576. Sold 2020. Survey Vessel, Galway, Ireland, Crosshaven, March 2024.
1193	12-34	Freddie Cooper	1992	1993–2024	Aldeburgh (Carriage)	(Note: Legacy of Mrs W. M. Cooper, built by Green Marine / FBM Ltd, costing £674,776.) MMSI 232003208. Withdrawn from service, 14 October 2024. Departure from Aldeburgh, 27 October 2024. Sold Feb 2025. Renamed Mary Wesley, Workboat (Memorial services) based at Portland, March 2025.
1194	12-35	Inchcape	1993	1993–2024	Arbroath (Slipway)	(Note: Funded by a local appeal, plus other gifts and legacies, built by Green Marine / FBM Ltd, costing £680,000.); Withdrawn from service, 17 March 2024. Sold 2024. Renamed Emilia Wesley, workboat (Memorial services), based at Portland Marina, September 2025.
1195	12-36	Royal Thames	1993	1993–2012	Eastbourne (Afloat)	(Note: Funded by the Royal Thames Yacht Club appeal, a generous anonymous gift, plus other gifts and legacies, built by Green Marine / William Osborne, costing £680,000.); Sold Jan 2021. Renamed Sea Searcher, Survey Safety Vessel with deeperdorset.co.uk. Sold Oct 2022?. Survey Safety / Dive Vessel at Holyhead. For Sale, Oct 2026.
1195	12-36	Royal Thames	1993	2012–2018	Leverburgh (Afloat)	Sold Jan 2021. Renamed Sea Searcher, Survey Safety Vessel with deeperdorset.co.uk. Sold Oct 2022?. Survey Safety / Dive Vessel at Holyhead. For Sale, Oct 2026.
1195	12-36	Royal Thames	1993	2018	Relief fleet	Sold Jan 2021. Renamed Sea Searcher, Survey Safety Vessel with deeperdorset.co.uk. Sold Oct 2022?. Survey Safety / Dive Vessel at Holyhead. For Sale, Oct 2026.
1196	12-37	Silvia Burrell	1993	1993–2018	Girvan (Afloat)	(Note: Legacy of Miss S. Burrell, built by Green Marine / Souters, costing £680,000.); Sold August 2021. Renamed Ailsa Craig. At Island Harbour Marina, IOW, October 2025.

=== Uruguay ===
ADES Uruguay is an Honorary Lifesaving Institution founded in 1955. Its volunteers train weekly to go to sea with the sole purpose of helping whoever requests help. The rescues have no cost to the beneficiaries. At the national level ADES Uruguay is part of the National Emergency Committee and at the international level it is part of the IMRF (International Maritime Rescue Federation)

RNLI ON	Name	In Service	Station	MMSI	Comments
1173	ADES 28 Grace Darling	2021–	Colonia del Sacramento	232002240	
1184	ADES 29 BROU 125 Anniversario	2021–	Montevideo	232002573	
1186	ADES 30	2021–	Punta del Este	232003202	

=== Chile ===
Operated by Bote Salvavidas de Valparaíso, Chile

RNLI ON	Name	In Service	Station	Comments
1175	Valparaiso IV	2018–	Valparaíso	Images of 12-28 in Chile are here, still in near RNLI colours.

== See also ==
- Royal National Lifeboat Institution lifeboats
