= Peel Lifeboat Station =

RNLI lifeboat station on the Isle of Man

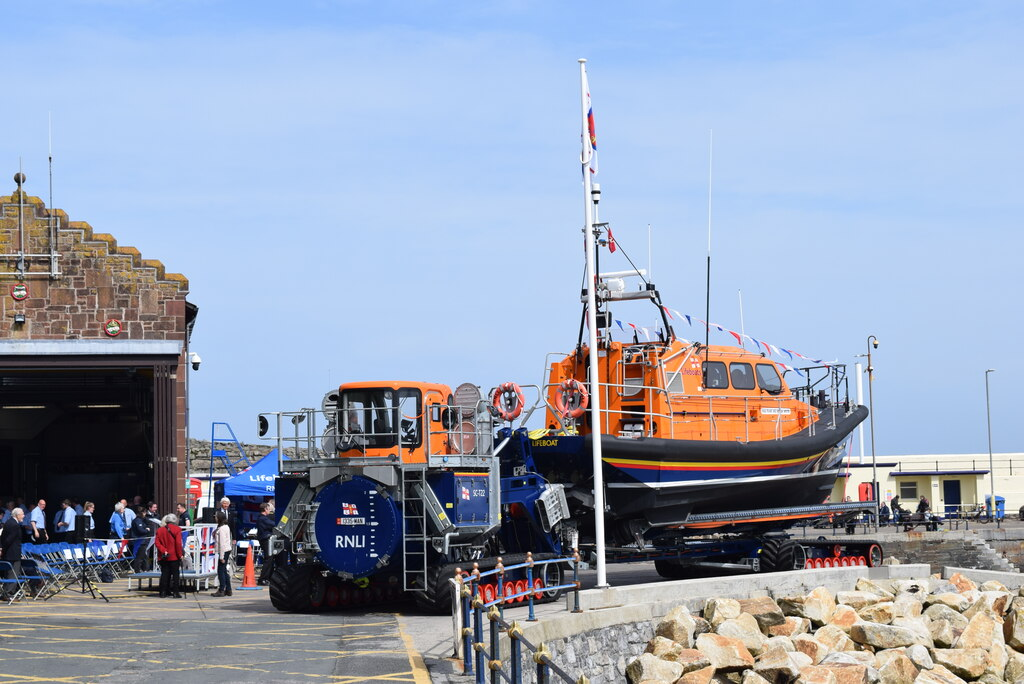
- Peel Lifeboat Station

- Location within Isle of Man

General information
- Type: RNLI Lifeboat Station
- Location: The Breakwater, Peel, IM5 1TG, Isle of Man
- Coordinates: 54°13′37″N 4°41′52.5″W
- Opened: 1828–1843; 1885–present
- Owner: Royal National Lifeboat Institution

Website
- Peel RNLI Lifeboat Station

Peel Lifeboat Station is located in the shadow of Peel Castle on St Patrick's Isle, in the city of Peel, on the west coast of the Isle of Man, a British Crown Dependency.

A lifeboat was first stationed at Peel by the Royal National Institute for the Preservation of Life from Shipwreck (RNIPLS) in 1828.

Re-established by the Royal National Lifeboat Institution (RNLI) in 1885, the station currently operates an Shannon-class All-weather lifeboat, 13-35 Frank and Brenda Winter (ON 1342), on station since 2021.

== History ==
On the 28 May 1828, Sir William Hillary, President of the Isle of Man District Association of the Royal National Institute for the Preservation of Life from Shipwreck, wrote to the associations headquarters in London, requesting that a lifeboat be placed at both Peel and Ramsey, which was duly agreed.

A new boat was provided for Peel, a 26 ft (7.9 m) 6-oared Palmer-class lifeboat, built by Taylor of Blackwall, London, which cost £55, and arrived in Peel on 12 December 1828. Records show only one service, in 1831, to rescue the four crew of the sloop Jane. By 1836, for reasons unknown, the boat was recorded as wrecked.

A replacement boat was commissioned with local boat-builder William Corlett, again a 26-foot "Palmer" inspired type boat. No services were ever recorded, and by 1843, this boat was also recorded as being unserviceable. With little funding available from the Institution in decline, there seemed to be no interest in maintaining a lifeboat in Peel, despite the large number of fishing boats operating there.

In 1883, Spencer Walpole, Lieutenant Governor of the Isle of Man, wrote to the (now) RNLI, to request that a lifeboat station be re-established at Peel, highlighting that the long range of coast from Port Erin to Ramsey was unprotected by any lifeboat. A new boathouse was built next to the castle in 1884 by Redcliffe and Anderson, at a cost of £485-9s-10d, and in 1885, a new 37 ft (11 m) 12-oared boat arrived, built by Woolfe of Shadwell, and costing £397. The lifeboat was towed to the Island from Liverpool by the Isle of Man Steam Packet Company vessel Ellan Vannin. The lifeboat was funded from the legacy of Capt. John Monk, RN, of Neston, Wirral, a retired naval officer, who first saw action in the Napoleonic Wars. He bequeathed £500 to the RNLI "for the purpose of building a life boat". In a grand ceremony on 14 October 1885, which coincided with the opening of the new Royal Naval Reserve Artillery battery on Creg Malin, the lifeboat was named John Monk"

The John Monk was withdrawn from service in 1895 having been condemned, and was broken up in 1896. A reserve lifeboat was stationed at Peel between 1895 and 1897. Unusually, the name of the boat was unrecorded, even though two services were recorded, to the schooner Lily Garton of Peel on 12 December 1895, and the smack Orion of Ramsey on 20 February 1897. The only two 37-foot reserve lifeboats in operation at the time, were the May (ON 196), and the William Erle (ON 296).

After years of launching Peel lifeboats by hand, Peel received their first launch and recovery tractor, a Case LA (T41) in 1963.

Following a coastal service review, the All-weather lifeboat was withdrawn in 1972, replaced with an A-class (McLachlan) Inshore lifeboat. A second McLachlan lifeboat followed, and then two B-class (Atlantic 21) lifeboats. In 1990, another coastal review determined that an All-weather boat would once again be placed at Peel, whilst Port Erin would receive an Atlantic 21 Inshore boat to replace their Rother-class All-weather lifeboat.

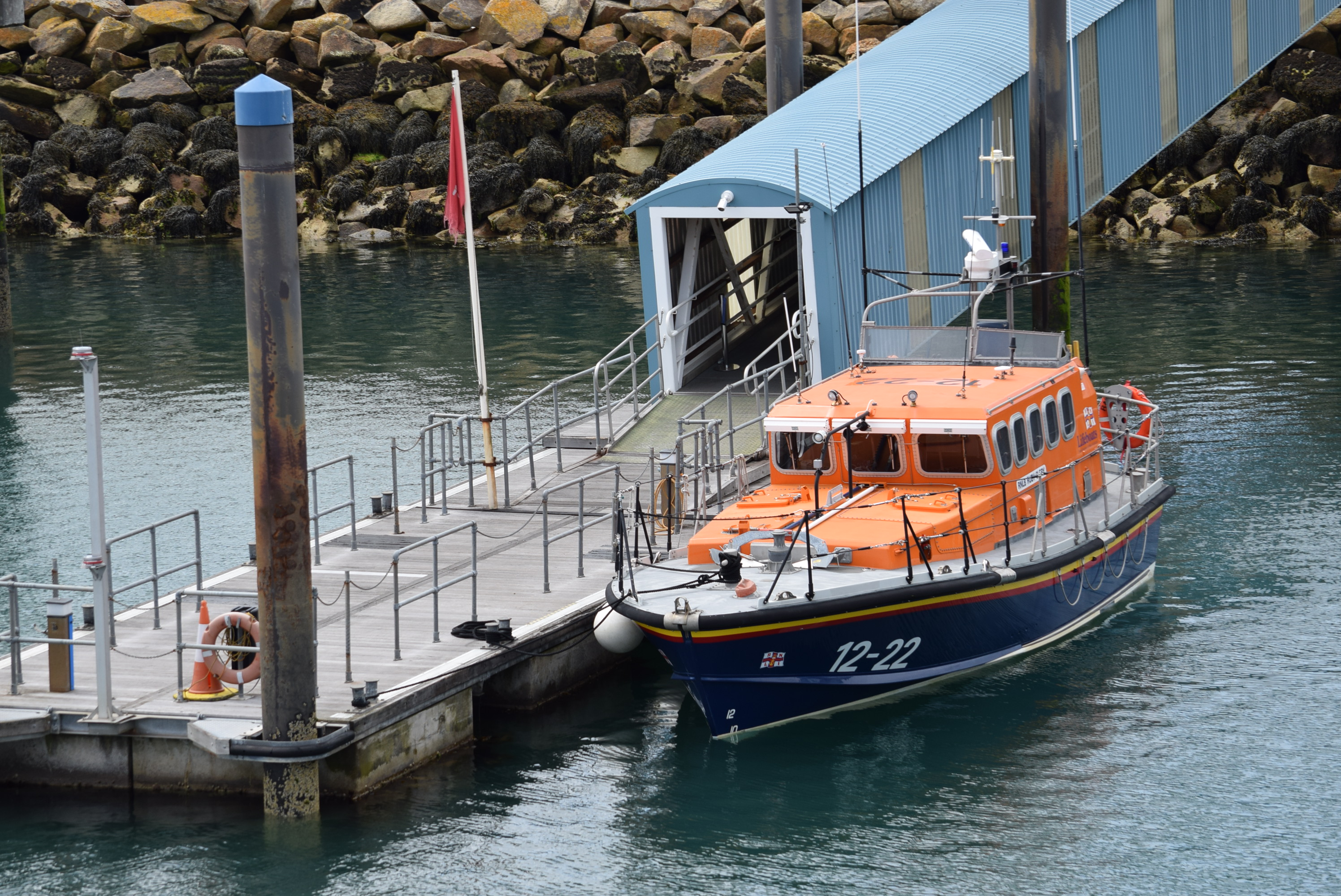
Mersey-class All-weather lifeboat 12-22 Ruby Clery (ON 1181)

In 1992, Peel's new Mersey-class lifeboat arrived, costing £662,663, and was named 12-22 Ruby Clery (ON 1181), following a generous bequest from the late Miss R. A. Clery of St. John's Wood, London, a great-great-granddaughter of Sir William Hillary. The naming ceremony took place on 12 September 1992, and was carried out by Mrs Karin Bache Nordli, the daughter of the baby rescued off the St George in 1889 (see St George of Norway).

The 1884 boathouse had to be demolished to make way for a new building for the Mersey lifeboat and tractor, but much of the original red sandstone was retained and re-used in the construction of the new building.

Ruby Clery served Peel for the next 27 years, before being transferred first to Ramsey, and then onto Douglas. Peel received a new Shannon-class lifeboat in 2020, although it was 2021 before she was formally accepted on service, delays in training being caused with the COVID-19 pandemic. The boathouse once again required modifications, being extended on the North side, with larger access doors fitted, new workshop facilities, and a crew room mezzanine above the boat hall, with lookout windows.

In the 2022 Birthday Honours, Frank Horne, former Peel Coxswain, and RNLI Sea Safety Manager, was awarded the MBE.

On the morning of Sunday 13 April 2025, the station was visited by Ethan Perry, seeking advice about his new motorboat, and if in trouble, how to make a Mayday call. Unknown to everyone at the time, it was essential advice. That Mayday call would come the same day. Fortunately, the lifeboat was already in the water, out on exercise for crew training. Coxswain Mike Faragher made best speed to the location, where a boat was found partially submerged, with Ethan in the water, unconscious. The young man was recovered from the water, and CPR was carried out by several of the crew, until the lifeboat was back in Peel, and the casualty handed to the care of the paramedics. After several weeks in hospital, the man made a full recovery.

== St George of Norway ==
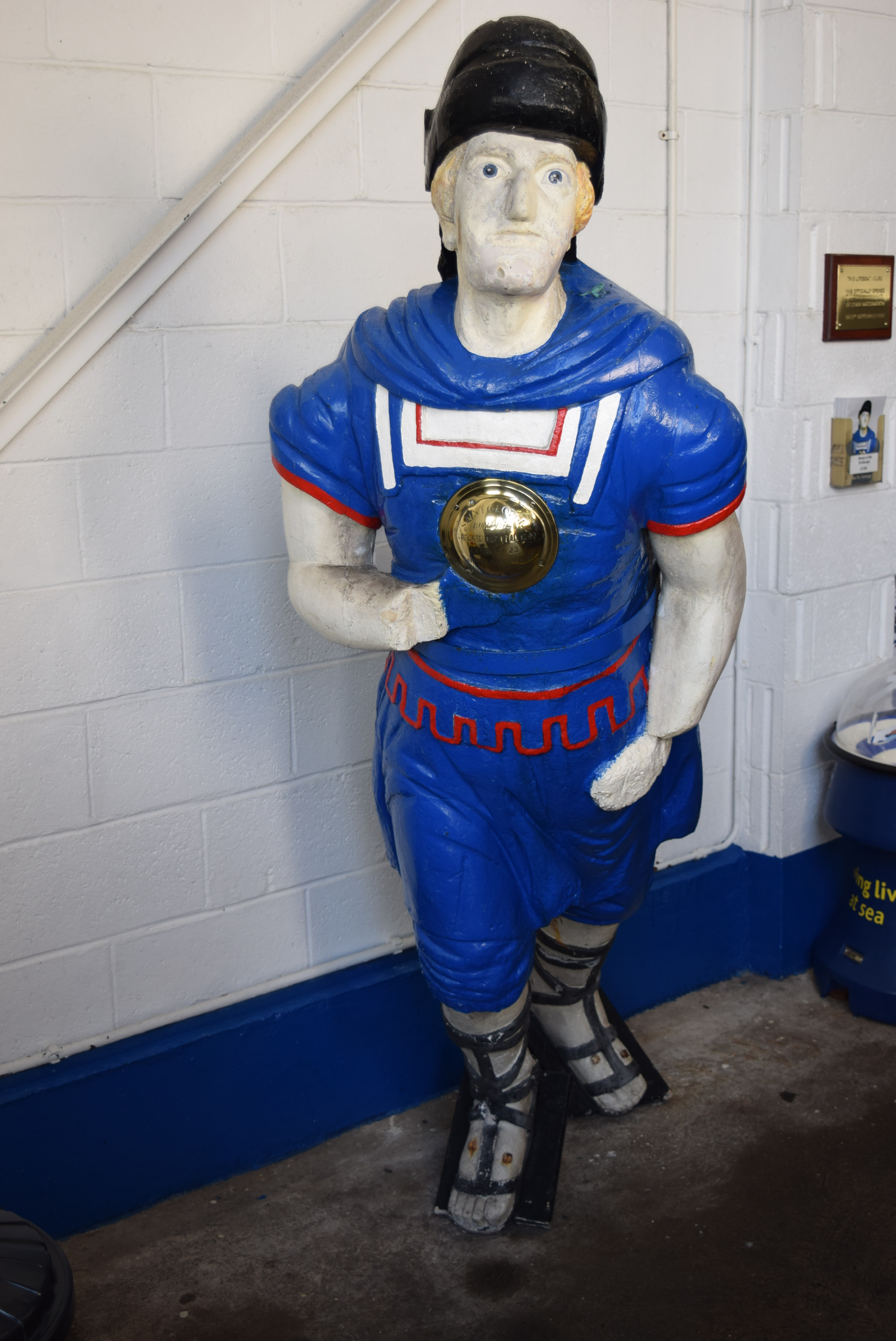
Figurehead "George" off the Norwegian vessel St George

On the 7 October 1889, a large fully-rigged ship was seen in trouble off Peel, badly damaged, with broken masts. The John Monk was launched into the full fury of the storm. It took a full two hours to reach the St. George, a Norwegian ship bound for Montevideo. Unable to get close, a Breeches buoy system was set up, and one by one, the Captain, his wife and baby, and 20 crew, were rescued.

The lifeboat hadn't reached Peel Harbour on the return trip, before the St George was driven ashore and wrecked. The survivors were landed on the quay to the cheers of a large assembled crowd.

For this service, Coxswain Charles Cain and the 15 lifeboat crew each received a Silver Medal from the Norwegian Government, and a Manx bible. The figurehead off the boat, "George", was recovered and has been proudly on display at Peel Lifeboat Station ever since.

== Station honours ==
The following are awards made at Peel

- Silver Medal, awarded by the Norwegian Government
- Manx Bible, presented by John Bardsley Bishop of Sodor and Man
  Charles Cain, Coxswain – 1890
  Angus Cain – 1890
  James Cain – 1890
  John Callister – 1890
  John Cook – 1890
  Caesar Gorry – 1890
  Henry Gorry – 1890
  John Gorry – 1890
  James Hughes – 1890
  John Hughes – 1890
  H. Kaighen – 1890
  Joseph McMurdoch – 1890
  William Quillam – 1890
  John Quirk – 1890
  John Sayle – 1890
  William Williamson – 1890
- 'The Thanks of the Institution inscribed on Vellum'
  Charles Cain II, Coxswain – 1910
  Thomas Quirk – 1921
  John Kissack – 1921
  Patrick Gorry – 1926
  W. E. Gorry, Coxswain – 1970
  Edward Allen, Helm – 1980
  Brian Maddrell, Helm – 1980
  Frank Horne, crew member – 1995
- Vellum Service Certificates
  John Keig – 1980
  Philip Quane – 1980
  Barry Horne – 1980
  James Coulson – 1980
  David Eames, Coxswain – 1995
  Paul Jones, Second Coxswain – 1995
  Paul Cain, Motor Mechanic – 1995
  Tim Crookhall, crew member – 1995
  John Hunter, crew member – 1995
  Colin Makin, crew member – 1995
  Andrew Quane, crew member – 1995
- Commendation awarded by the Chief Executive of the Institution
  Mike Faragher, Coxswain – 2026
  Juan Owens, crew member – 2026
- Medical Commendation awarded by the Institution
  Mike Faragher, Coxswain – 2026
  Jason Spooner, crew member – 2026
  Chloe Katie Spooner, crew member – 2026
  Will Senior, crew member – 2026
  Neil Moore, crew member – 2026
  Tony Elder, crew member – 2026
- Member, Order of the British Empire (MBE)
  Frank Horne – 2022QBH

== Peel lifeboats ==
=== Pulling and Sailing (P&S) lifeboats ===
ON (Note: ON is the RNLI's Official Number of the boat.)	Name	Built	On station	Class	Comments
Pre-133	Unnamed	1828	1828–1836	26-foot Palmer	(Note: 26 ft 0 in (7.92 m) x 6 ft 3 in (1.91 m) (6-oared) Palmer-class lifeboat, funded by the RNIPLS, built by Taylor of Blackwall, London, costing £55.); Wrecked in 1836.
Pre-173	Unnamed	1836	1836–c.1843	26-foot 'Palmer type'	(Note: 26 ft 0 in (7.92 m) x 6 ft 3 in (1.91 m) (6-oared) Palmer-type lifeboat, funded from local subscription, built locally by William Corlett of Peel.); Sold in 1843.
83	John Monk	1884	1885–1895	37-foot self-righting (P&S)	(Note: 37 ft 0 in (11.28 m) x 9 ft 0 in (2.74 m) (12-oared) self-righting (P&S) lifeboat, legacy of Capt. Monk, RN, built by Woolfe of Shadwell, London, costing £397.); Broken up in 1896.
–	Reserve Lifeboat	–	1895–1897	–	(Note: Unrecorded reserve lifeboat, on station for 2 years)
396	Mayhew Medwin	1897	1897–1925	37-foot self-righting (P&S)	(Note: 37 ft 0 in (11.28 m) x 9 ft 3 in (2.82 m) (10-oared) self-righting (P&S) lifeboat, legacy of Dr A. G. Medwin of London, built by Roberts of Mevagissey, costing £485.); Sold in 1925.
634	Henry Kirk	1912	1925–1937	37-foot self-righting (P&S)	(Note: 37 ft 0 in (11.28 m) x 9 ft 3 in (2.82 m) (10-oared) self-righting (P&S) lifeboat, legacy of Mr H. Kirk of Beeston, built by Thames Ironworks of Blackwall, London, costing £1,239 when new.); Previously at Port Erin. Sold in 1937. Renamed Peal o'Bells. Last reported at Southampton in 1948.

Pre ON numbers are unofficial numbers used by the Lifeboat Enthusiasts' Society to reference early lifeboats not included on the official RNLI list.

=== Motor lifeboats ===
ON	Op.No. (Note: Op. No. is the RNLI's Operational Number of the boat carried on the hull.)	Name	Built	On station	Class	Comments
799	–	Helen Sutton	1937	1937–1952	Liverpool	
903	–	Helena Harris - Manchester & District XXXI	1952	1952–1966	Liverpool	
893	–	Clara and Emily Barwell	1951	1966	Liverpool	Relief lifeboat
903	–	Helena Harris - Manchester & District XXXI	1952	1966–1972	Liverpool	
All-weather lifeboat withdrawn 1972–1992
1181	12-22	Ruby Clery	1992	1992–2019	Mersey	Transferred to Ramsey.
1187	12-28	Mary Margaret	1992	2019–2021	Mersey	
1342	13-35	Frank and Brenda Winter	2019	2021–	Shannon	

More post-service details can be found on the respective lifeboat class pages.

=== Inshore lifeboats ===
Op.No.	Name	On station	Class	Comments
A-506	Unnamed	1972	A-class (McLachlan)	(Note: Formerly 18-006 under ALB designation)
A-507	Unnamed	1973–1976	A-class (McLachlan)	(Note: Formerly 18-007 under ALB designation)
B-536	Unnamed	1976–1989	B-class (Atlantic 21)	
B-575	John Batstone	1989–1992	B-class (Atlantic 21)	

Inshore lifeboat withdrawn in 1992

=== Launch and recovery tractors ===
Op.No.	Reg. No.	Type	On station	Comments
T41	JXR 66	Case LA	1963–1970	
T54	MJT 722P	Case LA	1970–1973	
T43	JXR 934	Case LA	1973–1978	
TW07	MAN 49W	Talus MB 764 County	1978–1988	
TW06	BMN 476L	Talus MB 764 County	1988–1992	
T114	1222 MN	Talus MB-H Crawler	1992–2004	
T111	1222 MN	Talus MB-H Crawler	2004–2019	
T108	1222 MN	Talus MB-H Crawler	2019–2021	
SC-T22	1335 MAN	SLARS (Clayton)	2020–	

== See also ==
- List of RNLI stations
- List of former RNLI stations
- Royal National Lifeboat Institution lifeboats
