= Ramsey Lifeboat Station =

RNLI lifeboat station on the Isle of Man

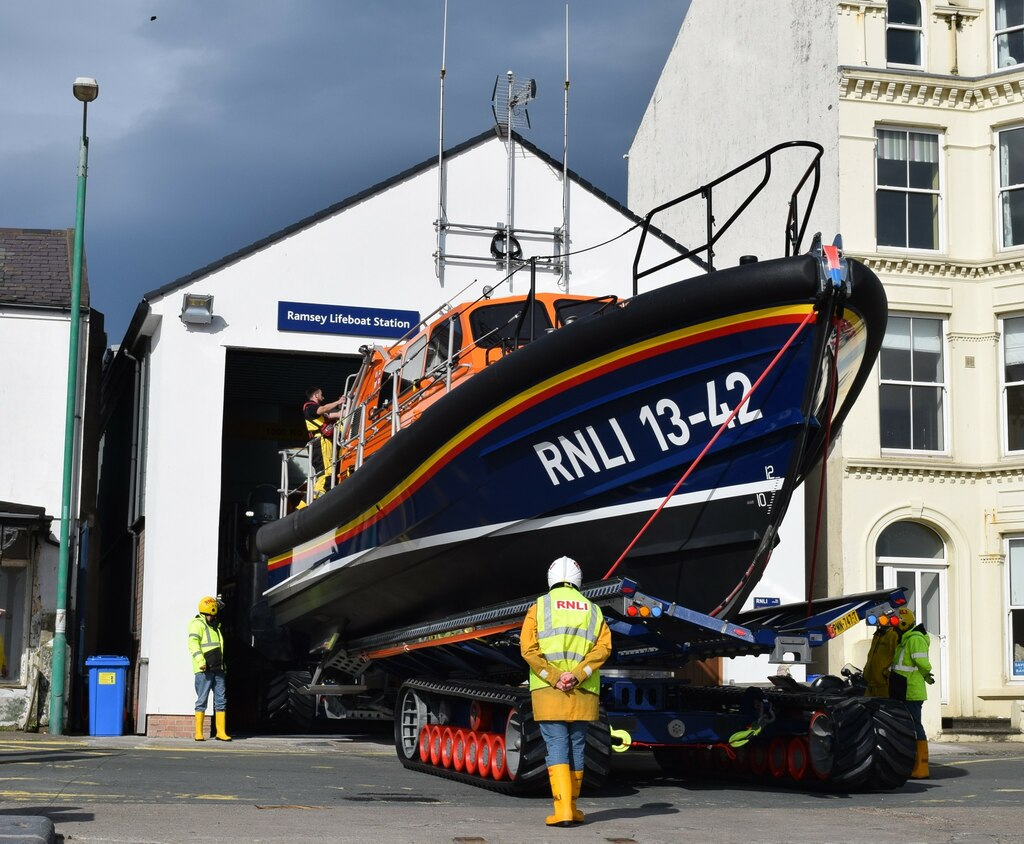
- Ramsey Lifeboat Station

- Location within Isle of Man

General information
- Type: RNLI Lifeboat Station
- Location: Queens Promenade, Ramsey, IM8 1BH, Isle of Man
- Coordinates: 54°19′21.5″N 4°22′42″W
- Opened: 1829 & 1868
- Owner: Royal National Lifeboat Institution

Website
- Ramsey RNLI Lifeboat Station

Ramsey Lifeboat Station is located on Queens Promenade, in Ramsey, a town overlooking Ramsey Bay, approximately 15 miles (24 km) north of Douglas, on the Isle of Man, a British Crown Dependency.

A lifeboat was first stationed at Ramsey by the Royal National Institution for the Preservation of Life from Shipwreck (RNIPLS) in 1829. The station was re-established by the Royal National Lifeboat Institution (RNLI) in 1868.

The station currently operates a Shannon-class All-weather lifeboat, 13-42 Ann and James Ritchie II (ON 1349), on station since 2022.

== History ==
On 28 May 1828, Sir William Hillary, President of the Isle of Man District Association of the RNIPLS, wrote to the Institution's headquarters in London, requesting that a lifeboat be placed at both Peel and Ramsey, which was duly agreed.

The first lifeboat for Ramsey was a Palmer-class non-self-righting 10-oared lifeboat, built by Harton of London, and purchased for £55. She was completed in November 1828, and transported to Ramsey aboard HM Cutter Industry, arriving on 20 February 1829. There are no records to show that the boat was ever launched on service. By the 1840s, the boat was in disrepair. Following the death in 1848 of Sir William Hillary, the driving force behind the RNIPLS, and with little or no funding available, Ramsey lifeboat station effectively ceased.

In 1854, a rejuvenated RNIPLS became the Royal National Lifeboat Institution (RNLI). In 1868, the Lieutenant governor of the Isle of Man wrote to the RNLI to request that a station be re-established at Ramsey, which was agreed. An order was placed with Forrestt of Limehouse, London, who built a 33-foot (10 metre) ten-oared self-righting lifeboat, provided by the gift of Mr James Ryder, via the Manchester Branch of the RNLI, and which was delivered to Ramsey in November 1868. A boat house had also been commissioned, built by Y. Gallow on the Esplanade, at a cost of £145, which was completed in September 1869. A naming ceremony was then held on 28 September 1869, when Miss Christian of Milltown named the boat Two Sisters, after the daughters of Mr Ryder. She was launched 42 times and saved 117 lives.

Following the Mexico disaster, when 27 lifeboat men from Southport and St Annes lost their lives in December 1886, and with concerns raised regarding older self-righting boats, a replacement lifeboat was ordered for Ramsey. A new 37-foot 12-oared self-righting lifeboat was built by Hansen of Cowes, costing £421, arriving in Ramsey in August 1888. The boat, carriage and all equipment was funded by Mr and Mrs Norbury of Port Lewaigue, near Ramsey, and she was named Mary Isabella (ON 222). She was launched twice on service in 1889, but the coxswain and crew were unhappy with her seaworthiness, and the boat was sent back for alterations. The Two Sisters returned to service, performing another 7 rescues, and saving 30 lives.

Also in 1889, a new boathouse was proposed, complete with a first floor committee room, and living accommodation above for the coxswain and his family. In all, the boathouse and the slipway opposite cost over £1700, and with £300 once again donated by Mr and Mrs Norbury, the Norbury Boathouse was opened in February 1890.

It was only in January 1891 that the Mary Isabella returned to Ramsey. She was launched 28 times, and saved 90 people, but was holed during a launch off the quay in February 1895, repairs taking three days, and in April that year it was decided to replace her. Hansen of Cowes built a 10-oared self-righting boat, which was delivered to Ramsey in April 1896. Costing £551, and once again funded by Mr and Mrs Norbury, she was also named Mary Isabella (ON 391).

=== 20th century ===
Another name that has become synonymous with Ramsey lifeboats is the name Ritchie. Keen seafarers James and Ann Ritchie, of the Isle of Man brewing company Heron and Brearley, decided to fund a lifeboat for Ramsey. Oakley-class lifeboat James Ball Ritchie (ON 995) arrived on service in 1970, shortly after James' death.

His widow, Ann Ritchie, née Gough, President of the Ramsey Ladies Lifeboat Guild, decided to fund two more lifeboats: one for Port St Mary, and one went to Oban. After her death in 1990, the residue of her estate became the Gough Ritchie Charitable Trust. One third of its income is distributed to the RNLI for use in the Isle of Man.

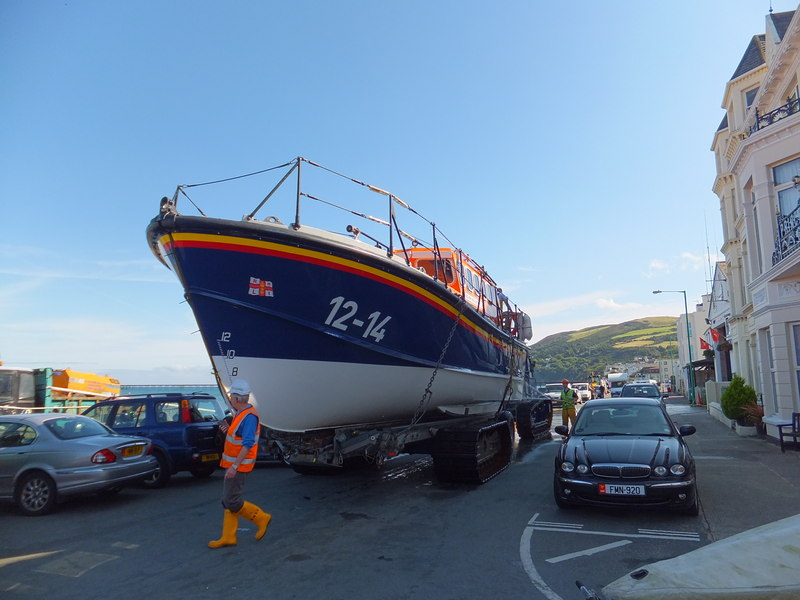
Mersey-class lifeboat 12-14 Ann and James Ritchie (ON 1171)

In 1991, a second boat for Ramsey was provided, Mersey-class lifeboat 12-14 Ann and James Ritchie (ON 1171). To accommodate the new boat, the Norbury Boathouse, which had been in use for 96 years, was demolished to make way for a new building, The New Norbury Boathouse. This building provided a larger space for the new lifeboat, along with improved crew facilities and a souvenir shop.

Ann and James Ritchie was retired in 2019, and Mersey-class lifeboat 12-22 Ruby Clery (ON 1181), formerly at Peel, was placed on service until the arrival of Ramsey's new Shannon-class lifeboat in 2022. Once again, more construction work was required at the boathouse to accommodate the new boat and SLARS launch system. The work included removal of the front elevation to extend the building, installing a ground source heat pump system, and internal layout reconfiguration with updated crew facilities.

Shannon-class lifeboat 13-42 Ann and James Ritchie II (ON 1349) arrived in Ramsey in 2022. She is the sixth lifeboat funded by James and Ann Ritchie, and the Gough Ritchie Charitable Foundation.

== Notable rescues ==
On the 7 November 1890. the Two Sisters was launched in rough seas to the steam dredger Walter Bibby, rescuing the 15 men on board. Only 4 days later, in similarly poor weather, the Two Sisters was launched again, this time to the vessel Margaret, travelling from Runcorn to Belfast. Her three-man crew were landed safely. For these two actions, Edward Christian Kerr, Honorary Secretary, and Robert Garett, Coxswain, were awarded the RNLI Silver Medal.

The Aberdeen steam trawler Strathairlie ran aground at Skellig Bay north of Ramsey, on the night of 20 November 1941. Ramsey lifeboat Lady Harrison was launched to their aid. Unable to get close enough, a cable system was run to the trawler, and 15 men were rescued in turn. John Comish, Coxswain, was awarded the RNLI Bronze Medal.

== Station honours ==
The following are awards made at Ramsey

- Sea Gallantry Bronze Medal
  Harry Sharpe – 1918
- RNIPLS Silver Medal
  John Covin – 1845
- RNLI Silver Medal
  Robert Fell, Coxswain – 1883
  Edward C. Kerr, Honorary Secretary – 1890
  Robert Garrett, Coxswain – 1890
- Silver Medal awarded by the Finnish Government
  Jack T. Lord, Coxswain – 1937
- RNLI Bronze Medal
  John Comish, Coxswain – 1942
- Bronze Medals awarded by the Finnish Government
  Ramsey Lifeboat Crew – 1937
- 'The Thanks of the Institution inscribed on Vellum'
  Ernest Starkey, Acting Motor Mechanic – 1942
  James Kinnin, Coxswain – 1986
  James Kinnin, Coxswain – 1993
- Vellum Service Certificate
  Douglas Martin, Second Coxswain – 1986
  Ronald Crowe, Assistant Motor Mechanic – 1986
  Gerald Evison, Emergency Mechanic – 1986
  Kevin Crowe, crew member – 1986
  Alan Christian, crew member – 1986
  Kim Holland, crew member – 1986
  Anthony Gaines, crew member – 1986
  Raymond Stanfield, Second Coxswain – 1993
  Mark Kenyon, Assistant Mechanic – 1993
  Kevin Christian, crew member – 1993
  Kim Holland, crew member – 1993
  Robert Wade, crew member – 1993
- 'A Letter of Appreciation signed by the Director of the Institution'
  Juan Sable, Tractor Driver – 1993
  Mervyn Sims, Asst. Tractor Driver – 1993
- Certificate on Vellum, awarded by the Royal Humane Society
  R. E. Wilkinson, reserve crew member – 1968
- Member, Order of the British Empire (MBE)
  William Reginald Edwards, Honorary Secretary – 1966NYH
  James Kinnin, Coxswain – 1997QBH
  Kevin Andrew Christian, Volunteer Operations Manager – 2012QBH
  Stewart Mark Kenyon, Coxswain – 2020QBH
- British Empire Medal
  William Frank Cottier, Coxswain – 1971QBH
  James Harold Kneale, Mechanic – 1987QBH

== Ramsey lifeboats ==
=== Pulling and Sailing (P&S) lifeboats ===
ON (Note: ON is the RNLI's Official Number of the boat.)	Name	Built	On station	Class	Comments
–	Unnamed	1829	1829–c.1840	28-foot Palmer	(Note: 28 ft 0 in (8.53 m) x 6 ft 9 in (2.06 m) (10/12-oared) Palmer-class lifeboat, funded by the IOM district association, built by Harton of Limehouse, London, costing £55.)
Pre-513	Two Sisters	1868	1868–1888	33-foot Peake self-righting (P&S)	(Note: 33 ft 0 in (10.06 m) x 8 ft 6 in (2.59 m) (10-oared) Peake-class self-righting (P&S) lifeboat, gift of Mr J. Ryder, via the Manchester branch of the RNLI, built by Forrestt of Limehouse, London, costing £297.); Gifted to Ramsey on retirement, for display at Mooragh lake.
222	Mary Isabella	1888	1888–1889	37-foot self-righting (P&S)	(Note: 37 ft 0 in (11.28 m) x 8 ft 0 in (2.44 m) (12-oared) self-righting (P&S) lifeboat, gift of Mr and Mrs Norbury of Port Lewaigue, IOM, via the Manchester branch of the RNLI, built by Hansen of Cowes, costing £421.); Returned to manufacturer in 1889 for modifications.
Pre-513	Two Sisters	1868	1889–1890	33-foot Peake self-righting (P&S)	Temporarily returned to service
222	Mary Isabella	1888	1891–1896	37-foot self-righting (P&S)	Damaged in service, and broken up in 1896.
391	Mary Isabella	1896	1896–1915	37-foot self-righting (P&S)	(Note: 37 ft 0 in (11.28 m) x 9 ft 3 in (2.82 m) (10-oared) self-righting (P&S) lifeboat, gift of Mr and Mrs Norbury of Port Lewaigue, IOM, via the Manchester branch of the RNLI, built by Hansen of Cowes, costing £551.); Sold in 1916.
402	Anna Maria Lee	1897	1915–1927	37-foot self-righting (P&S)	(Note: 37 ft 0 in (11.28 m) x 9 ft 3 in (2.82 m) (10-oared) self-righting (P&S) lifeboat, funded from the legacy of Mrs S. A. Lee of Gunnersbury, built by Rutherford of Birkenhead, costing £567 when new.); Previously at Fraserburgh. Sold in 1927.
512	Matthew Simpson	1903	1927–1931	37-foot self-righting (P&S)	(Note: 37 ft 0 in (11.28 m) x 9 ft 3 in (2.82 m) (10-oared) self-righting (P&S) lifeboat, gift of the Misses Simpson of Lancaster, built by Thames Ironworks of Blackwall, London, costing £928 when new.); Previously at Berwick-upon-Tweed. Transferred to Llandudno.

Pre ON numbers are unofficial numbers used by the Lifeboat Enthusiasts' Society to reference early lifeboats not included on the official RNLI list.

=== Motor lifeboats ===
ON	Op.No. (Note: Op. No. is the RNLI's Operational Number of the boat carried on the hull.)	Name	Built	On station	Class	Comments
745	–	Lady Harrison	1931	1931–1948	35-foot 6in self-righting (motor)	Transferred to Aberystwyth
862	–	Thomas Corbett	1948	1948–1970	Liverpool	Transferred to Hoylake
995	37-24	James Ball Richie	1970	1970–1991	Oakley	
1171	12-14	Ann and James Richie	1991	1991–2019	Mersey	
1181	12-22	Ruby Clery	1992	2019–2022	Mersey	Previously at Peel
1349	13-42	Ann and James Richie II	2021	2022–	Shannon	

More post-service details can be found on the respective lifeboat class pages.

=== Launch and recovery tractors ===
Op.No.	Reg.No.	Type	On station	Comments
T4	XA 9192	Clayton	1931–1933	
T18	PY 7589	Clayton	1933–1938	
T30	DMN 850	Case L	1938–1955	
T41	JXR 66	Case LA	1955–1963	
T45	9065 MN	Case LA	1963–1970	
T76	119 TMN	Case 1000D	1970–1980	
T80	H359 MAN	Case 1000D	1980–1983	
T78	MAN 2241	Case 1000D	1983–1990	
T110	G751 MNT	Talus MB-H Crawler	1990–2002	
T105	FMN 664V	Talus MB-H Crawler	2002–2015	
T101	MMN 258H	Talus MB-H Crawler	2015–2021	
T108	1222 MN	Talus MB-H Crawler	2021–2022	
SC-T26	GMN 1342	SLARS (Clayton)	2022–	

== See also ==
- List of RNLI stations
- List of former RNLI stations
- Royal National Lifeboat Institution lifeboats
