= Talus Atlantic 85 DO-DO launch carriage =

RNLI lifeboat launch trailer

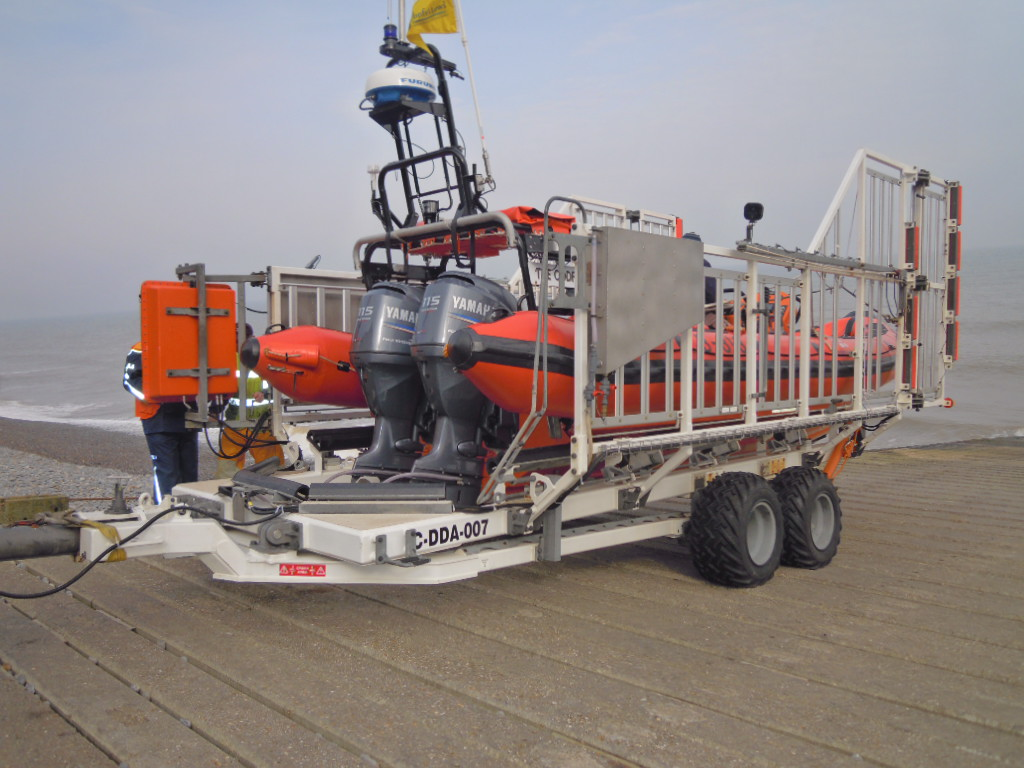
- Talus Atlantic 85 DO-DO launch carriage
- Type: Launch carriage
- Manufacturer: Clayton Engineering Limited
- Length: 8.3 m (330 in)
- Weight: 2.4 Tonnes maximum ballasted weight.

The Talus Atlantic 85 DO-DO launch carriage is a drive on - drive off lifeboat launch and recovery carriage used by both the RNLI and Independent services, to launch their Atlantic-class Inshore lifeboats.

== Design ==
The design is by Clayton Engineering Limited, who worked with the RNLI to produce the launch system. The carriage works in conjunction with Talus tractors which are used to deploy the Atlantic 85 inshore lifeboats. There are three versions of the carriage which includes a standard carriage and the option of a hydraulic power pack so that the angle of the launch can be changed to suit the conditions. The carriage launch platform has a main bed which elevates through 10° to achieve this feature. The third variant of the carriage has the elevation bed mounted on a rail carriage system.

== Operation ==
Under normal launch conditions the lifeboat is loaded with its bow to the rear of the carriage to allow faster deployment. When the lifeboat is recovered it reverses back on to the launch bed. Depending on the sea condition the helmsman require good seamanship to achieve this.

All of the following fleet details are referenced to the 2008–2026 Lifeboat Enthusiast Society Handbooks, with information retrieved directly from RNLI records.

== Carriage fleet ==
Op.No. (Note: Op.No. is the RNLI's operational number of the carriage.)	In service	Station	Image	Current Payload	Comments
C-DD-001	2007–	Mudeford		Atlantic 85; Henrietta H (B-948)	
C-DD-002	2007–	Cullercoats		Atlantic 85; Daddy's Girl (B-935)	
C-DD-003	2007–	Newquay		Atlantic 85; Uncle Johnny (B-936)	
C-DD-004	2007–2025	Flamborough			
C-DDR-005-P (Hydraulic Cradle)	2007–	Port Erin		Atlantic 85; Neil Crowe (B-951)	
C-DDR-006-S (Hydraulic Cradle)	2007–	Kirkcudbright		Atlantic 85; George D Dow (B-952)	
C-DDA-007	2007–2025	Sheringham		Atlantic 85; Sheila Stenhouse (B-814)	
C-DDA-007	2026–	Hastings		Atlantic 85; Sheila Stenhouse (B-814)	
C-DDA-008-PT	2007–2019	Walmer		Atlantic 85; Florence and Ernest Bowles (B-937)	
C-DDA-008-PT	2019–	Aberystwyth		Atlantic 85; Florence and Ernest Bowles (B-937)	
C-DDA-009-S	2007–2019	Aberystwyth		Atlantic 85; Hello Herbie II (B-900)	
C-DDA-009-S	2019–	Rye Harbour		Atlantic 85; Hello Herbie II (B-900)	
C-DDA-010	2007–2011	Criccieth			
C-DDA-011-P	2007–2015	Minehead		Atlantic 85; Hounslow Branch (B-950)	
C-DDA-011-P	2019–	Walmer		Atlantic 85; Hounslow Branch (B-950)	
C-DDA-012-P	2012–2021	St Bees		Atlantic 85; William and Eleanor (B-867)	
C-DDA-012-P	2021–	Blackpool		Atlantic 85; William and Eleanor (B-867)	
C-DDA-013	2008–2016	Lough Swilly		Atlantic 85; Elaine and Don Wilkinson (B-828)	
C-DDA-013	2016–	Silloth		Atlantic 85; Elaine and Don Wilkinson (B-828)	
C-DD-014	2018–	Hayling Island		Atlantic 85; Clark (B-964)	
C-DD-015	2008–2016	Silloth		Atlantic 85; Colonel Stock (B-930)	
C-DD-015	2021–	Margate		Atlantic 85; Colonel Stock (B-930)	
C-DD-016	2009–2018	Hayling Island		Atlantic 85; William Henry Liddington (B-834)	
C-DD-016	2019–	Bundoran		Atlantic 85; William Henry Liddington (B-834)	
C-DD-017	2009–2010	St Bees		Atlantic 85; Geoffrey Charles (B-843)	
C-DD-017	2010–2021	Kilrush		Atlantic 85; Geoffrey Charles (B-843)	
C-DD-017	2021–	Red Bay		Atlantic 85; Geoffrey Charles (B-843)	
C-DD-018-P	2009–2022	Porthcawl			
C-DD-019	2009–2019	Bundoran		Atlantic 85; Tommy Niven (B-836)	
C-DD-019	2019–	Kinghorn		Atlantic 85; Tommy Niven (B-836)	
C-DD-020	2009–2018	Kinghorn		Atlantic 85; Maureen Lilian (B-839)	
C-DD-020	2019–	Penarth		Atlantic 85; Maureen Lilian (B-839)	
C-DDA-021P	2009–2019	New Brighton		Atlantic 85; Joy Morris MBE	
C-DDA-021P	2020–2021	Criccieth		Atlantic 85; Joy Morris MBE	
C-DDA-021P	2021–	St Bees		Atlantic 85; Joy Morris MBE	
C-DDA-022-P	2011–2020	Criccieth			
C-DD-023	2010–2019	Beaumaris		Atlantic 85; Hereford Endeavour (B-847)	
C-DD-023	2021–	Trearddur Bay		Atlantic 85; Hereford Endeavour (B-847)	
C-DD-024	2010–2019	Penarth		Atlantic 85; Annette Mary Liddington (B-838)	
C-DD-024	2019–	Beaumaris		Atlantic 85; Annette Mary Liddington (B-838)	
C-DDA-025	2013–2021	Blackpool		Atlantic 85; Frank Townley (B-938)	
C-DDA-025	2021–	Criccieth		Atlantic 85; Frank Townley (B-938)	
C-DD-026	2010–2022	St Catherine		Atlantic 85; Spirit of West Norfolk (B-848)	
C-DD-026	2022–	Hunstanton		Atlantic 85; Spirit of West Norfolk (B-848)	
C-DD-027	2010–2021	Red Bay		Atlantic 85; Leicester Challenge III (B-858)	
C-DD-027	2022–	Redcar		Atlantic 85; Leicester Challenge III (B-858)	
C-DDA-028-P	2010–2019	Rye Harbour		Atlantic 85; Charles Dibdin (Civil Service No. 51) (B-837)	
C-DDA-028-P	2019–	New Brighton		Atlantic 85; Charles Dibdin (Civil Service No. 51) (B-837)	
C-DD-029	2016–2023	Lough Swilly		Atlantic 85; James and Helen Mason (B-862)	
C-DD-029	2023–	Tighnabruaich		Atlantic 85; James and Helen Mason (B-862)	
C-DD-030	2010–2021	Trearddur Bay		Atlantic 85; Edith Louise Eastwick (B-844)	
C-DD-030	2021–	Kilrush		Atlantic 85; Edith Louise Eastwick (B-844)	
C-DD-031	2011–2021	Hunstanton		Atlantic 85; Spirit of Loch Fyne (B-857)	
C-DD-031	2023–	Lyme Regis		Atlantic 85; Spirit of Loch Fyne (B-857)	
C-DD-032	2011–2023	Largs		Atlantic 85; Davdot (B-958)	
C-DD-032	2023–	Lough Swilly		Atlantic 85; Davdot (B-958)	
C-DD-033	2012–2023	Lyme Regis		Atlantic 85; Glaneley (B-861)	
C-DD-033	2023–	Appledore		Atlantic 85; Glaneley (B-861)	
C-DD-034	2012–2022	Redcar		Atlantic 85; R. A. Wilson (B-854)	
C-DD-034	2023–	Largs		Atlantic 85; R. A. Wilson (B-854)	
C-DD-035	2012–2023	Appledore			
C-DD-035	2024–2025	Clacton-on-Sea			
C-DD-036	2012–2023	Tighnabruaich			
C-DD-037	2012–2024	Clacton-on-Sea		Atlantic 85; Richard Wake Burdon (B-864)	
C-DD-037	2024–	Newbiggin		Atlantic 85; Richard Wake Burdon (B-864)	
C-DDA-038	2012–2024	Newbiggin			
C-DD-039	2021–2023	Littlestone-on-Sea		Atlantic 85; Patrick and Dianne O'Connor (B-957)	
C-DD-039	2026–	Ilfracombe		Atlantic 85; Patrick and Dianne O'Connor (B-957)	
C-DD-040	2013–	Skerries		Atlantic 85; Louis Simson (B-866)	
C-DD-041	2013–2024	Clifden		Atlantic 85; Forever Yibba (B-959)	
C-DD-041	2025–	Flamborough		Atlantic 85; Forever Yibba (B-959)	
C-DD-042	2013–	Cardigan		Atlantic 85; Albatross (B-871)	
C-DD-043	2014–2024	Kessock		Atlantic 85; Berylium (B-955)	
C-DD-043	2025–	Newcastle		Atlantic 85; Berylium (B-955)	
C-DD-044-P	2013–	Baltimore		Atlantic 85; Rita Daphne Smyth (B-910)	
C-DD-045	2014–	Clovelly		Atlantic 85; Toby Rundle (B-872)	
C-DD-046	2014–	Arran		Atlantic 85; Rachael Hedderwick (B-876)	
C-DD-047	2014–	Whitstable		Atlantic 85; Lewisco (B-877)	
C-DDA-048-S	2015–	Minehead		Atlantic 85; Penny J II (B-939)	
C-DD-049	2015–	Portishead		Atlantic 85; My Lady Anne (B-884)	
C-DD-050	2015–	Abersoch		Atlantic 85; Peter and Ann Setten (B-886)	
C-DD-051	2015–	Mablethorpe		Atlantic 85; Jacqueline Saville (B-887)	
C-DD-052	2016–	Youghal		Atlantic 85; Gordon and Phil (B-890)	
C-DD-053	2016–	Looe		Atlantic 85; Sheila & Dennis Tongue II (B-894)	
C-DD-054	2016–	Aberdovey		Atlantic 85; Hugh Miles (B-896)	
C-DD-055	2016–	Staithes and Runswick		Atlantic 85; Sheila & Dennis Tongue III (B-897)	
C-DD-056	2021–	Filey		Atlantic 85; Marjorie Shepherd (B-928)	
C-DDA-057-P	2017–2023	Happisburgh		Atlantic 85; Ralph (B-949)	
C-DDA-057-P	2024–	Aldeburgh		Atlantic 85; Ralph (B-949)	
C-DD-058	2019–	Burnham-on-Sea		Atlantic 85; Doris Day and Brian (B-914)	
C-DDA-059	2019–	Burry Port		Atlantic 85; The Missus Barrie (B-915)	
C-DDA-060	2022–	Porthcawl		Atlantic 85; Rose Of The Shires (B-832)	
C-DD-061	2022–	St Catherine		Atlantic 85; Eric W Wilson (B-841)	
C-DD-062	2021–	Weston-super-Mare		Atlantic 85; Douglas Murray (B-830)	
C-DD-063	2024–	Clifden		Atlantic 85; Joyce King (B-869)	
C-DD-064	2023–	Littlestone-on-Sea		Atlantic 85; Jean McIvor (B-922)	
C-DD-065					
C-DD-066					
C-DD-067	2025–	Cleethorpes		Atlantic 85; Loving You (B-942)	
C-DD-068	2025–	Freshwater (Ind.)		Atlantic 85; The Jillian Scott: Spirit of the West Wight V	

== See also ==
- List of RNLI stations
- List of former RNLI stations
- Independent lifeboats in Britain and Ireland
- Talus MB-H amphibious tractor
- Talus MB-764 amphibious tractor
- Talus MB-4H amphibious tractor
- RNLI New Holland TC45 launch tractor
