= St Bees Lifeboat Station =

RNLI Lifeboat station in Cumbria, England

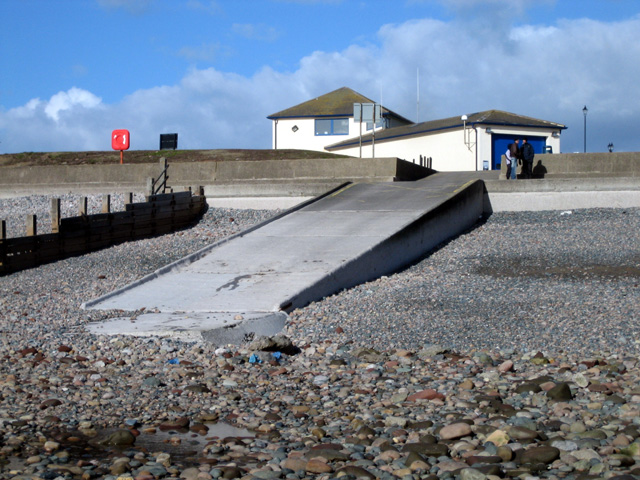
- St Bees Lifeboat Station

- Location within Cumbria

General information
- Type: RNLI Lifeboat Station
- Location: The Promenade, St Bees, Cumbria, CA14 2JH, England
- Coordinates: 54°29′27.3″N 3°36′23.5″W
- Opened: September 1970
- Owner: Royal National Lifeboat Institution

Website
- St Bees RNLI Lifeboat Station

St Bees Lifeboat Station is located at the promenade, in the village of St Bees, approximately 3 miles (4.8 km) south of St Bees Head, the most westerly point on the coast of Cumbria.

An Inshore lifeboat was first stationed in St Bees by the Royal National Lifeboat Institution (RNLI) in September 1970.

The station currently operates a B-class (Atlantic 85) Inshore lifeboat, Joy Morris MBE (B-831), on station since 2009.

== History ==
In 1964, in response to an increasing amount of water-based leisure activity, the RNLI placed 25 small fast Inshore lifeboats around the country. These were easily launched with just a few people, ideal to respond quickly to local emergencies.

More stations were opened, and in May 1970, a lifeboat station was established at St Bees, with the arrival of a D-class (RFD PB16) Inshore lifeboat, the unnamed (D-180).

In 1980, a new 26-foot concrete boathouse (garage) was constructed to house the boat. In 1985, the lifeboat was upgraded to the C-class, a larger faster twin-engined version of the D-class boat. This required an extension to the recently built boathouse.

The C-class lifeboat was launched at 07:25 on 31 July 1993 with four crew, to the aid of the fishing vessel Coeur de Lion, aground on the rocks at Fleshwick Bay. Nearing the vessel, the lifeboat was picked up by a large wave, and washed onto the rocks, damaging the engines. With no power, Helm Alistair Graham beached the lifeboat for repairs, the four men struggling to manhandle the boat ashore, with Graham injured in the process. With repairs being effected, Ian McDowell waded out in the surf, the tell the survivors to wait for the lifeboat. Then leaving Paul McDowell ashore with Graham, Ian McDowell and the other crew member, Marcus Clarkson, set out again, and after two difficult approaches, rescued the two men aboard the Coeur de Lion, which broke up soon afterwards. Again the propellers had been damaged in the rescue, and with little power, the boat headed home, leaving the other two crew members to be picked up by helicopter. Without the lifeboat, it is said that the two men aboard the Coeur de Lion would have perished. Helm Ian McDowell was awarded the RNLI Bronze Medal, with the three other crew members accorded 'The Thanks of the Institution inscribed on Vellum'.

A B-class Atlantic-class lifeboat was assigned to St Bees in 1995. Developed at Atlantic College in partnership with the RNLI, the Atlantic 21-class was the first generation of rigid inflatable boat (RIB) to be placed in service. Another new boathouse was required to accommodate the much larger boat, along with its carriage and Talus MB-764 County launch tractor. The new boathouse was constructed on three levels, and provided a workshop, storage, a retail outlet, and much improved crew facilities. The boathouse, costing £300,000, was opened by H.R.H. The Duchess of Kent on 10 October 1995.

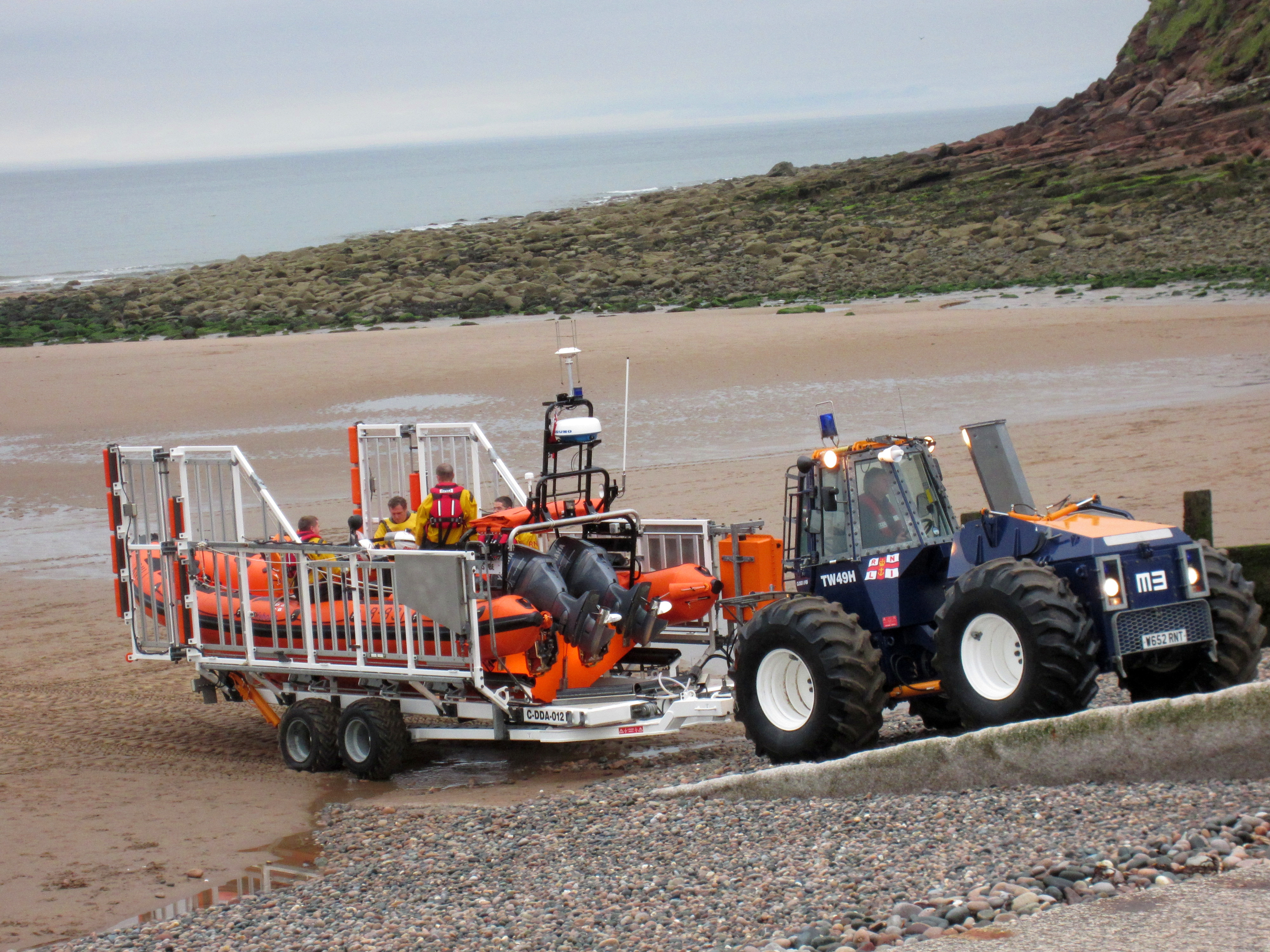
Atlantic 85-class Joy Morris MBE (B-831) and MB-4H Amphibious Launch Tractor (TW49)

Two Atlantic 21-class lifeboats were assigned to St Bees over the summer of 1995, the first on 28 April 1995, replacing the C-class lifeboat (C-515). On 14 December 1995, the Atlantic 21 was withdrawn, and St Bees would receive their permanent B-class lifeboat, a new Atlantic 75-class.

Percy Henry Patmore MBE MM was a decorated World War I veteran, awarded the Military Medal. Having survived the first world war, and also awarded an MBE between the wars, he was a civilian victim of World War II. On 18 May 1996, the new B-class (Atlantic 75) at St Bees was named Percy Henry Patmore MBE MM in his honour, funded from the legacy of his widow, Florence. In its 14-year service, it would launch 158 times, and rescue 125 people.

St Bees would receive the new improved B-class (Atlantic 85) in 2009. Funded by North Regional Appeal and the legacies of Mrs Violet Cissie Mayberry and Mrs Joan Margaret Boorman, Joy Morris MBE (B-831) was placed on service on 7 April 2009.

In October 2024, tributes were paid to one of the founding members of the St Bees lifeboat, Robert 'Bob' McLaughlin, of Whitehaven, Cumbria, who died aged 89. McLaughlin had previously served as Senior Helm on the St Bees Inshore lifeboat, and was awarded the British Empire Medal in the 1990 Birthday Honours. He became operations manager at Workington Lifeboat Station in 1995, later becoming life president of the Whitehaven branch of the RNLI. In 2022, he celebrated 60 years with the Institution.

== Station honours ==
The following are awards made at St Bees:

- RNLI Bronze Medal
  Ian McDowell, Senior Helm – 1993
- The Thanks of the Institution inscribed on Vellum
  Alastair Graham, Helm – 1993
  Marcus Clarkson, crew member – 1993
  Paul McDowell, crew member – 1993
- A Framed Letter of Thanks signed by the Chairman of the Institution
  Ian McDowell, crew member – 1982
  Malcolm Reid, crew member – 1982
- Chief Constable's Commendation, awarded by The Chief Constable of the Cumbria Constabulary
  Ian McDowell – 2004
  Paul McDowell – 2004
  Dave Barker – 2004
  Dick Beddows – 2004
- British Empire Medal
  Robert McLaughlin – 1990QBH

== St Bees lifeboats ==
=== Inshore lifeboats ===
Op.No. (Note: Op. No. is the RNLI's Operational Number of the boat or vehicle carried on the hull.)	Name	On station	Class	Comments
D-180	Unnamed	1970–1985	D-class (RFD PB16)	
C-515	Unnamed	1985–1995	C-class (Zodiac Grand Raid IV)	
B-544	Catherine Plumbley	1995	B-class (Atlantic 21)	
B-555	Long Life I	1995	B-class (Atlantic 21)	
B-719	Percy Henry Patmore MBE MM	1995–2009	B-class (Atlantic 75)	
B-831	Joy Morris MBE	2009–	B-class (Atlantic 85)	

=== Launch and recovery tractors ===
Op. No.	Reg. No.	Type	On station	Comments
TW07	XLJ 796S	Talus MB-764 County	1989–1996	
TW01	XTK 150M	Talus MB-764 County	1996–2000	
TW50	W419 UUJ	Talus MB-4H Hydrostatic (Mk1.5)	2000–2010	
TW49	W652 RNT	Talus MB-4H Hydrostatic (Mk1.5)	2010–	

== See also ==
- List of RNLI stations
- List of former RNLI stations
- Royal National Lifeboat Institution lifeboats
- Talus Atlantic 85 DO-DO launch carriage
