= Newquay Lifeboat Station =

RNLI lifeboat station in Cornwall, England

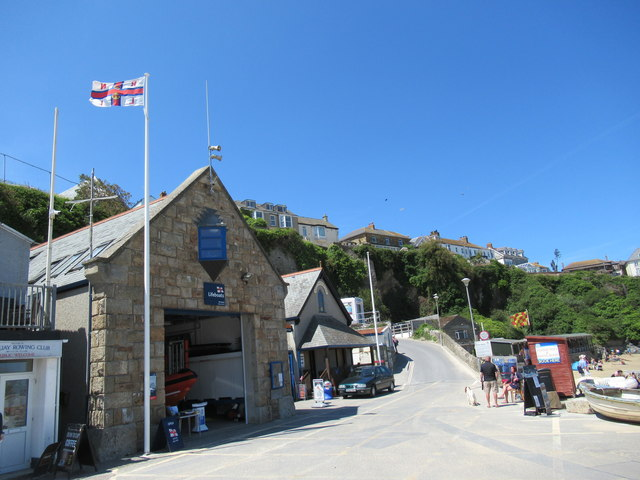
- Newquay Lifeboat Station in 2019

- Location within Cornwall

General information
- Type: Lifeboat station
- Location: Newquay Harbour, South Quay Hill, Newquay, Cornwall, TR7 1HR, United Kingdom
- Coordinates: 50°24′59″N 05°05′14″W
- Opened: 1860–1934; 1940–1945; 1965–present (ILB)
- Owner: Royal National Lifeboat Institution

Website
- Newquay RNLI Lifeboat Station

Listed Building – Grade II
- Feature: Old lifeboat house and slipway (Towan Head)
- Designated: 11 May 1988
- Reference no.: 1312227

Newquay Lifeboat Station sits at the head of the harbour, off South Quay Hill in Newquay, a seaside resort on the north-west coast of Cornwall, England.

A lifeboat station was first established at Newquay by the Royal National Lifeboat Institution (RNLI) in 1860.

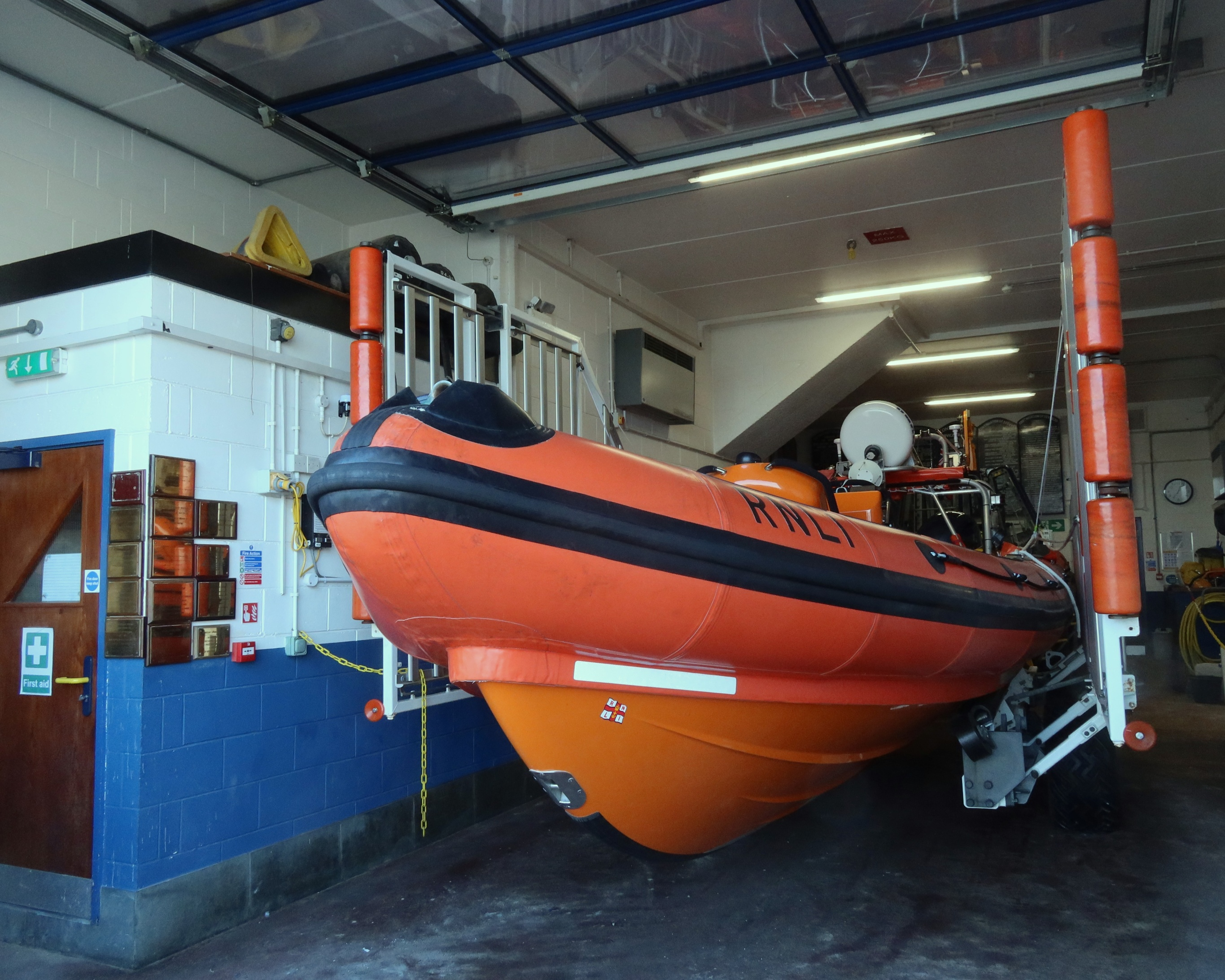
B-class (Atlantic 85) Inshore lifeboat Uncle Johnny (B-936) in 2025.

The station currently operates a B-class (Atlantic 85) Inshore lifeboat, Uncle Johnny (B-936), on station since 2023, and the smaller D-class (IB1) Inshore lifeboat, Richmond (D-907), on station since 2025.

== History ==
Ever since its founding in 1824, the Royal National Institution for the Preservation of Life from Shipwreck (RNIPLS), later to become the RNLI in 1854, would award medals for deeds of gallantry at sea, even if no lifeboats were involved.

The RNIPLS Silver Medal was awarded to Capt. Thomas Tegg, Master of the sloop Caroline, for the rescue of the crew of the schooner Comet on 26 February 1852. Seaman Charles Pearce received the RNLI Silver Medal after helping save the crew of the schooner New Jane of Exeter on 20 December 1854, and coastguard William Henry Tregidgo received his third silver award, in charge of a team that saved 11 men from the schooner Union and the lugger Anais, both wrecked on 26 October 1859. Tredigo had been awarded the silver medal twice previously, for service at Boscastle and Bude.

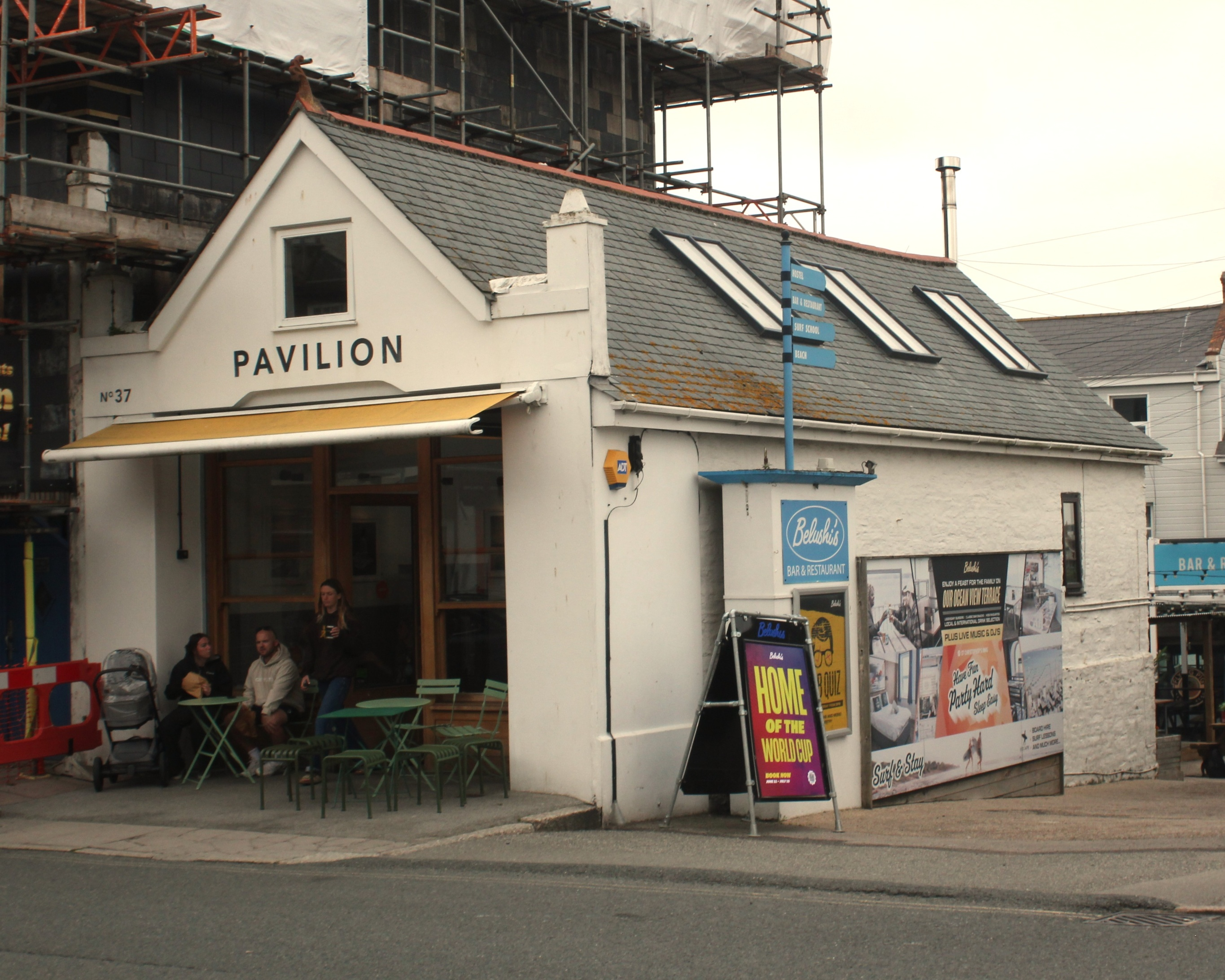
1860 boathouse on Fore street (2026)

At a meeting of the RNLI committee of management on Thursday 2 February 1860, it was reported that an anonymous lady of Durham wished to present the cost of lifeboats and equipment, to establish stations at St Ives, Tyrella, Buckie and Newquay. It was decided to set up stations at each location if practicable.

In September 1860, a 30 ft (9.1 m) Peake-class self-righting 'Pulling and Sailing' (P&S) lifeboat, one with sails and (six) oars, built by Forrestt of Limehouse, London, and costing £157, was transported with its carriage to Truro, conveyed free of charge by the Great Western and other railway companies. From there it was taken to Newquay, where it was named Joshua. A boathouse was constructed on Fore street, at a cost of £133.

Joshua saw barely five years of service, launching four times, and saving five lives. The boat was replaced in 1865 with a larger 32 ft (9.8 m) lifeboat with 10 oars. Funded from the gift of the same anonymous lady, it was also named Joshua. The boat capsized on exercise in 1868, but none of the crew were lost. In 1871, funding from Miss A. M. White of Plymouth was appropriated, and the name was changed to James and Elizabeth.

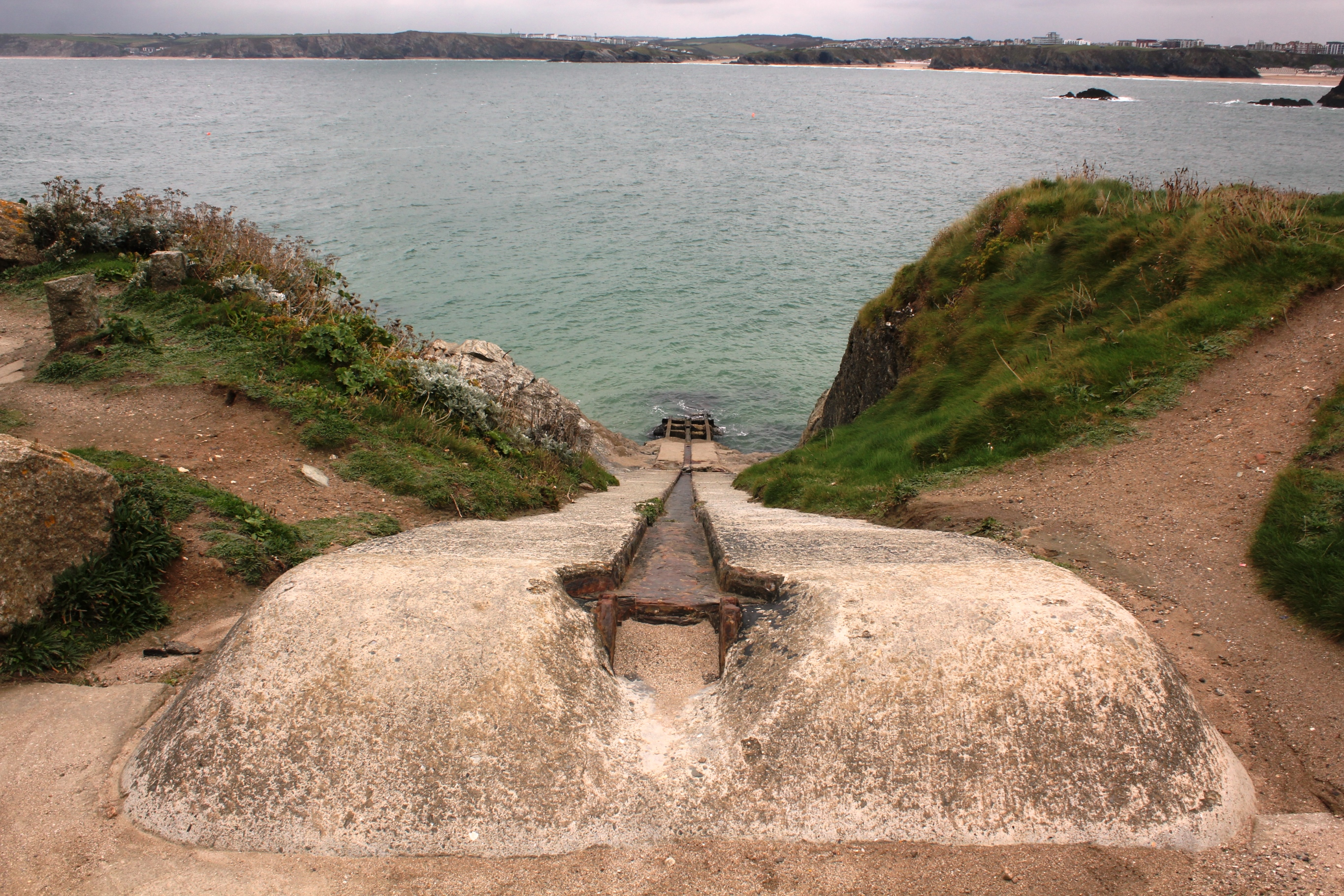
1 in 2.5 (40%) Towan Head Lifeboat Slipway

From the boathouse on Fore street, the lifeboat could be transported on its carriage, and launched from a number of locations. A slipway was built at Towan Head in 1895, a distance of 0.8 miles (1.3 km) from the boathouse. With an inclination of 1 in 2.5 (40%), it was one of the steepest slipways in the country. In 1897, Newquay was considered as a location from which to operate a Steam-class lifeboat, but it was decided that Padstow was more suitable. In 1899, a new station building was completed at Towan Head, at a cost of £700, coinciding with the arrival of a new 35 ft (11 m) lifeboat, James Stevens No. 5 (ON 426). Some modification to the slipway was required for the new boat, costing a further £200.

Returning from exercise on 6 March 1908, the James Stevens No. 5 capsized. All the crew regained the boat, with the exception of 31-year-old Harry Storey. £205 was awarded by the RNLI committee of management to a local fund, in aid of his dependents.

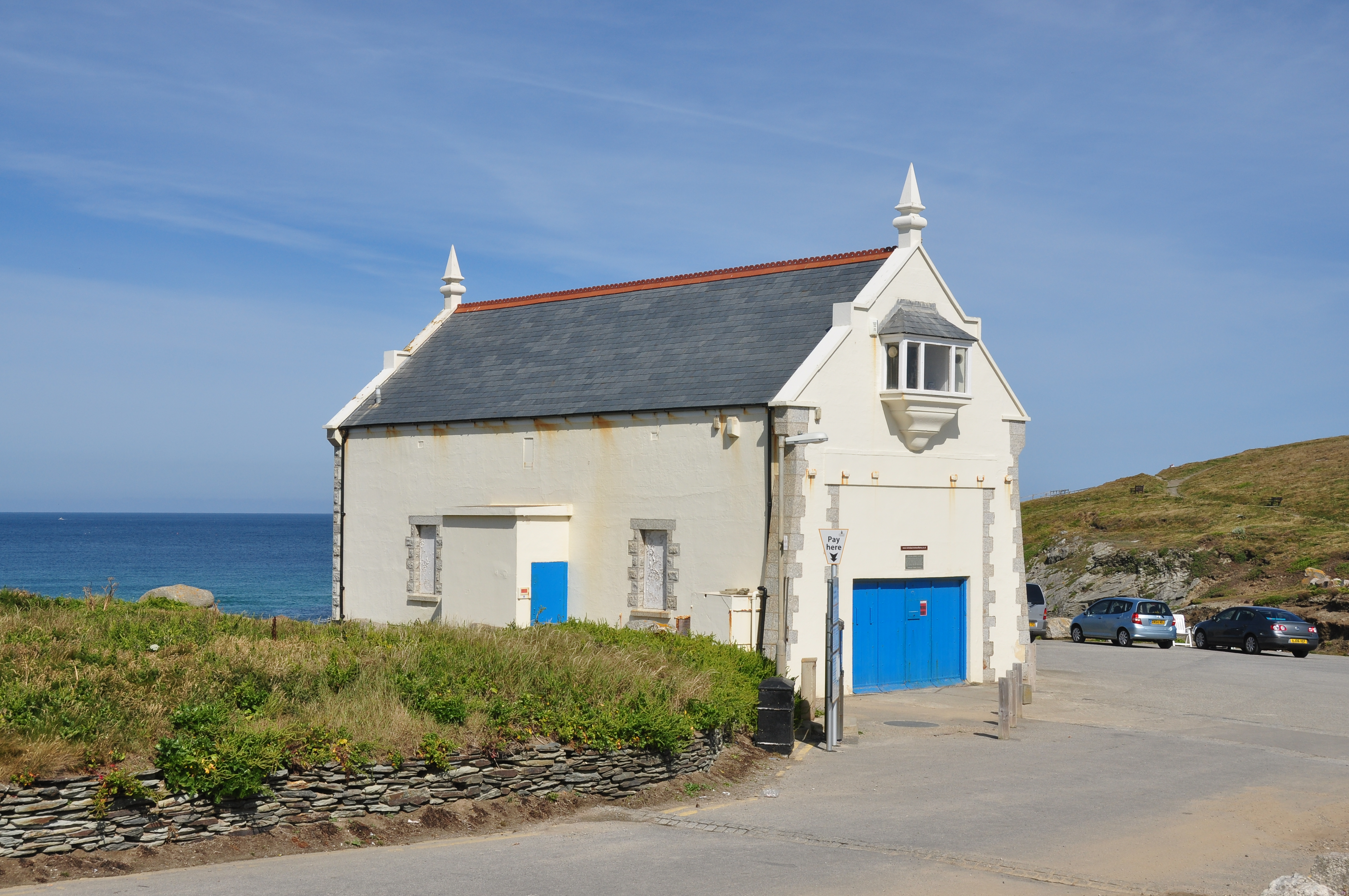
1899 boathouse at Towan Head (2011)

On 17 December 1917, the steamship Osten was dragging her anchor in a north-east gale. Help was requested, but the newly appointed coxswain, Capt. Delbridge, said the conditions were too bad to launch. Former coxswain James Gill offered to command the lifeboat, along with second coxswain Richard Trebilcock. The lifeboat was launched, and almost immediately was thrown on her beam ends, and overpowered by a succession of large waves. The boat was smashed onto the rocks and broke up, but all the crew made it ashore. The steamer was later brought to safety. Despite being proven correct, Delbridge was subsequently relieved of the position of coxswain. James Gill and Richard Trebilcock were awarded the RNLI's silver and bronze medal respectively, with Trebilcock also appointed as the new coxswain.

With motor-powered lifeboats operating from the flanking stations of Padstow and St Ives, effectively rendering the Newquay P&S lifeboat obsolete, it was decided to closed the station in 1934. The lifeboat on station at the time, Admiral Sir George Back (ON 509), was sold from service in 1936.

There was a short reprieve six years later, when a motor lifeboat was placed at Newquay in 1940, remaining there just for the duration of World War II. The Liverpool-class lifeboat, Richard Silver Oliver (ON 794), had previously suffered a capsize in 1939 at Cullercoats, with the loss of five crew and a naval cadet. No such problems were encountered at Newquay, and when the boat was withdrawn in 1945, it had been launched 21 times, and saved 11 lives.

=== 1965 onwards ===
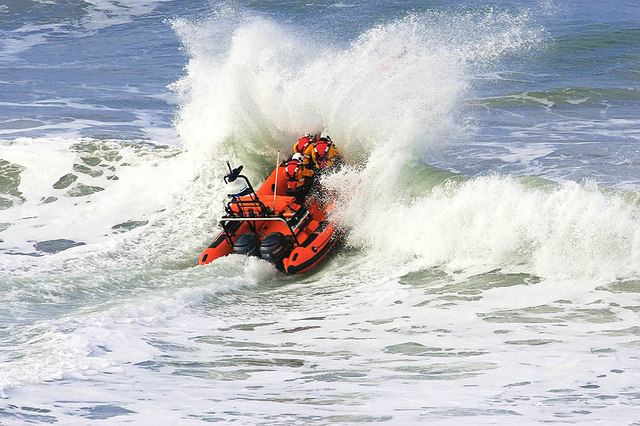
B-class (Atlantic 85) Gladys Mildred (B-821 ) 2007–2023

In 1964, in response to an increasing amount of water-based leisure activity, the RNLI placed 25 small fast Inshore lifeboats around the country. These were easily launched with just a few people, ideal to respond quickly to local emergencies.

More stations were opened, and in June 1965, Newquay lifeboat station was re-established, as an Inshore lifeboat station, with the arrival of a D-class (RFD PB16) Inshore lifeboat (D-55). The station operated a succession of D-class lifeboats, upgrading to a twin-engined version, later designated C-class, in 1983.

Funded by the bequest of Mrs Mary Triniman, the RNLI began to look for a new location at Newquay, with a view to adding the larger B-class lifeboat to the station. The ideal place was at the head of the harbour, exactly where the wooden building of the Seaman's Mission was standing. An agreement was made between the two organisations, and a new Mission building was constructed alongside a new lifeboat station. Plans to try to save and relocate the wooden building failed, as it was not structurally sound, but parts and materials such as floorboards and furnishings were salvaged, to preserve some of the history in the new build. The station was officially opened on 22 October 1994, and is the only RNLI station with a church attached.

The C-class (Zodiac Grand Raid IV) Oats (C-509) Inshore lifeboat was replaced in 1995 by two lifeboats, a D-class (EA16) lifeboat, Phyl Clare (D-406), and the B-class (Atlantic 21) Lions International District 105 SE (B-539), both from the relief fleet, along with a Talus MB-4H amphibious tractor for launching. Each relief lifeboat was in turn replaced with a permanent boat, the B-class (Atlantic 75) Phyllis (B-715) on 13 September 1995, and the D-class (EA16) Lord Daresbury (D-497) on 11 April 1996.

The D-class (IB1) lifeboat Valerie Wilson (D-636) was called at 12:42 on Wednesday 27 January 2010, to reports of two men cut off by the tide at Fern Cove, and clinging to the cliffs. The two men had been out running, and were dressed just in shorts and t-shirts. They had been spotted by two surfers, one who went to assist the men, and the second who raised the alarm. Launching at 12:56, into relatively calm conditions, the lifeboat was on scene within 4 minutes, but once there found the surf 2–3 m (6.6–9.8 ft) in height, peaking at 4–5 m (13–16 ft). Unable to get close in, Morris had decided to request a helicopter rescue, when unexpectedly, the men jumped into the water. All three crew disembarked the lifeboat, pulling the lifeboat towards the cove, one moment standing on rocks, the next being swept off their feet by 2m waves. Aaron Trebilic scrambled into the cove, and physically pushed and carried both casualties, by now extremely fatigued and suffering from hypothermia, out to the lifeboat.

Helm Mark Morris received the Emile Robin award for 2010, awarded by The Shipwrecked Fishermen and Mariners' Royal Benevolent Society, to the commander of a British vessel who has performed the most outstanding sea rescue of the year. Aaron Trebilcock was awarded their Special Commendation. Both men were accorded 'The Thanks of the Institution inscribed on Vellum' by the Institution, with the third crew member Richard Martin receiving 'A Framed Letter of Thanks signed by the Chairman of the Institution'.

In the 2021 Birthday Honours, Gareth Alwyn Horner was awarded the MBE for services to the RNLI. Horner joined Newquay lifeboat station in 1974, and since then has held roles as lifeboat crew, shore crew, launching authority and since 2004, as Lifeboat Operations Manager. In 1997, he was accorded 'The Thanks of the Institution inscribed on Vellum', when as a member of the crew of D-class (EA16) lifeboat Lord Daresbury (D-497), he helped rescue three men cut off by the tide.

== Station honours ==
The following are awards made at Newquay:

- RNIPLS Silver Medal
  Capt. Thomas Tegg, Master of the sloop Caroline – 1853
- RNLI Silver Medal
  Charles Pearce, seaman – 1855
  William Henry Tregidgo, Chief boatman, H.M. Coastguard, Newquay – 1860 (Third-service clasp)
  James Gill, Acting Coxswain – 1918
- RNLI Bronze Medal
  Richard James Trebilcock, Second Coxswain – 1918
- 'The Thanks of the Institution inscribed on Vellum'
  F. L. Nicholas, honorary treasurer – 1934
  Norman Bailey, crew member – 1973
  Jeremy Griffiths, Helm – 1997
  Gareth Horner, crew member – 1997
  Martin Snell, crew member – 1997
  Wayne Martin, Helm – 2000
  Mark Morris, Helm – 2010
  Aaron Trebilcock, crew member – 2010
- The Emile Robin award for 2010,
  awarded by The Shipwrecked Fishermen and Mariners' Royal Benevolent Society,
  to the commander of a British vessel who has performed the most outstanding sea rescue of the year.
  Mark Morris, Helm – 2010
- Special Commendation,
  awarded by The Shipwrecked Fishermen and Mariners' Royal Benevolent Society
  Aaron Trebilcock, crew member – 2010
- 'A Framed Letter of Thanks signed by the Chairman of the Institution'
  D. Snell, Helm – 1984
  W. Martin, crew member – 1984
  C. Pearce, crew member – 1984
  P. Rockall, crew member – 1984
  Kevin Gee, crew member – 1996
  Laurence Pascoe, crew member – 2000
  Jeremy Griffiths, crew member – 2000
  Philip Trebilcock, tractor driver – 2000
  Kevin Gee, Helm – 2005
  Richard Martin, crew member – 2010
- Member, Order of the British Empire (MBE)
  Gareth Alwyn Horner, Lifeboat Operations Manager – 2021QBH. For services to the Royal National Lifeboat Institution.

== Roll of honour ==
In memory of those lost whilst serving Newquay lifeboat:

- Lost when the lifeboat James Stevens No. 5 capsized on exercise, 6 March 1908.
  Henry 'Harry' Storey (31)

== Newquay lifeboats ==
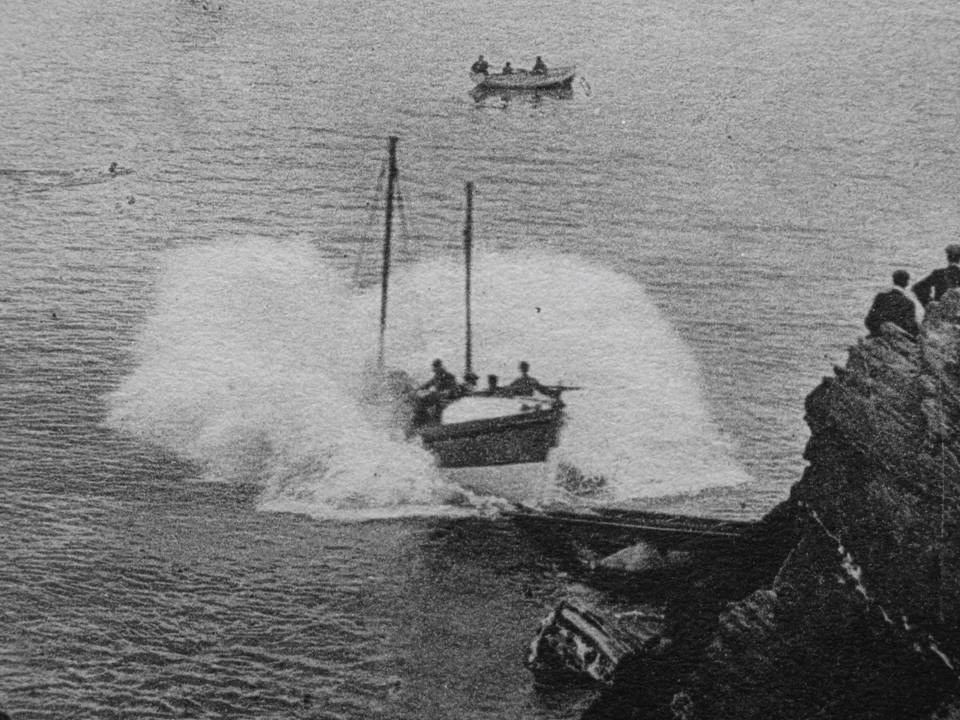
James Stevens No. 5 (ON 426) 1899–1917

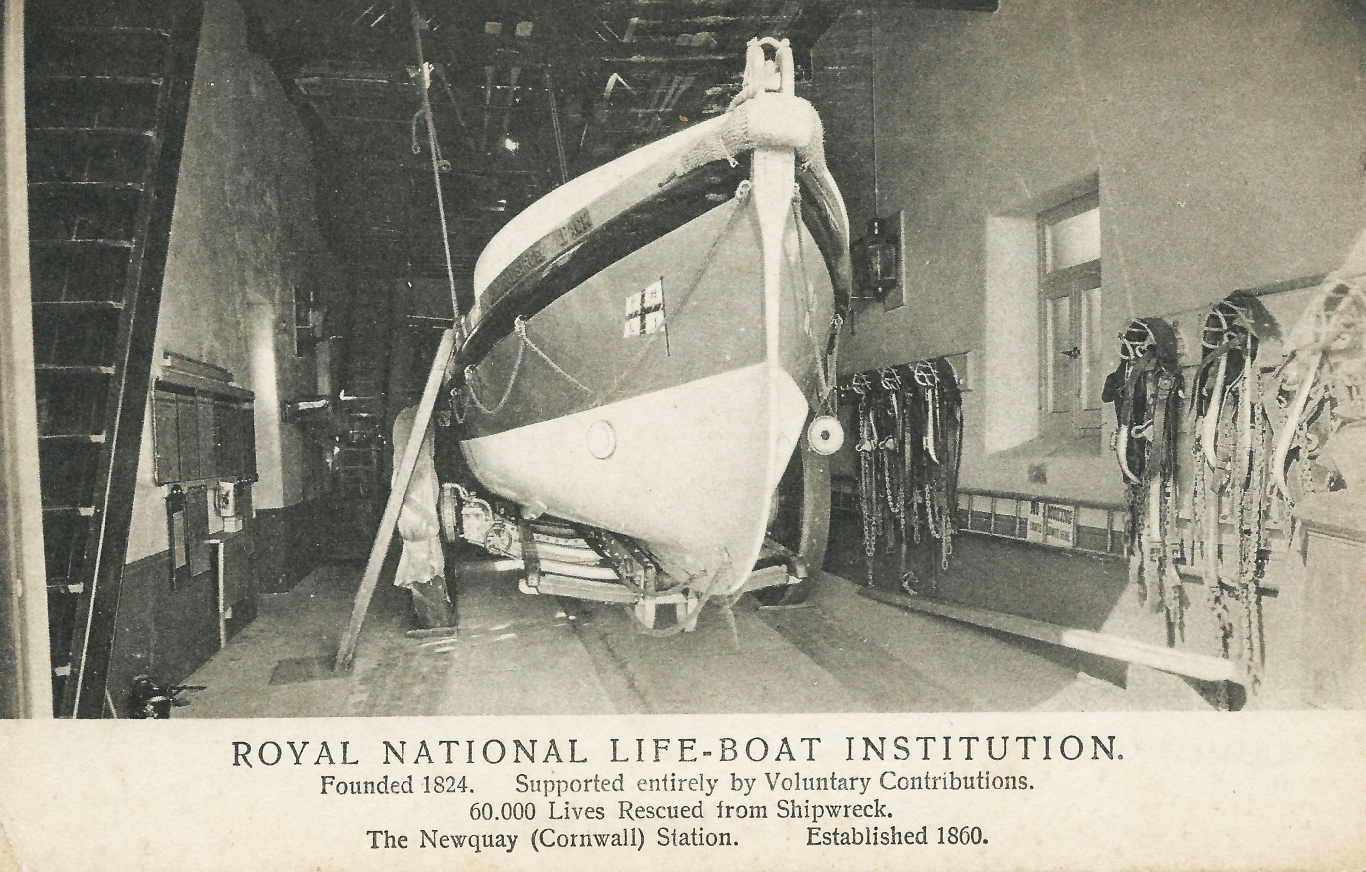
Admiral Sir George Back (ON 509) 1920–1934

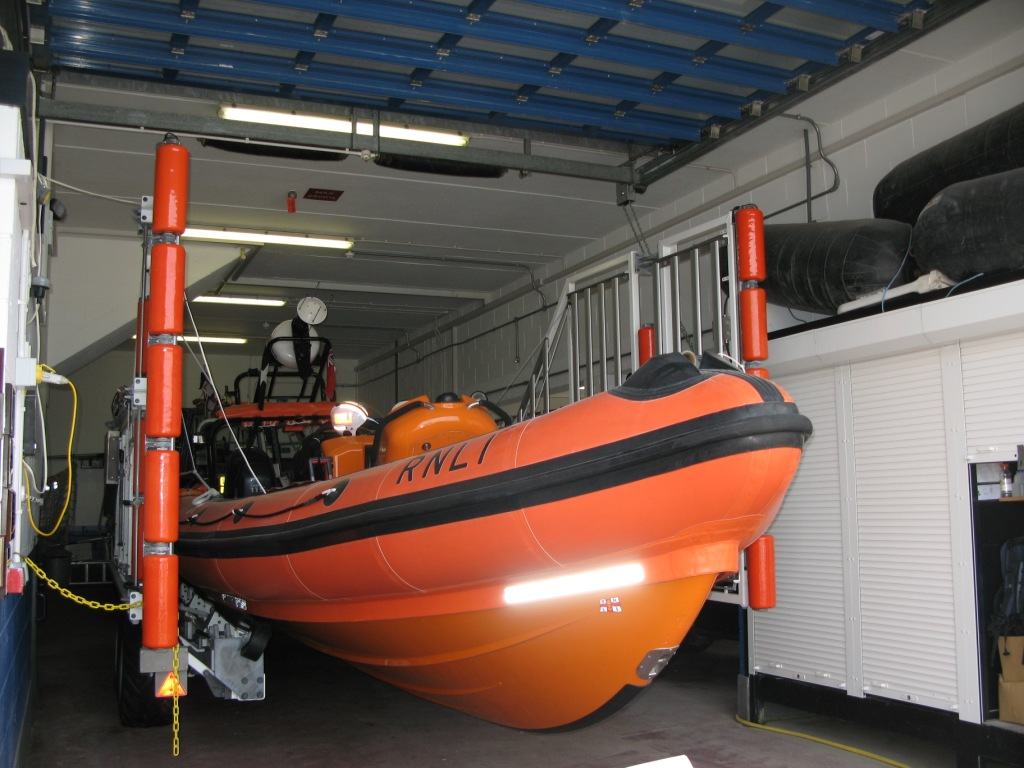
Gladys Mildred (B-821 ) 2007–2023

=== Pulling and Sailing (P&S) lifeboats ===
| On station | ON (Note: ON is the RNLI's Official Number of the boat.) | Name | Built | Class | Comments |
|---|---|---|---|---|---|
| 1860–1865 | Pre-365 | Joshua | 1860 | 30-foot Peake self-righting (P&S) | (Note: 30 ft 0 in (9.14 m) x 7 ft 0 in (2.13 m) (6-oared) Peake-class self-righting (P&S) lifeboat, gift of an anonymous lady of Durham, built by Forrestt of Limehouse, London, costing £157.); Sold in 1865. |
| 1865–1871 | Pre-435 | Joshua | 1865 | 32-foot Prowse self-righting (P&S) | (Note: 32 ft 0 in (9.75 m) x 7 ft 5 in (2.26 m) (10-oared) Prowse-class self-righting (P&S) lifeboat, gift of an anonymous lady of Durham, built by Forrestt of Limehouse, London, costing £210.); Renamed James and Elizabeth in 1871. |
| 1871–1873 | Pre-435 | James and Elizabeth | 1865 | 32-foot Prowse self-righting (P&S) | (Note: Gift of Miss A. M. White of Plymouth.); Transferred to Chichester Harbour. |
| 1873–1892 | 210 | James and Elizabeth | 1865 | 33-foot Peake self-righting (P&S) | (Note: 33 ft 0 in (10.06 m) x 8 ft 1 in (2.46 m) (10-oared) self-righting (P&S) lifeboat, originally the gift of Mr & Mrs W. Ferguson of the London Stock Exchange, later funded by the gift of Miss A. M. White of Plymouth, built by Forrestt of Limehouse, London, costing £275 when new.); Previously Sabrina at Kingsdown. Renamed Pendock Neale in 1875. |
| 1875–1892 | 210 | Pendock Neale | 1865 | 33-foot Peake self-righting (P&S) | (Note: Gift of the late Miss Neale and Mrs Herring.); Broken up in 1892. |
| 1892–1899 | 331 | Willie Rogers | 1892 | 34-foot self-righting (P&S) | (Note: 34 ft 0 in (10.36 m) x 8 ft 0 in (2.44 m) (10-oared) self-righting (P&S) lifeboat, legacy of Dr J. Rodgers of Saltash, built by McAlister of Dumbarton, costing £383.); Transferred to Winchelsea. |
| 1899–1917 | 426 | James Stevens No. 5 | 1899 | 35-foot self-righting (P&S) | (Note: 35 ft 0 in (10.67 m) x 8 ft 6 in (2.59 m) (10-oared) self-righting (P&S) lifeboat, legacy of Mr J. Stevens of Birmingham, built by Roberts of Mevagissey, costing £613.); Wrecked on service, 17 December 1917. The remains were found submerged near the Towan Head slipway in 2004. |
| 1917–1920 | 453 | John William Dudley | 1900 | 35-foot self-righting (P&S) | (Note: 35 ft 0 in (10.67 m) x 8 ft 6 in (2.59 m) (10-oared) self-righting (P&S) lifeboat, legacy of Mr J. W. Dudley of Woodford, built by Thames Ironworks of Blackwall, London, costing £831 when new.); Previously at Winchelsea. Transferred to North Berwick. |
| 1920–1934 | 509 | Admiral Sir George Back | 1903 | 35-foot self-righting (P&S) | (Note: 35 ft 0 in (10.67 m) x 8 ft 6 in (2.59 m) (10-oared) self-righting (P&S) lifeboat, legacy of Mrs E. Back of Midhurst, built by Thames Ironworks of Blackwall, London, costing £780 when new.); Previously at The Lizard. Sold in 1936. Renamed Heron V. Last reported at Sharpness, Gloucestershire in 1972. |

Station closed in 1934
Pre ON numbers are unofficial numbers used by the Lifeboat Enthusiasts' Society to reference early lifeboats not included on the official RNLI list.

=== Motor lifeboat ===
| On station | ON | Name | Built | Class | Comments |
|---|---|---|---|---|---|
| 1940–1945 | 794 | Richard Silver Oliver | 1937 | Liverpool | Previously at Cullercoats. Transferred to Ilfracombe. |

More post-service details can be found on the respective lifeboat class pages.

=== Inshore lifeboats ===
==== C-class and D-class lifeboats ====
| On station | Op.No. (Note: Op.No. is the RNLI's Operational Number of the boat carried on the hull.) | Name | Class | Comments |
|---|---|---|---|---|
| 1965–1967 | D-55 | Unnamed | D-class (RFD PB16) | |
| 1967–1968 | D-110 | Unnamed | D-class (RFD PB16) | |
| 1969–1979 | D-171 | Unnamed | D-class (RFD PB16) | |
| 1979–1980 | D-192 | Unnamed | D-class (RFD PB16) | Stationed at Abersoch from 1971. |
| 1980–1984 | D-278 | Unnamed | D-class (Zodiac III) | |
| 1984–1994 | C-511 | Unnamed | C-class (Zodiac Grand Raid IV) | Initially numbered D-511. |
| 1994–1995 | C-509 | Oats | C-class (Zodiac Grand Raid IV) | Stationed at Aberystwyth from 1983. Initially numbered D-509. |
| 1995–1996 | D-406 | Phyl Clare | D-class (EA16) | First deployed in the relief fleet from 1990. |
| 1996–2005 | D-497 | Lord Daresbury | D-class (EA16) | |
| 2005–2014 | D-636 | Valerie Wilson | D-class (IB1) | |
| 2014–2025 | D-773 | Enid Mary | D-class (IB1) | |
| 2025– | D-907 | Richmond | D-class (IB1) | |

==== B-class lifeboats ====
| On station | Op.No. | Name | Class | Comments |
|---|---|---|---|---|
| 1995 | B-539 | Lions International; District 105 SE | B-class (Atlantic 21) | First stationed at Brighton in 1978. |
| 1995–2007 | B-715 | Phyllis | B-class (Atlantic 75) | |
| 2007 | B-717 | Daisy Aitken | B-class (Atlantic 75) | Frst stationed at Lough Swilly in 1995. |
| 2007–2023 | B-821 | Gladys Mildred | B-class (Atlantic 85) | |
| 2023– | B-936 | Uncle Johnny | B-class (Atlantic 85) | |

== Launch and recovery tractors ==
| On station | Op.No. | Reg.No. | Type | Comments |
|---|---|---|---|---|
| <1993–1995 | TA12 | 668 BCV | Ford | For the C-class |
| 1995–2006 | TW26Hc | M423 OAW | Talus MB-4H Hydrostatic (Mk2) | |
| 2006–2017 | TW25Hc | L807 KNT | Talus MB-4H Hydrostatic (Mk2) | |
| 2011–2013 | TA113 | WA11 ENL | New Holland TC24D | |
| 2013–2015 | TA101 | WA10 FCX | New Holland B2035 | |
| 2015– | TA66 | WK05 EBA | New Holland TC27D | |
| 2017– | TW37Hc | P898 CUX | Talus MB-4H Hydrostatic (Mk2) | |

== See also ==
- List of RNLI stations
- List of former RNLI stations
- Royal National Lifeboat Institution lifeboats
- Talus Atlantic 85 DO-DO launch carriage
