= Clifden Lifeboat Station =

RNLI lifeboat station in County Galway, Ireland

- Clifden lifeboat station in 2026

- Location within Ireland

General information
- Type: RNLI Lifeboat Station
- Location: The Quay, Clifden, County Galway, Ireland
- Coordinates: 53°29′09.2″N 10°01′47.2″W
- Opened: 15 March 1988
- Owner: Royal National Lifeboat Institution

Website
- Clifden RNLI Lifeboat Station

Clifden Lifeboat Station is located on The Quay at Clifden, a town on the northern shore of the Owenglin River, where it runs into Clifden Bay, in the Connemara region of County Galway, on the east coast of Ireland.

A lifeboat station was first established at Clifden on 15 March 1988 by the Royal National Lifeboat Institution (RNLI).

The station currently operates 13-43 St Christopher (ON 1350), a Shannon-class All-weather lifeboat, on station since 2022, and a B-class (Atlantic 85) Inshore lifeboat, Joyce King (B-869), on station since 2013.

== History ==
Ever since its founding in 1824, the Royal National Institution for the Preservation of Life from Shipwreck (RNIPLS), later to become the RNLI in 1854, would award medals for deeds of gallantry at sea, even if no lifeboats were involved.

On 20 March 1847, the brig Halifax, on passage from Peru to Cork, was driven ashore from her anchorage in Ardbear Bay, near Clifden. The H.M. Coastguard chief boatman put out with four other men, and in three trips, rescued the Master and 16 crew. Charles Mills was awarded the RNIPLS Silver Medal.

It would be another 141 years before a lifeboat station was established at Clifden. A C-class (Zodiac Grand Raid IV) was placed on station on 15 March 1988, on a one-year evaluation period. The C-class was a development of the D-class lifeboats introduced in 1963, but fitted with two engines giving a higher top speed. Being towed by the station's Landrover, the boat could be launched from a number of sites. The station was declared permanent in March 1989, but at the time, like many other inshore stations, was initially operational only during the summer months.

Demolition of a residential building on The Quay in 1992 provided a location to construct a station building, capable of housing the small inshore lifeboat and launch vehicle, along with a workshop and crew facilities.

Clifden ILB boathouse at Clifden Bay beach

The station was allocated a larger B-class (Atlantic 21) Inshore lifeboat in 1997, and the relief lifeboat John Batstone (B-575), previously at Peel, was placed on service temporarily on 22 May. The lifeboat was moored afloat until a new purpose built boathouse could be constructed at Clifden Bay beach, located 1 mile (1.6 km) to the west of the Inshore boathouse.

1998 saw many changes at Clifden. With the B-class lifeboat on station, there was no need for the twin-engined C-class (Zodiac Grand Raid IV), which was withdrawn. It was replaced with a smaller D-class (EA16) in May 1998. It was the fourth lifeboat funded by the customers of the Fleece Inn at Holme, Holmfirth, West Yorkshire, others being located at Filey and Montrose, and was named Holme Team IV (D-525). The new boathouse was completed in August, and a new Talus MB-764 County launch and recovery tractor arrived on station.

The new B-class (Atlantic 75) lifeboat Benjamin Dowing Fairbridge (B-751) was placed on service on 12 January 1999.

In 2000, the crew of two, a dog, and the yacht Cicada were saved, a service carried in very strong winds off Fahy Point. On 28 December 2007, four people were saved, and another two rescued, after their currach capsized. On each occasion, Helm Bernard Whelan received "A Framed Letter of Thanks signed by the Chairman of the Institution".

The latest version of the Atlantic-class lifeboat, the B-class (Atlantic 85), replaced Benjamin Dowing Fairbridge at Clifden on 26 June 2013. At a ceremony on Saturday 9 November, and funded from the bequest of Mr John Charles King, in memory of his late wife, the new lifeboat was named Joyce King (B-869).

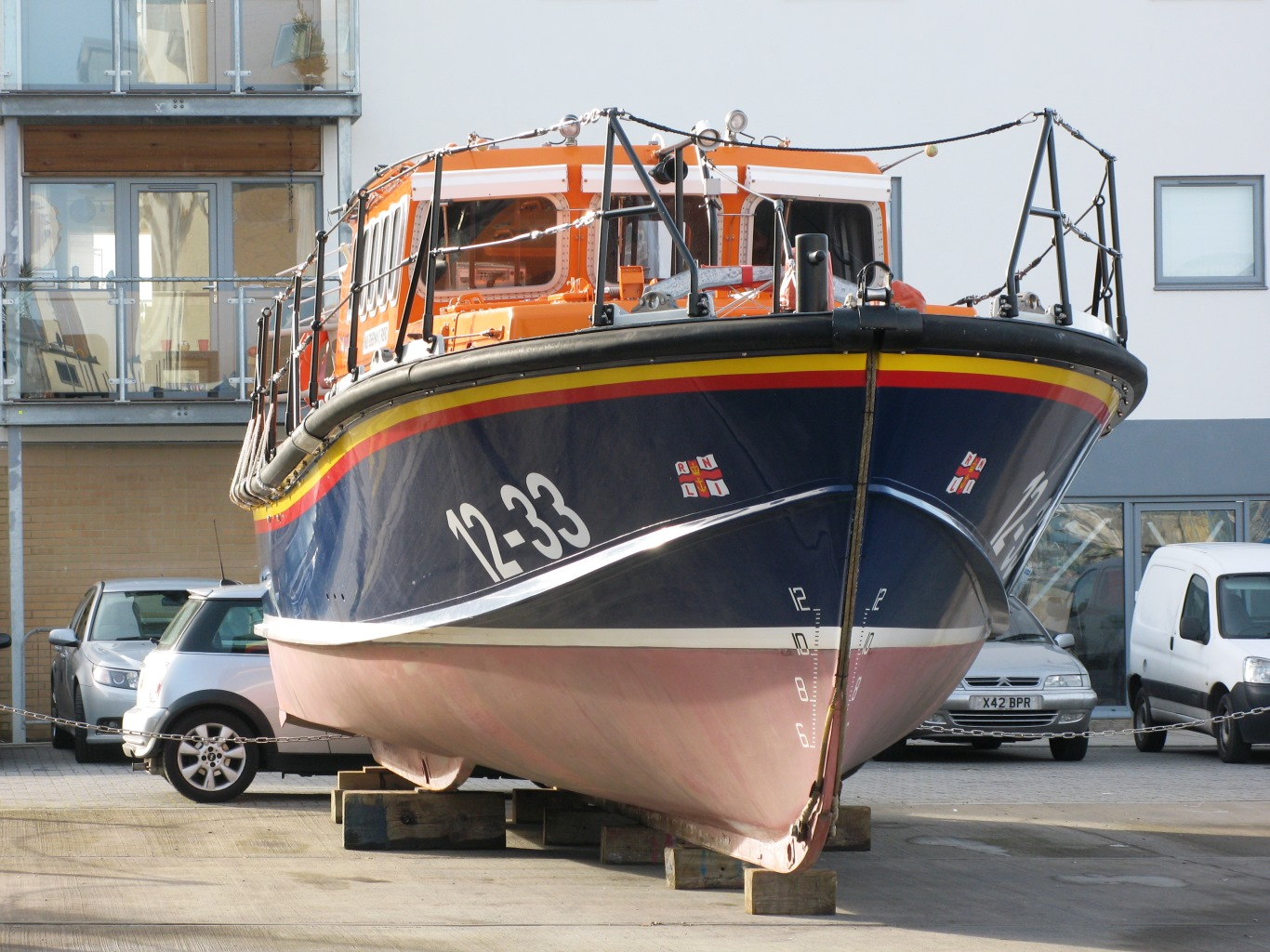
Mersey-class lifeboat 12-33 Fisherman's Friend

Following a coastal review by the RNLI, it was decided to place an All-weather lifeboat at Clifden, initially for a trial and evaluation period of one-year. The 22-year-old Mersey-class All-weather lifeboat 12-27 Pride and Spirit (ON 1186) arrived on station on 6 August 2014.

12-27 Pride and Spirit (ON 1186) was replaced by another temporary Mersey-class lifeboat in 2016, 12-33 Fisherman's Friend (ON 1192). It was announced that an All-weather lifeboat was permanently assigned to Clifden.

The D-class (IB1) lifeboat Gráinne Uaile was replaced in 2017. The new lifeboat was the gift on Mr Peter Ross, in memory of his late wife. Mr Ross handed over the lifeboat to the care of Clifden RNLI at a naming ceremony on Saturday 21 October, when the boat was named Celia Mary (D-815). The boat would later be transferred to the relief fleet, when the Clifden D-class was withdrawn in 2019.

Another temporary lifeboat from the relief fleet was assigned to Clifden in 2019, but this time, it was a state-of-the-art €2.4 million Shannon-class lifeboat, 13-21 Brianne Aldington (ON 1328), which arrived on station on 17 August.

Clifden received their permanent All-weather lifeboat on 15 May 2022. Even before arriving on station, the lifeboat had carried out its first call, whilst on passage to Ireland, responding to a Coastguard alert, and escorting a small fishing vessel into Newlyn. The lifeboat had been funded in two ways, firstly, from the legacy of Mr Christopher Harris, and secondly, from the donations received to place 10,000 names within the numbers on the boat, known as the "Launch-a-Memory" campaign.

At a ceremony on Saturday 22 April 2023, the lifeboat was handed to the care of Clifden RNLI by Phillipa Harris, daughter of Christopher Harris, and then formally named 13-43 St Christopher (ON 1350).

== Station honours ==
The following are awards made at Clifden:

- RNIPLS Silver Medal
  Charles Mills, Chief Boatman, H.M. Coastguard, Clifden – 1847
- 'A Framed Letter of Thanks signed by the Chairman of the Institution'
  Bernard Whelan, Helm – 2000
  Bernard Whelan, Helm – 2007

== Clifden lifeboats ==
=== All-weather lifeboats ===
ON (Note: ON is the RNLI's Official Number of the boat.)	Op.No. (Note: Op. No. is the RNLI's Operational Number of the boat carried on the hull.)	Name	Built	On station	Class	Comments
1186	12-27	Pride and Spirit	1992	2014–2016	Mersey	Previously at Dungeness. Evaluation
1192	12-33	Fisherman's Friend	1993	2016–2019	Mersey	From the Relief fleet. Previously at Lytham St Annes.
1328	13-21	Brianne Aldington	2017	2019–2021	Shannon	From the Relief fleet.
1350	13-43	St Christopher	2022	2022–	Shannon	

More post-service details can be found on the respective lifeboat class pages.

=== Inshore lifeboats ===
==== C class ====
Op.No.	Name	On station	Class	Comments
C-505	Unnamed	1987–1989	C-class (Zodiac Grand Raid IV)	Evaluation
C-522	Unnamed	1989–1997	C-class (Zodiac Grand Raid IV)	
C-514	Unnamed	1997–1998	C-class (Zodiac Grand Raid IV)	

C class withdrawn in 1998

==== D class ====
Op.No.	Name	On station	Class	Comments
D-525	Holme Team IV	1998–2007	D-class (EA16)	
D-679	Gráinne Uaile	2007–2017	D-class (IB1)	
D-815	Celia Mary	2017–2019	D-class (IB1)	

D class withdrawn in 2019

==== B class ====
Op.No.	Name	On station	Class	Comments
B-575	John Batstone	1997–1998	B-class (Atlantic 21)	
B-512	U.S.Navy League	1998	B-class (Atlantic 21)	
B-551	Constance Macnay	1998–1999	B-class (Atlantic 21)	
B-751	Benjamin Dowing Fairbridge	1999–2013	B-class (Atlantic 75)	
B-869	Joyce King	2013–	B-class (Atlantic 85)	

=== Launch and Recovery tractors ===
Op.No.	Reg. No.	Type	On station	Comments
TW42	97-G-8631	Talus MB-764 County	1998–2004	
TW39	96-D-61119	Talus MB-764 County	2004–	

== See also ==
- List of RNLI stations
- List of former RNLI stations
- Royal National Lifeboat Institution lifeboats
- Talus Atlantic 85 DO-DO launch carriage

== Sources ==
- Leonard, Richie; Denton, Tony (2026). Lifeboat Enthusiasts Handbook 2026. Lifeboats Enthusiasts' Society.
