= Red Bay Lifeboat Station =

RNLI lifeboat station in Antrim, Northern Ireland

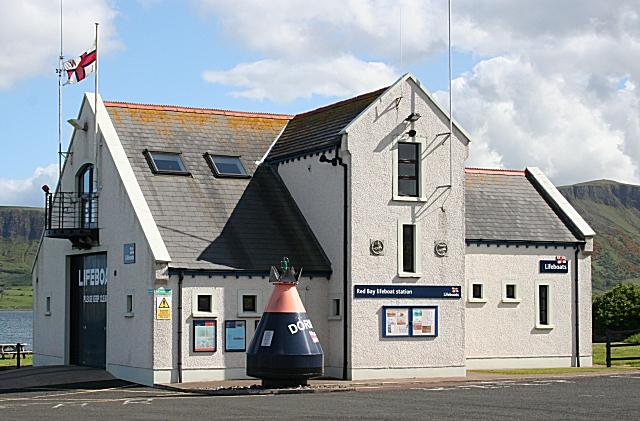
- Red Bay Lifeboat Station

- Location within Northern Ireland

General information
- Type: RNLI Lifeboat Station
- Location: Coast Road, Cushendall, County Antrim, BT44 0QW, Northern Ireland
- Coordinates: 55°04′29.9″N 6°03′12.4″W
- Opened: 1972
- Owner: Royal National Lifeboat Institution

Website
- Red Bay RNLI Lifeboat Station

Red Bay Lifeboat Station is located at Coast Road, Cushendall, County Antrim, a village at the mouth of the River Dall, in the Glens of Antrim, approximately 20 miles (32 km) north east of Ballymena, on the north-east coast of Northern Ireland.

A lifeboat was first stationed at Cushendall in 1972, by the Royal National Lifeboat Institution (RNLI).

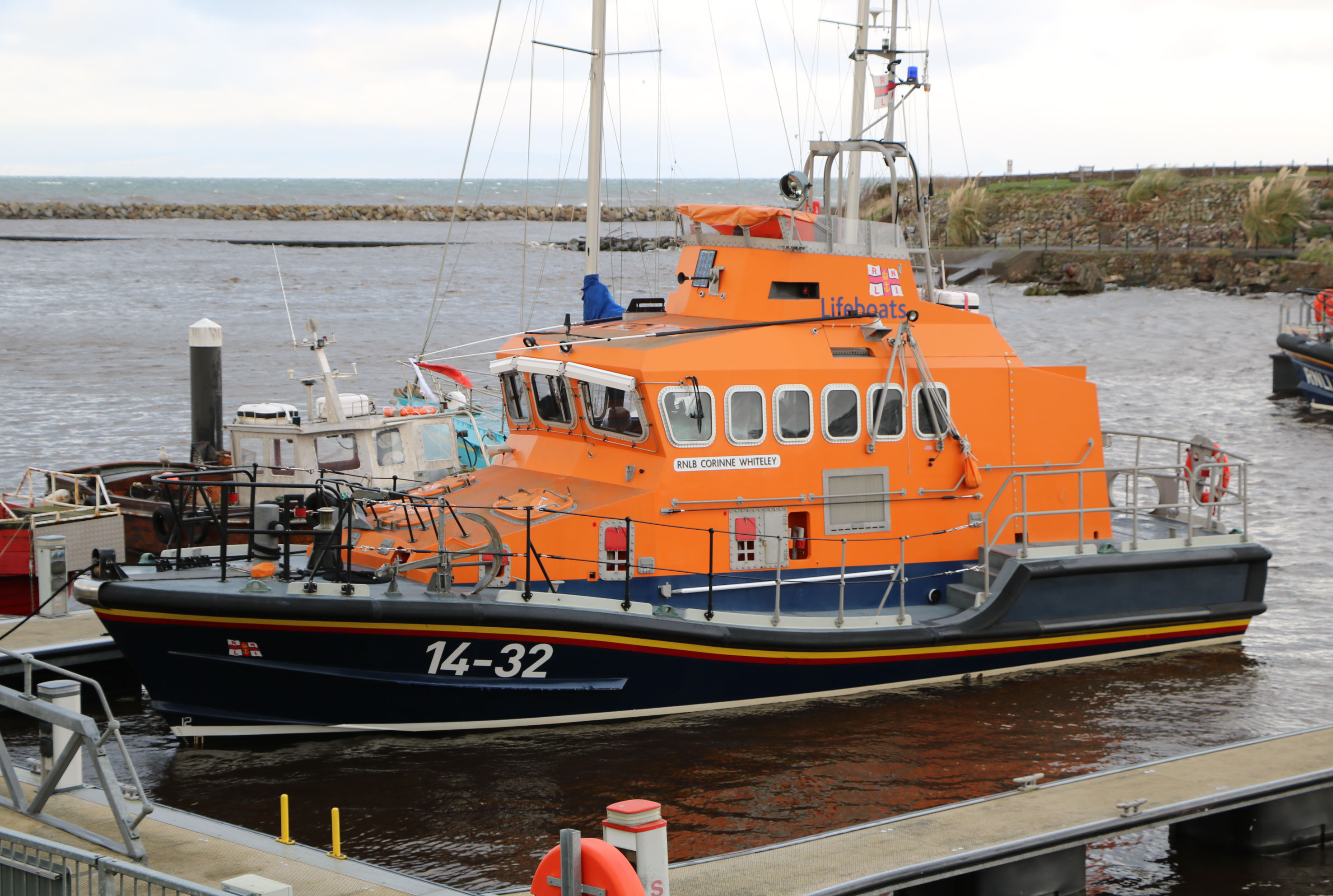
Trent-class All-weather lifeboat 14-32 Corinne Whiteley (ON 1253)

The station currently operates the All-weather Trent-class lifeboat, 14-32 Corinne Whiteley (ON 1253), on station since 2019, and the B-class (Atlantic 85) Inshore lifeboat Geoffrey Charles (B-843), on station since 2010.

== History ==
Even if no lifeboats were involved, the Royal National Institution for the Preservation of Life from Shipwreck (RNIPLS), founded in 1824 by Sir William Hillary, Bt., later to become the RNLI, made awards for outstanding sea rescues. Three Silver Medals were awarded for rescues off the Antrim coast, in 1840, 1851 and 1857.

However, it was only in 1972 that a lifeboat would be placed at Red Bay. In the 1950s and 60s, there was a boom in the amount of leisure boating activities. The RNLI had responded to this, by introducing the small fast inflatable D-class Inshore Rescue boats.

The area around the north-east coast of Northern Ireland was no exception, and 1962 would see the formation of the Cushendall Sailing and Boating Club. One or two close calls of people needing to be rescued, highlighted the need for a lifeboat. In 1972, the nearest lifeboat was 22 mi (35 km) away at Campbeltown on the Kintyre Peninsula in Scotland, with the nearest Irish lifeboats at Donaghadee and Portrush at least 32 mi (51 km) away. The Red Bay lifeboat committee was formed, to provide a lifeboat for the Glens of Antrim area.

In May 1972, the RNLI placed a D-class (RFD PB16) Inshore lifeboat (D-196) at Cushendall. At first the boat was kept in a small shed, until a boathouse and slipway were provided with the help of Moyle District Council. After a period of training for the 17 volunteers, during which the lifeboat was called out twice, at a ceremony at Meetson's Slipway, Cushendall on 26 August 1972, the boat was formally handed to the local committee, and the Red Bay lifeboat station declared operational. The first volunteers included no less than seven members of the McCollam family, and Joan Murphy, one of the first women lifeboat crew members in the RNLI.

The lifeboat would soon prove its worth, the first effective call being just 19 days after the official handover. On 14 September 1972, the lifeboat towed home a small motor boat with four people aboard, which had suffered engine failure 4 mi (6.4 km) offshore. A month later, a boat and two people were saved after their vessel capsized. Most D-class lifeboats having a service life of around 10 years, D-192 would serve at Red Bay for an extraordinary 15 years, saving the lives of 47 people in that time.

In 1985, trials began of a larger D-class lifeboat, the Zodiac Grand Raid IV, which was fitted with twin 40-hp engines, giving a top speed of 26 knots (30 mph). These would soon be re-designated as a C-class lifeboat. In 1987, D-196 was withdrawn, and replaced with Thomas Corbett (C-519). A C-class (Zodiac Grand Raid IV) would serve Red Bay for the next eight years.

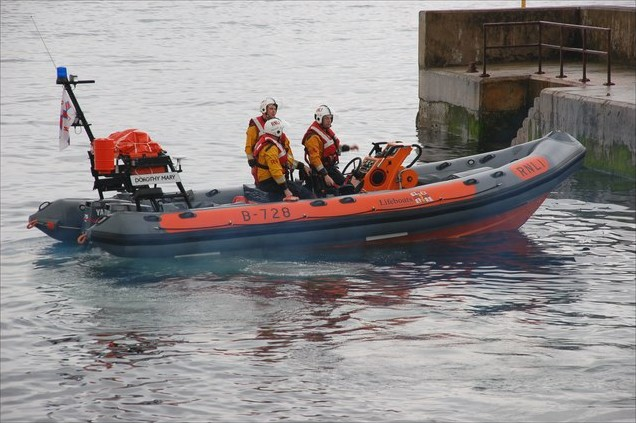
Dorothy May (B-728) 1996–2010

By the mid-1990s, the few C-class lifeboats on station were phased out, in preference to the twin engine Atlantic-class Rigid inflatable boat. Red Bay would receive an older Atlantic 21-class for training in 1996. At the same time, a new boathouse large enough to accommodate the Atlantic-class boats, along with the specially designed Talus MB-764 amphibious tractor, and Drive Off - Drive On (DO-DO) launch carriage. Red Bay's new Atlantic 75 lifeboat arrived on station on 3 September 1996. At a ceremony on 19 October 1996, the boathouse was officially opened, and the boat was named Dorothy May (B-728), having been funded from the legacy of Miss Dorothy May Raine and Mr David Stanley Raine.

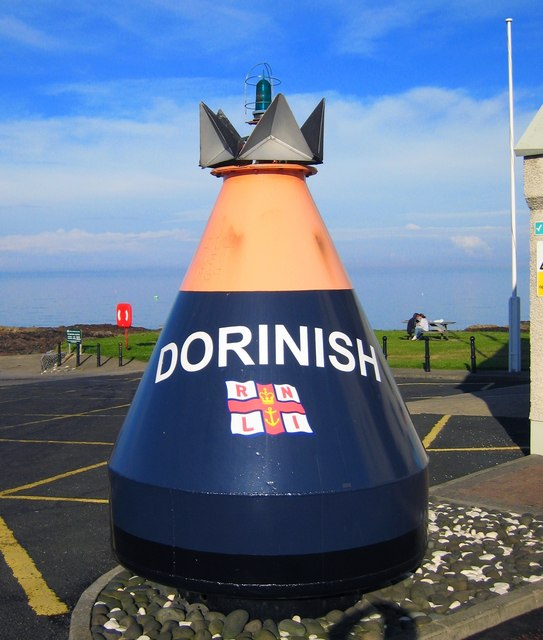
Dorinish Buoy

One of the more unusual items to be found at Red Bay lifeboat station is a large Buoy once operated by the Commissioner of Irish Lights. Dating from 1969, Conical Buoy No 131 spent the next thirty years moored in Clew Bay, County Mayo, warning mariners of the shingle bar at Dorinish More. Left to rot near Larne after it was replaced, it was 'acquired' by the crew at Red Bay, and towed up to the station by lifeboat. Blast cleaned, repaired, painted, with a working light and a slot cut in the side, it is now probably the largest RNLI donation box.

A ceremony was held at the lifeboat station at Cushendall on Sat 28 May 2011, to formally name the new B-class (Atlantic 85) Inshore lifeboat, which had arrived on station in 2010. Geoffrey Charles had been working as a Scuba diving instructor in Thailand, and was instrumental in rescuing many people, after the island of PhiPhi was hit by the 2004 Indian Ocean earthquake and tsunami. He died shortly afterwards, at the age of 32. The lifeboat was funded by Roger and Judith Colmer, in memory of their son, and to recognise the work he did saving lives at sea. The lifeboat was accepted into the care of Red Bay Lifeboat Station by Operations Manager Alan Murphy, and then with a bottle of champagne poured over the side of the boat by Judith and Roger's grandson Edward, the boat was named Geoffrey Charles (B-843).

Red Bay's Atlantic-class lifeboat would be called out 20 times in 2015, and 11 of these times were in the dark. Over 160 hours had been spent out at sea. Following a coastal review, it was decided to place an All-weather Trent-class lifeboat at Red Bay for a 2-year evaluation period, whilst retaining the Inshore boat.

Three years later, the allocation of a Trent-class lifeboat to Red Bay was made permanent, and in 2019, 14-32 Corinne Whiteley (ON 1253) from the relief fleet was made Red Bay's permanent All-weather lifeboat.

In 2024, Red Bay Coxswain Patrick 'Paddy' McLaughlin was awarded the MBE for his 43 years service to the RNLI.

== Station honours ==
The following are awards made at Red Bay (Antrim):

- RNIPLS Silver Medal
  Lt. William Lyons, RN, H.M. Coastguard – 1840 (Second-Service award)
  Lt. Arthur Kennedy, RN, H.M. Coastguard – 1851
- RNLI Silver Medal
  John Aitken, Commissioned Boatman, H.M. Coastguard – 1857
- 'The Thanks of the Institution inscribed on Vellum'
  Thomas McLaughlin, Helm – 2003
- 'A Framed Letter of Thanks signed by the Chairman of the Institution'
  D. McCollam, Deputy Launching Authority – 1991
  Tom McLaughlin, crew member – 1991
  Patrick McLaughlin, crew member – 1991
  Donald McAlister, crew member – 1991
  Liam McCollam, crew member – 1991
  Joe Ferris, crew member – 1991
  Peter McLaughlin, crew member – 1991
  Andrew McAlister, crew member – 1991
  Niall McCambridge, crew member – 1991
  Patrick McCambridge, crew member – 1991
  James Farrell, crew member – 1991
  Joe Burns, crew member – 1991
- Lifesaving Foundation 'Ireland Medal',
  awarded each year to an individual or organisation that has made a significant contribution to saving lives from drowning.
  Patrick McLaughlin, Coxswain, and RNLI Trustee – 2024
- Member, Order of the British Empire (MBE)
  Neil Ross Workman, Honorary Secretary – 1998NYH
  Patrick McLaughlin, Coxswain, and RNLI Trustee – 2025NYH

== Red Bay lifeboats ==
=== All-weather lifeboats ===
ON (Note: ON is the RNLI's Official Number of the boat.)	Op.No. (Note: Op. No. is the RNLI's Operational Number of the boat carried on the hull.)	Name	Built	On station	Class	Comments
1213	14-15	Henry Heys Duckworth	1996	2016–2019	Trent	
1253	14-32	Corinne Whiteley	2001	2019–	Trent	

More post-service details can be found on the respective lifeboat class pages.

=== Inshore lifeboats ===
==== D class and C class ====
Op.No.	Name	On station	Class	Comments
D-196	Unnamed	1972–1987	D-class (RFD PB16)	
C-510	Unnamed	1985	C-class (Zodiac Grand Raid IV)	Formerly D-510
C-505	Unnamed	1986–1987	C-class (Zodiac Grand Raid IV)	Formerly D-505
C-519	Thomas Corbett	1987–1995	C-class (Zodiac Grand Raid IV)	
C-523	British Diver IV	1995–1996	C-class (Zodiac Grand Raid IV)	

==== B class ====
Op.No.	Name	On station	Class	Comments
B-527	Percy Garon (Civil Service)	1996	B-class (Atlantic 21)	
B-728	Dorothy Mary	1996–2010	B-class (Atlantic 75)	
B-843	Geoffrey Charles	2010–	B-class (Atlantic 85)	

=== Launch and recovery tractors ===
Op.No.	Reg. No.	Type	On station	Comments
TW35	N506 WNT	Talus MB-764 County	1996–2002	
TW13	D948 SAW	Talus MB-764 County	2002–2009	
TW31	L526 JUJ	Talus MB-764 County	2009–2019	
TW30	L123 HUX	Talus MB-764 County	2019–	

== See also ==
- List of RNLI stations
- List of former RNLI stations
- Royal National Lifeboat Institution lifeboats
- Talus Atlantic 85 DO-DO launch carriage
