= St Catherine Lifeboat Station =

RNLI lifeboat station on Jersey, Channel Islands

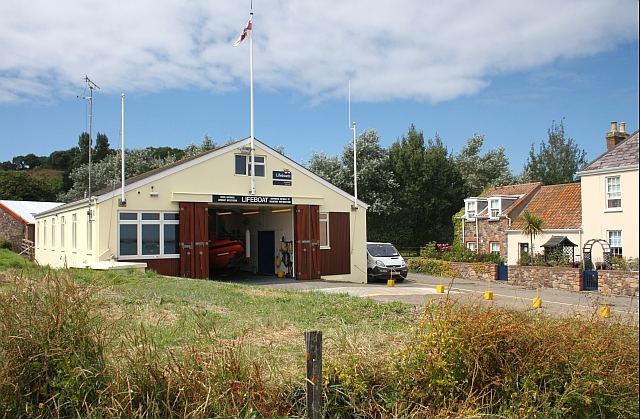
- St Catherine Lifeboat Station

- Location within Channel Islands
- Former names: St Catherine's Lifeboat Station

General information
- Type: RNLI Lifeboat Station
- Location: La Route de St. Catherine, St Martin, Jersey, Channel Islands, JE3 6DD
- Coordinates: 49°13′04.4″N 2°01′48.4″W
- Opened: 1969
- Owner: Royal National Lifeboat Institution

Website
- St Catherine RNLI Lifeboat Station

St Catherine Lifeboat Station is located on La Route de St. Catherine, on the north east coast of the island of Jersey, a self-governing British Crown Dependency and largest of the Channel Islands.

A lifeboat was first stationed here by the Royal National Lifeboat Institution (RNLI) in 1969.

The station currently operates a B-class (Atlantic 85) Inshore lifeboat, Eric W Wilson (B-841), on station since 2010.

== History ==
In 1964, in response to an increasing amount of water-based leisure activity, the RNLI placed 25 small fast Inshore lifeboats around the country. These were easily launched with just a few people, ideal to respond quickly to local emergencies.

More stations were opened, and in October 1969, a lifeboat station was established at St Catherine, with the arrival of a D-class (RFD PB16) Inshore lifeboat, the unnamed (D-167).

On the 14 April 1984, the St Catherine lifeboat (D-274) was replaced with a larger 17-foot 6in twin-engine D-class lifeboat, now known as a C-class (Zodiac Grand Raid IV). At a ceremony on 2 June 1984, the new lifeboat house was opened by Mrs Dorothy M. Bee, daughter of Mr F. H. Clarkson, founder of the Clarkson Jersey Charitable Trust, which had provided the funds for the boathouse. The lifeboat, named Sebag of Jersey (C-513) in memory of Mr Sebag Cohen, was then handed over to the RNLI, by his son, Mr Frederick E. Cohen. Lady Leeds then handed over a Land Rover, which was used to launch the lifeboat, donated in memory of her husband, Sir George Leeds.

Trials were held in October 1989, using the B-class (Atlantic 21) lifeboat and its Talus Drive-off Drive-on (Do-Do) launching trolley. St Catherine was designated as an Atlantic 21-class station, and relief lifeboat Lions International District 105 SE (B-539) was initially placed on station in 1990. Building work was completed to accommodate the larger lifeboat and Talus MB-764 County launch vehicle.

At 21:36 on 1 January 1994, St Catherine Atlantic 21-class lifeboat Jessie Eliza (B-587) was launched into very poor conditions and 30-knot winds, to reports of a surfer in trouble, 12 miles (19 km) away, off Plemont, to the north west of the island. Arriving on scene one hour later at 22:35, the surfer was found clinging to his board after a 15-minute search, the lifeboat being assisted by lights shining from the shore, and he was recovered to the lifeboat. With the rescued man showing signs of hypothermia, he was landed at Bonne Nuit. The man had also reported a second surfer, so the St Catherine boat returned to the scene to continue the search, along with the St Helier Tyne-class lifeboat, and the Channel Island Air Search aircraft. Nothing was found, and all were stood down at 01:30, to resume searches at daybreak. At 08:12, the pilot boat Ronez recovered the second missing surfer, over 10 miles (16 km) away from the initial position, near St Aubins Bay, on the south of the island.

Senior Helm Nigel Sweeny was awarded 'The Thanks of the Institution inscribed on Vellum', with crew members Paul Richardson and John Heyes receiving 'A Framed Letter of Thanks signed by the Chairman of the Institution'. All three were later awarded 'The Walter and Elizabeth Groombridge Award 1994', for the outstanding Inshore lifeboat rescue of the year.

On the 26 June 2010, Atlantic 75-class lifeboat The Eric Rowse (B-772) was replaced by the new larger B-class (Atlantic 85) lifeboat Eric W Wilson (B-841), funded from the bequest of the late Mrs Winifred Madge Wilson in memory of her husband. The lifeboat naming ceremony in 2011 had to be paused, as the lifeboat was called out to a speedboat in difficulties, 4 miles (6.4 km) north of the station.

Long serving St Catherine lifeboat man Nigel Sweeny was awarded the MBE in the 2014 Queens Birthday Honours. In 2017, he was appointed as St Catherine Lifeboat Operations Manager.

== Station honours ==
The following are awards made at St Catherine, Jersey

- The Thanks of the Institution inscribed on Vellum

Nigel Sean Sweeny, Senior Helm - 1994

- The Walter and Elizabeth Groombridge Award 1994
  (for the outstanding Inshore lifeboat rescue of the year)

Nigel Sweeny, Senior Helm - 1995
Paul Richardson, crew member - 1995
John Heyes, crew member - 1995

- A Framed Letter of Thanks signed by the Chairman of the Institution

Paul Richardson, crew member - 1994
John Heyes, crew member - 1994

Paul Richardson, Helm - 2000
Andrew Eeles, crew member - 2000
Lloyd Banks, crew member - 2000

- Member, Order of the British Empire (MBE)

Nigel Sean Sweeny, Lifeboat Operations Manager - 2014QBH

== St Catherine lifeboats ==
=== Inshore lifeboats ===
==== D-class and C-class ====
Op. No. (Note: Op. No. is the RNLI's Operational Number of the boat carried on the hull.)	Name	On station	Class	Comments
D-167	Unnamed	1969–1979	D-class (RFD PB16)	
D-274	Unnamed	1980–1984	D-class (RFD PB16)	
C-513	Sebag of Jersey	1984–1990	C-class (Zodiac Grand Raid IV)	Formerly D-513

==== B-class ====
Op. No.	Name	On station	Class	Comments
B-539	Lions International District 105 SE	1990–1991	B-class (Atlantic 21)	
B-587	Jessie Eliza	1991–2000	B-class (Atlantic 21)	
B-754	Pride of Sherwood	2000–2001	B-class (Atlantic 75)	
B-772	The Eric Rowse	2001–2010	B-class (Atlantic 75)	
B-841	Eric W Wilson	2010–	B-class (Atlantic 85)	

=== Launch and recovery tractors ===
Op. No.	Reg. No.	Type	On station	Comments
TW14	J 15014	Talus MB-764 County	1991–1995	
TW12	D508 RUJ	Talus MB-764 County	1995–1997	
TW13	D948 SAW	Talus MB-764 County	1997–2002	
TW01	J 72200	Talus MB-764 County	2002–2010	
TW09	J 93085	Talus MB-764 County	2010–2019	
TW04	J 93085	Talus MB-764 County	2019–	

== See also ==
- List of RNLI stations
- List of former RNLI stations
- Royal National Lifeboat Institution lifeboats
