= Helensburgh Lifeboat Station =

RNLI lifeboat station in Argyll and Bute, Scotland

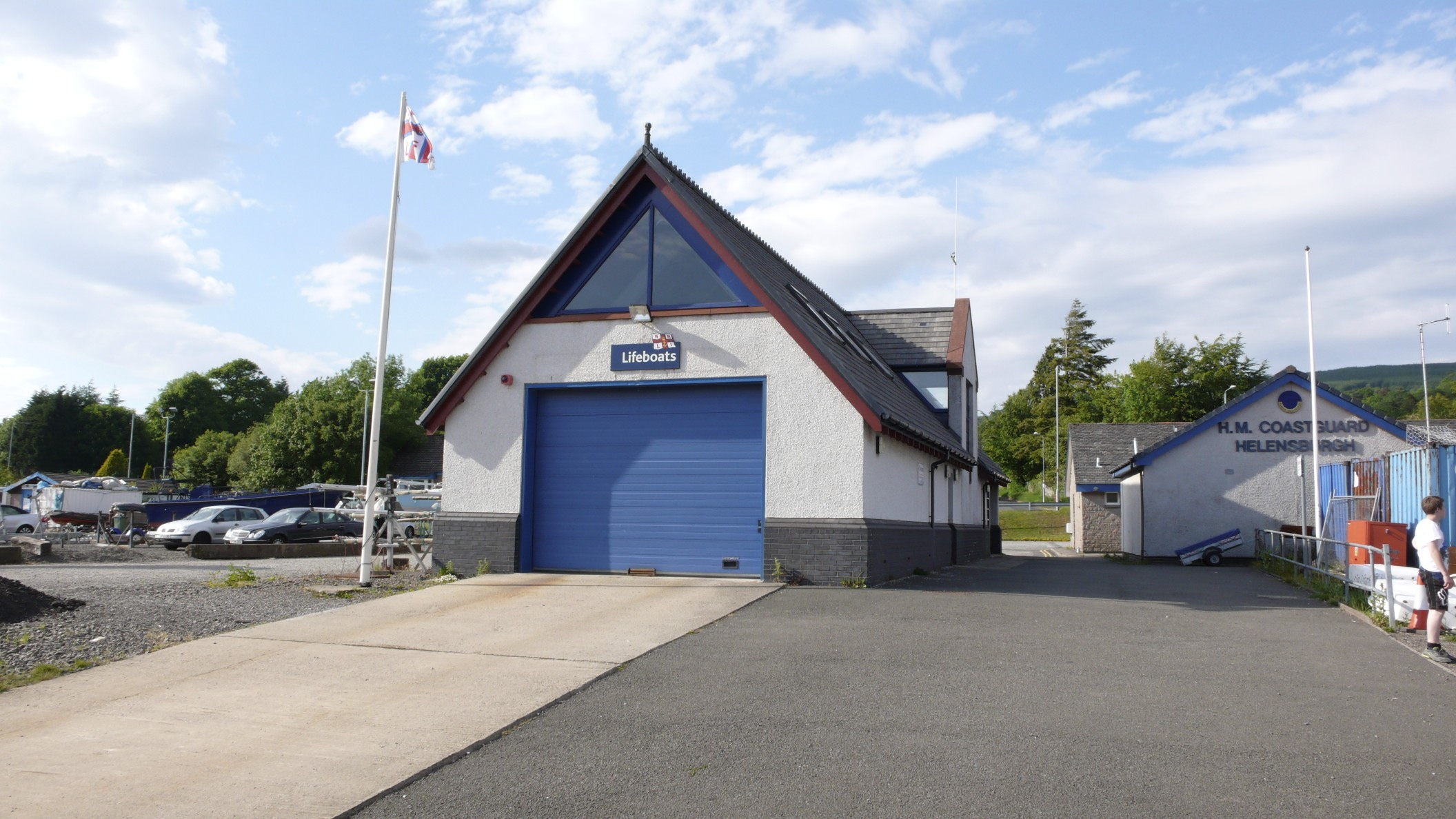
- Helensburgh Lifeboat Station

- Location within Argyll and Bute

General information
- Type: RNLI Lifeboat Station
- Location: Rhu Marina, Rhu,, Helensburgh, Argyll and Bute, G84 8LH, Scotland
- Coordinates: 56°00′46.8″N 4°46′24.5″W
- Opened: June 1965
- Owner: Royal National Lifeboat Institution

Website
- Helensburgh RNLI Lifeboat Station

Helensburgh Lifeboat Station is actually located at Rhu Marina, in the village of Rhu, approximately 2 miles (3.2 km) northwest of the town of Helensburgh. The station is situated on the north shore of the Firth of Clyde, at the entrance to Gare Loch, formerly in Dunbartonshire, now in the administrative region of Argyll and Bute.

An Inshore lifeboat was first stationed at Helensburgh by the Royal National Lifeboat Institution (RNLI) in June 1965.

The station currently operates a B-class (Atlantic 85) Inshore lifeboat, Angus and Muriel Mackay (B-903), on station since 2017.

== History ==
In 1964, in response to an increasing amount of water-based leisure activity, the RNLI placed 25 small fast Inshore lifeboats around the country. These were easily launched with just a few people, ideal to respond quickly to local emergencies.

More stations were opened, and in June 1965, a lifeboat station was established at Helensburgh, with the arrival of a D-class (Dunlop) Inshore lifeboat, the unnamed (D-66). The lifeboat had been funded by the local RNLI Ladies Guild.

In 1971, the RNLI sent a trial twin-engine lifeboat to the station. Formerly designated as a C-class lifeboat, this was later changed to B-class. These trial lifeboats have been come to be known as the Atlantic 17. Helensburgh had a succession of trial boats until 1978, when the Atlantic 21-class Round Table (B-543) was placed on service.

On 29 May 1989, the Round Table (B-543) was launched on a very unusual call-out. At 17:11, the lifeboat station was alerted by the Coastguard to a casualty off Port Glasgow. Covering the 7.5 miles (12.1 km) in 15 minutes, the lifeboat arrived to find a mechanical digger stuck in the mud. With the tide rising, only the cab and raised shovel were visible. One man was rescued and landed nearby.

Plans for the construction of a new boathouse on the existing site were drawn up in 1996. This would provide better crew facilities, along with housing for the larger Atlantic 75-class, due to be placed at the station in the future. Construction began in November 1996, being completed in June 1997.

The new B-class (Atlantic 75) arrived on station on 12 December 2002. It was funded from a bequest and named Gladys Winifred Tiffney (B-791) after the donor.

On the morning of 3 January 2012, a sudden storm, with winds of Force 11, ripped through the marina at Rhu, causing havoc. The lifeboat was called, but crew realised conditions were too difficult to launch the boat. With pontoons in the marina rising and falling by over 1 metre (3.3 ft), the crew crawled on their hands and knees to bring people ashore. For this service, and for his courage, leadership and motivational skills brought to the station since joining in 1968, Lifeboat Operations Manager Colin Gardiner was awarded the British Empire Medal.

Helensburgh would receive their latest lifeboat in 2017. Funded by the legacy of Mrs. Muriel Madeleine Mackay, at a naming ceremony on 19 May 2018, the lifeboat was named Angus and Muriel Mackay (B-903).

== Station honours ==
The following are awards made at Helensburgh.

- British Empire Medal

Colin Gardiner, Lifeboat Operations Manager – 2013NYH

== Helensburgh lifeboats ==
Op.No. (Note: Op. No. is the RNLI's Operational Number of the boat or vehicle carried on the hull.)	Name	On station	Class	Comments
D-66	Unnamed	1965–1968	D-class (Dunlop)	
D-132	Unnamed	1968–1971	D-class (RFD PB16)	
B-4	Unnamed	1971–1974	B-class (Atlantic 17)	Formerly designated C-2
B-7	Unnamed	1974	B-class (Atlantic 17)	Formerly designated C-5
B-6	Unnamed	1974–1976	B-class (Atlantic 17)	Formerly designated C-4
B-5	Unnamed	1976–1978	B-class (Atlantic 17)	Formerly designated C-3
B-4	Unnamed	1978	B-class (Atlantic 17)	Formerly designated C-2
B-543	Round Table	1978–1990	B-class (Atlantic 21)	
B-581	Andrew Mason	1990–2002	B-class (Atlantic 21)	
B-791	Gladys Winifred Tiffney	2002–2017	B-class (Atlantic 75)	
B-903	Angus and Muriel Mackay	2017–	B-class (Atlantic 85)	

== See also ==
- List of RNLI stations
- List of former RNLI stations
- Royal National Lifeboat Institution lifeboats
