= C-class lifeboat (Zodiac Grand Raid IV) =

Inshore lifeboat class of the RNLI

Class overview
- Name: C-class
- Builders: Zodiac Marine & Pool, France
- Operators: Royal National Lifeboat Institution
- Preceded by: D-class (RFD PB16)
- Succeeded by: B-class (Atlantic 21); D-class (EA16)

General characteristics
- Length: 17 ft 6 in (5.33 m)
- Beam: 8 ft (2.4 m)
- Propulsion: 2 x 40 hp Mariner outboard engines
- Speed: >26 knots (30 mph)
- Complement: 4

A C-class lifeboat usually refers to the Zodiac Grand Raid Mark IVs lifeboats, powered by twin 40 hp outboard motors, manufactured by Zodiac Marine & Pool of France, and which were operated by the Royal National Lifeboat Institution.

They were initially designated as D-class lifeboats, starting a series of boats numbered from D-500, but this was subsequently changed to C-class, to signify the difference between the twin engine C-class and the single engine D-class.

In 1970, the first lifeboats to be classed as C-class were twin engine RIBs, which were developed to be the Atlantic series lifeboats, and were re-designated B-Class. C-1 was renumbered as B-3, C-2 became B-4 etc.

The C-class Zodiac Grand Raid IV was replaced by both the D-class (EA16) and the B-class (Atlantic 21) inshore lifeboats.

== Fleet ==
| Op. No. (Note: Op. No. is the RNLI's Operational Number of the boat carried on the hull.) | Name | In service | Station | Comments |
|---|---|---|---|---|
| B-3 | Unnamed | 1970 | Littlestone-on-Sea | Formerly C-1 |
| B-3 | Unnamed | 1971 | Atlantic College | Formerly C-1 |
| B-4 | Unnamed | 1971–1974 | Helensburgh | Formerly C-2 |
| B-4 | Unnamed | 1974–1976 | Littlestone-on-Sea | Formerly C-2 |
| B-4 | Unnamed | 1978 | Helensburgh | Formerly C-2 |
| B-5 | Unnamed | 1972–1974 | Littlestone-on-Sea | Formerly C-3 |
| B-5 | Unnamed | 1976–1978 | Helensburgh | Formerly C-3 |
| B-6 | Unnamed | 1973 | Lymington | Formerly C-4 |
| B-6 | Unnamed | 1974–1976 | Helensburgh | Formerly C-4 |
| B-7 | Unnamed | 1974 | Helensburgh | Formerly C-5 |
| B-7 | Unnamed | 1981–1984 | Tynemouth BB | Formerly C-5 |
| B-8 | Unnamed | 1975 | Poole | |
| B-8 | Unnamed | 1977 | Poole | |
| D-500 | Unnamed | 1972–1974 | Trials | |
| D-500 | Unnamed | 1974–1979 | Minehead | |
| D-500 | Unnamed | 1979–1981 | Relief fleet | |
| D-501 | Unnamed | – | Trials only | |
| C-502 | John Gilpin | 1973–1975 | Trials | Formerly D-502 |
| C-502 | John Gilpin | 1975–1977 | Silloth | Formerly D-502 |
| C-502 | John Gilpin | 1977–1983 | Relief fleet | Formerly D-502 |
| C-502 | John Gilpin | 1983–1985 | Boarding Boat | Formerly D-502 |
| C-502 | John Gilpin | 1985–1988 | Inshore Lifeboat Centre | Formerly D-502 |
| C-503 | Unnamed | 1973–1977 | Trials | Formerly D-503 |
| C-503 | Unnamed | 1977–1979 | Silloth | Formerly D-503 |
| C-503 | Unnamed | 1979–1983 | Training fleet | Formerly D-503 |
| C-503 | Unnamed | 1983–1987 | Boarding Boat | Formerly D-503 |
| C-504 | Unnamed | 1973–1978 | Trials | Formerly D-504 |
| C-504 | Unnamed | 1978–1987 | Inshore Lifeboat Centre | Formerly D-504 |
| C-505 | Unnamed | 1979–1986 | St Abbs | Formerly D-505 |
| C-505 | Unnamed | 1986–1987 | Red Bay | Formerly D-505 |
| C-505 | Unnamed | 1987 | Relief fleet | Formerly D-505 |
| C-505 | Unnamed | 1987–1989 | Clifden | Formerly D-505 |
| C-505 | Unnamed | 1990 | Arran (Lamlash) | Formerly D-505 |
| C-506 | Unnamed | 1980–1986 | Portaferry | Formerly D-506 |
| C-506 | Unnamed | 1987–1988 | Arran (Lamlash) | Formerly D-506 |
| C-506 | Unnamed | 1988–1993 | Relief fleet | Formerly D-506 |
| C-506 | Unnamed | 1993–1997 | Boarding Boat | Formerly D-506 |
| C-507 | Unnamed | 1981–1988 | Mudeford | Formerly D-507 |
| C-507 | Unnamed | 1988–1990 | Relief fleet | Formerly D-507 |
| C-508 | The Chris Pirson | 1981–1992 | Relief fleet | Formerly D-508 |
| C-508 | The Chris Pirson | 1992–1996 | Boarding Boat | Formerly D-508 |
| C-509 | Oats | 1983–1993 | Aberystwyth | Formerly D-509 |
| C-509 | Oats | 1993–1994 | Relief fleet | Formerly D-509 |
| C-509 | Oats | 1994–1995 | Newquay | Formerly D-509 |
| C-509 | Oats | 1995–1996 | Tighnabruaich | Formerly D-509 |
| C-509 | Oats | 1996–1998 | Relief fleet | Formerly D-509 |
| C-510 | Unnamed | 1983–1991 | Criccieth | Formerly D-510 |
| C-510 | Unnamed | 1991–1995 | Relief fleet | Formerly D-510 |
| C-511 | Unnamed | 1984–1994 | Newquay | Formerly D-511 |
| C-511 | Unnamed | 1994–1996 | Relief fleet | Formerly D-511 |
| C-511 | Unnamed | 1996–2008 | Boarding Boat | Formerly D-511 |
| C-512 | Unnamed | 1984–1991 | Cullercoats | Formerly D-512 |
| C-512 | Unnamed | 1991–1996 | Relief fleet | Formerly D-512 |
| C-513 | Sebag of Jersey | 1984–1990 | St Catherine | |
| C-513 | Sebag of Jersey | 1990–1993 | Relief fleet | |
| C-513 | Sebag of Jersey | 1993 | Criccieth | |
| C-513 | Sebag of Jersey | 1993–1996 | Relief fleet | |
| C-513 | Sebag of Jersey | 1997– | Boarding Boat | |
| C-514 | Unnamed | 1985–1995 | Kinghorn | |
| C-514 | Unnamed | 1995–1997 | Relief fleet | |
| C-514 | Unnamed | 1997–1998 | Clifden | |
| C-514 | Unnamed | 1998 | Inshore Lifeboat Centre | |
| C-515 | Unnamed | 1985–1995 | St Bees | |
| C-515 | Unnamed | 1995 | Inshore Lifeboat Centre | |
| C-516 | Belsize Charitable Trust No.1 | 1986–1995 | St Ives | |
| C-516 | Belsize Charitable Trust No.1 | 1995–1996 | Relief fleet | |
| C-517 | Unnamed | 1986–1996 | Rye Harbour | |
| C-517 | Unnamed | 1996–1997 | Relief fleet | |
| C-517 | Unnamed | 1997–2008 | Boarding Boat | |
| C-518 | Unnamed | 1987–1997 | Cardigan | |
| C-519 | Thomas Corbett | 1987–1995 | Red Bay | |
| C-519 | Thomas Corbett | 1995–1996 | Relief fleet | |
| C-519 | Thomas Corbett | 1996–1997 | Tighnabruaich | |
| C-520 | Unnamed | 1988–1996 | Relief fleet | |
| C-520 | Unnamed | 1996–1999 | Boarding Boat | |
| C-521 | Prince of Arran | 1988–1998 | Arran (Lamlash) | |
| C-522 | Unnamed | 1989–1997 | Clifden | Private ownership, Clifden, Ireland, August 2024. |
| C-522 | Unnamed | 1997 | Boarding Boat | Private ownership, Clifden, Ireland, August 2024. |
| C-522 | Unnamed | 1998–???? | Publicity | Private ownership, Clifden, Ireland, August 2024. |
| C-523 | British Diver IV | 1990–1991 | Relief fleet | |
| C-523 | British Diver IV | 1991–1993 | Criccieth | |
| C-523 | British Diver IV | 1993–1994 | Relief fleet | |
| C-523 | British Diver IV | 1994–1995 | Tighnabruaich | |
| C-523 | British Diver IV | 1995–1996 | Red Bay | |
| C-523 | British Diver IV | 1996–1998 | Relief fleet | |

== See also ==
- Royal National Lifeboat Institution lifeboats
