= Tighnabruaich Lifeboat Station =

RNLI lifeboat station in Argyll and Bute, Scotland

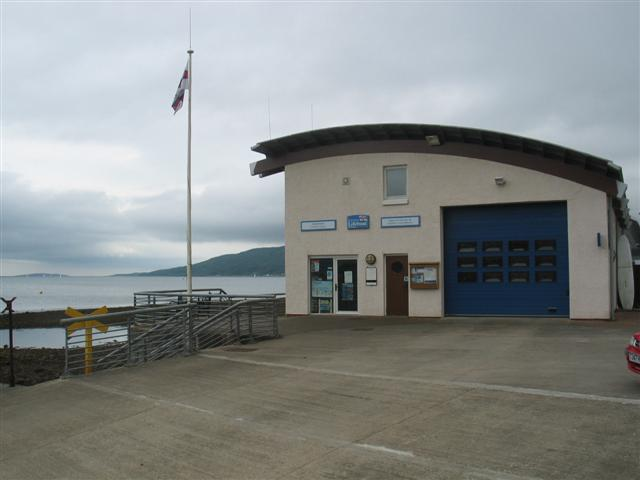
- Tighnabruaich Lifeboat Station

- Location within Scotland

General information
- Type: RNLI Lifeboat Station
- Location: The Harbour, Tighnabruaich, Argyll and Bute, PA21 2DR, Scotland
- Coordinates: 55°54′24″N 5°13′57″W
- Opened: 1967
- Owner: Royal National Lifeboat Institution

Website
- Tighnabruaich RNLI Lifeboat Station

Tighnabruaich Lifeboat Station is located at the harbour at Tighnabruaich, a village on the Cowal peninsula, on the Kyles of Bute, in Argyll and Bute, Scotland.

A lifeboat was first stationed at Tighnabruaich by the Royal National Lifeboat Institution (RNLI) in May 1967.

The station currently operates a B-class (Atlantic 85) Inshore lifeboat (ILB), the James and Helen Mason (B-862), on station since 2012.

== History ==
In 1962, the number of rescues or attempted rescues by All-weather lifeboats in the summer months was 98, with the number of lives rescued being 133. In 1963, in response to an increasing amount of water-based leisure activity, the RNLI began trials of small fast Inshore lifeboats, placed at various locations around the country. These were easily launched with just a few people, ideal to respond quickly to local emergencies. This quickly proved to be very successful. In 1963, there were 226 rescues or attempted rescues in the summer months, as a result of which 225 lives were saved.

More stations were opened, and in May 1967, a station was opened at Tighnabruaich, with a D-class (RFD PB16) inshore lifeboat (D-134) placed on service.

At a ceremony on 5 September 1887, the 20th anniversary of the station, a new type D-class (EA16) (D-345) Inshore lifeboat was presented to the station by Miss Helen Drew MBE of Newton Stewart, in memory of her late brother. Flying Officer Douglas Macmillan Drew, who died in action in 1944.

A framed record of thanks, and the Scottish Lifeboat Council's plaque, was presented on the occasion of the 20th anniversary of the founding of the Tighnabruaich Lifeboat Ladies Guild, accepted by Miss Aja Lushington, president, and crew member Andy Sim received his long service badge.

In 1995, the D-class lifeboat was withdrawn, and replaced with a C-class (Zodiac Grand Raid IV) lifeboat (C-509). The C-class was a development of the D-class, with twin 40-hp engines, giving an improvement in speed of around 7 kn (13 km/h; 8.1 mph).

However, the station was soon to be equipped with the bigger and better lifeboat, and in 1997, the station would receive the B-class (Atlantic 21) Blenwatch (B-549), on duty temporarily for familiarisation purposes.

In order to accommodate the bigger lifeboat, and its Talus MB-764 County launch tractor, new facilities were required. Plans were commissioned for the construction of a new larger boathouse. Building work started in November 1996, and were completed in August 1997.

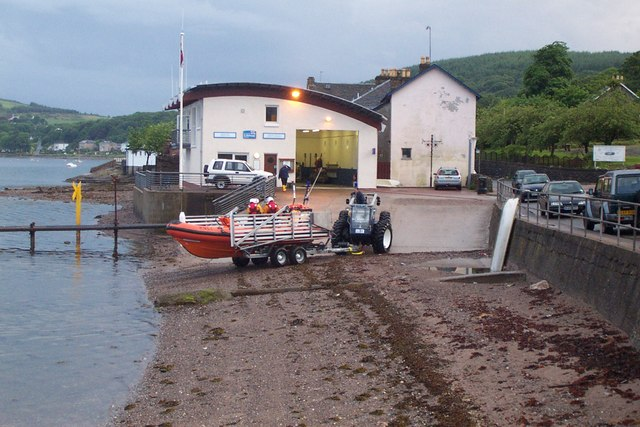
Alec and Maimie Preston (B-743) launching on exercise, 2004

On 8 August 1998, a dry sunny day after weeks of rain, a double ceremony was held at Tighnabruaich. The new B-class (Atlantic 75) Inshore lifeboat was handed to the care of the local branch, accepted by Honorary Secretary Ronnie Irvine.

Following a service of dedication, former Honorary Secretary Andy Sim cut the ribbon to formally open the new boathouse. The donors of the lifeboat, Mr and Mrs Preston, of Lancashire, had travelled up to the station, with Mrs Preston naming the lifeboat Alec and Maimie Preston (B-743) with a splash of whisky. The boat was then launched for a demonstration, and mock rescue, involving the paddle steamer Waverley.

In 2012, the station would receive the latest type ILB, the Atlantic 85-class Inshore lifeboat (ILB), James and Helen Mason (B-862). The lifeboat was funded from the legacy of Mrs Janet Wilson Smith of Helensburgh, in memory of her father and mother.

== Station honours ==
The following are awards made at Tighnabruaich.

- A special framed certificate, signed by Surgeon Rear Admiral F. Golden and the Chief Executive
  in recognition of his help and treatment of two seriously injured people, following a collision between a speed boat and rocks, on 10 July 2005.

Craig Allen, crew member – 2005

- Framed Letter of Thanks, signed by the Chairman of the RNLI

Andrew Fulton – 2005
Jonathan Pilkington – 2005
Catherine McVeigh – 2005

== Tighnabruaich lifeboats ==
Op. No. (Note: Op. No. is the RNLI's Operational Number of the boat carried on the hull.)	Name	On station	Class	Comments
D-134	Unnamed	1967–1979	D-class (RFD PB16)	
D-235	Unnamed	1979–1987	D-class (Zodiac III)	
D-345	Unnamed	1987–1994	D-class (EA16)	
C-509	Oats	1995–1996	C-class (Zodiac Grand Raid IV)	Formerly (D-509)
B-549	Blenwatch	1997–1998	B-class (Atlantic 21)	
B-743	Alex & Maime Preston	1998–2012	B-class (Atlantic 75)	
B-862	James and Helen Mason	2012–	B-class (Atlantic 85)	

=== Launch and recovery tractors ===
Op. No.	Reg. No.	Type	On station	Comments
TW41	P301 DAW	Talus MB-764 County	1997–2002	
TW35	N506 WNT	Talus MB-764 County	2002–2012	
TW40	P472 CUJ	Talus MB-764 County	2012–2023	
TW14	D659 TNT	Talus MB-764 County	2023–	

== See also ==
- List of RNLI stations
- List of former RNLI stations
- Royal National Lifeboat Institution lifeboats
