= Arran Lifeboat Station =

RNLI lifeboat station in North Ayrshire, Scotland

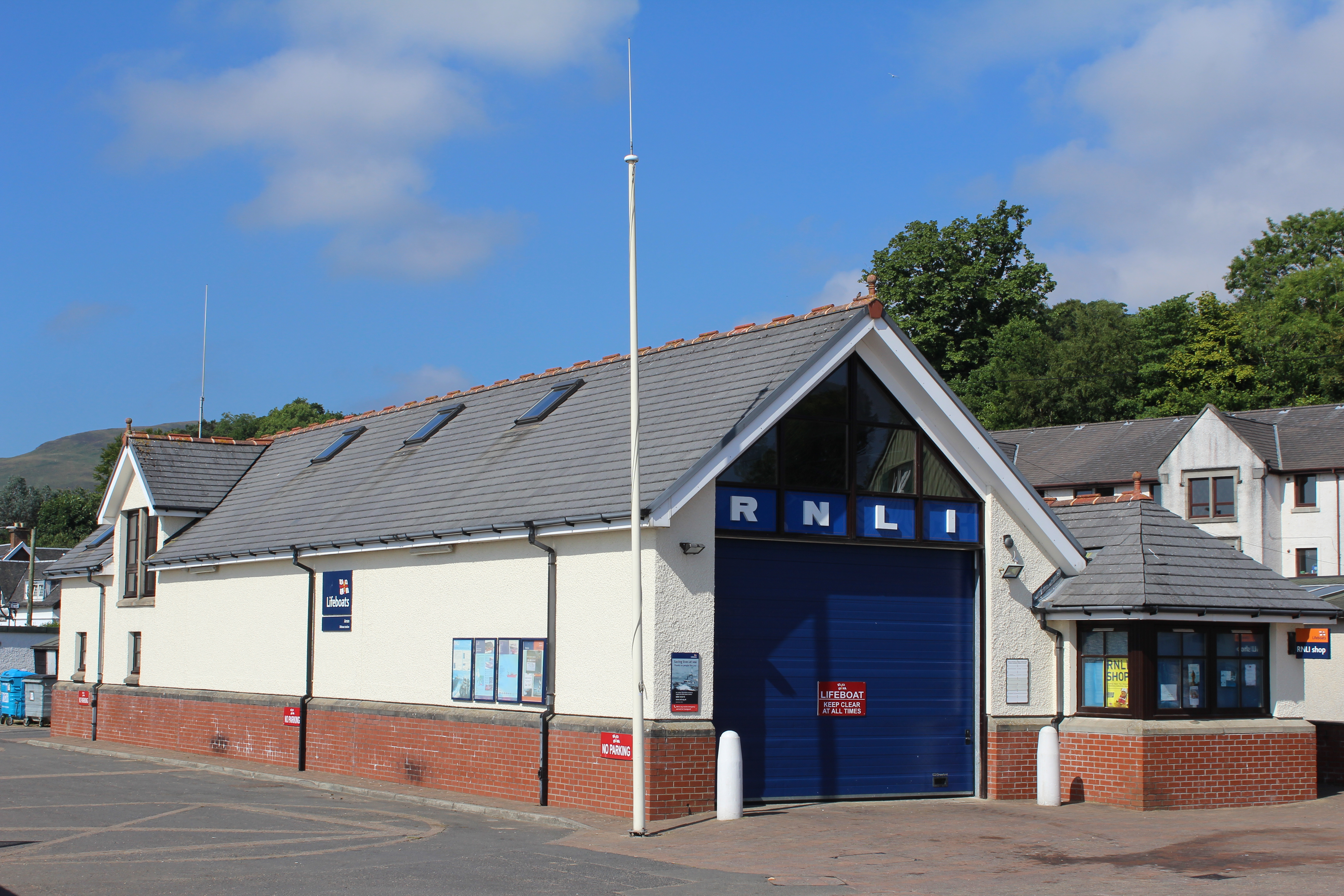
- Arran Lifeboat Station

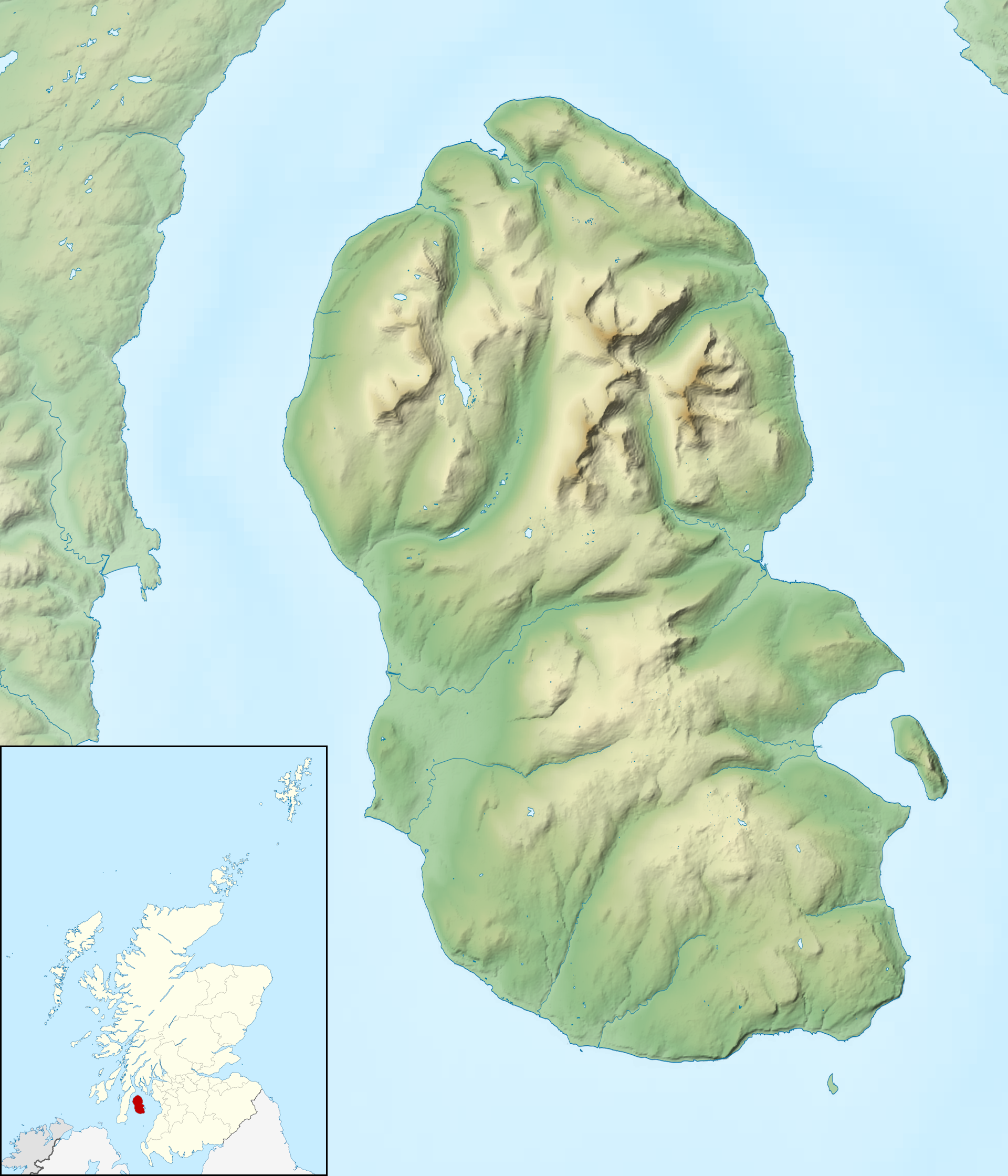
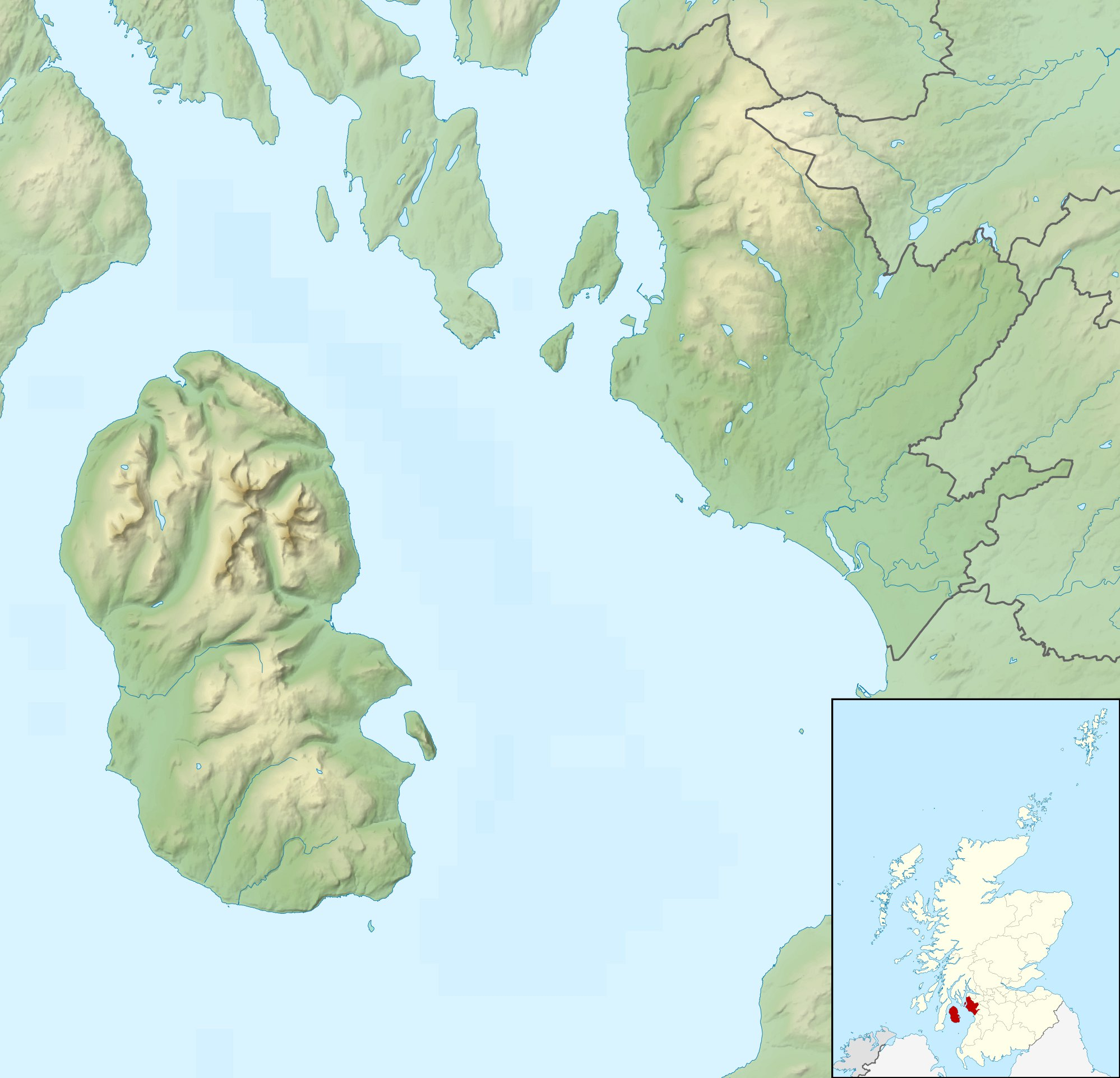
- Location within Arran Location within North Ayrshire

General information
- Type: RNLI Lifeboat Station
- Location: Lamlash Pier, Lamlash, Isle of Arran, Strathclyde, KA27 8JN, Scotland
- Coordinates: 55°32′06.8″N 5°07′29.2″W
- Opened: 1970
- Owner: Royal National Lifeboat Institution

Website
- Arran RNLI Lifeboat Station

Arran Lifeboat Station, sometimes known as 'Arran (Lamlash) Lifeboat Station', is located at Lamlash Pier in Lamlash, a village on the Isle of Arran, which sits in the Firth of Clyde, in the administrative region of North Ayrshire.

A lifeboat was first stationed on the Isle of Arran in 1870 by the Royal National Lifeboat Institution (RNLI), at the village of Kildonan, on the south coast of the island. The station closed in 1901.

An RNLI Inshore lifeboat station was established at Lamlash in 1970.

The station currently operates a B-class (Atlantic 85) Inshore lifeboat, Rachael Hedderwick (B-876), on station since 2014.

== History ==
In 1870, the RNLI established a lifeboat station at Kildonan on the Isle of Arran, which served for 31 years, until its closure in 1901. For further information, please see

- Kildonan Lifeboat Station.

In 1964, in response to an increasing amount of water-based leisure activity, the RNLI placed 25 small fast Inshore lifeboats around the country. These were easily launched with just a few people, ideal to respond quickly to local emergencies.

More stations were opened, and in 1970, Arran Lifeboat Station was established at Lamlash, with the arrival of a D-class (RFD PB16) Inshore lifeboat, the unnamed (D-185).

On 22 July 1984, Clyde Coastguard reported a drifting speedboat. The Arran D-class (RFD PB16) Inshore lifeboat was launched at 21:17, reaching the vessel at 21:40. The boat, which had been adrift for 5 hours after the engine ignition key had broken, was taken under tow to Lamlash, and the 5 occupants brought ashore, with one man taken to hospital with hypothermia.

A boathouse was constructed in 1985, and a larger twin-engined C-class (Zodiac Grand Raid IV) lifeboat (C-506) was placed on service temporarily on 24 September 1987. Six months later, on 17 Jun 1988, Arran would receive their permanent station boat, another C-class (Zodiac Grand Raid IV), which was named Prince of Arran (C-521). The Prince of Arran was the third lifeboat funded by the guests on board the vessels of Fred. Olsen Cruise Lines.

At 11:45 on 2 February 1992, the station was alerted by the Clyde Coastguard, to three capsized canoes in Brodick Bay, three miles north of the station, and that a fourth person was paddling to assist. Prince of Arran (C-521) was launched just eight minutes later at 11:53, into force-6 winds and choppy seas. Arriving on scene at 12:05, they found two abandoned canoes, and a female, who advised that a man and two boys were missing. The lifeboat continued the search, and the three casualties were soon found. All four were brought ashore, and transported to hospital by car, where one boy was treated for severe hypothermia. Helm Nigel Marshall and his crew of three, received written thanks "on a fine service, especially from the first aid aspect." from Commodore George Cooper, Chief of Lifeboat Operations.

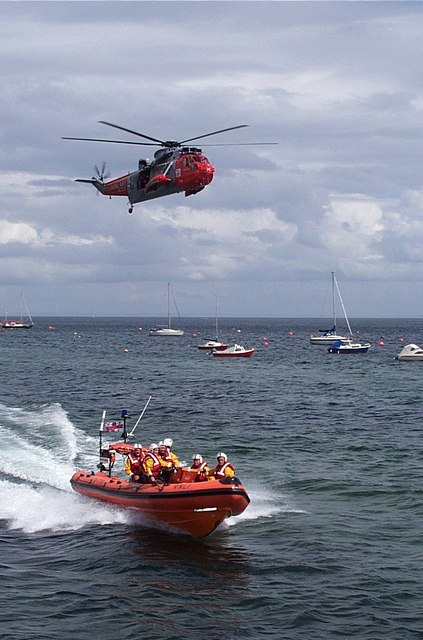
Lifeboat and Sea King at Lamlash

In 1997, a new boathouse was constructed at Lamlash. New crew facilities were provided, with a training room, and workshop, with increased boathouse space to house a launch vehicle, and the new B-class (Atlantic 21) lifeboat, which arrived on station the following year.

In 1998, the Boys' Brigade announced their appeal for the Millennium was to provide lifeboats for the RNLI. Each of the 1300 companies was targeted to raise £200. In the end, the total amount raised was £159,688.95, which funded the purchase of two B-class (Atlantic 75) lifeboats. The first of these was placed at Arran on 24 January 2001, and named The Boys Brigade (B-770). The second boat, Sure and Steadfast (B-789) was placed at Harwich in 2003.

Funded by the bequest of the late Miss Rachel Antoinette Hedderwick of East Saltoun, granddaughter of Sir Henry Duncan Littlejohn, a new B-class (Atlantic 85) was placed on service at Lamlash on 7 July 2014. The lifeboat was named Rachel Hedderwick (B-876).

== Station honours ==
The following are awards made at Arran.

- Member, Order of the British Empire (MBE)

Geoffrey Michael Norris, Lifeboat Operations Manager – 2012NYH

== Arran lifeboats ==
=== Inshore lifeboats ===
Op. No. (Note: Op. No. is the RNLI's Operational Number of the boat carried on the hull.)	Name	On station	Class	Comments
D-185	Unnamed	1970	D-class (RFD PB16)	
D-185	Unnamed	1971–1984	D-class (RFD PB16)	
D-303	Unnamed	1984–1987	D-class (RFD PB16)	
C-506	Unnamed	1987–1988	C-class (Zodiac Grand Raid IV)	
C-521	Prince of Arran	1988–1998	C-class (Zodiac Grand Raid IV)	
B-527	Percy Garon (Civil Service)	1998	B-class (Atlantic 21)	
B-592	Ernest Armstrong	1998–2001	B-class (Atlantic 21)	
B-770	The Boys Brigade	2001–2014	B-class (Atlantic 75)	
B-876	Rachel Hedderwick	2014–	B-class (Atlantic 85)	

=== Launch and recovery tractors ===
Op. No.	Reg. No.	Type	On station	Comments
TW03	RLJ 367R	Talus MB-764 County	1998–2004	
TW41	P301 DAW	Talus MB-764 County	2004–2013	
TW48	V281 EUJ	Talus MB-764 County	2013–2025	
TW02	LRU 581P	Talus MB-764 County	2025–	

== See also ==
- List of RNLI stations
- List of former RNLI stations
- Royal National Lifeboat Institution lifeboats
