= B-class lifeboat =

Class of RNLI inflatable lifeboats

A B-class lifeboat is any of a series of inflatable boats operated by the Royal National Lifeboat Institution (RNLI):

Boats in this series include:

- Atlantic 21-class lifeboat, the first generation RIB operated by the RNLI
- Atlantic 75-class lifeboat, the second generation RIB operated by the RNLI
- Atlantic 85-class lifeboat, the third generation & current production model RIB operated by the RNLI
