= D-class lifeboat =

Class of RNLI inflatable lifeboats

D-class lifeboats are a class of inflatable lifeboats operated by the Royal National Lifeboat Institution (RNLI).

Boats in this class include:

- D-class lifeboat (RFD PB16), 228 boats built from 1963 to 1984 (number range D-1 to D-310)
- D-class lifeboat (Dunlop), 11 boats built from 1965 to 1967 (number range D-59 to D-69)
- D-class lifeboat (Avon S650), 4 boats built in 1971 (numbers D-200, D-201, D-221, D-222)
- D-class lifeboat (Zodiac III), 64 boats built from 1971 to 1987 (number range D-205 to D-342)
- D-class lifeboat (EA16), 243 boats built from 1987 to 2002 (number range D-311 to D-576)
- D-class lifeboat (IB1), the latest boats built from 2001 (number series from D-600)
