= Case 1000D RNLI amphibious tractor =

RNLI Amphibious launch tractor

RNLI CASE 1000D
- RNLI CASE 1000D launch tractor T81
- Type: Lifeboat launch vehicle
- Manufacturer: Case Corporation
- Production: 13 (1962–1965)
- Length: 3330mm
- Width: 1930mm
- Height: 1670mm
- Propulsion: tracks
- Engine model: Leyland 600 6-cylinder diesel engine and Power Shift Transmission.
- Gross power: 100 hp (75 kW)

RNLI CASE 1000D is a continuous track amphibious launch tractor, which was specifically modified for the Royal National Lifeboat Institution (RNLI), to launch and recover carriage-mounted lifeboats, from beach-launch lifeboat stations.

First placed in service in 1962, they were operated at 20 different lifeboat stations, until the last two were retired in 1992.

== History ==
A total of 13 tractors were introduced into service with the RNLI over a four-year period from 1962 to 1965.

CASE 1000D amphibious launch tractor T81 (DLB 483C) in October 2026

The tractor is a highly modified marinised version of the standard Case model 1000 crawler tractor, manufactured by Case of Racine, Wisconsin. It was fitted with a marinised Leyland 600, 100-hp, 6-cylinder diesel engine, with the transmission through a torque converter and oil-controlled high and low speed clutches. The vehicle was made watertight to work in 5 feet (1.5 m) of water.

The intention was that the new CASE tractor would gradually replace the existing petrol-driven tractors, at those stations where the heavier type of Fowler tractor was not needed. A standard version was trialled successfully at Aberystwyth, Criccieth and Hoylake, and proved extremely satisfactory on different types of beach. Although its power was very much greater than that of the earlier launch tractors, the vehicle was approximately of the same size. This had the advantage that it was not necessary to make any major structural alterations to lifeboat houses, in order to accommodate the new tractors.

== CASE 1000D fleet ==
Op.No. (Note: Op.No. is the RNLI's Operational Number carried on the hull.)	Reg.No.	Built	In service	Station	Comments
T69	970 FGP	1962	1963–1973	Ilfracombe	Location unknown.
T69	970 FGP	1962	1973–1974	Ilfracombe	Location unknown.
T69	970 FGP	1962	1975–1977	Relief fleet	Location unknown.
T69	970 FGP	1962	1977–1981	Ilfracombe	Location unknown.
T69	970 FGP	1962	1981–1983	Minehead	Location unknown.
T69	970 FGP	1962	1983–1985	Storage	Location unknown.
T70	12 GXD	1963	1963–1972	North Sunderland	Location unknown.
T70	12 GXD	1963	1972–1981	Newbiggin	Location unknown.
T70	12 GXD	1963	1981–1985	Storage	Location unknown.
T71	519 GYM	1963	1963–1969	Cullercoats	Privately owned at Bourne, Lincolnshire
T71	519 GYM	1963	1969–1971	Redcar	Privately owned at Bourne, Lincolnshire
T71	519 GYM	1963	1972–1980	North Sunderland	Privately owned at Bourne, Lincolnshire
T71	519 GYM	1963	1981–1988	New Quay	Privately owned at Bourne, Lincolnshire
T71	519 GYM	1963	1988–1989	Storage	Privately owned at Bourne, Lincolnshire
T72	519 GYM	1963	1963–1965	Caister	Location unknown.
T72	519 GYM	1963	1965–1969	Llandudno	Location unknown.
T72	519 GYM	1963	1970–1981	New Quay	Location unknown.
T72	519 GYM	1963	1981–1983	Relief fleet	Location unknown.
T72	519 GYM	1963	1983	Wells-next-the-Sea	Location unknown.
T72	519 GYM	1963	1983–1991	Minehead	Location unknown.
T73	500 GYR	1964	1964–1965	Llandudno	Location unknown.
T73	500 GYR	1964	1965–1972	Newbiggin	Location unknown.
T73	500 GYR	1964	1973–1974	Ilfracombe	Location unknown.
T73	500 GYR	1964	1974–1977	Skegness	Location unknown.
T73	500 GYR	1964	1978–1981	Minehead	Location unknown.
T73	500 GYR	1964	1981–1985	Storage	Location unknown.
T74	136 HLC	1964	1964–1968	Minehead	In the John Myers Historic Vehicle Collection at Huddersfield, West Yorkshire.
T74	136 HLC	1964	1968–1971	Relief fleet	In the John Myers Historic Vehicle Collection at Huddersfield, West Yorkshire.
T74	136 HLC	1964	1971–1973	St Ives	In the John Myers Historic Vehicle Collection at Huddersfield, West Yorkshire.
T74	136 HLC	1964	1973–1975	Relief fleet	In the John Myers Historic Vehicle Collection at Huddersfield, West Yorkshire.
T74	136 HLC	1964	1975–1977	Ilfracombe	In the John Myers Historic Vehicle Collection at Huddersfield, West Yorkshire.
T74	136 HLC	1964	1977–1979	Skegness	In the John Myers Historic Vehicle Collection at Huddersfield, West Yorkshire.
T74	136 HLC	1964	1980–1986	North Sunderland	In the John Myers Historic Vehicle Collection at Huddersfield, West Yorkshire.
T74	136 HLC	1964	1986–1990	Filey	In the John Myers Historic Vehicle Collection at Huddersfield, West Yorkshire.
T74	136 HLC	1964	1990–1992	Storage	In the John Myers Historic Vehicle Collection at Huddersfield, West Yorkshire.
T75	AYP 704B	1964	1964–1966	Skegness	Privately owned in East Devon.
T75	AYP 704B	1964	1966–1968	Relief fleet	Privately owned in East Devon.
T75	AYP 704B	1964	1968–1978	Minehead	Privately owned in East Devon.
T75	AYP 704B	1964	1979–1991	Relief fleet	Privately owned in East Devon.
T76	BGO 680B	1964	1964–1965	Relief fleet	Location unknown.
T76	BGO 680B	1964	1965–1969	Caister	Location unknown.
T76	119 TMN	1964	1970–1980	Ramsey	Location unknown.
T76	BGO 680B	1964	1981–1986	Redcar	Location unknown.
T76	BGO 680B	1964	1986–1989	Relief fleet	Location unknown.
T76	BGO 680B	1964	1989–1991	Aberdovey	Location unknown.
T77	BGO 681B	1964	1964–1968	Criccieth	Preserved at Kirkleatham Old Hall Museum, Redcar.
T77	BGO 681B	1964	1968–1973	Relief fleet	Preserved at Kirkleatham Old Hall Museum, Redcar.
T77	BGO 681B	1964	1973–1978	St Ives	Preserved at Kirkleatham Old Hall Museum, Redcar.
T77	BGO 681B	1964	1979–1986	Filey	Preserved at Kirkleatham Old Hall Museum, Redcar.
T77	BGO 681B	1964	1986–1992	Criccieth	Preserved at Kirkleatham Old Hall Museum, Redcar.
T78	BYN 568B	1964	1964–1967	Cromer No.2	Location unknown.
T78	BYN 568B	1964	1967–1968	Filey	Location unknown.
T78	BYN 568B	1964	1968–1971	St Ives	Location unknown.
T78	BYN 568B	1964	1971–1981	Redcar	Location unknown.
T78	BYN 568B	1964	1981–1983	Relief fleet	Location unknown.
T78	MAN 2241	1964	1983–1990	Ramsey	Location unknown.
T79	DLB 481C	1965	1965–1966	Relief fleet	Location unknown.
T79	DLB 481C	1965	1966–1974	Skegness	Location unknown.
T79	DLB 481C	1965	1974–1975	Relief fleet	Location unknown.
T79	DLB 481C	1965	1975–1976	Pwllheli	Location unknown.
T79	DLB 481C	1965	1976–1977	Blackpool	Location unknown.
T79	DLB 481C	1965	1977–1985	Anstruther	Location unknown.
T79	DLB 481C	1965	1985–>1991	Relief fleet	Location unknown.
T80	DLB 482C	1965	1965–1968	Relief fleet	Location unknown.
T80	DLB 482C	1965	1968–1979	Filey	Location unknown.
T80	H359 MAN	1965	1980–1983	Ramsey	Location unknown.
T80	DLB 482C	1965	1983–1985	Relief fleet	Location unknown.
T80	DLB 482C	1965	1985–1986	St Ives	Location unknown.
T80	DLB 482C	1965	1986–1988	Relief fleet	Location unknown.
T80	DLB 482C	1965	1988–1992	New Quay	Location unknown.
T81	DLB 483C	1965	1965–1977	Anstruther	For many years in the Tim Matthews collection at Tring, Hertfordshire, but sold in Cheffins auction in May 2026, and now in private ownership in Exmouth.
T81	DLB 483C	1965	1978–1985	St Ives	For many years in the Tim Matthews collection at Tring, Hertfordshire, but sold in Cheffins auction in May 2026, and now in private ownership in Exmouth.
T81	DLB 483C	1965	1985–1991	Anstruther	For many years in the Tim Matthews collection at Tring, Hertfordshire, but sold in Cheffins auction in May 2026, and now in private ownership in Exmouth.

== See also ==
- Four Wheel Drive RNLI tractor
- Fowler Challenger III launch tractor
- Talus MB-H launch tractor
- Talus MB-4H launch tractor
- Talus MB-764 launch tractor
- Talus Atlantic 85 DO-DO launch carriage
- New Holland TC45 launch tractor
