= Hastings Lifeboat Station =

RNLI lifeboat station in East Sussex, England

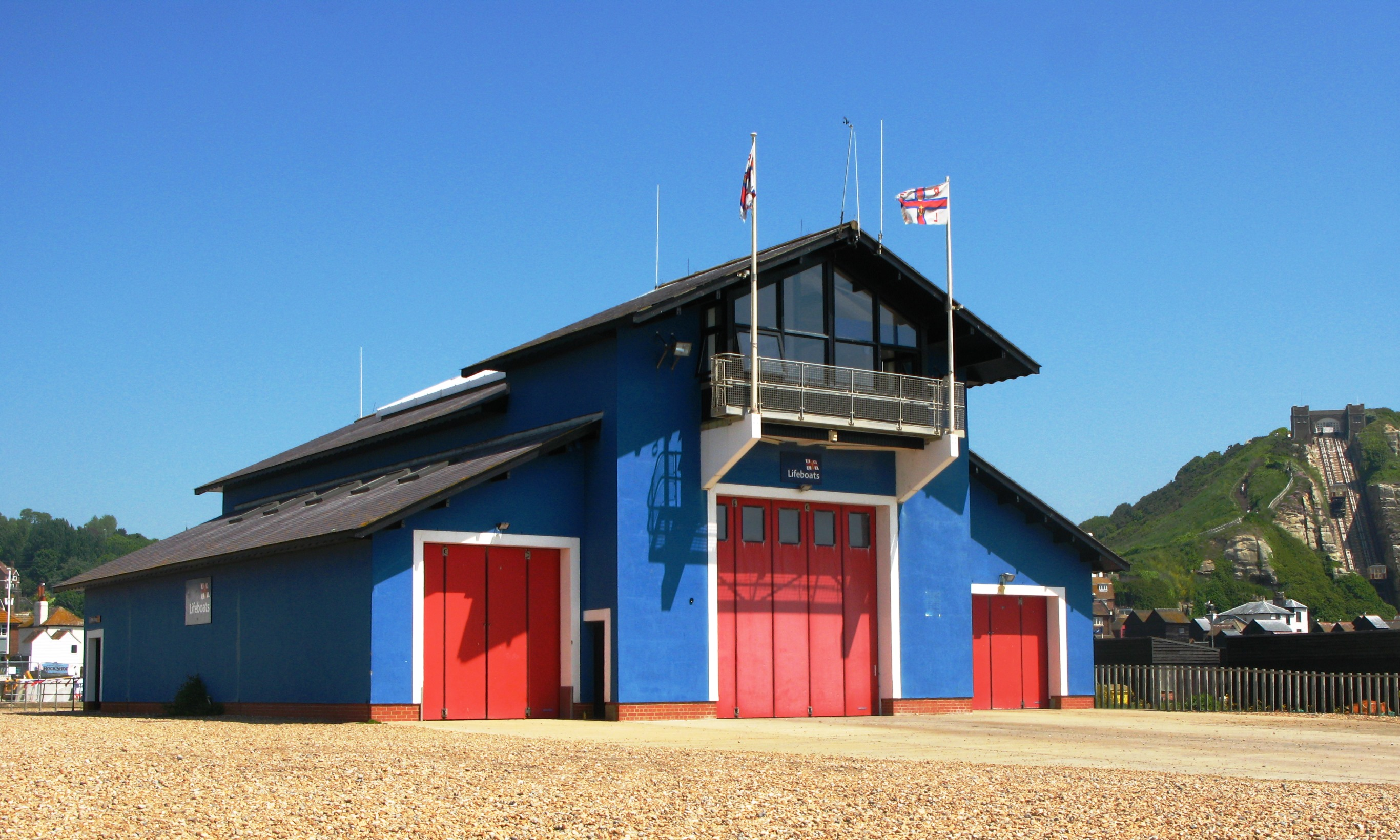
- Hastings Lifeboat Station

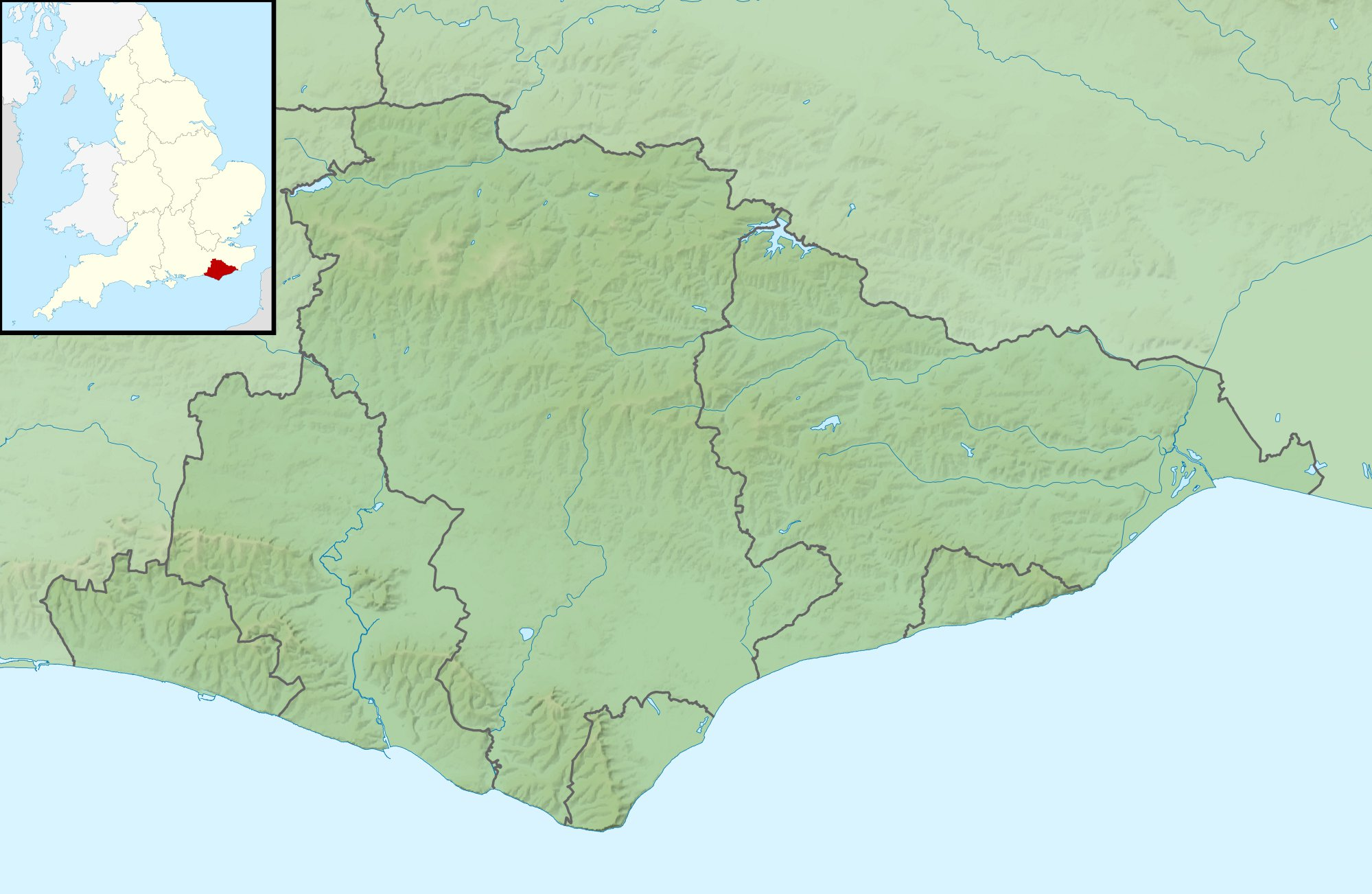
- Location within East Sussex

General information
- Type: RNLI Lifeboat Station
- Location: The Stade, The Winch Road, Hastings, East Sussex, TN34 3FJ, England
- Coordinates: 50°51′17.9″N 0°35′30.4″E
- Opened: 1858
- Owner: Royal National Lifeboat Institution

Website
- Hastings RNLI Lifeboat Station

Hastings Lifeboat Station is located on The Stade, in the town of Hastings, on the south coast of England in East Sussex.

A lifeboat was first stationed at Hastings in 1835, but after a period of decline, the boat was no longer fit for purpose. A new station was established by the Royal National Lifeboat Institution (RNLI) in 1858.

The station currently operates Shannon-class All-weather lifeboat, 13-28 Richard and Caroline Colton (ON 1335), launched off the beach using the Shannon Launch and Recovery System, and a D-class (IB1) Inshore lifeboat, Richard Francis (D-835).

== History ==
In heavy snow and violent seas, the French lugger La Constance was driven ashore at Fairlight on 19 January 1830, whilst on passage from Le Tréport to Dieppe. The following day, two coastguard officers led a team of men out in the surf, and rescued the Master and eight crew. Lt. John Prattent, RN, and Lt. Horatio James, RN, both of HMS Hyperion, were each awarded the RNIPLS Gold Medal.

However, just four years later, a Coastguard boat and her six crew were lost on 20 November 1834, whilst attempting to rescue the crew of the collier Good Intent. This prompted a local fund to be set up, raising £81, and a lifeboat was provided in 1835, built locally by Thwaite and Winter. There are no records of any service, and by 1851, the boat was deemed to be unfit.

On the 7 October 1857, the collier Draper, on passage from Newcastle upon Tyne to Falmouth, Cornwall, was driven ashore at Hastings, with the loss of all five crew. This again prompted local residents to re-establish a lifeboat, and a request was made to the RNLI, that a lifeboat be placed at Hastings. This was agreed at a meeting of the RNLI committee of management on Thursday 5 November 1857.

An order was placed with Forrestt of Limehouse, London to build a 30 ft (9.1 m) self-righting lifeboat, costing £161. A carriage was ordered, and a new boat house was commissioned at Rock-a-Nore, constructed by local builder Edwin Harman, at a cost of £137-10s. All costs were funded locally.

- Coord:50°51′21.9″N 0°35′47.2″W

The lifeboat arrived in Hastings on Easter Monday 5 April 1858, along with a carriage and her equipment, all transported free of charge by the London, Brighton and South Coast Railway Company. She was drawn on her carriage by a team of horses, and paraded through the streets of Hastings and St Leonards-on-Sea to the boathouse, where she was named Victoria by the Mayor. Mr. T. S. Hyde was appointed Honorary Secretary, and Charles Picknell to be Coxswain.

Victoria only served Hastings for five years, as she was found to be too small for the conditions encountered. In 1863, she was transferred to Palling in Norfolk, where she served for the following 18 years. Hastings were provided with a replacement unnamed boat, previously a 30 ft (9.1 m) 10-oared self-righting boat stationed at Kingstown (Dún Laoghaire). She was modified for Hastings by Forrestt and extended to 36-foot 4inches (12-oared), arriving on 7 August 1863, and again transported free of charge by the London, Brighton and South Coast Railway Company. In 1867, she was named Ellen Goodman in acknowledgment of the bequest of Miss E. Goodman, of Eversholt, Bedfordshire.

On her last service at Hastings, Ellen Goodman was launched on 18 February 1879, to the aid of the schooner Apollo, on passage from London, United Kingdom to Cette, Hérault, France, with a cargo of currants. Five crew were rescued when she ran aground and was wrecked near 'Rock-a-Nore'.

Following difficulties launching the lifeboat, a new boathouse costing £734-16s was constructed at the eastern end of the Marine Parade, officially opened on 3 July 1882.

Hastings would finally receive a motor-powered lifeboat in 1931, 22 years after the deployment of the first purpose-built motor lifeboat. The Cyril and Lilian Bishop (ON 740) was a 35-foot 6in self-righting (motor) lifeboat, built by J. Samuel White, with a single 35-hp 'Weyburn AE6' petrol engine, delivering a top speed of 7.25 knots (13.43 km/h; 8.34 mph). The lifeboat was the gift of the late Mrs Lilian Philpott, who bequested £20,000 to the Institution.

== 1960s onwards ==
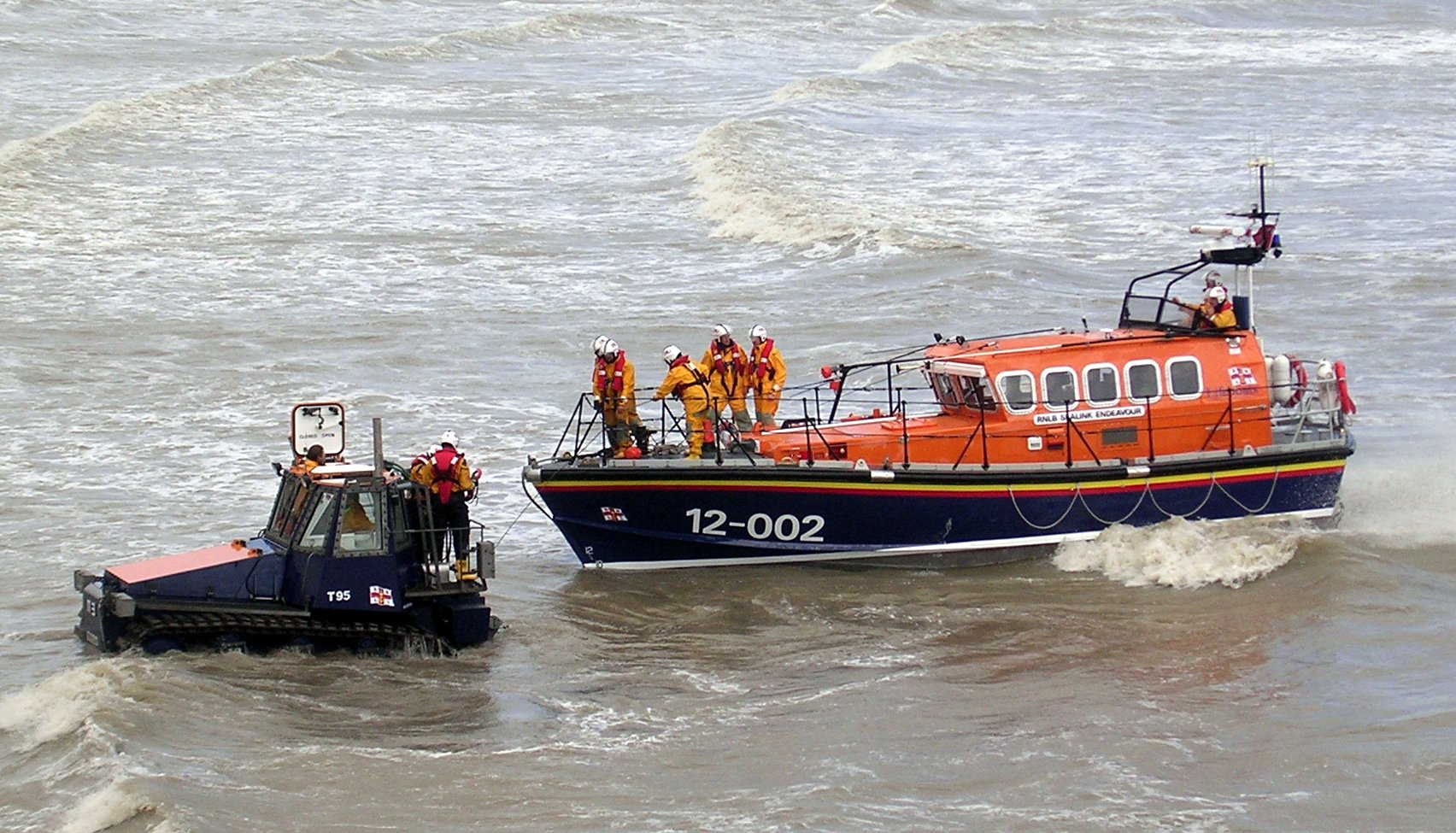
Mersey-class 12-002 Sealink Endeavour

Hastings was one of the first stations to receive one of the small fast D-class (RFD PB16) (D-21) inshore lifeboats in 1964. As was common at the time, the use of the inshore boat was seasonal, and so followed a succession of boats each year until one was permanently placed on service in 1975, a D-class (Zodiac III) (D-226).

The boathouse was modified in 1988, ready for the arrival of the new Mersey-class lifeboat, which was assigned to the station in 1989. She was funded by bequests from Dr. William Murphy and Mrs. Dorothy Kellet, and from a special promotion run by Sealink British Ferries, costing £498,625. At a ceremony on 21 September 1989, she was named 12-002 Sealink Endeavour (ON 1125) by HRH The Duke of Kent, President of the RNLI.

1995 would see the construction of a new boathouse on The Stade. The building provided housing for both the Mersey class lifeboat and launching tractor, the D class lifeboat, and a garage for the bulldozer. In addition to the new crew facilities, presentation/ training room, and workshop, the public could now view the lifeboat from a viewing gallery, and a souvenir shop was opened for fundraising.

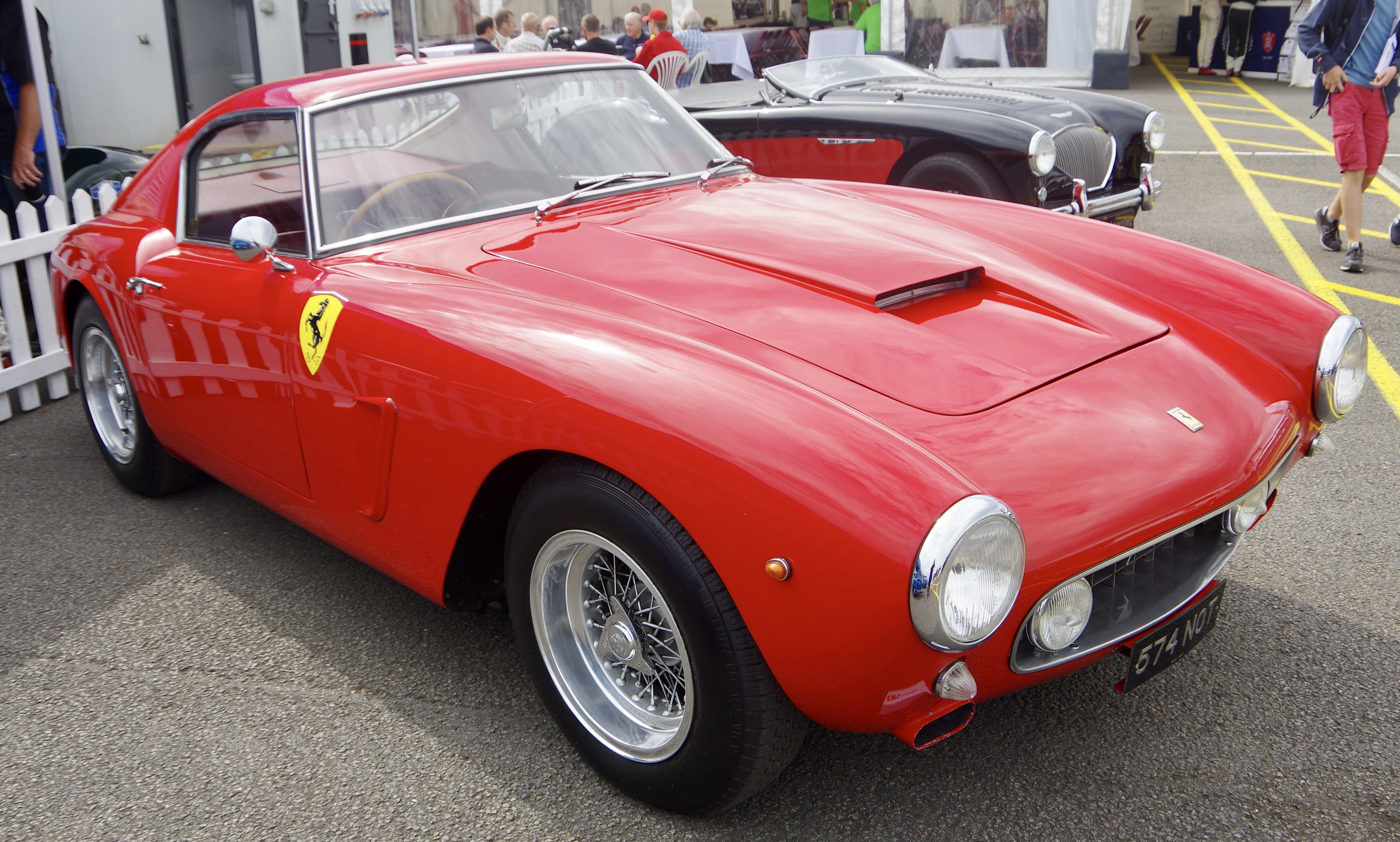
Richard Colton Ferrari

In 2015, the RNLI received the most valuable items ever left to the Institution in a single legacy.

In a most extraordinary bequest, the RNLI received two rare Ferrari cars from the estate of the late Richard Colton, businessman. Both were sent to auction:

- A silver 1967 Ferrari 275 GTB/4, sold for £1.93m
- A red 1960 Ferrari 250 GT SWB, sold for £6.6m

This has funded two Shannon-class lifeboats, the first being assigned to Hastings in 2018, 13-28 Richard and Caroline Colton (ON 1335).

In 2018, photographer Jack Lowe made images of the lifeboat and crew at Hastings Lifeboat Station using his Edwardian plate-glass camera. An image of Sloane Phillips, Deputy Second Coxswain, was accessioned into the collection at the Royal Maritime Museum at Greenwich.

On 1 October 2025, following a strategic review of resources across the UK, the RNLI announced that the Hastings Shannon-class lifeboat 13-28 Richard and Caroline Colton (ON 1335) would be withdrawn from Hastings in 2027, for redeployment elsewhere. The station will be receiving one of the new Mk.4 Atlantic-class Inshore lifeboats.

== Notable rescues ==
On 31 March 1943, Hastings lifeboat Cyril and Lilian Bishop (ON 740) was called to the aid of H.M. Trawler Caulonia, stranded off Jury's Gap, 10 miles east of Hastings, in a WSW gale, with rough seas and heavy swell. All kinds of obstacles had to be removed from the beach following War Defence work. The lifeboat was eventually run down the beach just as an enormous wave hit, and the boat was flung back on the beach. Finally the boat was launched, and made to the Caulonia. 17 men had already left in a liferaft. With wreckage all around, Coxswain Muggeridge managed to bring the lifeboat alongside for 30 minutes while the remaining seven crew were rescued. For this service, Coxswain John Muggeridge and Motor Mechanic William Hilder were both awarded the RNLI Bronze Medal. Only days after the rescue, Muggeridge was killed when his fishing boat hit a sea mine, and Hilder died in an air raid two months later.

== Station honours ==
The following are awards made at Hastings:

- RNIPLS Gold Medal
  Lt. John Prattent, RN, HMS Hyperion – 1830
  Lt. Horatio James, RN, HMS Hyperion – 1830
- Gold Medal, awarded by the Argentinian Naval Authorities
  Dr Peter Davy – 1974
- RNLI Silver Medal
  Alfred Stonham, Fisherman – 1904
  John Herbert William Martin, Coxswain/Mechanic – 1975
  Dr Peter Davy – 1974
- RNLI Bronze Medal
  John Edward Muggeridge, Coxswain – 1943
  William R. Hilder, Motor Mechanic – 1943
  George Douglas White, Second Coxswain – 1975
  John (Joe) Henry William Martin, Coxswain/Mechanic – 1985
- Bronze Medal, awarded by the Carnegie Hero Fund Trust
  Dr Peter Davy – 1974
- 'The Thanks of the Institution inscribed on Vellum'
  Cmdr. W. Highfield, OBE, RN, Honorary Secretary – 1943
  Edward F. Adams, Second Coxswain – 1943
  Fred White, Bowman – 1943
  Hasting Lifeboat Crew – 1975
  Christopher Cooper, Helm – 1985
  Graham Furness, crew member – 1985
  Steven Martin, crew member – 1985
  David John Curtis, Assistant Mechanic – 1991
  Simon Hodgson, Helm – 2007
- 'A Framed Letter of Thanks signed by the Chairman of the Institution'
  J. H. Martin, Motor Mechanic – 1965
  S. Ferguson, Police Sergeant – 1965
  J. H. Martin, Motor Mechanic – 1967
  W. Adams – 1967
  R. Shoesmith, ILB crew – 1972
  C. Green, ILB crew – 1972
  K. Ronchett, ILB crew – 1972
  Fred White, Coxswain – 1991
  Sloane Phillips, crew member – 2007
  Glenn Barry, crew member – 2007
- 'Letters of Thanks signed by the Secretary of the Institution'
  John Martin, Coxswain/Mechanic – 1972
  B. Foster – 1972
  R. White – 1972
  F. Davis – 1972
  J. Mitchell – 1972
  R. Taylor – 1972
- Testimonial on Parchment, awarded by the Royal Humane Society
  S. Ferguson, Police Sergeant – 1965
- Resuscitation Certificate, awarded by the Royal Humane Society
  S. Ferguson, Police Sergeant – 1965
  John H. Martin, Motor Mechanic – 1965
- British Empire Medal
  John H. W. Martin, Coxswain Mechanic – 1987NYH

== Roll of honour ==
In memory of those lost whilst serving at Hastings:

- Lost when their boat capsized attempting to rescue the crew of the collier Good Intent on 20 November 1834.
  Six coastguard men.

== Hastings lifeboats ==
=== Pulling and Sailing (P&S) lifeboats ===
ON (Note: ON is the RNLI's Official Number of the boat.)	Name	Built	On station	Class	Comments
−	Ariel?	1835	c.1835−c.1851	Unknown	(Note: Lifeboat of unknown dimensions, funded by local subscription, and built locally by Thwaite and Winter of Hastings.)
Pre-314	Victoria	1857	1858−1863	30-foot Peake self-righting (P&S)	(Note: 30 ft 0 in (9.14 m) x 7 ft 6 in (2.29 m) (10-oared) Peake-class self-righting (P&S) lifeboat, funded by the RNLI, built by Forrestt of Limehouse, London, costing £161.); Transferred to Palling.
Pre-281	Unnamed	1854	1863−1867	36-foot 4in self-righting (P&S)	(Note: 30 ft 0 in (9.14 m) x 8 ft 0 in (2.44 m) (10-oared) Peake-class self-righting (P&S) lifeboat, funded by the RNLI, built by Forrestt of Limehouse, London, costing £150 when new. Lengthened to 36 ft 4 in (11.07 m) x 8 ft 2 in (2.49 m) (12-oared) by Forrestt in 1863.); Previously at Kingstown. Renamed Ellen Goodman in 1867.
Pre-281	Ellen Goodman	1854	1867−1880	36-foot 4in self-righting (P&S)	(Note: Gift of Miss E. Goodman of Eversholt, Bedfordshire.); Returned to London in 1880.
187	Charles Arkcoll	1880	1880−1901	34-foot self-righting (P&S)	(Note: 34 ft 0 in (10.36 m) x 8 ft 3 in (2.51 m) (10-oared) self-righting (P&S) lifeboat, gift of Mr C. Arkcoll of Chatham, built by Woolfe of Shadwell, London, costing £363.); Broken up in 1902.
469	Charles Arkcoll	1901	1901−1931	35-foot self-righting (P&S)	(Note: 35 ft 0 in (10.67 m) x 8 ft 8 in (2.64 m) (10-oared) self-righting (P&S) lifeboat, gift of Mr C. Arkcoll of Chatham, built by Thames Ironworks of Blackwall, London, costing £844.); Sold in 1931. Renamed Viking Sundancer. Broken up at Port Falmouth in October 2001.

Pre ON numbers are unofficial numbers used by the Lifeboat Enthusiast Society to reference early lifeboats not included on the official RNLI list.

=== Motor lifeboats ===
ON	Op.No. (Note: Op.No. is the RNLI's Operational Number of the boat carried on the hull.)	Name	On station	Class	Comments
740	−	Cyril and Lilian Bishop	1931−1950	35-foot 6in self-righting (motor)	
878	−	M. T. C.	1950−1963	35-foot 6in self-righting (motor)	M.T.C. was named for the Mechanised Transport Corps.
795	−	Frank and William Oates	1963−1964	Liverpool	Previously at Eyemouth, Girvan, and the Relief fleet.
973	37-06	Fairlight	1964−1988	Oakley	Transferred to the Relief fleet. Later at St Ives and New Quay.
984	37-17	Mary Joicey	1988−1989	Oakley	Relief fleet lifeboat. First deployed to Newbiggin.
1125	12-002	Sealink Endeavour	1989−2018	Mersey	First used for Trials.
1335	13-28	Richard and Caroline Colton	2018−	Shannon	

More post-service details can be found on the respective lifeboat class pages.

=== Inshore lifeboats ===
==== D class ====
Op.No.	Name	On station	Class	Comments
D-21	Unnamed	1964	D-class (RFD PB16)	
D-25	Unnamed	1965	D-class (RFD PB16)	
D-27	Unnamed	1965−1967	D-class (RFD PB16)	
D-11	Unnamed	1967	D-class (RFD PB16)	
D-143	Unnamed	1967−1975	D-class (RFD PB16)	
D-226	Unnamed	1975−1982	D-class (Zodiac III)	
D-288	Cinque Ports I	1983−1989	D-class (Zodiac III)	
D-392	Cecile Rampton	1989−1998	D-class (EA16)	
D-540	Cecile Rampton II	1998−2008	D-class (EA16)	
D-699	Daphne May	2008−2019	D-class (IB1)	
D-835	Richard Francis	2019−	D-class (IB1)	

==== B class ====
Op.No.	Name	On station	Class	Comments
B-814	Sheila Stenhouse	2026−	B-class (Atlantic 85)	Training

=== Launch and recovery tractors ===
Op.No.	Reg.No.	Type	On station	Comments
T65	VYT 878	Fowler Challenger III	1963–1970	
T57	NYE 351	Fowler Challenger III	1970–1972	
T65	VYT 878	Fowler Challenger III	1972–1973	On display in the RNLI Heritage Collection at Chatham Historic Dockyard
T60	OXO 323	Fowler Challenger III	1973–1974	
T65	VYT 878	Fowler Challenger III	1974–1985	
T95	B188 GAW	Talus MB-H Crawler	1985	
T96	B688 HUJ	Talus MB-H Crawler	1985–1997	
T95	B188 GAW	Talus MB-H Crawler	1997–2007	
T119	N470 XAW	Talus MB-H Crawler	2007–2019	
SC-T16	HF18 DYS	SLARS (Clayton)	2018–	Named Richard and Mark Colton
T92	A462 AUX	Talus MB-H Crawler	2026–	

== See also ==
- List of RNLI stations
- List of former RNLI stations
- Royal National Lifeboat Institution lifeboats
- Talus Atlantic 85 DO-DO launch carriage
