= Fowler Challenger III amphibious tractor =

RNLI Amphibious launch tractor

RNLI Fowler Challenger III
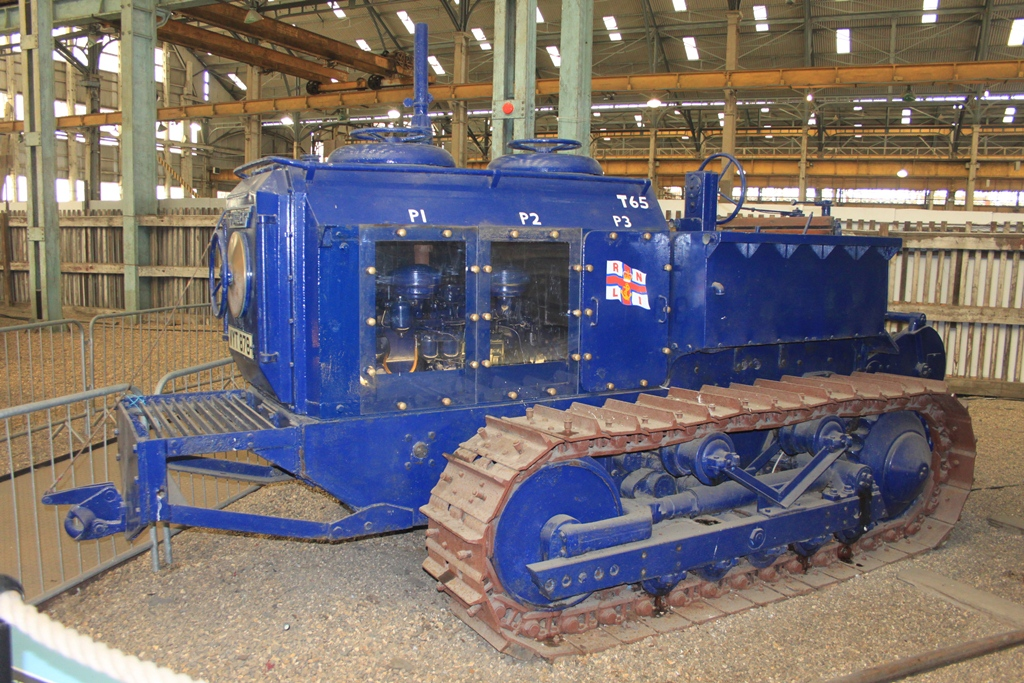
- RNLI Fowler tractor T65 (VYT 878) in the RNLI Heritage Collection, Chatham
- Type: Lifeboat launch vehicle
- Manufacturer: John Fowler & Co.
- Production: 13 (1952–1960)
- Weight: 14 tonnes with track pads
- Propulsion: tracks
- Engine model: Meadows 6 DC630 95-hp
- Gross power: 95 hp (71 kW)
- Drawbar pull: 17 tonnes

RNLI Fowler Challenger III is a continuous track amphibious launch tractor, which was specifically designed for the Royal National Lifeboat Institution (RNLI), to launch and recover carriage mounted lifeboats, from beach-launch lifeboat stations.

First placed in service in 1953, they were operated at 20 different lifeboat stations, until the last ones were retired in 1989.

RNLI Fowler Challenger III T68 in August 2026 (photo: Henry Mock)

== History ==
A total of 13 tractors were introduced into service with the RNLI, over an eight-year period from 1953 to 1960. The tractor is a highly modified version of the standard 95-bhp Fowler Challenger III diesel crawler tractor, manufactured by John Fowler & Co. of Leeds.

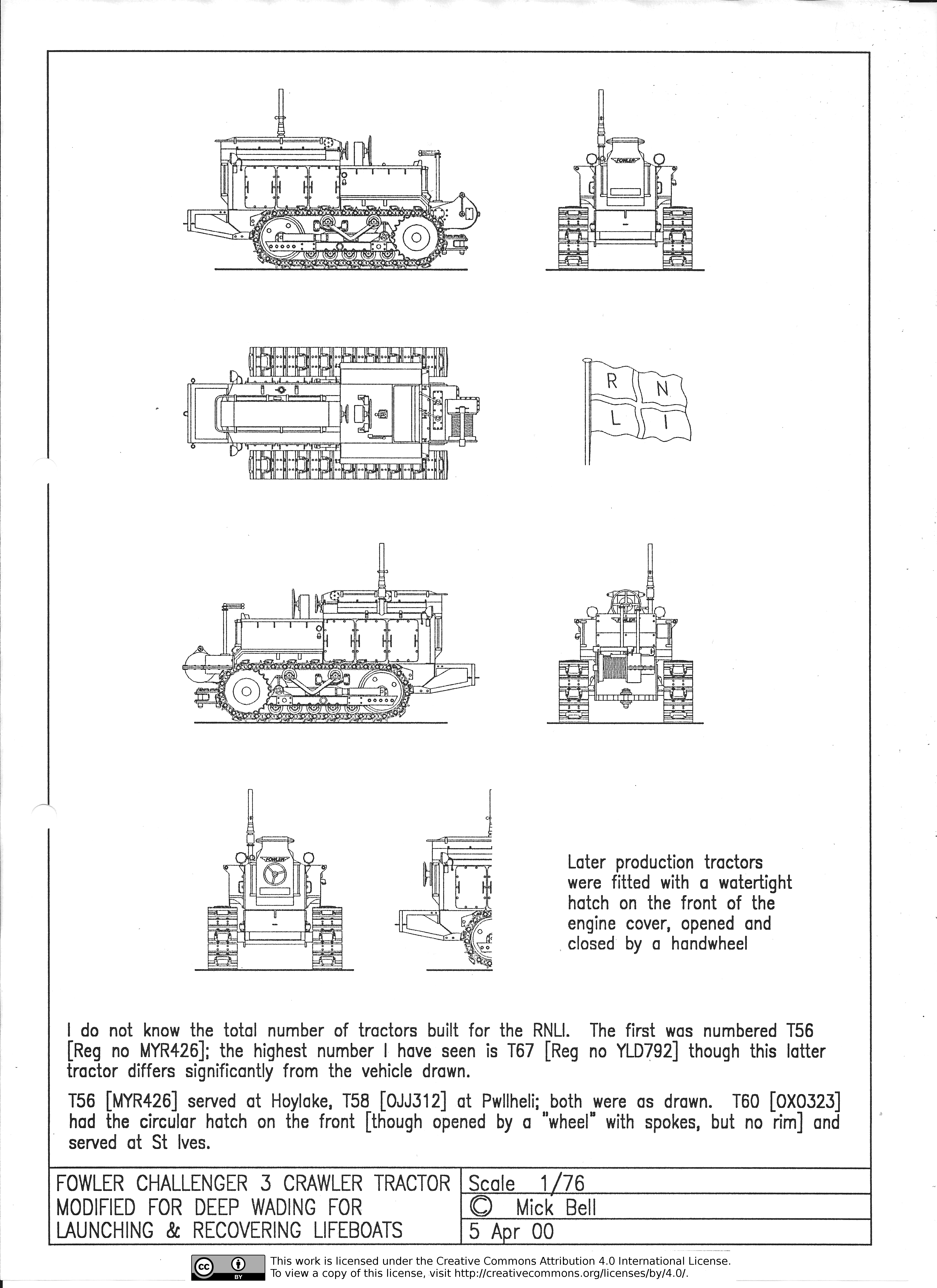
RNLI Fowler Challenger III Crawler Tractor (Mick Bell)

A prototype was trialled successfully at Aberystwyth in 1952.

The tractor developed a draw-bar pull of 21,100 Lbs, through its six-speed gearbox, and was fitted with a specially designed winch, allowing it to exert a maximum pull of 38,500 Lbs. at its lowest speed. Extended gear and clutch levers were fitted, to assist the driver when submerged.

The tractor had been made completely watertight, with the engine compartment sealed with watertight panels and doors. The engine was designed to run for long periods without overheating. Circular brass rubber-seated valves were fitted to the air intake and discharge ports, to be closed when submerged. To prevent damage, an automatic stop device was also employed.

There were many requirements of the RNLI variant tractor:

- Able to tow a life-boat and carriage weighing up to 14 tons over various types of terrain, including soft sand and deep shingle.
- Able to pull the life-boat and carriage up gradients of 1 in 4 and to hold them by its brakes on these gradients.
- Able to haul life-boat and carriage to the water, which at low water may be several miles at some stations.
- Capable of operating continuously at full power, in water up to a depth of seven feet.

== RNLI Fowler Challenger III fleet ==
Op.No. (Note: Op.No. is the RNLI's Operational Number carried on the hull.)	Reg No.	Built	In service	Station	Image	Comments
T56	MYR 426	1953	1953–1960	Hoylake		Featured in Meccano Magazine, April 1954. In private ownership in Cork, Ireland.
T56	MYR 426	1953	1960–1962	Relief fleet		Featured in Meccano Magazine, April 1954. In private ownership in Cork, Ireland.
T56	MYR 426	1953	1962–1967	St Ives		Featured in Meccano Magazine, April 1954. In private ownership in Cork, Ireland.
T56	MYR 426	1953	1967	Depot		Featured in Meccano Magazine, April 1954. In private ownership in Cork, Ireland.
T56	MYR 426	1953	1968	Dungeness		Featured in Meccano Magazine, April 1954. In private ownership in Cork, Ireland.
T56	MYR 426	1953	1968–1969	Depot		Featured in Meccano Magazine, April 1954. In private ownership in Cork, Ireland.
T56	MYR 426	1953	1969–1977	Llandudno		Featured in Meccano Magazine, April 1954. In private ownership in Cork, Ireland.
T56	MYR 426	1953	1977–1982	Relief fleet		Featured in Meccano Magazine, April 1954. In private ownership in Cork, Ireland.
T56	MYR 426	1953	1982	Hoylake		Featured in Meccano Magazine, April 1954. In private ownership in Cork, Ireland.
T56	MYR 426	1953	1982–1988	Clogherhead		Featured in Meccano Magazine, April 1954. In private ownership in Cork, Ireland.
T56	MYR 426	1953	1988–1989	Stored (Arklow)		Featured in Meccano Magazine, April 1954. In private ownership in Cork, Ireland.
T57	NYE 351	1953	1953–1964	Aberystwyth		For many years in the Tim Matthews collection at Tring, Hertfordshire, but sold in Cheffins auction in May 2026, and now in private ownership in Surrey.
T57	NYE 351	1953	1964–1966	Relief fleet		For many years in the Tim Matthews collection at Tring, Hertfordshire, but sold in Cheffins auction in May 2026, and now in private ownership in Surrey.
T57	NYE 351	1953	1966–1968	Boulmer		For many years in the Tim Matthews collection at Tring, Hertfordshire, but sold in Cheffins auction in May 2026, and now in private ownership in Surrey.
T57	NYE 351	1953	1968–1970	Dungeness		For many years in the Tim Matthews collection at Tring, Hertfordshire, but sold in Cheffins auction in May 2026, and now in private ownership in Surrey.
T57	NYE 351	1953	1970–1972	Hastings		For many years in the Tim Matthews collection at Tring, Hertfordshire, but sold in Cheffins auction in May 2026, and now in private ownership in Surrey.
T57	NYE 351	1953	1972–1974	Relief fleet		For many years in the Tim Matthews collection at Tring, Hertfordshire, but sold in Cheffins auction in May 2026, and now in private ownership in Surrey.
T57	NYE 351	1953	1974	Rhyl		For many years in the Tim Matthews collection at Tring, Hertfordshire, but sold in Cheffins auction in May 2026, and now in private ownership in Surrey.
T57	NYE 351	1953	1974–1976	Runswick		For many years in the Tim Matthews collection at Tring, Hertfordshire, but sold in Cheffins auction in May 2026, and now in private ownership in Surrey.
T57	NYE 351	1953	1976–1978	Depot		For many years in the Tim Matthews collection at Tring, Hertfordshire, but sold in Cheffins auction in May 2026, and now in private ownership in Surrey.
T57	NYE 351	1953	1978–1983	Clogherhead		For many years in the Tim Matthews collection at Tring, Hertfordshire, but sold in Cheffins auction in May 2026, and now in private ownership in Surrey.
T57	NYE 351	1953	1983–1985	Depot		For many years in the Tim Matthews collection at Tring, Hertfordshire, but sold in Cheffins auction in May 2026, and now in private ownership in Surrey.
T58	OJJ 312	1953	1953–1965	Pwllheli		Location unknown.
T58	OJJ 312	1953	1965–1974	Bridlington		Location unknown.
T58	OJJ 312	1953	1974–1975	Rhyl		Location unknown.
T58	OJJ 312	1953	1975–1976	Depot		Location unknown.
T58	HZR 780	1953	1976–1989	Kilmore Quay		Location unknown.
T59	OJJ 866	1954	1954–1969	Wells-next-the-Sea		Location unknown.
T59	OJJ 866	1954	1969–1971	Depot		Location unknown.
T59	OJJ 866	1954	1971–1976	Kilmore Quay		Location unknown.
T59	OJJ 866	1954	1977–1985	Newcastle		Location unknown.
T60	OXO 323	1954	1954–1962	St Ives		Location unknown.
T60	OXO 323	1954	1963–1972	Rhyl		Location unknown.
T60	OXO 323	1954	1972–1973	Depot		Location unknown.
T60	OXO 323	1954	1973–1974	Hastings		Location unknown.
T60	OXO 323	1954	1974–1978	Bridlington		Location unknown.
T60	OXO 323	1954	1978–1983	Rhyl		Location unknown.
T60	OXO 323	1954	1983–1985	Wells-next-the-Sea		Location unknown.
T60	OXO 323	1954	1985–1989	Relief fleet		Location unknown.
T61	PLA 561	1954	1954–1966	Boulmer		Restored, was offered for sale in 2022. In a private collection in Market Rasen, Lincolnshire.
T61	PLA 561	1954	1966–1967	Relief fleet		Restored, was offered for sale in 2022. In a private collection in Market Rasen, Lincolnshire.
T61	PLA 561	1954	1967–1968	St Ives		Restored, was offered for sale in 2022. In a private collection in Market Rasen, Lincolnshire.
T61	PLA 561	1954	1968–1969	Relief fleet		Restored, was offered for sale in 2022. In a private collection in Market Rasen, Lincolnshire.
T61	PLA 561	1954	1969–1975	Hoylake		Restored, was offered for sale in 2022. In a private collection in Market Rasen, Lincolnshire.
T61	PLA 561	1954	1975–1984	Scarborough		Restored, was offered for sale in 2022. In a private collection in Market Rasen, Lincolnshire.
T61	PLA 561	1954	1985–1988	Newcastle		Restored, was offered for sale in 2022. In a private collection in Market Rasen, Lincolnshire.
T61	PLA 561	1954	1988–1989	Relief fleet		Restored, was offered for sale in 2022. In a private collection in Market Rasen, Lincolnshire.
T62	PLA 698	1954	1954–1965	Bridlington		On display in the Stephen Robson Collection at Chain Bridge Honey Farm, Berwick-upon-Tweed, Northumberland.
T62	PLA 698	1954	1965–1967	Relief fleet		On display in the Stephen Robson Collection at Chain Bridge Honey Farm, Berwick-upon-Tweed, Northumberland.
T62	PLA 698	1954	1967–1976	Scarborough		On display in the Stephen Robson Collection at Chain Bridge Honey Farm, Berwick-upon-Tweed, Northumberland.
T62	PLA 698	1954	1976–1978	Runswick		On display in the Stephen Robson Collection at Chain Bridge Honey Farm, Berwick-upon-Tweed, Northumberland.
T62	PLA 698	1954	1978–1980	Sheringham		On display in the Stephen Robson Collection at Chain Bridge Honey Farm, Berwick-upon-Tweed, Northumberland.
T62	PLA 698	1954	1980–1981	Relief fleet		On display in the Stephen Robson Collection at Chain Bridge Honey Farm, Berwick-upon-Tweed, Northumberland.
T62	PLA 698	1954	1981–1987	Ilfracombe		On display in the Stephen Robson Collection at Chain Bridge Honey Farm, Berwick-upon-Tweed, Northumberland.
T62	PLA 698	1954	1987–1989	Depot		On display in the Stephen Robson Collection at Chain Bridge Honey Farm, Berwick-upon-Tweed, Northumberland.
T63	PXF 163	1954	1955–1963	Rhyl		In the John Myers Historic Vehicle Collection at Huddersfield, West Yorkshire.
T63	PXF 163	1954	1963–1965	Relief fleet		In the John Myers Historic Vehicle Collection at Huddersfield, West Yorkshire.
T63	PXF 163	1954	1965–1975	Pwllheli		In the John Myers Historic Vehicle Collection at Huddersfield, West Yorkshire.
T63	PXF 163	1954	1975–1978	Hoylake		In the John Myers Historic Vehicle Collection at Huddersfield, West Yorkshire.
T63	PXF 163	1954	1979–1983	Wells-next-the-Sea		In the John Myers Historic Vehicle Collection at Huddersfield, West Yorkshire.
T63	PXF 163	1954	1984–1988	Scarborough		In the John Myers Historic Vehicle Collection at Huddersfield, West Yorkshire.
T63	PXF 163	1954	1988	Depot		In the John Myers Historic Vehicle Collection at Huddersfield, West Yorkshire.
T64	PXF 575	1955	1955–1958	Gourdon		In the John Myers Historic Vehicle Collection at Huddersfield, West Yorkshire.
T64	PXF 575	1955	1958–1967	Scarborough		In the John Myers Historic Vehicle Collection at Huddersfield, West Yorkshire.
T64	PXF 575	1955	1968–1978	Sheringham		In the John Myers Historic Vehicle Collection at Huddersfield, West Yorkshire.
T64	PXF 575	1955	1978–1980	Relief fleet		In the John Myers Historic Vehicle Collection at Huddersfield, West Yorkshire.
T64	PXF 575	1955	1980–1982	Sheringham		In the John Myers Historic Vehicle Collection at Huddersfield, West Yorkshire.
T64	PXF 575	1955	1982–1984	Relief fleet		In the John Myers Historic Vehicle Collection at Huddersfield, West Yorkshire.
T64	PXF 575	1955	1984–1986	Sheringham		In the John Myers Historic Vehicle Collection at Huddersfield, West Yorkshire.
T65	VYT 878	1958	1958–1959	Gourdon		On display in the RNLI Heritage Collection at Chatham Historic Dockyard.
T65	VYT 878	1958	1959–1963	Relief fleet		On display in the RNLI Heritage Collection at Chatham Historic Dockyard.
T65	VYT 878	1958	1963–1970	Hastings		On display in the RNLI Heritage Collection at Chatham Historic Dockyard.
T65	VYT 878	1958	1970	Dungeness		On display in the RNLI Heritage Collection at Chatham Historic Dockyard.
T65	VYT 878	1958	1970–1972	Relief fleet		On display in the RNLI Heritage Collection at Chatham Historic Dockyard.
T65	VYT 878	1958	1972–1973	Hastings		On display in the RNLI Heritage Collection at Chatham Historic Dockyard.
T65	VYT 878	1958	1974–1985	Hastings		On display in the RNLI Heritage Collection at Chatham Historic Dockyard.
T65	VYT 878	1958	1985–1990	Relief fleet		On display in the RNLI Heritage Collection at Chatham Historic Dockyard.
T66	XYP 400	1959	1959–1969	Gourdon		In a private collection in Ravensden, Bedfordshire.
T66	XYP 400	1959	1969–1974	Runswick		In a private collection in Ravensden, Bedfordshire.
T66	XYP 400	1959	1975	Aldeburgh		In a private collection in Ravensden, Bedfordshire.
T66	XYP 400	1959	1976–1986	Pwllheli		In a private collection in Ravensden, Bedfordshire.
T66	XYP 400	1959	1986–1989	Depot		In a private collection in Ravensden, Bedfordshire.
T67	YLD 792	1960	1960–1969	Hoylake		In a private collection in Redditch, Worcestershire, November 2024.
T67	YLD 792	1960	1969–1972	Relief fleet		In a private collection in Redditch, Worcestershire, November 2024.
T67	YLD 792	1960	1972–1974	Rhyl		In a private collection in Redditch, Worcestershire, November 2024.
T67	YLD 792	1960	1974–1979	Wells-next-the-Sea		In a private collection in Redditch, Worcestershire, November 2024.
T67	YLD 792	1960	1979–1982	Relief fleet		In a private collection in Redditch, Worcestershire, November 2024.
T67	YLD 792	1960	1982–1983	Hoylake		In a private collection in Redditch, Worcestershire, November 2024.
T67	YLD 792	1960	1983–1984	Rhyl		In a private collection in Redditch, Worcestershire, November 2024.
T67	YLD 792	1960	1984–1985	Relief fleet		In a private collection in Redditch, Worcestershire, November 2024.
T67	YLD 792	1960	1985–1987	Aldeburgh		In a private collection in Redditch, Worcestershire, November 2024.
T67	YLD 792	1960	1987–1989	Depot		In a private collection in Redditch, Worcestershire, November 2024.
T68	YUV 742	1960	1960–1968	Sheringham		For many years in the Tim Matthews collection at Tring, Hertfordshire, but sold in Cheffins auction in May 2026, and now in private ownership in Exmouth.
T68	YUV 742	1960	1969–1974	Wells-next-the-Sea		For many years in the Tim Matthews collection at Tring, Hertfordshire, but sold in Cheffins auction in May 2026, and now in private ownership in Exmouth.
T68	YUV 742	1960	1975–1978	Rhyl		For many years in the Tim Matthews collection at Tring, Hertfordshire, but sold in Cheffins auction in May 2026, and now in private ownership in Exmouth.
T68	YUV 742	1960	1978–1982	Hoylake		For many years in the Tim Matthews collection at Tring, Hertfordshire, but sold in Cheffins auction in May 2026, and now in private ownership in Exmouth.
T68	YUV 742	1960	1982–1984	Sheringham		For many years in the Tim Matthews collection at Tring, Hertfordshire, but sold in Cheffins auction in May 2026, and now in private ownership in Exmouth.
T68	YUV 742	1960	1984–1987	Relief fleet		For many years in the Tim Matthews collection at Tring, Hertfordshire, but sold in Cheffins auction in May 2026, and now in private ownership in Exmouth.
T68	YUV 742	1960	1987	Pwllheli		For many years in the Tim Matthews collection at Tring, Hertfordshire, but sold in Cheffins auction in May 2026, and now in private ownership in Exmouth.
T68	YUV 742	1960	1987–1989	Relief fleet		For many years in the Tim Matthews collection at Tring, Hertfordshire, but sold in Cheffins auction in May 2026, and now in private ownership in Exmouth.

== See also ==
- Four Wheel Drive RNLI tractor
- RNLI Case 1000D launch tractor
- Talus MB-H launch tractor
- Talus MB-4H launch tractor
- Talus MB-764 launch tractor
- Talus Atlantic 85 DO-DO launch carriage
- New Holland TC45 launch tractor
