= Hayle Lifeboat Station =

- Flag of the RNLI

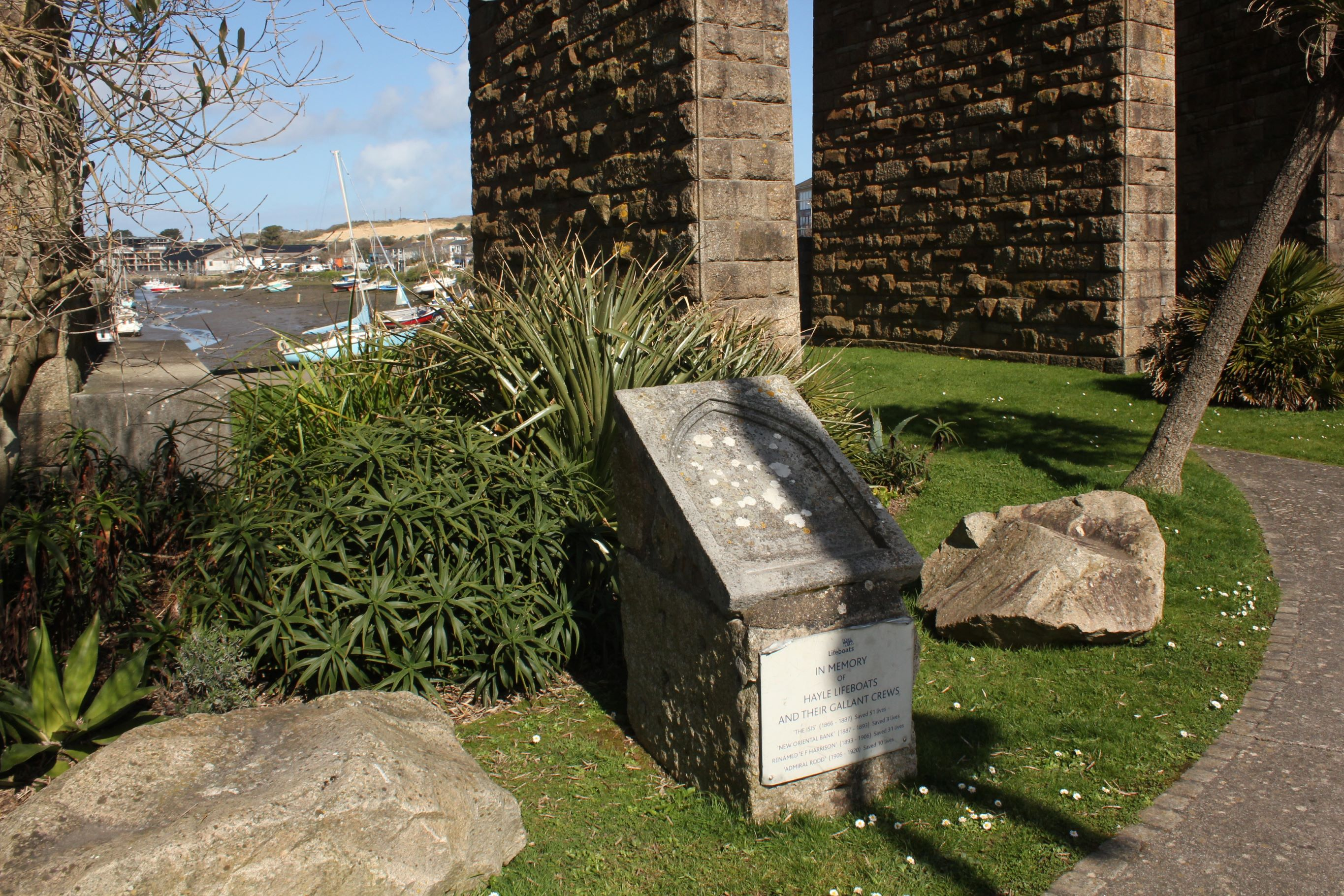
- Hayle Lifeboat Memorial

- Map of Cornwall showing Hayle

General information
- Type: Lifeboat station
- Location: Hayle, England
- Coordinates: 50.1898°N 5.4242°W
- Opened: 1866
- Closed: 1920
- Owner: RNLI

Hayle Lifeboat Station was the base for a Royal National Lifeboat Institution (RNLI) lifeboat at Hayle in Cornwall, England, United Kingdom. It was in use from 1866 until 1920.

== History ==
Hayle is a small town situated on a tidal inlet on the north coast of Cornwall. It developed as an important industrial base that supported the local mining industry. New wharves were built in the early part of the 19th century and the Hayle and Bristol Steam Packet Company started regular services in 1831. A narrow entrance to the harbour results in strong tidal flows, and navigation is made more difficult by a bar of sand that creates shifting, shallow water offshore. The nearest lifeboat was at St Ives but the lifeboat from Penzance on the south coast was sometimes brought overland to launch at Hayle. Two ships were wrecked on the Hayle Bar in 1865 and so the RNLI built a lifeboat station on the quay which opened in the spring of 1866.

A new boathouse was built in 1897. The mining industry and therefore trade at Hayle was in decline at this time and the lifeboat station closed in 1920. The boathouse was later rebuilt as a store for Hayle Power Station. It was demolished in the 1980s.

== Lifeboat memorial ==
The first lifeboat is commemorated in the Isis Gardens which were opened in 1995 on the site of the first Hayle railway station in Foundry Square.

== Hayle lifeboats ==
Three different lifeboats were stationed at Hayle, all of the 'pulling and sailing' type. These were equipped with oars but could use sails when conditions allowed.

The first was funded by students at the University of Oxford. It was named Isis and was exhibited on the River Isis in Oxford on 24 April 1866 during its journey from its builders in London to Hayle. It was replaced in 1888 by a new boat paid for by staff of the New Oriental Bank Corporation in memory of Edward Harrison. It was initially named after the bank but this was later changed to E.F. Harrison. The final lifeboat was the Admiral Rodd which was built in 1906.

At Hayle	Name	ON	Length	Class	Comments
1866–1888	Isis	—	32 ft (9.8 m)	Self-Righter	
1888–1892	New Oriental Bank	161	34 ft (10 m)	Self-Righter	Renamed 1892.
1892–1906	E.F. Harrison	161	34 ft (10 m)	Self-Righter	Renamed 1892.
1906–1920	Admiral Rodd	567	36 ft (11 m)	Self-Righter	Transferred into the RNLI Reserve Fleet until sold in 1922.

== See also ==
- List of former RNLI stations
- Royal National Lifeboat Institution lifeboats
