= St Ives Lifeboat Station =

RNLI lifeboat station in Cornwall, England

- Flag of the RNLI

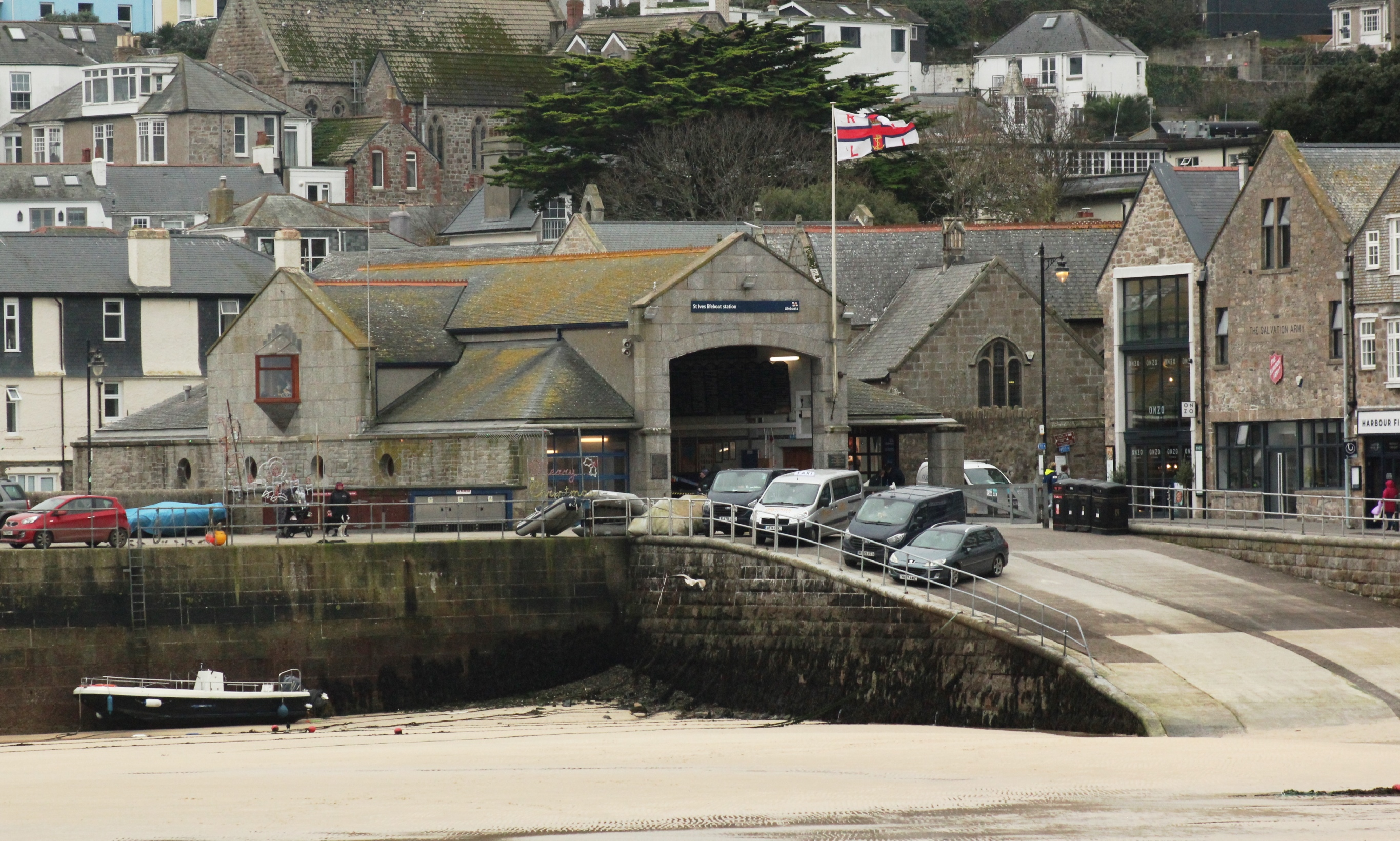
- St Ives lifeboat station and slipway in 2024

- Location within Cornwall

General information
- Type: Lifeboat station
- Location: Wharf Road, St Ives, Cornwall, TR26 1LF, United Kingdom
- Coordinates: 50.2128°N 5.4795°W
- Opened: First boat 1840; Present building 1994
- Owner: Royal National Lifeboat Institution

Design and construction
- Architect: Poynton Bradbury Associates

Website
- rnli.org/find-my-nearest/lifeboat-stations/st-ives-lifeboat-station

St Ives Lifeboat Station is a Royal National Lifeboat Institution (RNLI) station in St Ives, a seaside resort on the north-west coast of Cornwall, England. It is at the foot of Lifeboat Hill, next to West Pier.

The first lifeboat was built for the town in 1840. A new station with a new lifeboat was established by the RNLI in 1861.

The station currently operates a Shannon-class all-weather lifeboat (ALB), 13-11 Nora Stachura (ON 1318), on station since 2015, and the smaller D-class (IB1) inshore lifeboat (ILB), Donald Dean (D-803), on station since 2016.

== History ==
St Ives is an historic fishing port in west Cornwall and offers a sheltered harbour for ships in the open waters of the Western Approaches.

On 24 December 1838, the schooner Rival was trying to enter the harbour in a gale, but came to grief on one of its piers. Despite the lack of proper rescue boats and equipment, after much courage and effort by the people ashore, five people were saved. Five pilots ware awarded the RNIPLS Silver Medal.

A meeting was held and it was decided that a proper lifeboat should be built for the town. Local man Francis Adams had recently won a prize from the Royal Cornwall Polytechnic Society, for designing a double-ended, self-righting lifeboat, and he was commissioned to now build one. The Hope entered service in 1840, assisting the Mary Ann of Poole during a storm on 7 April. In 1848 it was reported that the boat was kept in a shed 400 yards from high water mark and was in the charge of Mr Hockin. There is no record of the services rendered by this boat.

By 1860, maybe much earlier, Hope had fallen out of service. The letters of three representatives for St Ives; Mr James Young, Henry Paull, MP, and Lt. Pearson, RN, chief officer of HM Coastguard, requesting that a new lifeboat be stationed at St Ives, and pledging their support, were received by the RNLI, and read at a meeting of the committee of management on Thursday 5 April 1860. With the supporting letter of the Inspector of Lifeboats following his visit to the town, the request was agreed.

Wrecks have frequently happened at St. Ives; and standing as it does at the south entrance of the Bristol Channel, and near the extremity of the peninsula of Cornwall, it is important that the passing trade should be protected by a life-boat there.

A 30 ft (9.1 m) Peake-class self-righting 'Pulling and Sailing' (P&S) lifeboat, one with sails and (10) oars, and costing £157, was placed on service in July 1861. In accordance with the anonymous donor's wishes, the new lifeboat was named Moses. A substantial boathouse was constructed at Porthgwidden near St Ives Head, at the top of Island Road (50°13′00.4″N 5°28′40.1″W), at a cost of £142.

Porthgwidden beach should have been an ideal location for launching the lifeboat, but it quickly proved more difficult than expected. It proved equally difficult to negotiate the lifeboat through the narrow lanes of St Ives, such as Fish Street, to take the lifeboat to launch from the harbour. The Porthgwidden boathouse (still standing today as a workshop) was abandoned, with the boat kept on the beach outside the Old Customs House.

On 28 October 1865, the lifeboat was launched to the aid of the French brig Providence, which was wrecked on Hayle bar, whilst on passage to Saint-Malo from Cardiff. During the service, the lifeboat capsized twice, but still continued on to rescue four of the five crew. Gold and silver medals were awarded to the coxswain and crew by Napoleon III, Emperor of France, with coxswain Nicholas Levett also receiving the RNLI Silver Medal. This event also prompted the establishment of Hayle Lifeboat Station in 1866.

In 1866, with the crew expressing a need for a larger boat, a 32 ft (9.8 m) lifeboat with carriage was placed at St Ives, the boat again taking the name Moses. The following year, a replacement boathouse was constructed on Fore Street, at a cost of £190.

The 1867 boathouse may have been located on Fore Street, but Wharf Road didn't exist at the time, and the boat could be launched straight to the sea. In 1893/94, West Pier was constructed, and Wharf Road was built along the waters edge, behind all the seaward buildings of Fore Street. Now to launch the lifeboat, it had to be removed from the boathouse, turned 90 degrees, and hauled a short way along Wharf Road, where a slipway had been constructed. A new boathouse in 1911 on the same site replaced the 1867 boathouse, but further works to widen Wharf Street after World War I resulted in the loss of the slipway. From that time, until the creation of a new boathouse and slipway in 1994, the lifeboat would have to be hauled half way along Wharf Road, to the large slipway at the junction with Back Lane. A Case L launch tractor (T35) was only placed at St Ives on the arrival of a new boat in 1940.

=== Motor power ===
After the lifeboat station at Hayle was closed in 1920, the St Ives boat would now cover a larger area, but this was made easier in 1933 with the arrival of a first motor lifeboat, 24 years after motor-powered lifeboats were first deployed by the RNLI. The boat was the Caroline Parsons (ON 763), costing £3,213, and was essentially a 35-foot 6in self-righting P&S lifeboat, retaining sails and oars, but fitted with a single 35-hp Weyburn AE6 petrol engine.

On 31 January 1938, the Caroline Parsons went out in aid of the SS Alba. 23 people were rescued, but as the lifeboat turned to head home, it was capsized by a large wave. The lifeboat self-righted, but ran aground on the rocks. The lifeboat coxswain and his eight crewmen got ashore safely but five of the rescued men were lost. Coxswain Thomas Cocking was awarded the RNLI Silver Medal, with the rest of the crew, including Thomas' two sons John and Thomas Jr., awarded bronze medals. The Caroline Parsons was withdrawn from service, and soon replaced with another 35-foot 6in self-righting motor-powered lifeboat, John and Sarah Eliza Stych (ON 743).

=== Disaster ===
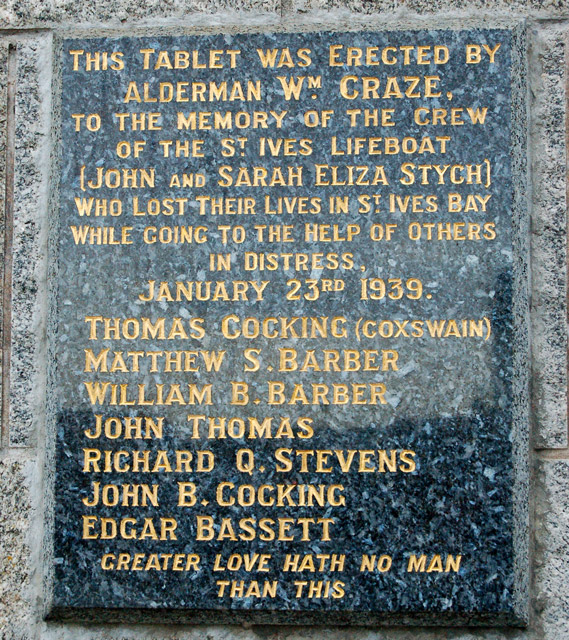
Memorial

In the early hours of 23 January 1939, in a force 10 storm with gusts of wind at 100 mph (160 km/h), a large steamship was reported to be in trouble off Cape Cornwall. Due to the state of the low tide, the Sennen Cove lifeboat could not be launched. At 03:00, the John and Sarah Eliza Stych was launched from St Ives into the dark. On board was coxswain Thomas Cocking Sr., his son John Cocking, along with Matthew Barber, William Barber and John Thomas, all of which had been in the Caroline Parsons wreck. The three other crew members were Edgar Bassett, Richard Stevens, and William Freeman, but this time, Thomas Cocking Jr. was not on the crew.

AS the lifeboat rounded the St Ives peninsula known as The Island, it met the full force of the storm as it headed westwards. Off Clodgy Point, the boat capsized but self-righted. Of the five men thrown in the water, just William Freeman regained the boat. The engine was restarted, but with a fouled propeller, they drifted back towards The Island. There the anchor was dropped, but the rope parted and the lifeboat capsized and righted a second time. Now with just three crew aboard, the boat now drifted north-eastwards across St Ives Bay towards Godrevy Point, where it capsized for a third time. When it righted, only Freeman was left. He scrambled ashore when the boat was smashed on the rocks.

Eight Bronze medals for gallantry were awarded, seven posthumously. Pensions were granted by the Institution to widows and dependents. The station was closed temporarily, until a new Liverpool-class lifeboat Caroline Oates Aver and William Maine (ON 831) arrived on station in 1940. Thomas Cocking Jr. would in turn become Thomas Cocking Sr., and command the lifeboat in the 1970s and 1980s, twice receiving the RNLI silver medal. In 1985, a memorial plaque in stone, formerly placed in the local cemetery, was removed and restored, and re-sited on the external wall of the St Ives lifeboat house.

=== 1960s onwards ===
In 1962, the number of rescues or attempted rescues by all-weather lifeboats in the summer months was 98, with the number of lives rescued being 133. In 1963, in response to an increasing amount of water-based leisure activity, the RNLI began trials of small fast inshore lifeboats, placed at various locations around the country. These were easily launched with just a few people, ideal to respond quickly to local emergencies. This quickly proved to be very successful. In 1963, there were 226 rescues or attempted rescues in the summer months, as a result of which 225 lives were saved.

One of the first places to trial one of the new inshore lifeboats was St Ives, with a D-class inshore lifeboat placed on temporary duty in connection with the St Ives Live-Saving Association. The inshore lifeboat was made a permanent addition to the station in April 1964, and was kept in a building in the Sloop Car Park on West Hill.

In 1990, the new St Ives lifeboat arrived, a Mersey-class all-weather lifeboat 12-009 The Princess Royal (Civil Service No. 41) (ON 1167), costing £445,432, funded by contributions from civil servants and employees of the Post Office and British Telecom, via the Civil Service, Post Office and British Telecom Lifeboat Fund (CISPOTEL). The boat, with its carriage and Talus MB-H amphibious tractor, was too large to fit in the existing boathouse, and so work commenced to plan and build a whole new station and slipway, yards away from the existing station. Building works started on 4 October 1993, and was completed on 27 May 1994. As well as providing a boat-hall large enough for the Mersey-class lifeboat and tractor, along with up-to-date crew facilities, office, workshop, and a souvenir outlet, accommodation was also provided for the inshore lifeboat.

The building, projected cost £1.3 million, was funded primarily from a specific bequest from Mrs Eugenie Boucher, a native of Penza in south-east Russia, who left £3.5 million for the provision of boathouses. The eight new or refurbished boathouses are known as "Penza" boathouses within the RNLI.

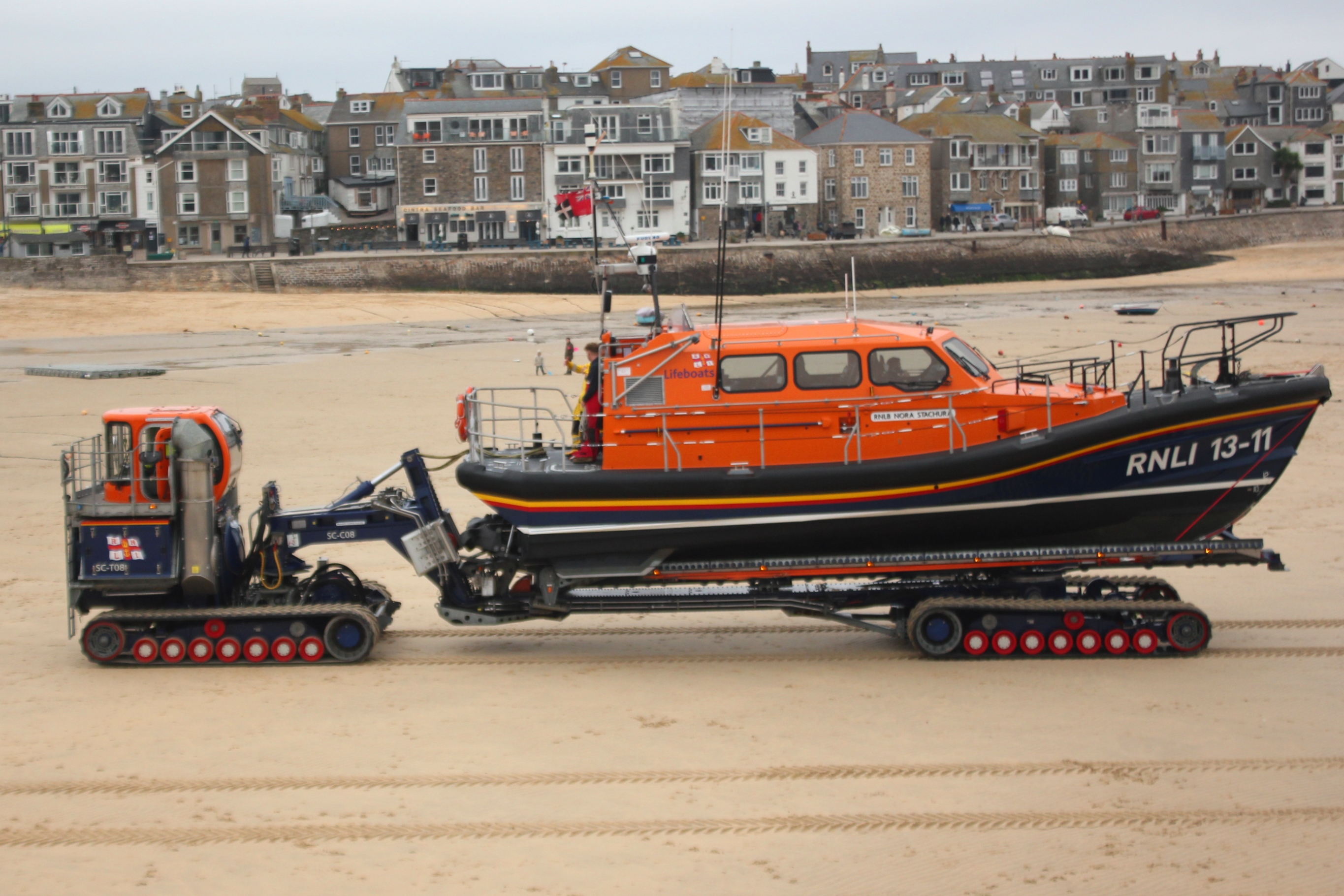
Shannon-class lifeboat, 13-11 Nora Stachura (ON 1318) with SLARS launch vehicle

Further work was carried out in 2015, including widening the main doorway, ready for the arrival of a new Shannon-class all-weather lifeboat, 13-11 Nora Stachura (ON 1318), and its SLARS launch vehicle.

The new lifeboat was primarily funded from the legacy of Nora Stachura of Swindon, and was formally named at a ceremony on 15 May 2026. The SLARS unit was funded from the legacy of Kenneth George Fulford, and was named in his honour.

Also in 2016, the station saw the arrival of its latest D-class (IB1) inshore lifeboat, Donald Dean (D-803). Doctor Donald Dean (1927–2013) spent a career in medicine, although working for BP and later for the UK Chamber of Shipping. After his death, his legacy established the Donald Dean Foundation, which is used for charitable purposes.

In 2025, the 10-year-old SLARS launch vehicle (SC-T08) was sent for a planned refit, with a new unit (SC-T28) sent to the station. In an operation during the high spring tide on 15 February, the two launch vehicles were swapped by sea, with the aid of a landing craft.

== Description ==
The lifeboat house is situated at the landward end of West Pier facing a slipway into the harbour. Both boats are kept inside on carriages and launched with the aid of tractors. The building is built in local granite to blend in with its surroundings. A large central portion houses the ALB. It is flanked by two wings, that on the harbour side for the ILB, the one on the town side is used as a fund-raising gift shop.

== Area of operation ==
The Shannon-class lifeboat at St Ives has an operating range of 250 nmi (460 km) and a top speed of 27 knots (31 mph; 50 km/h). Adjacent all-weather lifeboats are at Padstow to the east, and Sennen Cove to the west. There is also an inshore lifeboat to the east at St Agnes.

== Station honours ==
The following are awards made at St Ives:

=== Awards of the Institution ===
- RNIPLS Silver Medal
  Capt. James Berriman, master mariner, pilot – 1839
  Capt. Michael Welsh, master mariner, pilot – 1839
  Capt. Richard Paynter, master mariner, pilot – 1839
  Capt. Edward Richards, master mariner, pilot – 1839
  Capt. Thomas Richards, master mariner, pilot – 1839
- RNLI Silver Medal
  Paul Curnow, coxswain – 1871
  Charles Martin, chief officer, H.M. Coastguard, St Ives – 1873
  James Murphy, commissioned boatswain, H.M. Coastguard, St Ives – 1873
  James Murphy, second coxswain – 1880 (second-service clasp)
  Paul Curnow, coxswain – 1889 (second-service clasp)
  Thomas Stevens, coxswain – 1916
  Henry Escott, company quarter master sergeant, Royal Artillery Garrison – 1919
  Thomas Cocking Sr., coxswain – 1938
  William Peters, coxswain – 1946
  Michael Peters, motor mechanic – 1958
  Thomas Cocking Sr., coxswain – 1978
  Thomas Cocking Sr., coxswain – 1984 (second-service clasp)
- The Maud Smith award
  (for the bravest act of lifesaving during the year by a member of a lifeboat crew)
  Michael Peters, motor mechanic – 1958
  Thomas Cocking Sr., coxswain – 1984
- RNLI Bronze Medal
  William Peters, second coxswain – 1938
  John Bassett Cocking, asst. mechanic – 1938
  Matthew Stevens Barber, bowman – 1938
  John Thomas, signalman – 1938
  William Bryant Barber, crew member – 1938
  Thomas Cocking Jr., crew member – 1938
  Phillip Paynter, crew member – 1938
  Henry Peters, crew member – 1938
  Thomas Cocking Sr., coxswain – 1939 (post.)
  Matthew Stevens Barber, acting second coxswain – 1939 (second-service clasp) (post.)
  William Bryant Barber, acting bowman – 1939 (second-service clasp) (post.)
  Richard Quick Stevens, mechanic – 1939 (post.)
  John Bassett Cocking, asst, mechanic – 1939 (second-service clasp) (post.)
  John Thomas, signalman – 1939 (second-service clasp) (post.)
  Edgar Bassett, crew member – 1939 (post.)
  William Freeman, crew member – 1939
  Dan Roach, coxswain – 1958
  Dan Paynter Jr., signalman – 1958
  Eric Thomas Ward, helm – 1982
  Eric Thomas Ward, helm – 1982 (second-service clasp)
- The Thanks of the Institution inscribed on Vellum
  Robert Wedge, coxswain – 1921
  Thomas Cocking Sr., coxswain – 1975
  Thomas Cocking Sr., coxswain – 1977
  St Ives Lifeboat Crew – 1978
  William Thomas, crew member – 1982
  Philip Allen, crew member – 1982
  Thomas Cocking Jr., crew member – 1982
  John Stevens, crew member – 1982
- Framed letters of thanks signed by the chairman of the institution
  Helm and crew – 1968
  Thomas Cocking Sr., coxswain – 1972
  J. Tanner, tractor driver – 1980
  J. Benney, head launcher – 1980
  Philip Allen, helm – 1981
  Coxswain and crew of the St Ives lifeboat – 1989
- Letters of appreciation signed by the director of the institution
  Thomas Cocking, Sr, coxswain – 1980
  I. Lowe, helicopter crew – 1981
  I. Tanner, helicopter crew – 1981
  Commanding officer, RNAS Culdrose – 1981
- Special framed certificate (Fastnet Race)
  St Ives Lifeboat – 1979

=== Other awards ===
- Gold medal, awarded by the Emperor of France
  Nicholas Levett, coxswain – 1865
- Silver medal, awarded by the Emperor of France
  Each of the St Ives Lifeboat Crew – 1865
- Gold watch, awarded by the United States government
  Thomas Cocking, coxswain – 1936
- Monetary award, awarded by the United States government
  St Ives Lifeboat Crew – 1936
- Letter of thanks, from the Italian government
  St Ives Lifeboat Crew – 1936
- Gold Cross of Merit of the Republic of Hungary
  Thomas Cocking, coxswain – 1938
- Chevalier du Merite Maritime
  William Peters, coxswain – 1951
- Resuscitation Certificate, awarded by the Royal Humane Society
  Michael Peters, motor mechanic – 1958

== Roll of honour ==
In memory of those lost whilst serving at St Ives:

- Lost when the lifeboat John and Sarah Eliza Stych (ON 743) capsized three times, 23 January 1939
  Thomas Cocking Sr., coxswain (64)
  Matthew Stevens Barber, acting second coxswain (30)
  William Bryant Barber, acting bowman (37)
  Edgar Bassett, crew member (30)
  John Bassett Cocking, asst, mechanic (38)
  Richard Quick Stevens, mechanic (36)
  John Thomas, signalman (42)

== St Ives lifeboats ==
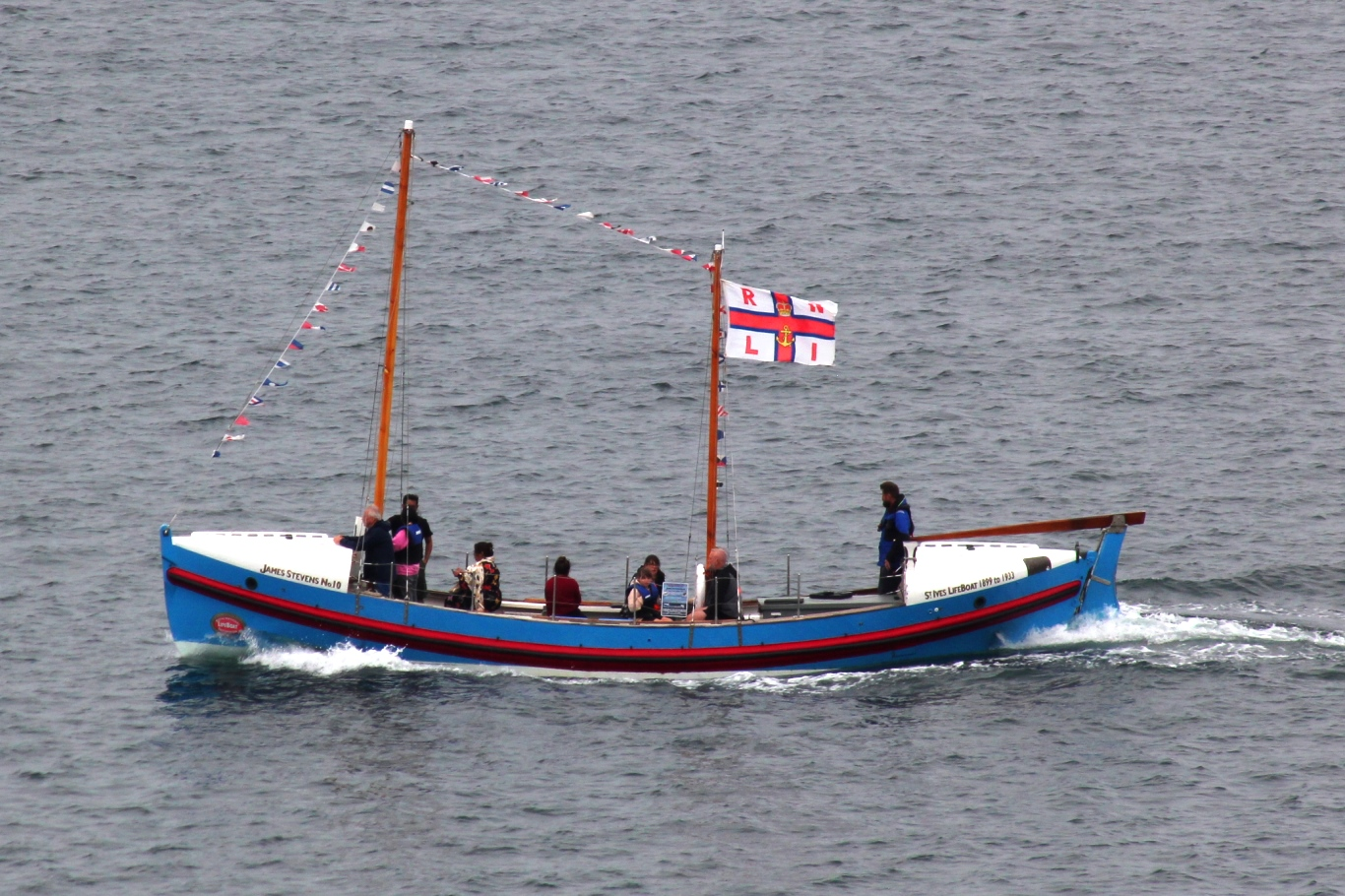
James Stevens No. 10 (1900–1933)

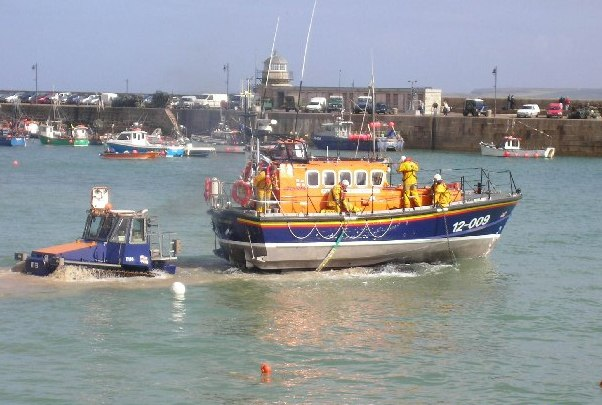
The Princess Royal (1990–2015)

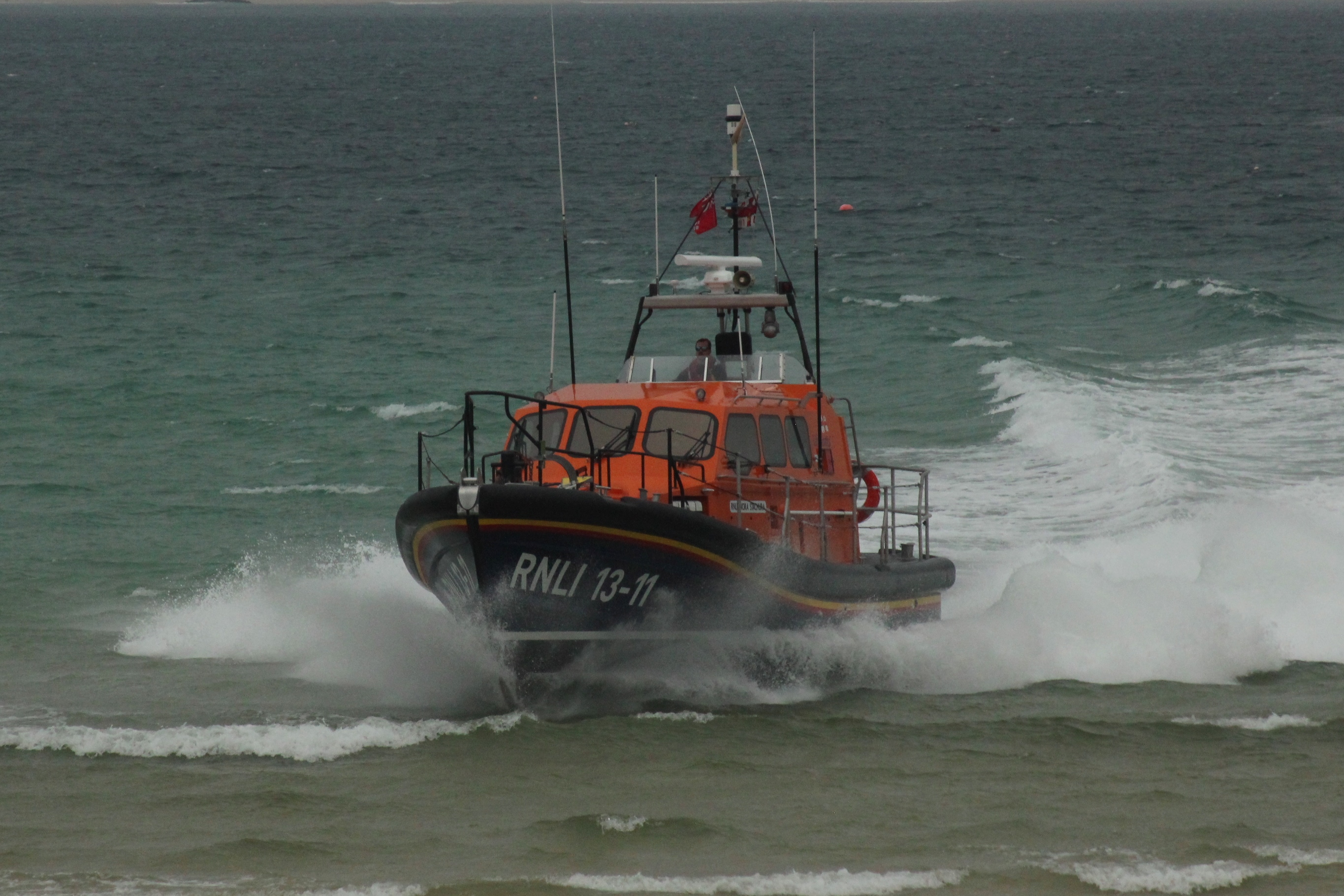
Nora Stachura (From 2015)

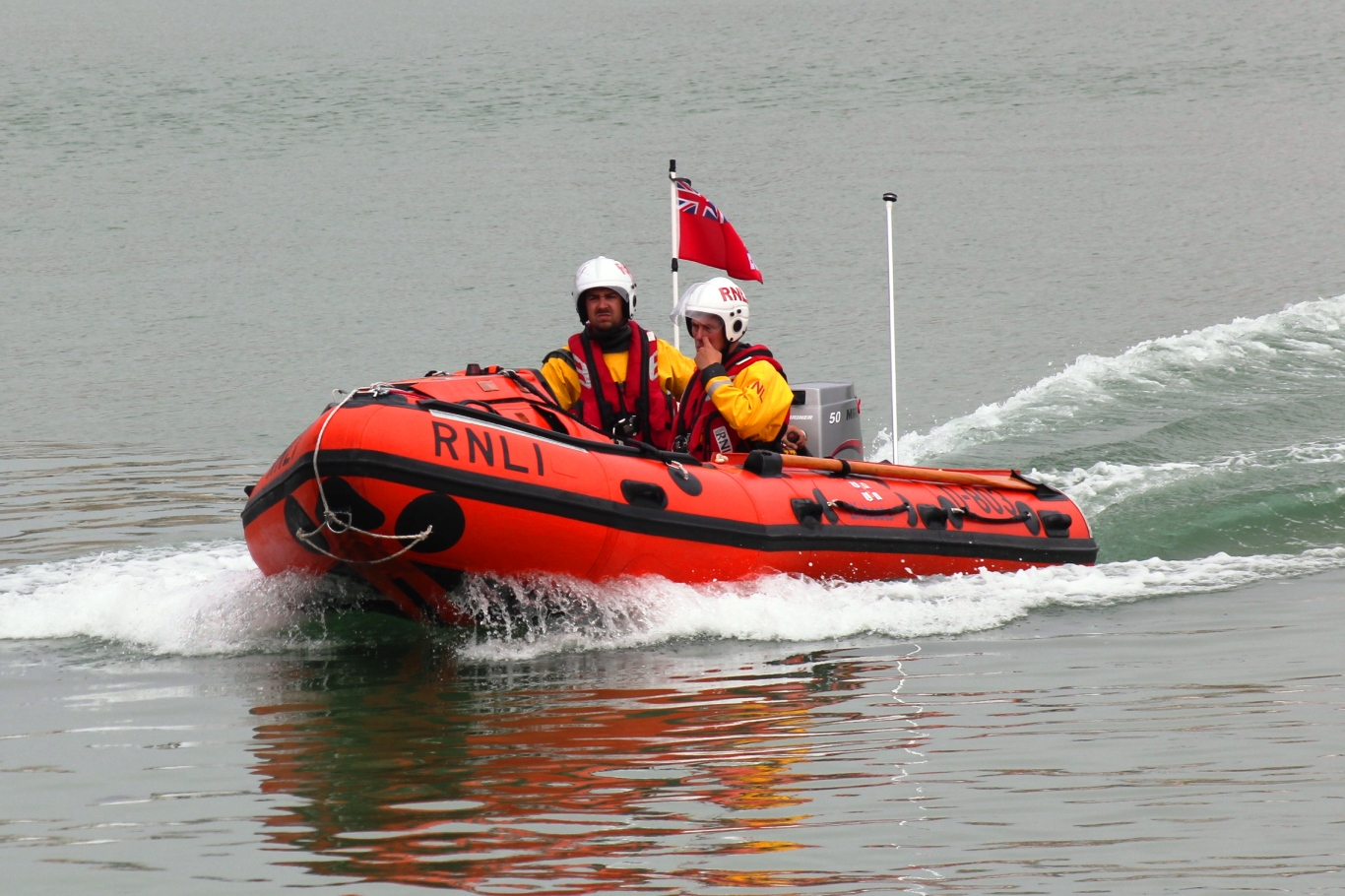
Donald Dean (From 2016)

=== Pulling and sailing (P&S) lifeboats ===
On station	ON (Note: ON is the RNLI's official number of the boat.)	Name	Built	Class	Comments
1840–1861	—	Hope	1840	30-foot Adams non-self-righting	(Note: 30 ft 0 in (9.14 m) x 5 ft 9 in (1.75 m) (8/12-oared) Adams-class self-righting (P&S) lifeboat, funded by local subscription, built by Francis Adams of St Ives, costing £120.); An 'unsinkable' lifeboat design by Francis Adams that won a competition held by the Royal Cornwall Polytechnic Society.
1861–1866	Pre-375	Moses	1860	30-foot Peake Self-righting (P&S)	(Note: 30 ft 0 in (9.14 m) x 7 ft 0 in (2.13 m) (10-oared) Peake-class self-righting (P&S) lifeboat, gift of an anonymous lady of Durham, built by Forrestt of Limehouse, London, costing £157.); Sold in 1866
1866–1870	Pre-468	Moses	1866	32-foot Prowse self-righting (P&S)	(Note: 32 ft 0 in (9.75 m) x 7 ft 7 in (2.31 m) (10-oared) Prowse-class self-righting (P&S) lifeboat, gift of an anonymous lady of Durham, built by Forrestt of Limehouse, London, costing £259.); Renamed Covent Garden in 1870.
1870–1878	Pre-468	Covent Garden	1866	32-foot Prowse self-righting (P&S)	(Note: Gift of the Covent Garden LB fund.); Renamed Exeter in 1878
1878–1886	Pre-468	Exeter	1866	32-foot Prowse self-righting (P&S)	(Note: Legacy of Mr W. Kendall of Exeter); Broken up in 1886.
1886-1899	50	Exeter	1886	34-foot self-righting (P&S)	(Note: 34 ft 0 in (10.36 m) x 7 ft 6 in (2.29 m) (10-oared) self-righting (P&S) lifeboat, legacy of Mr W. Kendall of Exeter, built by Woolfe of Shadwell, London, costing £297.); Broken up in 1900.
1900–1933	435	James Stevens No. 10	1899	37-foot self-righting (P&S)	(Note: 37 ft 0 in (11.28 m) x 9 ft 3 in (2.82 m) (12-oared) self-righting (P&S) lifeboat, legacy of Mr J. Stevens of Birmingham, built by Thames Ironworks of Blackwall, London, costing £834.); Sold 1933. Renamed Patricia Mary. Sunk in the Hayle Estuary on 30 December 2015. Now fully restored as James Stevens No. 10 at Scarborough, December 2024.

Pre ON numbers are unofficial numbers used by the Lifeboat Enthusiasts' Society to reference early lifeboats not included on the official RNLI list.

=== Motor and all-weather lifeboats ===
On station	ON	Op.No. (Note: Op.No. is the RNLI's operational number of the boat carried on the hull.)	Name	Built	Class	Comments
1933–1938	763	–	Caroline Parsons	1933	35-foot 6in self-righting (motor)	Wrecked on service, 31 January 1938.
1938–1939	743	–	John and Sarah Eliza Stych	1931	35-foot 6in self-righting (motor)	Previously at Padstow. Wrecked on service, 23 January 1939.
1940–1948	831	–	Caroline Oates Aver and William Maine	1939	Liverpool	Transferred to Ferryside.
1948–1968	861	–	Edgar George Orlando and Eva Child	1948	Liverpool	Transferred to the relief fleet, later at Blackpool.
1968–1989	992	37-21	Frank Penfold Marshall	1968	Oakley	Broken up at Southampton, December 1989.
1989–1989	984	37-17	Mary Joicey	1966	Oakley	First stationed at Newbiggin in 1966. Sold in 1989. Preserved at Newbiggin Maritime Centre, December 2025.
1989–1990	973	37-06	Fairlight	1964	Oakley	Previously at Hastings. Later at New Quay.
1990–2015	1167	12-009	The Princess Royal (Civil Service No. 41)	1990	Mersey	Sold in 2016. Renamed Ulidia with Coleraine Harbour Commissioners, November 2025.
2015–	1318	13-11	Nora Stachura	2015	Shannon	

More post-service details can be found on the respective lifeboat class pages.

=== Inshore lifeboats ===
On station	Op.No.	Name	Type	Comments
1964	D-5	Unnamed	D-class (RFD PB16)	Initially stationed at Redcar in 1963.
1965–1966	D-16	Unnamed	D-class (RFD PB16)	Initially stationed at Pwllheli in 1964.
1966–1967	D-26	Unnamed	D-class (RFD PB16)	Initially stationed at Walmer in 1965.
1967–1977	D-142	Unnamed	D-class (RFD PB16)	
1978–1986	D-256	Lion Club I	D-class (Zodiac III)	
1986–1995	C-516	Belsize Charitable Trust	C-class (Zodiac Grand Raid IV)	
1995–1996	D-339	Unnamed	D-class (EA16)	Initially stationed at New Quay in 1987.
1996–1997	D-483	C. John Morris DFC	D-class (EA16)	Initially deployed in the relief fleet from 1995.
1997–2007	D-515	Spirit of the RCT	D-class (EA16)	
2007–2016	D-668	Colin Bramley Parker	D-class (IB1)	
2016–	D-803	Donald Dean	D-class (IB1)	

== Launch and recovery tractors ==
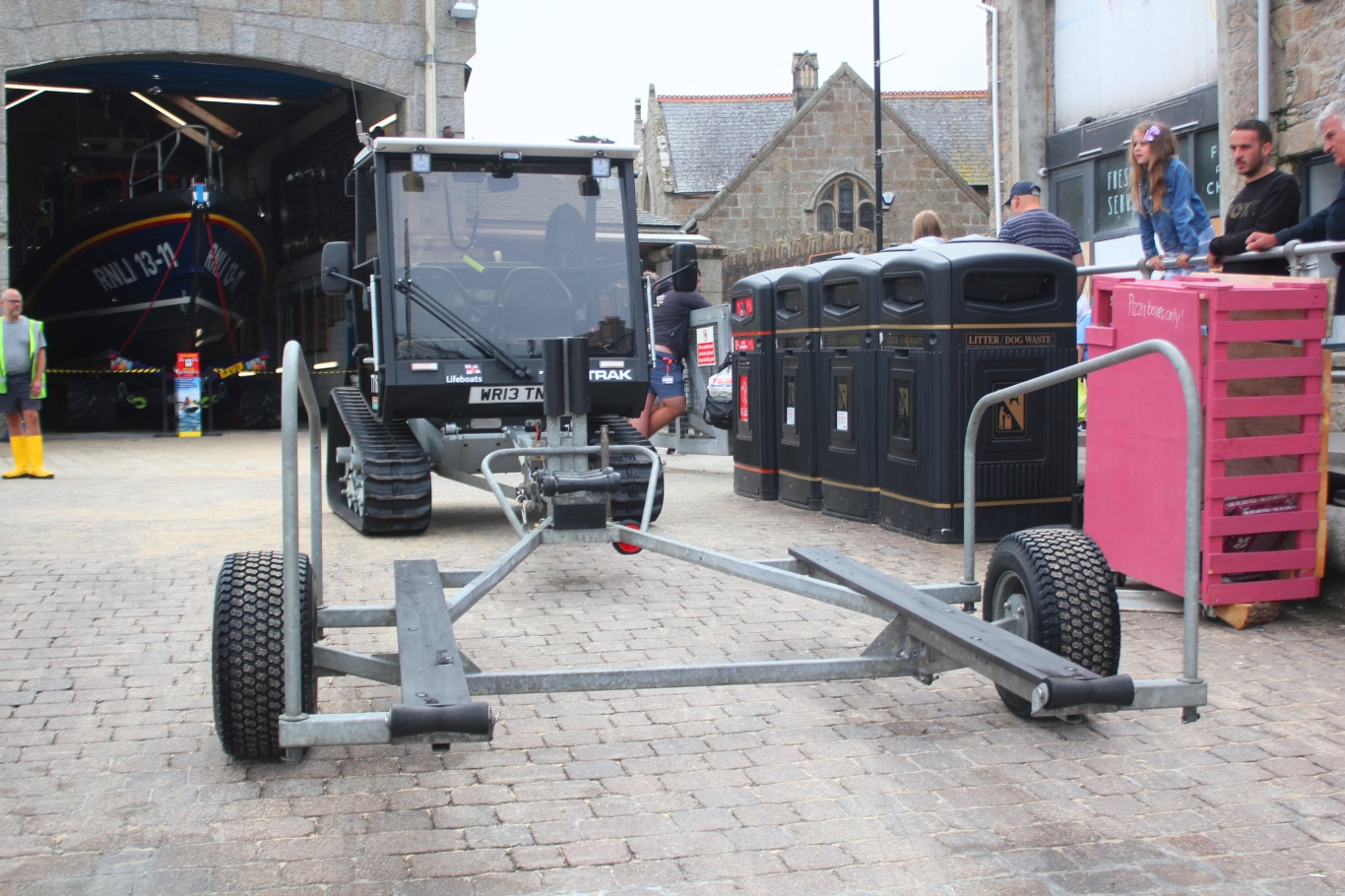
Tooltrak TT16

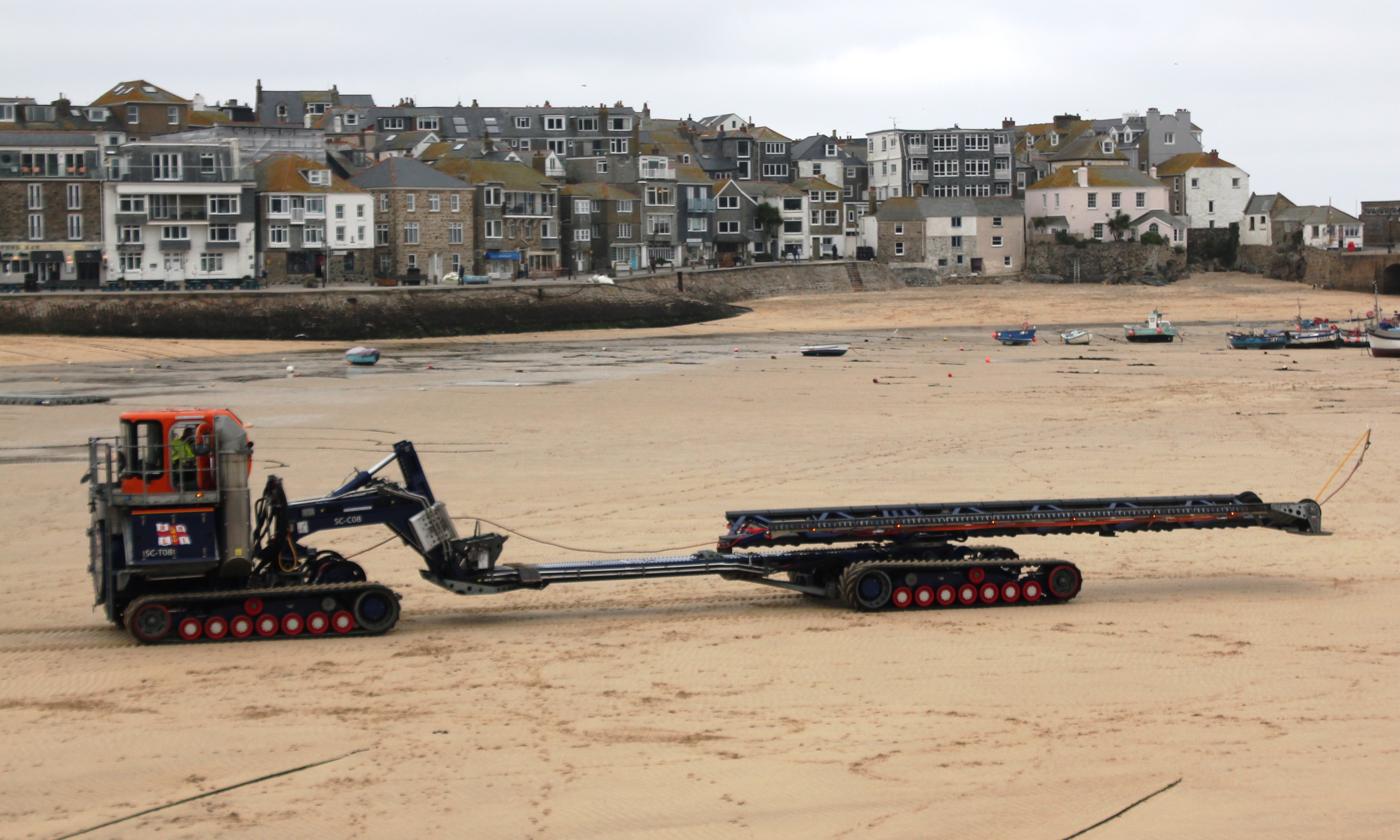
SC-T08 Kenneth George Fulford

On station	Op.No.	Reg. No.	Type	Comments
1940–1954	T35	FYM 558	Case L	
1954–1962	T60	OXO 323	Fowler Challenger III	
1962–1967	T56	MYR 426	Fowler Challenger III	
1967–1968	T61	PLA 561	Fowler Challenger III	
1968–1971	T78	BYN 568B	Case 1000D	
1971–1973	T74	136 HLC	Case 1000D	
1973–1978	T77	BGO 681B	Case 1000D	
1978–1985	T81	DLB 483C	Case 1000D	
1985–1986	T80	DLB 482C	Case 1000D	
1986–1989	T87	WEL 300S	Talus MBC Case 1150B	
1989–1997	T108	F133 FUJ	Talus MB-H Crawler	
1997–2006	T118	M224 SNT	Talus MB-H Crawler	
2006–2015	T113	J794 VUX	Talus MB-H Crawler	
2013–2022	TT22	HG63 VCD	Tooltrak	
2022–	TT16	WR13 TNN	Tooltrak	
2015–2025	SC-T08	HF15 FRX	SLARS (Supacat)	Named Kenneth George Fulford
2025–	SC-T28	HF72 FXD	SLARS (Clayton)	Unnamed

== See also ==
- List of RNLI stations
- List of former RNLI stations
- Royal National Lifeboat Institution lifeboats
