= New Quay Lifeboat Station =

RNLI lifeboat station in Ceredigion, Wales

- Gorsaf Bad Achub Cei Newydd

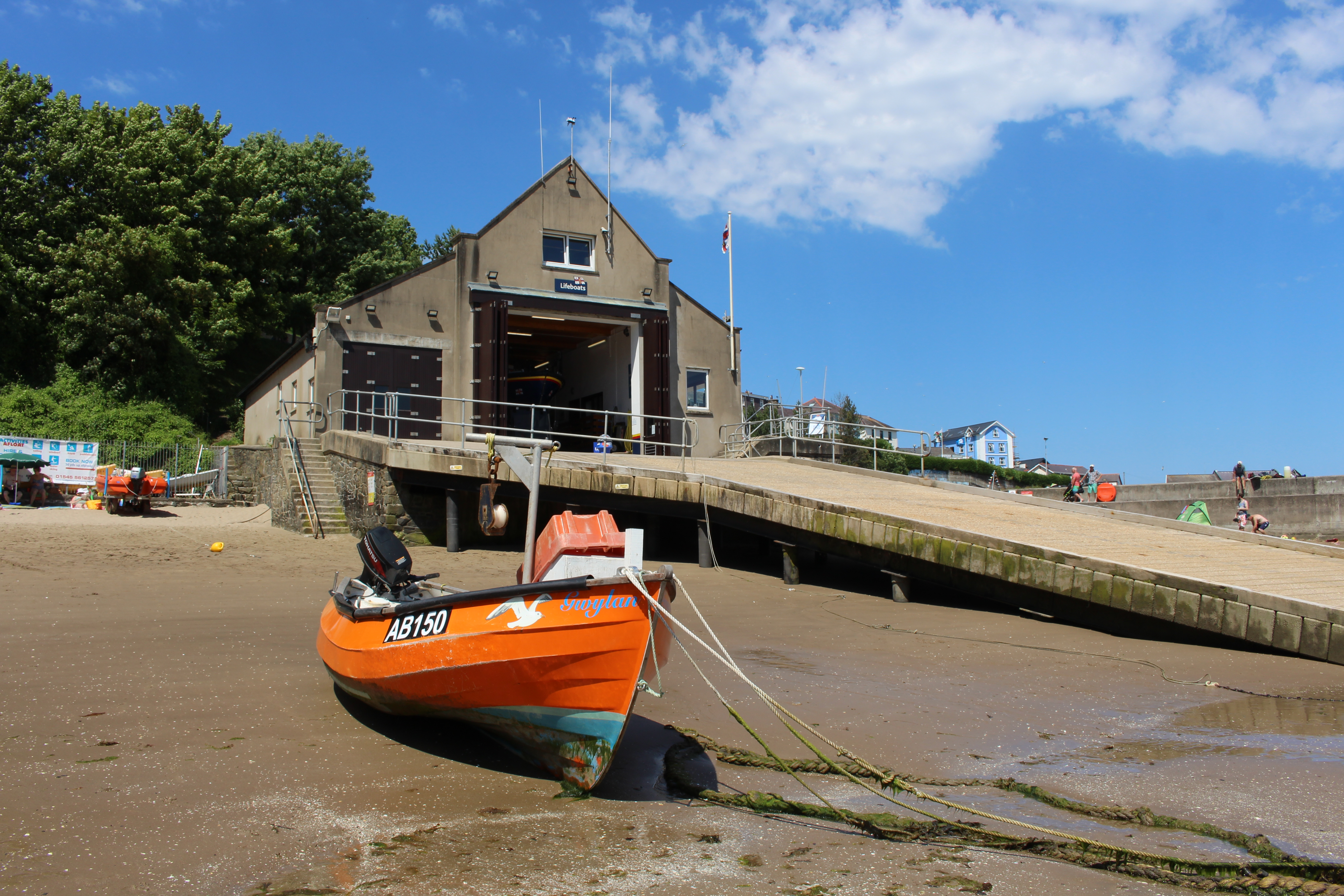
- New Quay Lifeboat Station, Ceredigion

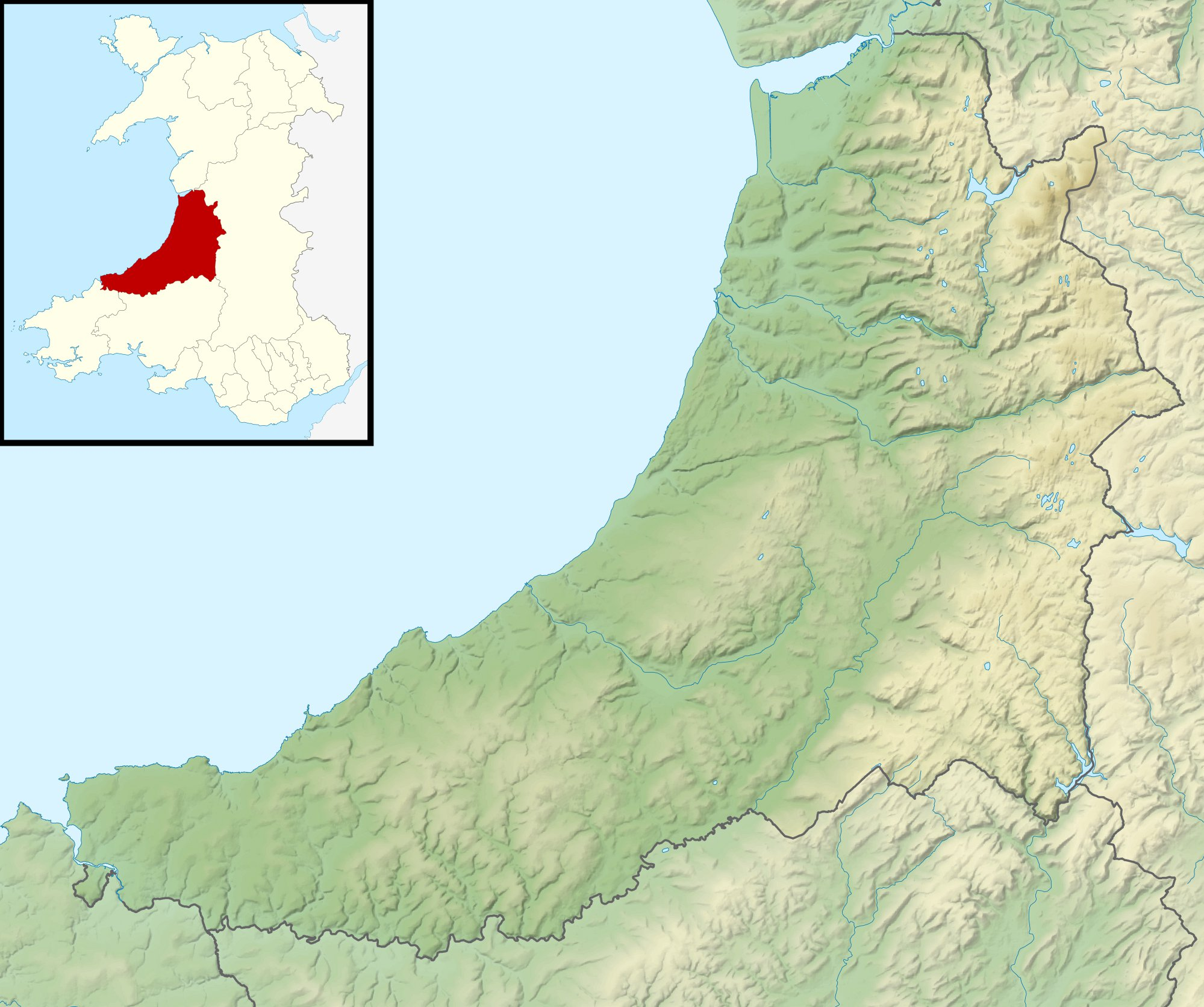
- Location within Ceredigion
- Former names: Newquay Lifeboat Station

General information
- Type: RNLI Lifeboat Station
- Location: Glanmor Terrace, New Quay, Ceredigion, Wales, SA45 9PS, UK
- Coordinates: 52°12′49″N 4°21′27″W
- Opened: 1864
- Owner: Royal National Lifeboat Institution

Website
- New Quay RNLI Lifeboat Station

New Quay Lifeboat Station (Welsh: Gorsaf Bad Achub Cei Newydd) is located off Glanmor Terrace in New Quay, a seaside town approximately 20 miles (32 km) south of Aberystwyth, overlooking Cardigan Bay, on the west coast of Ceredigion, West Wales.

A lifeboat was first placed at New Quay by the Royal National Lifeboat Institution (RNLI) in 1864, and celebrated 150 years of service in 2014.

The station operates two lifeboats: a Shannon-class All-weather lifeboat, 13-48 Roy Barker V (ON 1355), on station since 2023, and a D-class (IB1) Inshore lifeboat, Will Morgan (D-886), on station since 2024.

There is often confusion between the two lifeboat stations of New Quay in Wales, and Newquay in Cornwall. Despite clarity of the names on all maps of the period, this is not helped by RNLI documentation up to the Annual Report of 1902 often having the names reversed.

== History ==
=== 19th century ===
Numerous wrecks occurred along the coast at New Quay in Wales. In the great storm of 25–26 October 1859, six ships were wrecked at New Quay.

Communication from the Commodore Controller-General of HM Coastguard was received and read at the meeting of the RNLI committee of management on Thursday 2 June 1864. He had forwarded a report from the Inspecting Commander of Coastguard, who highlighted the necessity for a lifeboat at Newquay in Cardiganshire, with the establishment of a station being agreed.

By 1 January 1865, an article in the RNLI journal The Life-boat reported the arrival of a lifeboat, and the construction of a boathouse at New Quay. A 30 ft 0 in (9.14 m) Peake-class self-righting 'Pulling and Sailing' (P&S) lifeboat, one with sails and (10) oars, built by Forrestt of Limehouse, London in 1857, was transferred from its old station at Holyhead. Before its arrival, it was sent to the Woolfe boatyard in Shadwell, London, and extended to 35 ft (11 m), rowing 12 oars. Costing £161 when new, the boat had been funded by the Ancient Order of Foresters, and was named Forester.

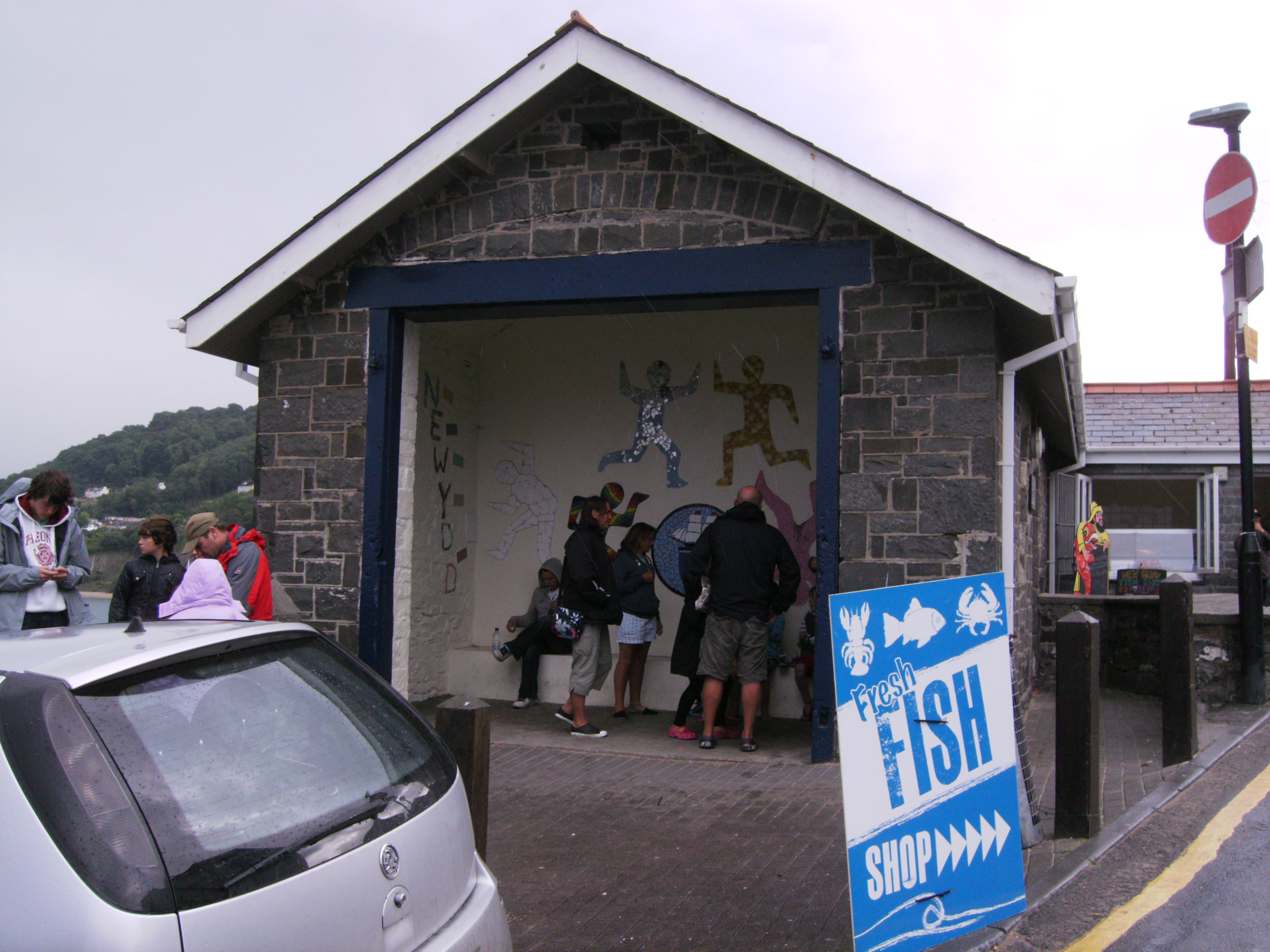
1864 Boathouse at New Quay

The boat was transported by the London and North Western and the Cambrian railway companies to Aberystwyth, from where it was rowed to its station at New Quay. A boathouse with a powerful winch was constructed at the top of a long incline from the harbour, at the bottom of St John's street, at a cost of £129-15s.

In 1872, additional funding was appropriated to the station by 'an anonymous lady', with the lifeboat being renamed Nelson. The lifeboat served New Quay for 22 years until 1886, launching 10 times, and saving 5 lives.

E. M. Lewis was Coxswain in 1880 when a lifeboatman was put aboard the barque Pacific to pilot her out of danger during a gale; the lifeboatmen successfully claimed salvage of £325 but then refused to pay the customary charge for the use of the lifeboat, resulting in Lewis's dismissal. He was succeeded by Owen Evans.

New Quay's new lifeboat was Frank and Marion (ON 62), built by Forrest & Son of Limehouse, London, costing £374, a gift from Dr and Mrs Smart of Kent in 1886. The day of the naming ceremony was declared a public holiday. Frank and Marion was built along the same lines as Nelson but with improved ballast tanks and rowing conformation to provide greater power for less effort. She effected several rescues before Coxswain Evans retired in 1905 after serving for 25 years. He was succeeded by David Davies. The lifeboat was launched a recorded seven times during her service, saving 19 lives.

=== 20th century ===
A new boathouse and slipway were built to the south of the original in 1903–4 at a cost of £1,312; the original boathouse was passed on to the Harbour Commission. The 1904 boathouse, when superseded in 1992, was renamed Cnwc-y-Glap and was still in use in 2014.

From 1907 the station used the pulling and sailing lifeboat, William Cantrell Ashley (ON 578), the longest-serving lifeboat at the station. The lifeboat was funded by the legacy of Charles Carr Ashley, which provided for five lifeboats and included funds for maintenance and for the benefit of crew members' widows and their families in the event of loss of life. The lifeboat was transported from London by rail to Fishguard and sailed to New Quay by the same 15 crew that had delivered Frank and Marion to Fishguard at the end of her service.

In August 1917, after going out to two boys fishing in a small boat in deteriorating weather, the lifeboat diverted to rescue two fishermen whose boat was foundering; all four were saved. For 17 years in the 1920s and 1930s the coxswain was Frederick Shayler. In November 1920 the lifeboat was called to HMS Amethyst, being towed to the breaker's at Milford Haven. In a gale and heavy seas the tow had parted and the lifeboat, dwarfed by the 3,000 ton cruiser, took off seven of the eight crew, with the captain refusing to leave (he was rescued two days later by Aberystwyth lifeboat).

In February 1946 William Cantrell Ashley was at sea for more than 24 hours in severe weather standing by the broken-down submarine HMS Universal and helping to rescue her crew. William Cantrell Ashley was the RNLI's last pulling and sailing lifeboat when she was retired in 1948 after 41 years' service. She was passed on to the first Outward Bound school at Aberdovey.

In the same year the RNLI adapted the station for a new lifeboat and built a tractor house.

The first powered lifeboat at New Quay was the Liverpool-class St Albans (ON 863) which served from 1948 to 1970.

An Inshore lifeboat and boathouse was added in 1967. In 1970 an Oakley-class lifeboat, Bird's Eye (ON 996), was donated to the station by Bird's Eye Foods Ltd. In 1992 another new boathouse was constructed to house both lifeboats. On her retirement, Bird's Eye went on display at the Seawatch Centre, Moelfre, and New Quay took delivery of a Mersey-class All-weather lifeboat.

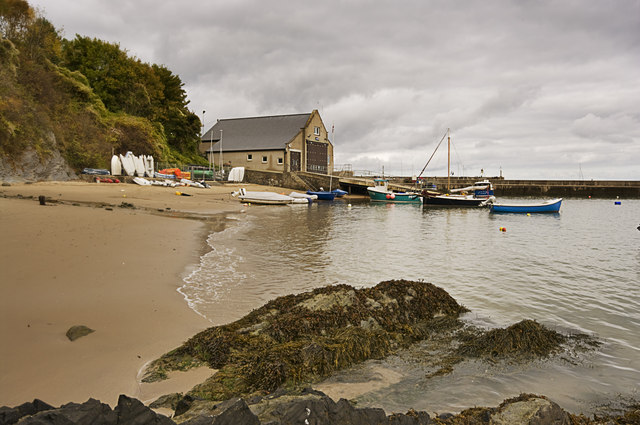
Lifeboat Station in 2009

In 1994 Winston Evans retired as coxswain after 29 years; he had been Britain's youngest coxswain aged 26 in 1965, taking over the helm from Rhoslan Davies. Winston's father, Arden Evans, had also been coxswain and between them they served for 40 years. In 1966 Winston received the RNLI Bronze Medal for a rescue in Cardigan Bay and was awarded the British Empire Medal in 1985. His successor was Daniel Potter, a great nephew of Frederick Shayler. Winston Evans recalled that in his time most crew members were fishermen, but in later years came from many different walks of life.

=== 21st century ===
Audrey Lawson-Johnston, a survivor of the RMS Lusitania sinking in 1915, gifted a new D-class lifeboat in 2004, named Amy Lea after her mother. Mrs Lawson-Johnston died in 2011 and when a new D-class came on station in 2012, it was named Audrey LJ in her memory.

The station celebrated 150 years of service in 2014 and local MP Mark Williams posted an Early Day Motion in the House of Commons in June to mark the occasion. In the same month the two lifeboats were re-dedicated in a ceremony which included a fly-past and a slate plaque being presented to the station by local fundraisers Quay West Ladies.

== Visitor access ==
This station is classed as an "Explore" lifeboat station by the RNLI, their highest level of visitor experience.

== Awards ==
The following are awards made at New Quay:

RNLI Bronze Medal

- David Winston Evans, Coxswain – 1966
  Evan Fowler, Motor Mechanic – 1966
  David Rees, Police Sergeant – 1966
  Mervyn Lloyd Thomas, Helm – 1974
- 'The Thanks of the Institution inscribed on Vellum'
  Idris Evans, Helm – 1967
  Trevor Evans, crew Member – 1967
  Peter Evans, crew Member – 1967
  Richard Llewellyn Davies, crew Member – 1974
  David Richard Phillips, crew Member – 1974
  Mervyn Lloyd Thomas, Helm – 1976
- 'Letter of Thanks from the Chairman of the Institution'
  Daniel Potter, Coxswain – 2023
  Bernie Davies, Mechanic – 2023
  Simon Rigby, Navigator – 2023
  Rees-Tom Jones, crew Member – 2023
  Dylan Price, crew Member – 2023
  Huw Williams, crew Member – 2023
- Exceptional First Aid Certificate
  Gary Hartley, crew member – 2011
- British Empire Medal
  David Winston Evans, Coxswain – 1986NYH

== New Quay lifeboats ==
=== Pulling and Sailing (P&S) lifeboats ===
ON (Note: ON is the RNLI's Official Number of the boat.)	Name	Built	On station	Class	Comments
Pre-313	Forester	1857	1864–1872	35-foot Peake self-righting (P&S)	(Note: 30 ft 0 in (9.14 m) x 7 ft 6 in (2.29 m) (10-oared) Peake-class self-righting (P&S) lifeboat, funded by the Ancient Order of Foresters, built by Forrestt of Limehouse, London, costing £161 when new. Extended to 35 ft 9 in (10.90 m) x 8 ft 0 in (2.44 m) (10-oared) by Woolfe of Shadwell in 1864); Previously at Holyhead. Renamed Nelson in 1872.
Pre-313	Nelson	1857	1872–1886	35-foot Peake self-righting (P&S)	(Note: Gift of an anonymous lady.); Broken up in 1886.
62	Frank and Marion	1886	1886–1907	37-foot self-righting (P&S)	(Note: 37 ft 0 in (11.28 m) x 8 ft 0 in (2.44 m) (12-oared) self-righting (P&S) lifeboat, gift of Mr and Mrs F. G. Smart of Tunbridge Wells, built by Forrestt of Limehouse, London, costing £374.); Broken up in 1907.
578	William Cantrell Ashley	1907	1907–1948	35-foot Liverpool (P&S)	(Note: 35 ft 0 in (10.67 m) x 10 ft 0 in (3.05 m) (12-oared) Liverpool-class non-self-righting (P&S) lifeboat, legacy of Mr C. C. Ashley of Menton, France, built by Thames Ironworks of Blackwall, London, costing £961.); Sold in 1949. Stored for restoration at The National Collections Centre, Nantgarw, December 2025.

Pre ON numbers are unofficial numbers used by the Lifeboat Enthusiasts' Society to reference early lifeboats not included on the official RNLI list.

=== Motor lifeboats ===
ON	Op.No. (Note: Op. No. is the RNLI's Operational Number of the boat carried on the hull.)	Name	Built	On station	Class	Comments
863	–	St Albans	1948	1948–1970	Liverpool	
996	37-25	Bird's Eye	1970	1970–1990	Oakley	Preserved at Moelfre
961	37-03	Calouste Gulbenkian	1961	1990–1991	Oakley	Previously at Weston-super-Mare
973	37-06	Fairlight	1964	1991–1992	Oakley	Previously at Hastings and St Ives
1172	12-15	Frank and Lena Clifford of Stourbridge	1991	1992–2023	Mersey	Transferred to the relief fleet.
1355	13-48	Roy Barker V	2023	2023–	Shannon	

=== Inshore lifeboats ===
Op.No.	Name	On station	Class	Comments
D-122	Unnamed	1967–1975	D-class (RFD PB16)	
D-238	Hemel Hempstead Round Table	1976–1987	D-class (Zodiac III)	
D-339	Unnamed	1987–1995	D-class (EA16)	
D-476	Corydd	1995–2003	D-class (EA16)	
D-460	Leicester Fox	2003–2004	D-class (EA16)	
D-616	Amy Lea	2004–2012	D-class (IB1)	
D-754	Audrey LJ	2012–2024	D-class (IB1)	
D-886	Will Morgan	2024–	D-class (IB1)	

=== Launch and recovery tractors ===
Op.No.	Reg. No.	Type	On station	Comments
T39	HYU 16	Case L	1948–1957	
T38	HYU 15	Case L	1957–1960	
T50	KLA 84	Case LA	1960–1965	
T43	JXR 934	Case LA	1965–1970	
T72	518 GYM	Case 1000D	1970–1981	
T71	519 GYM	Case 1000D	1981–1988	
T80	DLB 482C	Case 1000D	1988–1992	
T113	J794 VUX	Talus MB-H Crawler	1992–2001	
T102	E387 VAW	Talus MB-H Crawler	2001–2011	
T100	D466 RAW	Talus MB-H Crawler	2011–2023	
SC-T21	HF20 EBD	SLARS (SC Innovation)	2023–	

== See also ==
- List of RNLI stations
- List of former RNLI stations
- Royal National Lifeboat Institution lifeboats

== Bibliography ==
- Bryan, Roger (2014). The New Quay Lifeboats. Llanina Books. ISBN 0956719953.
