= Blackpool Lifeboat Station =

RNLI lifeboat station in Lancashire, England

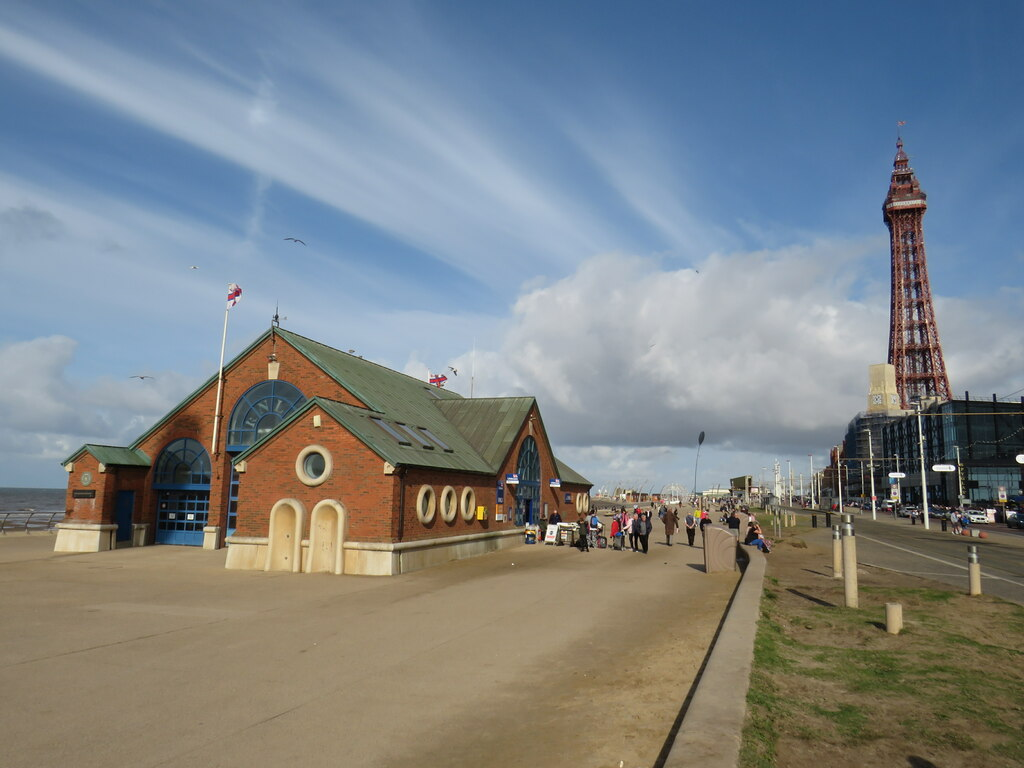
- Blackpool Lifeboat Station in 2021

- Location within Lancashire

General information
- Type: RNLI Lifeboat Station
- Location: Central Promenade, Blackpool, Lancashire, FY1 5JA, England
- Coordinates: 53°48′48.3″N 3°03′22.0″W
- Opened: 1864
- Owner: Royal National Lifeboat Institution

Website
- Blackpool RNLI Lifeboat Station

Blackpool Lifeboat Station is located between the North and Central Piers in Blackpool, a seaside town on the Fylde coast of Lancashire, England.

A lifeboat was first stationed at Blackpool by the Royal National Lifeboat Institution in 1864.

The station currently operates a B-class (Atlantic 85) Inshore lifeboat, William and Eleanor (B-867), and two smaller D-class (IB1) Inshore lifeboats, Blackpool Endeavour (D-864) and Phyllis Rowan (D-862).

== History ==
The Rev. R. Redman wrote to the RNLI in London in January 1864, requesting a lifeboat station for Blackpool, with his request endorsed by coastguard officer Capt. L. Barstow, RN. The Inspector of Lifeboats, Capt. J. R. Ward, RN, then visited the town in February of the same year, and fully supported the request.

It was formally agreed to establish a lifeboat station at Blackpool, at a meeting of the RNLI committee of management on 3 March 1864.

At the same meeting, the donation of £250 was acknowledged, received by the Institution on 18 February 1864, for a lifeboat to be stationed at Blackpool. The lifeboat was to be named Robert William, in memory of the late R. W. Hopkins of Preston, Lancashire, the donation being the gift of his widow and daughter. It was also reported that the £100 cost of the carriage was gifted by Miss Atherton, of Kersal Cell, Salford.

A 33 ft (10 m) 'Pulling and Sailing' (P&S) lifeboat, one with sails and (10) oars, was constructed by Forrestt, of Limehouse, London, and transported along with its carriage to Blackpool free of charge, by the London and North Western Railway. The first launch of the lifeboat took place on 20 July 1864, in front of an estimated crowd of 20,000 people.

Rev. Redman was appointed Honorary Secretary, Robert Bickerstaffe (Coxswain), John Swarbrick (Second Coxswain) and Will Parr (Bowman).

A location for a boathouse was found on Lytham Road, just off the promenade, and was built by Forshaw Bros. of Preston, at a cost of £193 14s 7d, offset by a donation of £100 from Sir Benjamin Heywood, Bt.

Blackpool lifeboat Robert William was launched into gale-force conditions on 26 February 1880, when the schooner Bessie Jones of Fleetwood, on passage from Glasgow to Liverpool, was driven onto Salthouse Bank, carrying a cargo of steel railway rails. The lifeboat was shorthanded, and took two hours hard rowing to get to the vessel. After rescuing the four crew, the lifeboat headed for St Annes, at one point ending on her beam ends on a sandbank, but made it safely ashore. Coxswain Robert Bickerstaffe was awarded the RNLI Silver Medal.

The promenade was widened in 1904, and the lifeboat had to be taken half a mile, pulled by hand, before reaching the only slipway. However, it was only in 1930 that a Clayton launch and recover tractor (T11) was first provided to Blackpool, which was of great benefit moving the boat, and launching on soft sand and shallow water.

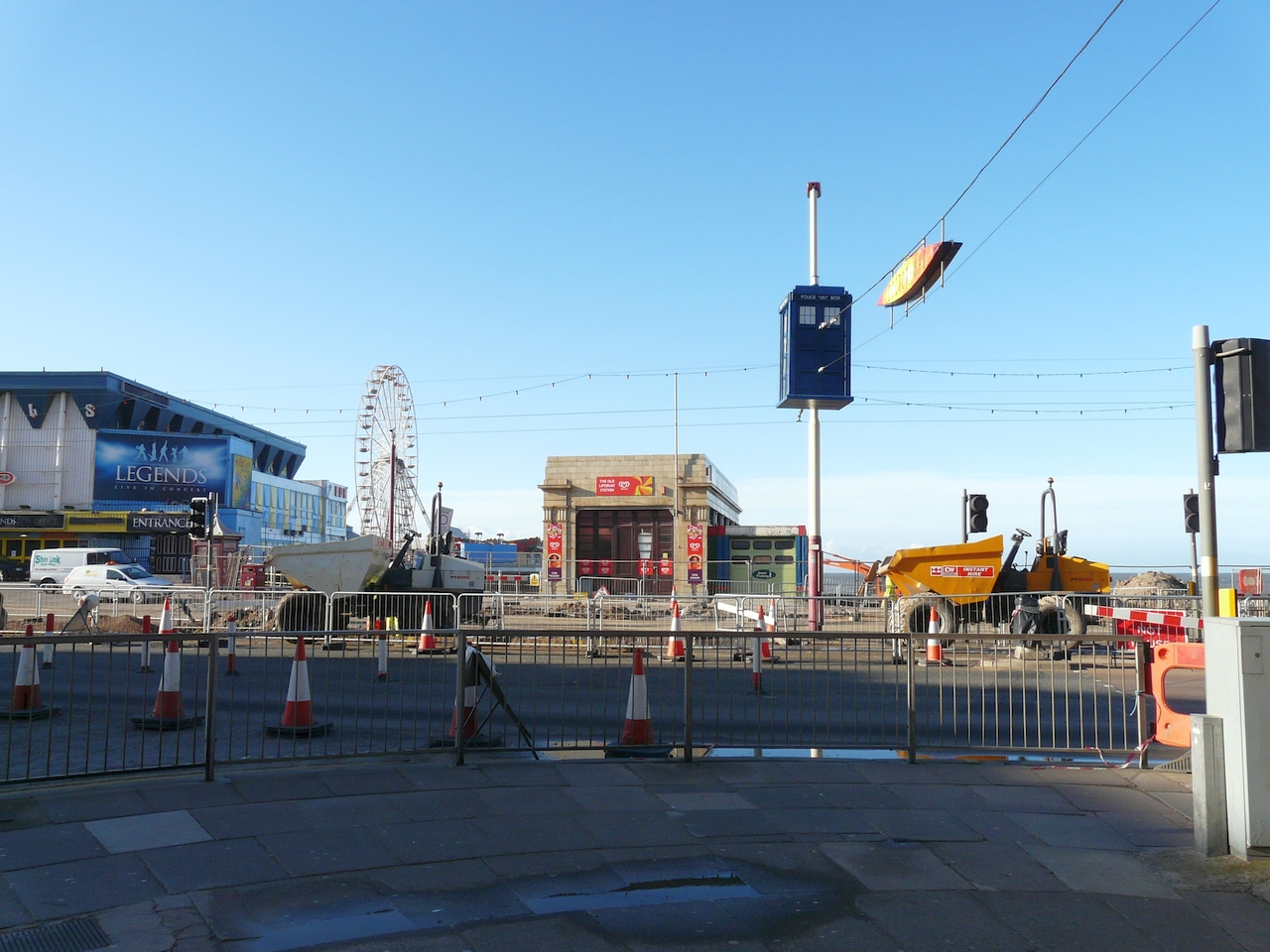
1936 Lifeboat Station

In 1936, it was decided to send a new motor lifeboat to Blackpool. This boat required a new bigger boat-house, which was constructed alongside Blackpool Central Pier. The Liverpool-class lifeboat Sarah Ann Austin (ON 800) was delivered to the station in June 1937. She was fortunate to arrive at all, as a fire had consumed Groves and Guttridge's boat builders yard, and three other new lifeboats, only 15 hours after she was launched.

Blackpool received the first of its D-class inshore lifeboats in May 1965, with the first services in June of the same year soon proving it to be a valuable new asset.

In 1975, with All-weather lifeboats to the north at Fleetwood, and to the south at Lytham St Annes, it was decided to withdraw the All-weather lifeboat from Blackpool. A B-class (Atlantic 21) was placed on trial between 1975 and 1979, but at the time, it was felt that the Atlantic 21 didn't fit the requirements at Blackpool, and so instead, a second D-class was placed on service at Blackpool in 1979. However, in 1992, a B-class (Atlantic 75) (B-700) was trialed for two weeks and felt to be much better suited to the station. Rotaract 1 (B-718) was placed on station in 1996, with the two D-class boats being retained.

With the need for a larger boathouse, and concrete degradation found in the 1930s boathouse, a new building was commissioned in 1996, located along the promenade, to house all three boats and launch tractors, with a visitor centre and souvenir shop. It was constructed by F. Parkinson Ltd, and formally handed over to the RNLI in September 1998.

On 23 April 2013, Blackpool received its latest B-class (Atlantic 85) Inshore lifeboat. The new lifeboat cost £204,000, and was funded from the bequest of Mr William James Seed of Stockport, who died in 2009. A ceremony held on Saturday 29 June 2013 to name the lifeboat had to be halted, when the boat was called out. After rescuing two adults and two children cut off by the tide, the lifeboat was duly named William and Eleanor (B-867), in memory of the donor and his sister. Alterations to the station to accommodate the boat, and a new launch carriage, were funded by the legacy of Ronald Austin Whittingham.

== Station honours ==
The following are awards made at Blackpool:

- RNLI Silver Medal
  Robert Bickerstaffe, Coxswain – 1880
  Robert Bickerstaffe, Coxswain – 1887 (Second-Service Clasp)
  William Reuben Parr, Coxswain – 1940
- RNLI Bronze Medal
  Thomas Edward Rimmer, Mechanic – 1940
  Keith Horrocks, Helm – 1988
  Philip Denham, Helm – 1988
- 'The Thanks of the Institution inscribed on Vellum'
  Stuart Cottam, crew member – 1988
  Terence Rogers, crew member – 1988
  Robert Browell, crew member – 1988
  Alan Parr, crew member – 1988
- 'A Letter of Thanks signed by the Director of the Institution'
  PC Pat Jackson – 1988
- Scroll awarded by The Liverpool Shipwreck Association
  Keith Horrocks – 1980
  Peter Canham – 1980
- 'A Framed Letter of Thanks signed by the Chairman of the Institution'
  Keith Horrocks, Helm – 1981
- Member, Order of the British Empire (MBE)
  Keith Horrocks – 1999NYH
- British Empire Medal
  Dorothy May Charnley, Shop Manager – 2022NYH

== Roll of honour ==
In memory of those lost whilst serving at Blackpool:

- Crewman had his foot crushed by the carriage wheel during launch for an exhibition display on 17 June 1880, and later died from his injuries.
  William Rimmer, crewman (27)

== Blackpool lifeboats and tractors ==
=== Pulling and Sailing (P&S) lifeboats ===
ON (Note: ON is the RNLI's Official Number of the boat.)	Name	Built	On station	Class	Comments
Pre-416	Robert William	1864	1864−1885	33-foot Peake self-righting (P&S)	(Note: 33 ft 0 in (10.06 m) x 8 ft 0 in (2.44 m) (10-oared) Peake-class self-righting (P&S) lifeboat, the gift of Mrs M. A. and Miss Hopkins of Preston, built by Forrestt of Limehouse, London, costing £250.); Broken up in 1885.
74	Samuel Fletcher of Manchester	1885	1885−1896	35-foot self-righting (P&S)	(Note: 35 ft 0 in (10.67 m) x 8 ft 6 in (2.59 m) (10-oared) self-righting (P&S) lifeboat, funded from the estate of Mr S. Fletcher, built by Forrestt of Limehouse, London, costing £398.); Sold in 1896.
393	Samuel Fletcher of Manchester	1896	1896−1930	36-foot 2in Watson (P&S)	
542	John Rowson Lingard	1905	1930−1937	36-foot Liverpool (P&S)	Previously at Mablethorpe.

Pre ON numbers are unofficial numbers used by the Lifeboat Enthusiasts' Society to reference early lifeboats not included on the official RNLI list.

=== Motor lifeboats ===
ON	Name	Built	On station	Class	Comments
800	Sarah Ann Austin	1937	1937−1961	Liverpool	
916	Maria Noble	1953	1961−1970	Liverpool	Previously at Exmouth
861	Edgar, George, Orlando and Eva Child	1948	1970−1975	Liverpool	Previously at St Ives.

All-weather lifeboat withdrawn 1975, replaced with B-class (Atlantic 21) Inshore lifeboat.
More post-service details can be found on the respective lifeboat class pages.

=== Inshore lifeboats ===
==== B class ====
Op.No. (Note: Op. No. is the RNLI's Operational Number carried on the hull or vehicle.)	Name	On station	Class	Comments
B-525	Unnamed	1975	B-class (Atlantic 21)	
B-528	Unnamed	1976−1978	B-class (Atlantic 21)	
B-537	Unnamed	1978−1979	B-class (Atlantic 21)	
B-718	Roteract 1	1996−1998	B-class (Atlantic 75)	
B-722	Beatrice Dorothy	1998	B-class (Atlantic 75)	
B-748	Bickerstaffe	1998−2013	B-class (Atlantic 75)	
B-867	William and Eleanor	2022−	B-class (Atlantic 85)	

==== D class (No.1) ====
Op.No.	Name	On station	Class	Comments
D-57	Unnamed	1965	D-class (RFD PB16)	
D-9	Unnamed	1965	D-class (RFD PB16)	
D-57	Unnamed	1965−1970	D-class (RFD PB16)	
D-156	Unnamed	1971	D-class (RFD PB16)	
D-117	Unnamed	1972−1981	D-class (RFD PB16)	
D-167	Unnamed	1981−1982	D-class (RFD PB16)	
D-192	Unnamed	1982−1984	D-class (RFD PB16)	
D-310	Unnamed	1984−1993	D-class (RFD PB16)	
D-442	Edgar Law	1993−2001	D-class (EA16)	
D-566	Norah Cadman	2001−2010	D-class (EA16)	
D-732	Basil Eric Brooks	2010−2022	D-class (IB1)	
D-864	Blackpool Endeavour	2022−	D-class (IB1)	

==== D class (No.2) ====
Op.No.	Name	On station	Class	Comments
D-116	Unnamed	1979−1982	D-class (RFD PB16)	
D-178	Unnamed	1982−1983	D-class (RFD PB16)	
D-300	Lodge of Peace No.322	1983−1992	D-class (RFD PB16)	
D-429	R.J.M.	1992−2000	D-class (EA16)	
D-558	William and Rose Nall	2000−2010	D-class (EA16)	
D-729	Eileen Mary George	2010−2022	D-class (IB1)	
D-862	Phyllis Rowan	2022−	D-class (IB1)	

=== Launch and Recovery tractors ===
Op.No.	Reg. No.	Type	On station	Comments
T11	BT 4414	Clayton	1930–1937	
T12	LLY 75	Clayton	1937–1938	
T31	FGU 821	Case L	1938–1956	
T30	FGO 975	Case L	1956–1964	
T36	FYM 853	Case L	1964–1965	
T47	KGP 2	Case LA	1965–1970	
T48	KGP 853	Case LA	1970–1976	
T79	DLB 481C	Case 1000D	1976–1977	
TW03	RLJ 367R	Talus MB-764 County	1977–1979	
TW17	H593 PUX	Talus MB-4H Hydrostatic (Mk1.5)	1996–2001	
TW16	H610 SUJ	Talus MB-4H Hydrostatic (Mk1.5)	2001–2009	
TW61	DX09 LRZ	Talus MB-4H Hydrostatic (Mk1.5)	2009–2022	
TW26	M423 OAW	Talus MB-4H Hydrostatic (Mk2)	2022–	

== See also ==
- List of RNLI stations
- List of former RNLI stations
- Royal National Lifeboat Institution lifeboats
- Talus Atlantic 85 DO-DO launch carriage
