= Talus MB-4H amphibious tractor =

RNLI Amphibious launch tractor

Talus MB-4H
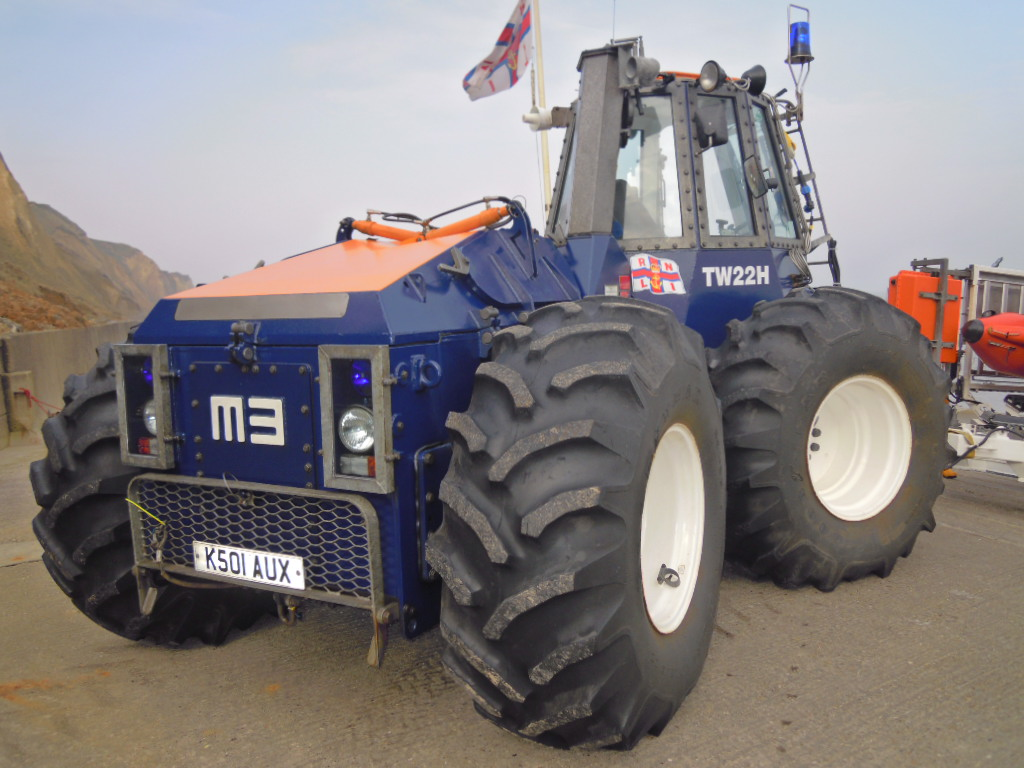
- Talus MB-4H RNLI Launch Vehicle
- Type: Launch vehicle
- Manufacturer: Clayton Engineering Limited
- Length: 4.475 m (14.68 ft)
- Width: 2.66 m (8.7 ft)
- Height: 2.75 m (9.0 ft)
- Weight: 9.38 Tonnes
- Propulsion: 4 wheel drive
- Engine model: Caterpillar 3114, 4 cylinder, 4.4 litre, Turbo Diesel
- Gross power: 105 hp (78 kW)
- Drawbar pull: 5-6 Tonnes
- Speed: 22 miles per hour (35 km/h)

Talus MB-4H is a four-wheel-drive launch tractor which was specifically designed for the Royal National Lifeboat Institution (RNLI), to launch and recover inshore lifeboats from beach launched lifeboat stations.

The tractor is produced by the British company of Clayton Engineering Limited who are based in Knighton, Powys. The tractor plays an important role within the operations required for saving lives at sea.

== Technical specification ==
The driver can be seated facing forwards or backwards. The tractor has a steering wheel and throttle pedal for each direction, with fully automatic transmission.

The enclosed cab is fully waterproof, and the vehicle can be operated in calm water to a depth of 1.6m.

Two glazed waterproof boxes containing headlights, side and tail lights, indicators and blue flashing lights, are fitted to both ends of the tractor. There are two cab mounted floodlights at the front and rear.

All of the following fleet details are referenced to the 2026 Lifeboat Enthusiast Society Handbook, with information retrieved directly from RNLI records.

== RNLI Talus MB-4H Fleet ==
Op.No. (Note: Op. No. is the RNLI's Operational Number of the tractor.)	Reg No.	Station	In Service	Image	Current Lifeboat Payload	Comments
TW16Hb (Mk.1.5)	H610 SUJ	Aberdovey	1991–1993			
TW16Hb (Mk.1.5)	H610 SUJ	Relief fleet	1993–1995			
TW16Hb (Mk.1.5)	H610 SUJ	New Brighton	1995–2001			
TW16Hb (Mk.1.5)	H610 SUJ	Blackpool	2001–2009			
TW16Hb (Mk.1.5)	H610 SUJ	Relief fleet	2009–2010			
TW16Hb (Mk.1.5)	H610 SUJ	Mablethorpe	2010–2025			
TW16Hb (Mk.1.5)	H610 SUJ	Relief fleet	2025–			
TW17Hb (Mk.1.5)	H593 PUX	New Brighton	1990–1995			
TW17Hb (Mk.1.5)	H593 PUX	Blackpool	1996–2001			
TW17Hb (Mk.1.5)	H593 PUX	Relief fleet	2001–2003			
TW17Hb (Mk.1.5)	H593 PUX	Redcar	2003–2010			
TW17Hb (Mk.1.5)	H593 PUX	Relief fleet	2010–2011			
TW17Hb (Mk.1.5)	H593 PUX	Atlantic College	2011–2013			
TW17Hb (Mk.1.5)	H593 PUX	Relief fleet	2013–2014			
TW17Hb (Mk.1.5)	H593 PUX	Training	2014–2018			
TW17Hb (Mk.1.5)	H593 PUX	Relief fleet	2018–			
TW18Hb (Mk.1.5)	H710 RUX	Cullercoats	1991–1993			
TW18Hb (Mk.1.5)	H710 RUX	Relief fleet	1993–1995			
TW18Hb (Mk.1.5)	H710 RUX	Redcar	1995–2003			
TW18Hb (Mk.1.5)	H710 RUX	Flamborough	2003–2012			
TW18Hb (Mk.1.5)	H710 RUX	Hunstanton	2013–2021			
TW18Hb (Mk.1.5)	H710 RUX	Clacton-on-Sea	2021–2025			
TW18Hb (Mk.1.5)	H710 RUX	Relief fleet	2025–			
TW19Hc (Mk.2)	J120 VNT	Redcar	1991–1995		Atlantic 85; Florence and Ernest Bowles (B-937)	
TW19Hc (Mk.2)	J120 VNT	Relief fleet	1995–1998		Atlantic 85; Florence and Ernest Bowles (B-937)	
TW19Hc (Mk.2)	J120 VNT	Newbiggin	1998–1999		Atlantic 85; Florence and Ernest Bowles (B-937)	
TW19Hc (Mk.2)	J120 VNT	Hunstanton	1999–2000		Atlantic 85; Florence and Ernest Bowles (B-937)	
TW19Hc (Mk.2)	J120 VNT	Relief fleet	2000–2006		Atlantic 85; Florence and Ernest Bowles (B-937)	
TW19Hc (Mk.2)	J120 VNT	Rye Harbour	2006–2010		Atlantic 85; Florence and Ernest Bowles (B-937)	
TW19Hc (Mk.2)	J120 VNT	Relief fleet	2010–2014		Atlantic 85; Florence and Ernest Bowles (B-937)	
TW19Hc (Mk.2)	J120 VNT	Aberystwyth	2014–		Atlantic 85; Florence and Ernest Bowles (B-937)	
TW20Hc (Mk.2)	J125 WUJ	Hunstanton	1992–1999		Atlantic 85; Charles Dibdin (Civil Service No.51) (B-837)	
TW20Hc (Mk.2)	J125 WUJ	Relief fleet	1999–2003		Atlantic 85; Charles Dibdin (Civil Service No.51) (B-837)	
TW20Hc (Mk.2)	J125 WUJ	Newbiggin	2003–2014		Atlantic 85; Charles Dibdin (Civil Service No.51) (B-837)	
TW20Hc (Mk.2)	J125 WUJ	Relief fleet	2014–2016		Atlantic 85; Charles Dibdin (Civil Service No.51) (B-837)	
TW20Hc (Mk.2)	J125 WUJ	New Brighton	2016–		Atlantic 85; Charles Dibdin (Civil Service No.51) (B-837)	
TW21Hc (Mk.2)	J495 XUJ	Newbiggin	1992–2003		Atlantic 85	
TW21Hc (Mk.2)	J495 XUJ	Relief fleet	2003–2004		Atlantic 85	
TW21Hc (Mk.2)	J495 XUJ	Cullercoats	2004–2017		Atlantic 85	
TW21Hc (Mk.2)	J495 XUJ	Relief fleet	2017		Atlantic 85	
TW21Hc (Mk.2)	J495 XUJ	Littlestone-on-Sea	2017–2023		Atlantic 85	
TW21Hc (Mk.2)	J495 XUJ	Relief fleet	2023–2026		Atlantic 85	
TW21Hc (Mk.2)	J495 XUJ	Ilfracombe	2026–		Atlantic 85	
TW22Hc (Mk.2)	K501 AUX	Cullercoats	1993–2004		Atlantic 85; Richard Wake Burdon (B-864)	
TW22Hc (Mk.2)	K501 AUX	Relief fleet	2004–2005		Atlantic 85; Richard Wake Burdon (B-864)	
TW22Hc (Mk.2)	K501 AUX	Sheringham	2005–2015		Atlantic 85; Richard Wake Burdon (B-864)	
TW22Hc (Mk.2)	K501 AUX	Newbiggin	2015–		Atlantic 85; Richard Wake Burdon (B-864)	
TW23Hc (Mk.2)	K805 CUX	Flamborough	1993–2003		Atlantic 85; Lewisco (B-877)	
TW23Hc (Mk.2)	K805 CUX	Hunstanton	2003–2013		Atlantic 85; Lewisco (B-877)	
TW23Hc (Mk.2)	K805 CUX	Relief fleet	2013–2014		Atlantic 85; Lewisco (B-877)	
TW23Hc (Mk.2)	K805 CUX	Whitstable	2014–		Atlantic 85; Lewisco (B-877)	
TW24Hc (Mk.2)	K313 ENT	Sheringham	1994–2005		Atlantic 85; William Henry Liddington (B-834)	
TW24Hc (Mk.2)	93-D-45502	Bundoran	2005–		Atlantic 85; William Henry Liddington (B-834)	
TW25Hc (Mk.2)	–	Bundoran	1994–2005			
TW25Hc (Mk.2)	L807 KNT	Newquay	2006–2017			
TW25Hc (Mk.2)	L807 KNT	Happisburgh	2018–2023			
TW25Hc (Mk.2)	L807 KNT	Relief fleet	2023–			
TW26Hc; (Mk.2)	M423 OAW	Newquay	1995–2006		Atlantic 85; William and Eleanor (B-867)	
TW26Hc; (Mk.2)	M423 OAW	Penarth	2006–2021		Atlantic 85; William and Eleanor (B-867)	
TW26Hc; (Mk.2)	M423 OAW	Relief fleet	2021–2022		Atlantic 85; William and Eleanor (B-867)	
TW26Hc; (Mk.2)	M423 OAW	Blackpool	2022–		Atlantic 85; William and Eleanor (B-867)	
TW27Hc (Mk.2)	M741 RUX	Penarth	1996–2006		Atlantic 85; RNLB The Oddfellows (B-818)	
TW27Hc (Mk.2)	M741 RUX	Relief fleet	2006–2008		Atlantic 85; RNLB The Oddfellows (B-818)	
TW27Hc (Mk.2)	M741 RUX	Porthcawl	2008–2015		Atlantic 85; RNLB The Oddfellows (B-818)	
TW27Hc (Mk.2)	M741 RUX	Relief fleet	2015–2022		Atlantic 85; RNLB The Oddfellows (B-818)	
TW27Hc (Mk.2)	M741 RUX	Sheringham	2022–		Atlantic 85; RNLB The Oddfellows (B-818)	
TW28H (Mk.3)	N671 UAW	Rye Harbour	1996–2006		Atlantic 85; Jacqueline Saville (B-887)	
TW28H (Mk.3)	N671 UAW	Relief fleet	2006–2013		Atlantic 85; Jacqueline Saville (B-887)	
TW28H (Mk.3)	N671 UAW	Aberystwyth	2013–2014		Atlantic 85; Jacqueline Saville (B-887)	
TW28H (Mk.3)	N671 UAW	Relief fleet	2014–2019		Atlantic 85; Jacqueline Saville (B-887)	
TW28H (Mk.3)	N671 UAW	Trials	2019–2025		Atlantic 85; Jacqueline Saville (B-887)	
TW28H (Mk.3)	N671 UAW	Mablethorpe	2025–		Atlantic 85; Jacqueline Saville (B-887)	
TW29Hc (Mk.2)	N144 WUJ	Porthcawl	1996–2008		Atlantic 85; Rose Of The Shires (B-832)	
TW29Hc (Mk.2)	N144 WUJ	Relief fleet	2008–2009		Atlantic 85; Rose Of The Shires (B-832)	
TW29Hc (Mk.2)	N144 WUJ	Happisburgh	2009–2012		Atlantic 85; Rose Of The Shires (B-832)	
TW29Hc (Mk.2)	N144 WUJ	Relief fleet	2012–2015		Atlantic 85; Rose Of The Shires (B-832)	
TW29Hc (Mk.2)	N144 WUJ	Porthcawl	2015–		Atlantic 85; Rose Of The Shires (B-832)	
TW36Hc (Mk.2)	N805 XUJ	Relief fleet	1996–1997		Atlantic 85; Sheila & Dennis Tongue II (B-894)	
TW36Hc (Mk.2)	N805 XUJ	Criccieth	1997–2003		Atlantic 85; Sheila & Dennis Tongue II (B-894)	
TW36Hc (Mk.2)	N805 XUJ	Training (Instow)	2003–2007		Atlantic 85; Sheila & Dennis Tongue II (B-894)	
TW36Hc (Mk.2)	N805 XUJ	Relief fleet	2007–2012		Atlantic 85; Sheila & Dennis Tongue II (B-894)	
TW36Hc (Mk.2)	N805 XUJ	Happisburgh	2012–2017		Atlantic 85; Sheila & Dennis Tongue II (B-894)	
TW36Hc (Mk.2)	N805 XUJ	Relief fleet	2018–2019		Atlantic 85; Sheila & Dennis Tongue II (B-894)	
TW36Hc (Mk.2)	N805 XUJ	Looe	2019–		Atlantic 85; Sheila & Dennis Tongue II (B-894)	
TW37Hc (Mk.2)	P898 CUX	Relief fleet	1996–2000		Atlantic 85; Uncle Johnny (B-936)	
TW37Hc (Mk.2)	P898 CUX	Hunstanton	2000–2003		Atlantic 85; Uncle Johnny (B-936)	
TW37Hc (Mk.2)	P898 CUX	Relief fleet	2003–2008		Atlantic 85; Uncle Johnny (B-936)	
TW37Hc (Mk.2)	P898 CUX	Littlestone-on-Sea	2008–2015		Atlantic 85; Uncle Johnny (B-936)	
TW37Hc (Mk.2)	P898 CUX	Sheringham	2015–2017		Atlantic 85; Uncle Johnny (B-936)	
TW37Hc (Mk.2)	P898 CUX	Newquay	2017–		Atlantic 85; Uncle Johnny (B-936)	
TW45Ha (Mk.1)	T249 JNT	Littlestone-on-Sea	1999–2008		Atlantic 85; Loving You (B-942)	
TW45Ha (Mk.1)	T249 JNT	New Brighton	2008–2016		Atlantic 85; Loving You (B-942)	
TW45Ha (Mk.1)	T249 JNT	Relief fleet	2016–2023		Atlantic 85; Loving You (B-942)	
TW45Ha (Mk.1)	T249 JNT	Cardigan	2023–2024		Atlantic 85; Loving You (B-942)	
TW45Ha (Mk.1)	T249 JNT	Relief fleet	2024–2025		Atlantic 85; Loving You (B-942)	
TW45Ha (Mk.1)	T249 JNT	Cleethorpes	2025–		Atlantic 85; Loving You (B-942)	
TW46Hb (Mk.1.5)	V938 EAW	New Brighton	2001–2008		Atlantic 85; Albatross (B-871)	
TW46Hb (Mk.1.5)	V938 EAW	Relief fleet	2008–2009		Atlantic 85; Albatross (B-871)	
TW46Hb (Mk.1.5)	V938 EAW	Aberystwyth	2009–2013		Atlantic 85; Albatross (B-871)	
TW46Hb (Mk.1.5)	V938 EAW	Rye Harbour	2013–2014		Atlantic 85; Albatross (B-871)	
TW46Hb (Mk.1.5)	V938 EAW	Relief fleet	2014–2017		Atlantic 85; Albatross (B-871)	
TW46Hb (Mk.1.5)	V938 EAW	Sheringham	2017–2022		Atlantic 85; Albatross (B-871)	
TW46Hb (Mk.1.5)	V938 EAW	Flamborough	2022–2023		Atlantic 85; Albatross (B-871)	
TW46Hb (Mk.1.5)	V938 EAW	Relief fleet	2023–2024		Atlantic 85; Albatross (B-871)	
TW46Hb (Mk.1.5)	V938 EAW	Cardigan	2024–		Atlantic 85; Albatross (B-871)	
TW49Hb (Mk.1.5)	W652 RNT	Whitstable	2000–2008		Atlantic 85; Joy Morris MBE (B-831)	
TW49Hb (Mk.1.5)	W652 RNT	Relief fleet	2008–2010		Atlantic 85; Joy Morris MBE (B-831)	
TW49Hb (Mk.1.5)	W652 RNT	St Bees	2010–		Atlantic 85; Joy Morris MBE (B-831)	
TW50Hb (Mk.1.5)	W419 UUJ	St Bees	2000–2010		Atlantic 85; Leicester Challenge III (B-858)	
TW50Hb (Mk.1.5)	W419 UUJ	Redcar	2010–		Atlantic 85; Leicester Challenge III (B-858)	
TW51Hb (Mk.1.5)	X651 BUJ	Mablethorpe	2001–2010		Atlantic 85; Spirit of West Norfolk (B-848)	
TW51Hb (Mk.1.5)	X651 BUJ	Relief fleet	2010–2011		Atlantic 85; Spirit of West Norfolk (B-848)	
TW51Hb (Mk.1.5)	X651 BUJ	Cardigan	2011–2023		Atlantic 85; Spirit of West Norfolk (B-848)	
TW51Hb (Mk.1.5)	X651 BUJ	Relief fleet	2023–2025		Atlantic 85; Spirit of West Norfolk (B-848)	
TW51Hb (Mk.1.5)	X651 BUJ	Hunstanton	2025–		Atlantic 85; Spirit of West Norfolk (B-848)	
TW52Hc (Mk.2)	Y506 JNT	Cardigan	2002–2011		Atlantic 85; Elizabeth Jane Palmer (B-820)	
TW52Hc (Mk.2)	Y506 JNT	Relief fleet	2011–2012		Atlantic 85; Elizabeth Jane Palmer (B-820)	
TW52Hc (Mk.2)	Y506 JNT	Flamborough	2012–2022		Atlantic 85; Elizabeth Jane Palmer (B-820)	
TW52Hc (Mk.2)	Y506 JNT	Relief fleet	2022–2023		Atlantic 85; Elizabeth Jane Palmer (B-820)	
TW52Hc (Mk.2)	Y506 JNT	Flamborough	2023–		Atlantic 85; Elizabeth Jane Palmer (B-820)	
TW53Hb (Mk.1.5)	DU51 FET	Atlantic College	2002–2011		Atlantic 85; Sheila & Dennis Tongue III (B-897)	
TW53Hb (Mk.1.5)	DU51 FET	Relief fleet	2011–2012		Atlantic 85; Sheila & Dennis Tongue III (B-897)	
TW53Hb (Mk.1.5)	DU51 FET	Staithes and Runswick	2012–		Atlantic 85; Sheila & Dennis Tongue III (B-897)	
TW54Hc (Mk.2)	DU02 WEJ	Aberystwyth	2002–2009			
TW54Hc (Mk.2)	DU02 WEJ	Relief fleet	2009–2011			
TW54Hc (Mk.2)	DU02 WEJ	Staithes and Runswick	2011–2012			
TW54Hc (Mk.2)	DU02 WEJ	Relief fleet	2012–2014			
TW54Hc (Mk.2)	DU02 WEJ	Rye Harbour	2014–2020			
TW54Hc (Mk.2)	DU02 WEJ	Relief fleet	2020–			
TW55Hc (Mk.2)	DU52 XGA	Staithes and Runswick	2003–2011		Atlantic 85; Doris Day and Brian (B-914)	
TW55Hc (Mk.2)	DU52 XGA	Relief fleet	2011–2017		Atlantic 85; Doris Day and Brian (B-914)	
TW55Hc (Mk.2)	DU52 XGA	Burnham-on-Sea	2017–		Atlantic 85; Doris Day and Brian (B-914)	
TW56Hc (Mk.2)	DY52 EFR	Burnham-on-Sea	2003–2017		Atlantic 85; Hello Herbie II (B-900)	
TW56Hc (Mk.2)	DY52 EFR	Relief fleet	2017–2020		Atlantic 85; Hello Herbie II (B-900)	
TW56Hc (Mk.2)	DY52 EFR	Rye Harbour	2020–		Atlantic 85; Hello Herbie II (B-900)	
TW57Hc (Mk.2)	DX03 UZF	Looe	2003–2019			
TW57Hc (Mk.2)	DX03 UZF	Relief fleet	2019–2021			
TW57Hc (Mk.2)	DX03 UZF	Hunstanton	2021–2025			
TW57Hc (Mk.2)	DX03 UZF	Relief fleet	2025–			
TW58Hc (Mk.2)	DX53 VRF	Criccieth	2003–2013		Atlantic 85; Berylium (B-955)	
TW58Hc (Mk.2)	DX53 VRF	Relief fleet	2013–2015		Atlantic 85; Berylium (B-955)	
TW58Hc (Mk.2)	DX53 VRF	Littlestone-on-Sea	2015–2017		Atlantic 85; Berylium (B-955)	
TW58Hc (Mk.2)	DX53 VRF	Relief fleet	2018–2025		Atlantic 85; Berylium (B-955)	
TW58Hc (Mk.2)	DX53 VRF	Newcastle	2025–		Atlantic 85; Berylium (B-955)	
TW59Hc (Mk.2)	DU04 DVW	Relief fleet	2004–2008		Atlantic 85; Daddy's Girl (B-935)	
TW59Hc (Mk.2)	DU04 DVW	Whitstable	2008–2014		Atlantic 85; Daddy's Girl (B-935)	
TW59Hc (Mk.2)	DU04 DVW	Relief fleet	2014		Atlantic 85; Daddy's Girl (B-935)	
TW59Hc (Mk.2)	DU04 DVW	Newbiggin	2014–2015		Atlantic 85; Daddy's Girl (B-935)	
TW59Hc (Mk.2)	DU04 DVW	Relief fleet	2015–2017		Atlantic 85; Daddy's Girl (B-935)	
TW59Hc (Mk.2)	DU04 DVW	Cullercoats	2017–		Atlantic 85; Daddy's Girl (B-935)	
TW60Hc (Mk.2)	DX54 UYM	Clacton-on-Sea	2006–2021		Atlantic 85; Maureen Lilian (B-839)	
TW60Hc (Mk.2)	DX54 UYM	Relief fleet	2021		Atlantic 85; Maureen Lilian (B-839)	
TW60Hc (Mk.2)	DX54 UYM	Penarth	2021–		Atlantic 85; Maureen Lilian (B-839)	
TW61Hb (Mk.1.5)	DX09 LRZ	Blackpool	2009–2022		{Atlantic 85; Jean McIvor (B-922)	
TW61Hb (Mk.1.5)	DX09 LRZ	Relief fleet	2022–2024		{Atlantic 85; Jean McIvor (B-922)	
TW61Hb (Mk.1.5)	DX09 LRZ	Littlestone-on-Sea	2024–		{Atlantic 85; Jean McIvor (B-922)	
TW62Hb (Mk.1.5)	DX59 LHZ	Rye Harbour	2010–2013		Atlantic 85; Frank Townley (B-938)	
TW62Hb (Mk.1.5)	DX59 LHZ	Criccieth	2013–		Atlantic 85; Frank Townley (B-938)	
TW65H (Mk.3)	HF24 BWO	Margate	2024–		Atlantic 85; Colonel Stock (B930)	
TW66H; (Mk.3)	–	Built for Private Owner				
TW67H (Mk.3)	–	In Build				

== See also ==
- Fowler Challenger III launch tractor
- New Holland TC45 launch tractor
- Talus MB-764 launch tractor
- Talus MB-H launch tractor
- Talus Atlantic 85 DO-DO launch carriage
