= Mablethorpe Lifeboat Station =

RNLI Lifeboat station in Lincolnshire, England

- Flag of the RNLI

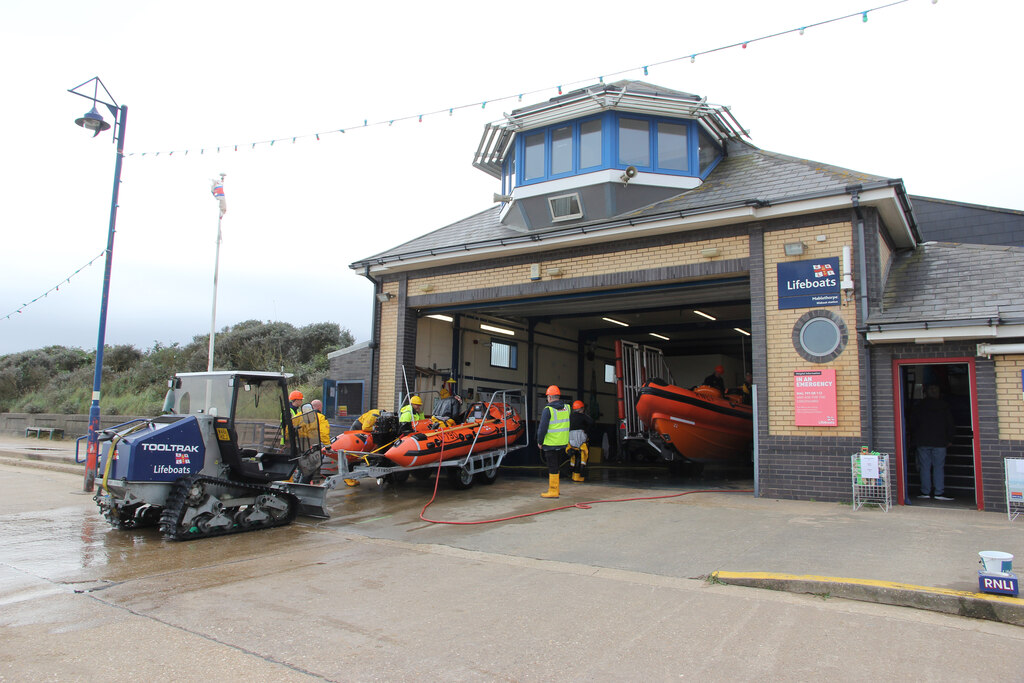
- Mablethorpe Lifeboat Station in 2023

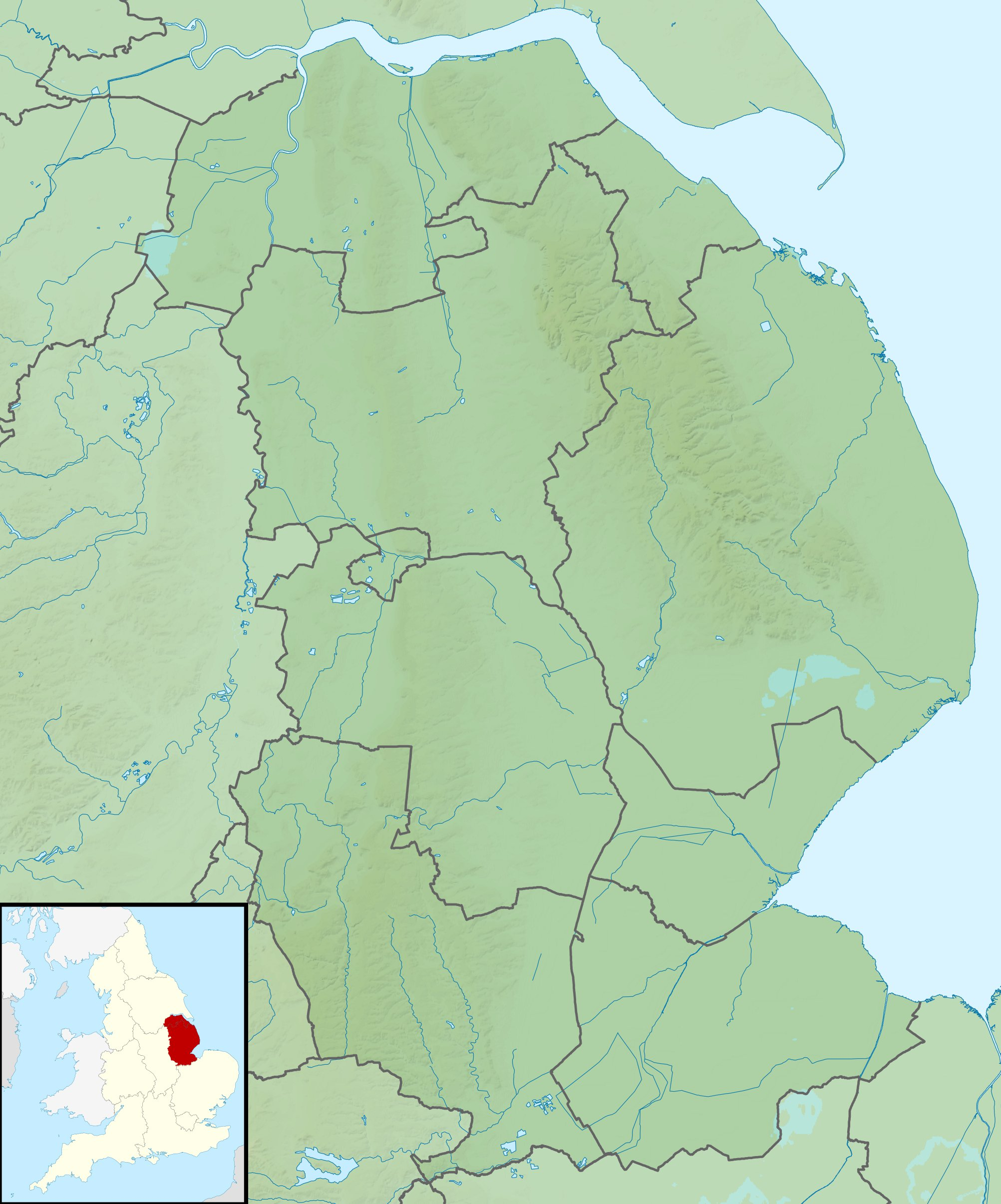
- Location within Lincolnshire

General information
- Type: Lifeboat station
- Location: The Promenade, Off Gibraltar Road, Mablethorpe, Lincolnshire, LN12 2AT, United Kingdom
- Coordinates: 53.340778°N 0.265917°E
- Opened: First station 1883; Current station 1965
- Owner: Royal National Lifeboat Institution

Website
- Mablethorpe RNLI Lifeboat Station

Mabelthorpe Lifeboat Station can be found just off Gibraltar Road, on the promenade at Mablethorpe, a seaside resort approximately 15 miles (24 km) north of Skegness, on the east coast of England, in the county of Lincolnshire.

A lifeboat station was established at Mablethorpe by the Royal National Lifeboat Institution (RNLI) in 1883, operating until its closure in 1920. The RNLI established an Inshore lifeboat station at Mablethorpe in 1965.

The station currently operates a B-class (Atlantic 85) Inshore lifeboat, Jacqueline Saville (B-887), on station since 2015, and the smaller D-class (IB1) Inshore lifeboat, Stanley Whiteley Chadwick (D-790), also on station since 2015.

== History ==
In 1829, the Lincolnshire Coast Shipwreck Association (LCSA) opened Theddlethorpe Lifeboat Station, located near the village of Theddlethorpe St Helen. Management of the LCSA lifeboats stations was transferred to the RNLI in 1864. However, with launching proving increasing difficult at that location, and with too few crew available, Theddlethorpe lifeboat station was closed in 1882, and a replacement station was established about 3 miles (4.8 km) to the south at Mablethorpe in 1883.

At a meeting of the RNLI committee of management on Thursday 1 June 1882, it was noted that a contribution of £1000 had been received from Arthur Pemberton Heywood-Lonsdale, member of the committee, for the provision of a lifeboat, to be named Heywood. It was decided to appropriate the gift to the establishment of a new lifeboat station at Mablethorpe.

A 34-foot-long (10 m) self-righting 'Pulling and Sailing' (P&S) lifeboat, one with sails and (10) oars, was ordered from Woolfe of Shadwell, London at a cost of £363, and a boathouse with slipway, together costing £275, was constructed on the shore, approximately 1 mile (1.6 km) north of the High Street, at the end of what is now Golf Road. Coordinates:53°21′01.4″N 0°15′27.5″E

A grand celebration took place at Mablethorpe on 4 June 1883, for the opening of the new lifeboat station, with special excursion trains bringing the number of people witnessing the event to around 10,000. A procession was assembled outside the railway station, headed by four policemen and the Louth Artillery Band, and then the lifeboat, with raised masts, which was drawn on its carriage by 12 horses. The crew in their red caps were next, followed by about 100 school children, waving flags and banners. On arrival at the boathouse, a short service was followed by the naming of the boat, Heywood (ON 257), by Miss Loft of Trusthorpe Hall, after which the lifeboat was launched on demonstration, to the approval of the watching crowd.

A new lifeboat station was built in 1900, much closer to the centre of Mablethorpe, on Victoria Road. The new building cost £700, but was offset £50 by selling the old one.

In 1907, helper Thomas Short was run over by the lifeboat carriage, and lost his leg as a result. The committee of management voted £220 to his dependants.

A shortage of volunteers for the crew during the First World War resulted in the lifeboat station being temporarily closed in 1917. On Friday 18 June 1920, the decision was taken to make the temporary closure permanent.

During the course of 34 years of operation, Mablethorpe lifeboats had launched 30 times, saving 19 lives. The lifeboat on station at the time of closure, John Rowson Lingard (ON 542), was transferred first to the relief fleet, and later served at Blackpool. The lifeboat station became a community facility and is now home to the Mabelthorpe 'Men's shed'.

== 1960s ==
In 1962, the number of rescues or attempted rescues by All-weather lifeboats in the summer months was 98, with the number of lives rescued being 133. In 1963, in response to an increasing amount of water-based leisure activity, the RNLI began trials of small fast Inshore lifeboats, placed at various locations around the country. These were easily launched with just a few people, ideal to respond quickly to local emergencies. This quickly proved to be very successful. In 1963, there were 226 rescues or attempted rescues in the summer months, as a result of which 225 lives were saved.

More stations were opened, and in May 1965, Mablethorpe Lifeboat Station was re-established as an Inshore lifeboat station, with the arrival of a D-class (RFD PB16) Inshore lifeboat, the unnamed (D-61). In 2001, the larger B-class (Atlantic 75) was additionally placed at Mablethorpe.

With new Inshore boats of each class arriving on service in 2015, a joint naming ceremony was held on Saturday 11 June 2016. Miss Pamela Jacqueline Saville of Cambridge had been a lifelong RNLI supporter and life governor, inspired by the RNLI rescue of her father, a captain in the Merchant Navy. Her substantial legacy funded the B-class (Atlantic 85), which was named Jacqueline Saville (B-887). The D-class (IB1) was funded from the legacy of Mrs Marian Chadwick of Yorkshire, who died in 2006. Her bequest for a lifeboat on the east coast was in memory of her husband, who had admired the work of the RNLI when he served in the Royal Navy, and the lifeboat was duly named Stanley Whiteley Chadwick (D-790).

== Awards ==
On 12 April 1998, Easter Sunday, the 17 ft (5.2 m) fishing boat Lark broke down and was being driven towards the shore by a Force 6/7 gale, after its anchor broke. The D-class (EA16) lifeboat Patrick Rex Moren (D-506) was launched, and after arriving with the vessel, Helm Freeman decided it was too risky to try and take anyone off the boat. Despite the rough conditions, working at the capability limits of the lifeboat, they managed to tow the fishing boat away from the surf to safer conditions, where the crew were picked up by the Humber lifeboat, and the fishing boat towed to Grimsby. Helm Thomas Freeman was awarded the RNLI Bronze Medal, and the Maud Smith Award 1998, for making the rescue in such extreme weather for a small ILB.

The three crew of the lifeboat who rescued two swimmers in difficulty on 6 August 1975 received 'The Thanks of the Institution inscribed on Vellum'. 'Framed Letters of Thanks from the Chairman of the Institution' were given in 1980, to the lifeboat crew and shore helpers who managed to launch through heavy surf, to save three people whose boat had engine trouble. Similar framed letters were presented to the lifeboat crew who rescued two injured people and a third person, from a barge on 12 October 1982.

The following are awards made at Mablethorpe:

- The Thanks of the Institution inscribed on Vellum
  Bernard Tuplin, Helm – 1975
  John Mayfield, crew member – 1975
  Michael Westfield, crew member – 1975
- A Collective Framed Letter of Thanks signed by the Chairman of the Institution
  Crew and Helpers – 1980
- A Framed Letter of Thanks, signed by the Chairman of the Institution
  William Tuplin, Helm – 1982
  John Mayfield, crew member – 1982
  Wayne Docking, crew member – 1982
- RNLI Bronze Medal
  Thomas Freeman, Helm – 1998
- The Maud Smith Award 1998
  (for the bravest act of lifesaving during the year by a member of a lifeboat crew)
  Thomas Freeman, Helm – 1998

== Mablethorpe lifeboats ==
=== Pulling and Sailing (P&S) lifeboats ===
On station	ON (Note: ON is the RNLI's Official Number of the boat.)	Name	Built	Class	Comments
1883–1905	257	Heywood	1882	34-foot Self-righting (P&S)	(Note: 34 ft 0 in (10.36 m) x 8 ft 3 in (2.51 m) (10-oared) self-righting (P&S) lifeboat, gift of Mr A. P. Heywood Lonsdale of London, built by Woolfe of Shadwell, London, costing £363.); Sold in 1905 and broken up.
1905–1920	542	John Rowson Lingard	1905	36-foot Liverpool (P&S)	(Note: 36 ft 0 in (10.97 m) x 9 ft 0 in (2.74 m) (12-oared) Liverpool-class non-self-righting (P&S) lifeboat, gift of Mrs M. C. Lingard of St Leonards-on-Sea, built by Thames Ironworks of Blackwall, London, costing £988.); Withdrawn from Blackpool in 1937. Stored for restoration in Migennes, France, December 2024.

=== Inshore lifeboats ===
==== D-class ====
On station	Op. No. (Note: Op. No. is the RNLI's Operational Number of the boat carried on the hull.)	Name	Built	Class	Comments
1965	D-61	Unnamed	1965	D-class (RFD PB16)	
1965–1966	D-67	Unnamed	1965	D-class (RFD PB16)	
1967–1976	D-114	Unnamed	1967	D-class (RFD PB16)	
1976–1987	D-247	Unnamed	1976	D-class (Zodiac III)	
1988–1996	D-357	Braemar	1988	D-class (EA16)	
1996–2005	D-506	Patrick Rex Moren	1996	D-class (EA16)	
2005–2015	D-653	Wiliam Hadley	2005	D-class (IB1)	
2015–	D-790	Stanley Whiteley Chadwick	2015	D-class (IB1)	

==== B-class ====
On station	Op. No.	Name	Built	Class	Comments
2001–2002	B-754	Pride of Sherwood	1999	B-class (Atlantic 75)	
2002–2015	B-778	Joan Mary	2002	B-class (Atlantic 75)	
2015–	B-887	Jacqueline Saville	2015	B-class (Atlantic 85)	

=== Launch and recovery tractors ===
On station	Op. No.	Reg. No.	Type	Comments
2001–2010	TW51Hb	X651 BUJ	Talus MB-4H Hydrostatic (Mk1.5)	
2010–2025	TW16Hb	H610 SUJ	Talus MB-4H Hydrostatic (Mk1.5)	
2025–	TW28H	N671 UAW	Talus MB-4H Hydrostatic (Mk3)	

== See also ==
- List of RNLI stations
- List of former RNLI stations
- Royal National Lifeboat Institution lifeboats
