= Penarth Lifeboat Station =

RNLI lifeboat station in Vale of Glamorgan, Wales

- Gorsaf Bad Achub Penarth

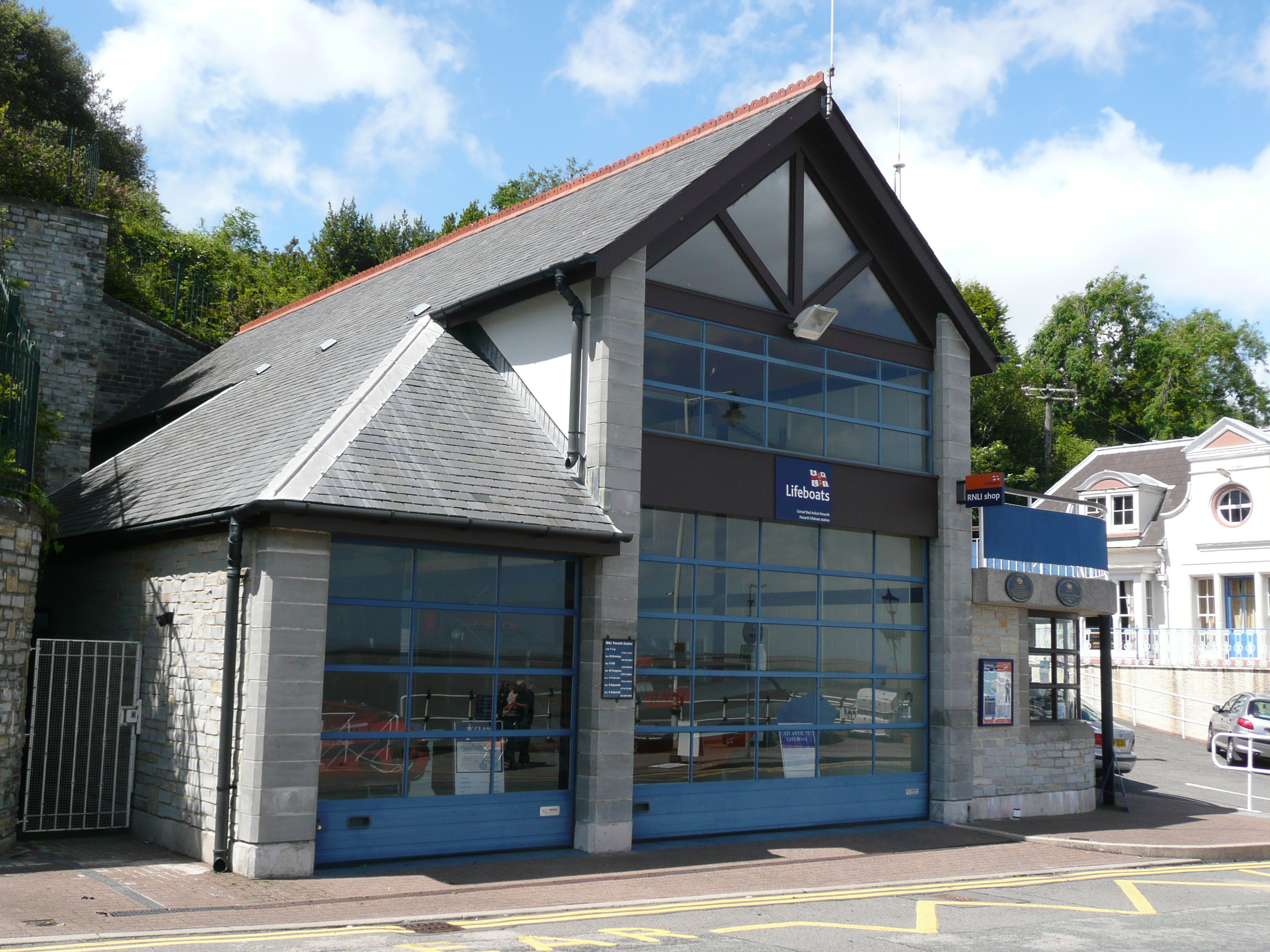
- Penarth Lifeboat Station

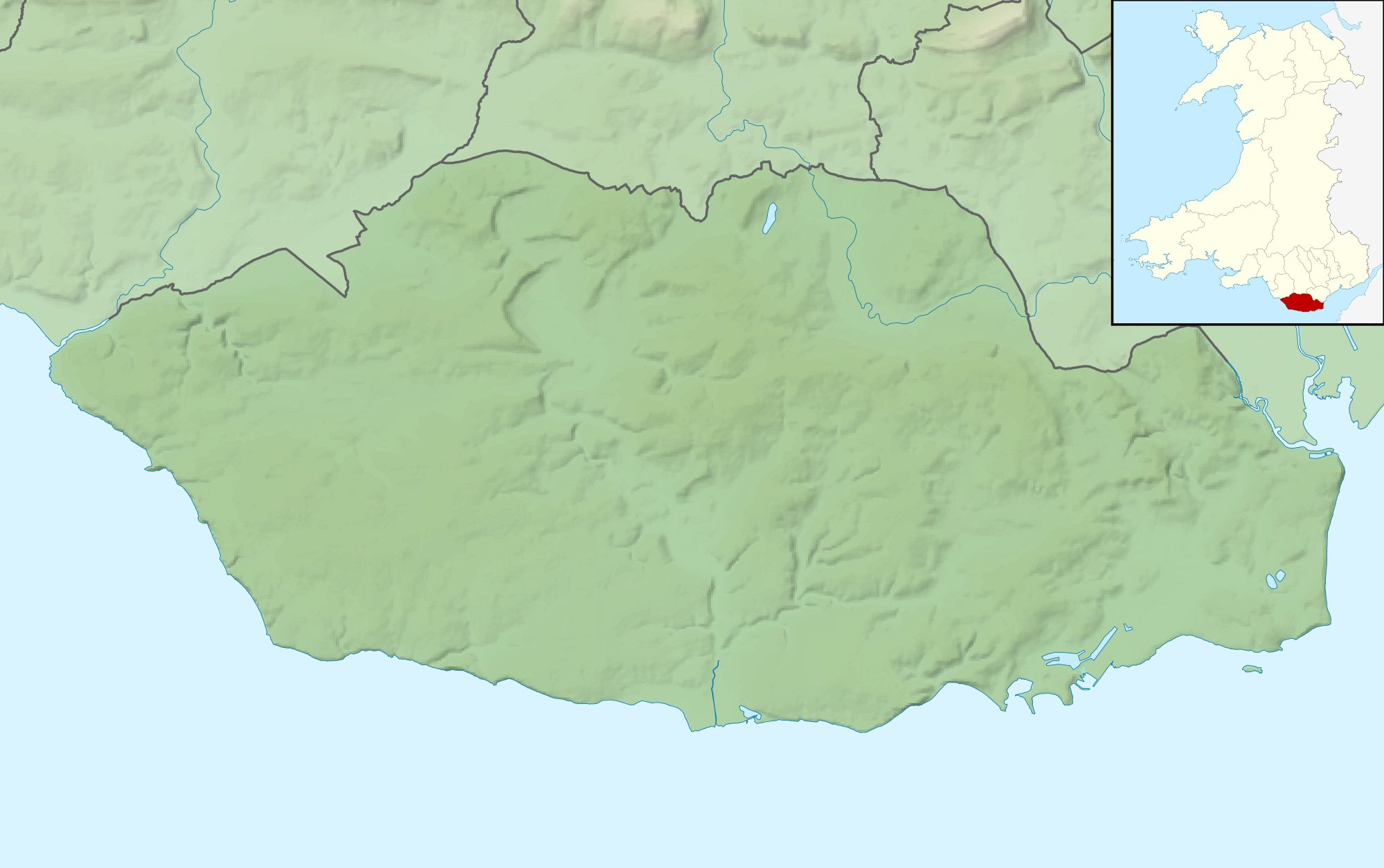
- Location within Vale of Glamorgan

General information
- Type: RNLI Lifeboat Station
- Location: The Esplanade, Penarth, Vale of Glamorgan, Wales, CF64 3AU, United Kingdom
- Coordinates: 51°25′57″N 3°10′08″W
- Opened: 1861–1905; 1980–present (ILB)
- Owner: Royal National Lifeboat Institution

Website
- Penarth RNLI Lifeboat Station

Penarth Lifeboat Station (Welsh: Gorsaf Bad Achub Penarth) is located on the Esplanade in Penarth, a town and seaside resort on the north coast of the Bristol Channel, approximately 4 miles (6.4 km) south of Cardiff, in the county of Vale of Glamorgan, Wales.

A lifeboat was first stationed at Penarth by the Royal National Lifeboat Institution in 1861. The station was closed in 1905, with services transferred to other local stations until 1980, when the station reopened on Penarth seafront with an Inshore lifeboat.

The station currently operates an Atlantic 85-class Inshore lifeboat, (B-839) Maureen Lilian (B-839), on station since 2010, and a D-class (IB1) Inshore lifeboat, Spirit of Penarth II (D-822), on station since 2018.

== History ==
The Bristol Channel has always been a hazardous stretch of water because of the extreme tidal range. There are very strong currents or rips close inshore, with speeds that exceed 7 knots (13 km/h), for several hours at each tide. The rise and fall of the tides at Penarth are the second highest recorded anywhere in the world.

At a meeting of the RNLI committee of management on Thursday, 6 September 1860, a letter of 13 August was read, from James B. Bryan, Chief Officer of H.M. Coastguard Penarth, requesting that a lifeboat be placed at Penarth, which would receive good county support. Another letter, of 7 August 1860, had been received from Mr George Gay, an architect and builder, of Cotham Park, Bristol, who wished to present the Institution with £180 for the purchase of a lifeboat, and £20 as a donation. It was agreed that a lifeboat would be provided to Penarth, with the gift appropriated to the station.

A 30-foot self-righting 'Pulling and Sailing' (P&S) lifeboat, one with sails and (10) oars, was sent to Penarth in January 1861, and named George Gay after the donor.

The lifeboat was housed in a shed, built near to where Penarth Yacht Club now stands, at the southern end of Penarth beach, and controlled by staff located at the Coastguard cottages and Trinity House lookout tower on Tower Hill near Marine Parade.

The manually powered (rowing) or "pulling boats" were 30 feet in length and were powered by 12 oars. They had cork in their hull and shaped air-cases fore and aft. The boats were self-righting and their double-ended designs could operate a rudder from either end, so there was no need to turn.

The Penarth lifeboat was renamed Baroness Windsor in 1865, remaining so named until the lifeboat was found to be completely rotten in 1868, and replaced. The new boat, a 32-foot self-righting lifeboat, was again named George Gay.

In 1883, when the Yacht Club and the raised concrete esplanade were constructed along Penarth seafront, an All-weather lifeboat was relocated to a yard and temporary slipway near the Taff Vale Railway Marine Hotel on the Dock Beach, where it remained until 1905.

The Penarth lifeboat was withdrawn from service in 1905 and all services transferred to the new Barry Dock Lifeboat Station, and the station at Weston-super-Mare. The lifeboat on station at the time of closure, Joseph Denman (ON 295), was transferred to Fishguard. Penarth would have no lifeboat service for the next 75 years, until a new ILB station opened in 1980.

=== Some historic rescues by the Penarth lifeboat ===
Date of incident	Vessel in distress	Penarth Lifeboat	Details
18 November 1864	Far West	George Gay	The Penarth lifeboat was towed by the paddle tug Marquis to the English and Welsh grounds near the mouth of the River Usk, where the full-rigger Far West of Newport was aground with 22 crewmen, having lost her anchors, hawsers and windlass off Lundy. The Penarth lifeboatmen were put aboard, her anchors recovered and she was eventually re-floated, before being towed to Bristol for repairs.
17 November 1867	Marie	Baroness Windsor	The brig Marie from Griefswald, Prussia lost her anchor and cables and was driven up the Bristol Channel and into shallow waters by high winds, after rescue attempts by three tugs and two pilot skiffs failed. After ten hours of rowing, the Penarth lifeboat managed to manoeuvre under her lee and rescued all 11 sailors. The lifeboat crew were as exhausted as the rescued seamen and suffering from exposure.
1 November 1872	Jernbyrd	George Gay (II)	The Norwegian barque Jernbyrd and the Magna Charta from Halifax, Nova Scotia, collided during a heavy gale in Penarth Roads. The Canadian ship freed herself but the Norwegian vessel was holed below the water line and the Penarth lifeboat launched to assist. The Norwegian captain asked the lifeboat to stand by while his crew attempted repairs; they stayed alongside all night until dawn when the ship was towed to Cardiff for repairs.
8 December 1872	Eleanor	George Gay (II)	During a bad storm the brig Wallace rolled over and sank with all hands and a Nova Scotian barque also sank with its full crew. The Penarth lifeboat launched to assist the Eleanor of Quebec that had gone aground on Cardiff Sands. They rescued five crew members but the ship’s mate refused to leave his vessel. The following day the lifeboat rowed out twice with crew members who re-boarded and were able to re-float her and sail to Cardiff.
7 March 1877	Crocodile	Joseph Denman	The Penarth lifeboat launched to assist the brig Crocodile from Dartmouth, that had gone aground on Cardiff Sands in high winds. The brig was re-floated on the flood tide and continued its journey to Cardiff docks.
14 October 1881	Febo	Joseph Denman	The barque Febo from Genoa was driven up the Bristol Channel by a stiff gale until she was off Penarth Roads in poor shape, her fore and main masts broken at deck level and her anchors lost. The Penarth lifeboat launched and put several lifeboat men on board to jury-rig temporary sails. The vessel was taken in tow by a tugboat and the lifeboat took 14 crew members to the shore.
27 January 1884	Juan de la Vega	Joseph Denman	The Spanish brigantine was bound for Cardiff with a heavy cargo of pit-props and found itself in difficulty off Lavernock Head. The lifeboat men from Penarth repaired the rigging and commenced pumping her out while she was towed to Cardiff dock by a tug.

== 1980s onwards ==
With the regular daily hovercraft service between Penarth to Weston-super-Mare, coupled with an increase in leisure boating generated by a new water skiing club, it was decided in 1980 to re-establish lifeboat services at Penarth, with the provision of an inflatable D-class Inshore lifeboat. The new boat was located at the original site next to Penarth Yacht Club, housed in an unused storehouse and launched down the yacht club’s jetty.

The current boathouse was built in 1995 to house a B-class lifeboat. Also provided were a Talus MB-4H amphibious tractor, a workshop, an RNLI souvenir shop, a fuel store and improved crew facilities. The following year a B-class (Atlantic 21) lifeboat arrived, for a temporary duty at the station. That boat was replaced four months later by the Atlantic 75-class Spirit of Penarth (B-725) and the D-class (EA16) Severn Rescuer (D-534). The D-class lifeboat is launched using a TC45 tractor and carriage.

In 2010 Spirit of Penarth (B-725) was withdrawn from service, and replaced with the Atlantic 85-class Maureen Lilian (B-839).

== Station honours ==
The following are awards made at Penarth:

- RNLI Gold Medal
  For the rescue of three men from the Mosquito-class yacht Firefly, 16 June 1907
  Daniel Rees, Solicitor – 1907
- RNLI Silver Medal
  For the rescue of three men from the Mosquito-class yacht Firefly, 16 June 1907
  Ivor Rees, Engineer – 1907
- 'The Thanks of the Institute inscribed on Vellum'
  For the rescue of a yacht close to Lavernock Point on 2 May 2011.
  Jason Dunlop, Helm – 2012
  Aran Pitter, crew member – 2012
- 'A Framed Letter of Thanks signed by the Chairman of the Institution'
  For rescuing a man cut off by the tide on 25 May 2002.
  Simeon Rabaiotti, Helm – 2002

== Roll of honour ==
In memory of those lost whilst serving Penarth lifeboat.

- Lost whilst attempting to rescue a man, who had gone overboard from his own boat, in high winds and rough seas, 11 November 1891
  John Charles Frederick Jackson, lifeboat man (53)
  Mr Redmond

== Penarth lifeboats ==
=== Pulling and Sailing (P&S) lifeboats ===
ON (Note: ON is the RNLI's Official Number of the boat.)	Name	Built	On station	Class	Comments
Pre-371	George Gay	1860	1861–1865	30-foot Peake self-righting (P&S)	(Note: 30 ft 0 in (9.14 m) x 7 ft 0 in (2.13 m) (6-oared) Peake-class self-righting (P&S) lifeboat, gift of Mr George Gay of Bristol, built by Forrestt of Limehouse, London, costing £157.); Renamed Baroness Windsor in 1865.
Pre-371	Baroness Windsor	1860	1865–1868	30-foot Peake self-righting (P&S)	Sold in 1868 (decayed).
Pre-516	George Gay	1868	1868–1875	32-foot Prowse self-righting (P&S)	(Note: 32 ft 0 in (9.75 m) x 7 ft 6 in (2.29 m) (10-oared) Prowse-class self-righting (P&S) lifeboat, gift of Mr George Gay of Bristol, built by Woolfe of Shadwell, London, costing £247.); Transferred to Ferryside RNLI
Pre-601	Joseph Denman	1875	1875–1881	30-foot Montrose self-righting (P&S)	(Note: 30 ft 0 in (9.14 m) x 8 ft 0 in (2.44 m) (8-oared) Montrose-class self-righting (P&S) lifeboat, gift of Hon. Mrs Denman of London, built by Woolfe of Shadwell, London, costing £275.); Returned to London in 1881.
239	Joseph Denman	1881	1881–1897	37-foot self-righting (P&S)	(Note: 37 ft 0 in (11.28 m) x 8 ft 0 in (2.44 m) (12-oared) self-righting (P&S) lifeboat, gift of Hon. Mrs Denman of London, built by Woolfe of Shadwell, London, costing £392.); Broken up in 1897.
295	Joseph Denman	1890	1897–1905	37-foot Self-Righting (P&S)	(Note: 37 ft 0 in (11.28 m) x 8 ft 0 in (2.44 m) (12-oared) self-righting (P&S) lifeboat, gift of Hon. Mrs Denman of London, built by Watkins of Blackwall, London, costing £545 when new.); Previously T. P. Hearne at Ballycotton. Transferred to Fishguard.

Station closed in 1905
Pre ON numbers are unofficial numbers used by the Lifeboat Enthusiasts' Society to reference early lifeboats not included on the official RNLI list.

=== Inshore lifeboats ===
==== D class ====
Op.No. (Note: Op. No. is the RNLI's Operational Number of the boat carried on the hull.)	Name	On station	Class	Comments
D-120	Unnamed	1980–1981	D-class (RFD PB16)	
D-279	Unnamed	1981–1989	D-class (Zodiac III)	
D-384	John Cresswell	1989–1998	D-class (EA16)	
D-534	Severn Rescuer	1998–2008	D-class (EA16)	
D-692	Connie Dains	2008–2018	D-class (IB1)	
D-822	Spirit of Penarth II	2018–	D-class (IB1)	

==== B class ====
Op.No.	Name	On station	Class	Comments
B-515	Vee Webber	1996	B-class (Atlantic 21)	Previously Blue Peter II at Beaumaris
B-725	Spirit of Penarth	1996–2010	B-class (Atlantic 75)	
B-839	Maureen Lilian	2010–	B-class (Atlantic 85)	

=== Launch and recovery tractors ===
Op. No.	Reg. No.	Type	On station	Comments
TW27Hc	M741 RUX	Talus MB-4H Hydrostatic (Mk2)	1996–2006	
TW26Hc	M423 OAW	Talus MB-4H Hydrostatic (Mk2)	2006–2021	
TA87	WA58 LHG	New Holland B3045	2009–2023	
TW60Hc	DX54 UYM	Talus MB-4H Hydrostatic (Mk2)	2021–	
TA140	WJ72 TFX	New Holland Boomer 50	2023–	

== See also ==
- List of RNLI stations
- List of former RNLI stations
- Royal National Lifeboat Institution lifeboats
- Talus Atlantic 85 DO-DO launch carriage
