= Newbiggin Lifeboat Station =

RNLI lifeboat station in Northumberland, England

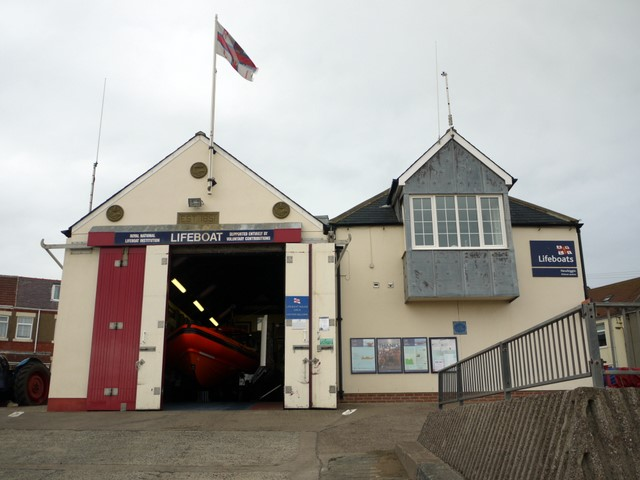
- Newbiggin Lifeboat Station

- Location within Northumberland

General information
- Type: RNLI Lifeboat Station
- Location: Sandridge, Newbiggin-by-the-Sea, Northumberland, NE64 6DX, England
- Coordinates: 55°11′09.4″N 1°30′23.7″W
- Opened: 1851
- Owner: Royal National Lifeboat Institution

Website
- Newbiggin RNLI Lifeboat Station

Newbiggin Lifeboat Station is located at Sandridge (street), in the seaside town and fishing port of Newbiggin-by-the-Sea, on the east coast of the county of Northumberland.

A lifeboat station was established at Newbiggin in 1851, by The Duke of Northumberland. Management of the station was transferred to the Royal National Institution for the Preservation of Life from Shipwreck (RNIPLS) in 1852, becoming the Royal National Lifeboat Institution (RNLI) in 1854.

The station currently operates the B-class (Atlantic 85) Inshore lifeboat Richard Wake Burdon (B-864), on station since 2012.

== History ==
On the 22 March 1851, the fishing cobles of Newbiggin set out for a days work. Caught by a sudden storm, four boats were capsized, and 14 men drowned. For their gallantry and rescue efforts, resulting in the saving of two lives, five fishermen from Newbiggin were each awarded the Silver Medal from the RNIPLS.

The Duke of Northumberland, the driving force of the Newcastle Shipwreck Association, and soon to be president of the RNIPLS, ordered and funded a lifeboat house to be constructed on the shore at Newbiggin. In 1852, a 30-foot self-righting 'Pulling and Sailing' (P&S) lifeboat, one with sails and (10) oars, was named Latimer, was placed at the station by the RNIPLS, with them taking on management of the station.

The lifeboat Latimer was launched on 7 January 1854, to the aid of the vessel Embla of Norway, on passage from Setúbal, Portugal to Stavanger, when she wrecked off the coast of Northumberland. All 13 men aboard the Embla were lost. The lifeboat had launched without a full crew, and despite their best efforts, failed to reach the wreck. In recognition of their extraordinary efforts, Coxswain Philip Jefferson, one of the five fishermen recognised in 1851, was awarded a second-service clasp to his silver medal.

Coxswain John Brown was awarded the RNLI Silver Medal, for the service to the steamship Northumberland, which ran aground in a severe gale on 14 October 1881. The lifeboat William Hopkinson of Brighouse rescued her crew of four.

In January 1927, the 37-foot Newbiggin lifeboat Ada Lewis (ON 566) was called to the Newbiggin fishing fleet. With most of the usual crew out fishing, the boat was manned with miners, who had just finished a shift at the local colliery. The boat would not have got away, without the extraordinary efforts of the 25 local women helpers, who ended up waist deep in water. They were collectively accorded 'The Thanks of the Institution inscribed on Vellum'.

It was decided to withdraw the All-weather lifeboat in 1981. The boathouse was modified to accommodate a new B-class (Atlantic 21) lifeboat along with the Talus MB-764 amphibious tractor, and improved crew facilities were provided with the constructed of an extension. Oakley-class lifeboat 37-17 Mary Joicey (ON 984) was withdrawn on 26 February 1981, with the relief B-class (Atlantic 21) lifeboat Co-Operative No.1 (B-511) temporarily assigned to the station on 15 March 1981. The stations permanent lifeboat, Atlantic 21-class Kirklees (B-553) arrived in 1982.

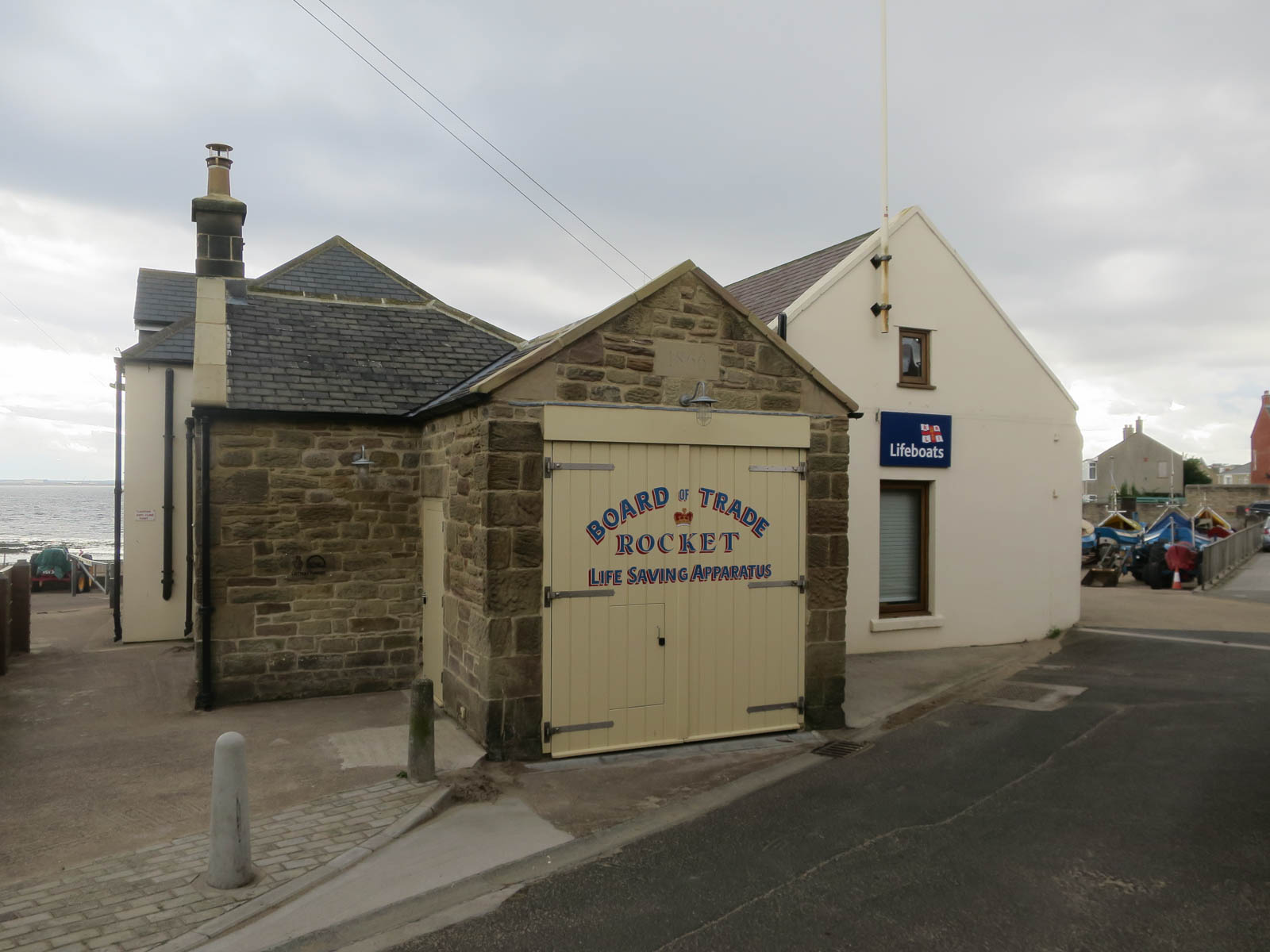
Newbiggin Rocket House

Further modifications to the boathouse were required to house the larger B-class (Atlantic 75). Works were completed in July 1998, and RNLB CSMA 75th Anniversary (B-745) arrived on 3 August 1998, replacing Kirklees. On 19 September 2012, the Atlantic 85-class Richard Wake Burdon (B-864) was placed on service, costing £204,000, funded by the legacy from Mr Hylton Burdon, of Wallsend, North Tyneside, and named in honour of his elder brother Richard, who was lost at sea while serving with the Royal Navy during the Second World War.

The Newbiggin Lifeboat House is the oldest boathouse still operated by the RNLI. Mention must be made of the Newbiggin Rocket House, whilst not managed by the RNLI, was constructed as an extension to the lifeboat house in 1866. In addition to lifeboats, many sea rescues were performed by the Rocket Brigade, who could effect rescues by firing rocket-powered lines to wrecks close to the shore. The Newbiggin Rocket House, was refurbished in its 150th anniversary year in 2016.

== Notable rescues ==
In a south east gale, and the extremely cold night of 4 February 1940, the 32-foot twin-engine Surf-class lifeboat Augustus and Laura (ON 810) was launched at 05:00 to the aid of the motor-vessel Eminent of Belgium, which had been forced to remain at sea, when the port at Newcastle-upon-Tyne closed due to the bad weather. The vessel had been driven ashore at Newbiggin Point. Unable to make headway, the lifeboat returned. In an extraordinary effort, 45 launchers then hauled to lifeboat overland to Newbiggin Point. The lifeboat was launched for the second time at 08:10, and all 11 crew were rescued. For their efforts, the women helpers of Newbiggin were again collectively awarded 'The Thanks of the Institution inscribed on Vellum'. Coxswain George Ralph Taylor received the RNLI Silver Medal

== Station honours ==
The following are awards made at Newbiggin

- RNIPLS Silver Medal

John Dent – 1851
Philip Jefferson – 1851
William Armstrong – 1851
Henry Brown – 1851
Robert Armstrong – 1851

- RNLI Silver Medal

Philip Jefferson, Coxswain – 1854 (Second-Service clasp)

John Brown, Coxswain – 1881

John Brown, Coxswain – 1888 (Second-Service clasp)

George Ralph Taylor, Second Coxswain – 1940

- RNLI Bronze Medal

William Robinson, Coxswain – 1926

- The Thanks of the Institution inscribed on Vellum

Watson Brown, Coxswain – 1914

The women helpers of Newbiggin – 1927

The women helpers of Newbiggin – 1940

George Dawson, Assistant Mechanic, acting coxswain – 1975

John Lisle Robinson, skipper of the fishing coble Margaret Lisle – 1975

George Dawson, Coxswain – 1976

- Vellum Service Certificates

Each member of the lifeboat crew – 1975
Each member of the crew of fishing coble Margaret Lisle – 1975

Each member of the lifeboat crew – 1976

== Roll of honour ==
In memory of those lost whilst serving Newbiggin lifeboat.

- Collapsed and died after swimming out to a fishing boat heading for the rocks, 14 July 1972

Adam Campbell Storey, Branch Chairman (48)

== Newbiggin lifeboats ==
=== Pulling and Sailing (P&S) lifeboats ===
ON (Note: ON is the RNLI's Official Number of the boat.)	Name	Built	On station	Class	Comments
Pre-256	Latimer	1852	1852−1860	30-foot Peake Self-righting (P&S)	(Note: 30-foot x 8-foot (10-oared) Peake-class self-righting (P&S) lifeboat, funded by The Duke of Northumberland, built by Forrestt of Limehouse, London, costing £130.)
Pre-380	Latimer	1860	1860−1866	34-foot 6in Peake Self-righting (P&S)	(Note: 34-foot 6in x 8-foot (10-oared) Peake-class self-righting (P&S) lifeboat, funded by The Duke of Northumberland, built by Forrestt of Limehouse, London, costing £144.)
Pre-447	William Hopkinson of Brighouse	1865	1866−1885	34-foot Self-righting (P&S)	(Note: 34-foot x 8-foot 5in (10-oared) self-righting (P&S) lifeboat, legacy of Miss Hopkinson of Brighouse, built by Woolfe of Shadwell, London, costing £300.)
3	Robert and Susan	1885	1885−1906	37-foot Self-righting (P&S)	(Note: 37-foot x 8-foot 6in (12-oared) self-righting (P&S) lifeboat, gift of Miss E. H. Jacomb-Hood of Leigh, built by Forrestt of Limehouse, London, costing £399.)
566	Ada Lewis	1906	1906−1931	37-foot Self-righting (P&S)	(Note: 37-foot x 8-foot 6in (12-oared) self-righting (P&S) lifeboat, gift of Mrs A. Lewis-Hill of London, built by Thames Ironworks of Blackwall, London, costing £979.)
619	Arthur R. Dawes	1911	1931−1938	35-foot Rubie Self-righting (P&S)	(Note: 35-foot x 8-foot 10in Dungeness-class (Rubie) self-righting (P&S) lifeboat, legacy of Mr G. R. Dawes of London, built by Thames Ironworks of Blackwall, London, costing £989 when new.); Previously Millicent at Boulmer.

Pre ON numbers are unofficial numbers used by the Lifeboat Enthusiast Society to reference early lifeboats not included on the official RNLI list.

=== Motor lifeboats ===
ON	Op. No. (Note: Op. No. is the RNLI's Operational Number of the boat carried on the hull.)	Name	Built	On station	Class	Comments
810	–	Augustus and Laura	1938	1938−1950	32-foot Surf	
875	–	Richard Ashley	1950	1950−1966	Liverpool	
984	37-17	Mary Joicey	1966	1966−1981	Oakley	

All-weather lifeboat withdrawn in 1981

=== Inshore lifeboats ===
Op. No.	Name	On station	Class	Comments
B-511	Co-Operative No.1	1981−1982	B-class (Atlantic 21)	
B-553	Kirklees	1982−1998	B-class (Atlantic 21)	
B-745	CSMA 75th Anniversary	1998−2012	B-class (Atlantic 75)	
B-864	Richard Wake Burdon	2012−	B-class (Atlantic 85)	

=== Launch and recovery tractors ===
Op. No.	Reg. No.	Type	On station	Comments
T50	KLA 84	Case LA	1949–1959	
T55	KXX 565	Case LA	1959–1965	
T73	500 GYR	Case 1000D	1965–1972	
T70	12 GXD	Case 1000D	1972–1981	
TW03	RLJ 367R	Talus MB-764 County	1981	
TW09	PEL 169W	Talus MB-764 County	1981–1992	
TW21Hc	J495 XUJ	Talus MB-4H Hydrostatic (Mk2)	1992–1998	
TW19Hc	J120 VNT	Talus MB-4H Hydrostatic (Mk2)	1998–1999	
TW21Hc	J495 XUJ	Talus MB-4H Hydrostatic (Mk2)	1999–2003	
TW20Hc	J125 WUJ	Talus MB-4H Hydrostatic (Mk2)	2003–2014	
TW59Hc	DU04 DVW	Talus MB-4H Hydrostatic (Mk2)	2014–2015	
TW22Hc	K501 AUX	Talus MB-4H Hydrostatic (Mk2)	2015–	

== See also ==
- List of RNLI stations
- List of former RNLI stations
- Royal National Lifeboat Institution lifeboats
