= Cardigan Lifeboat Station =

RNLI lifeboat station in Pembrokeshire, Wales

- Gorsaf Bad Achub Aberteifi

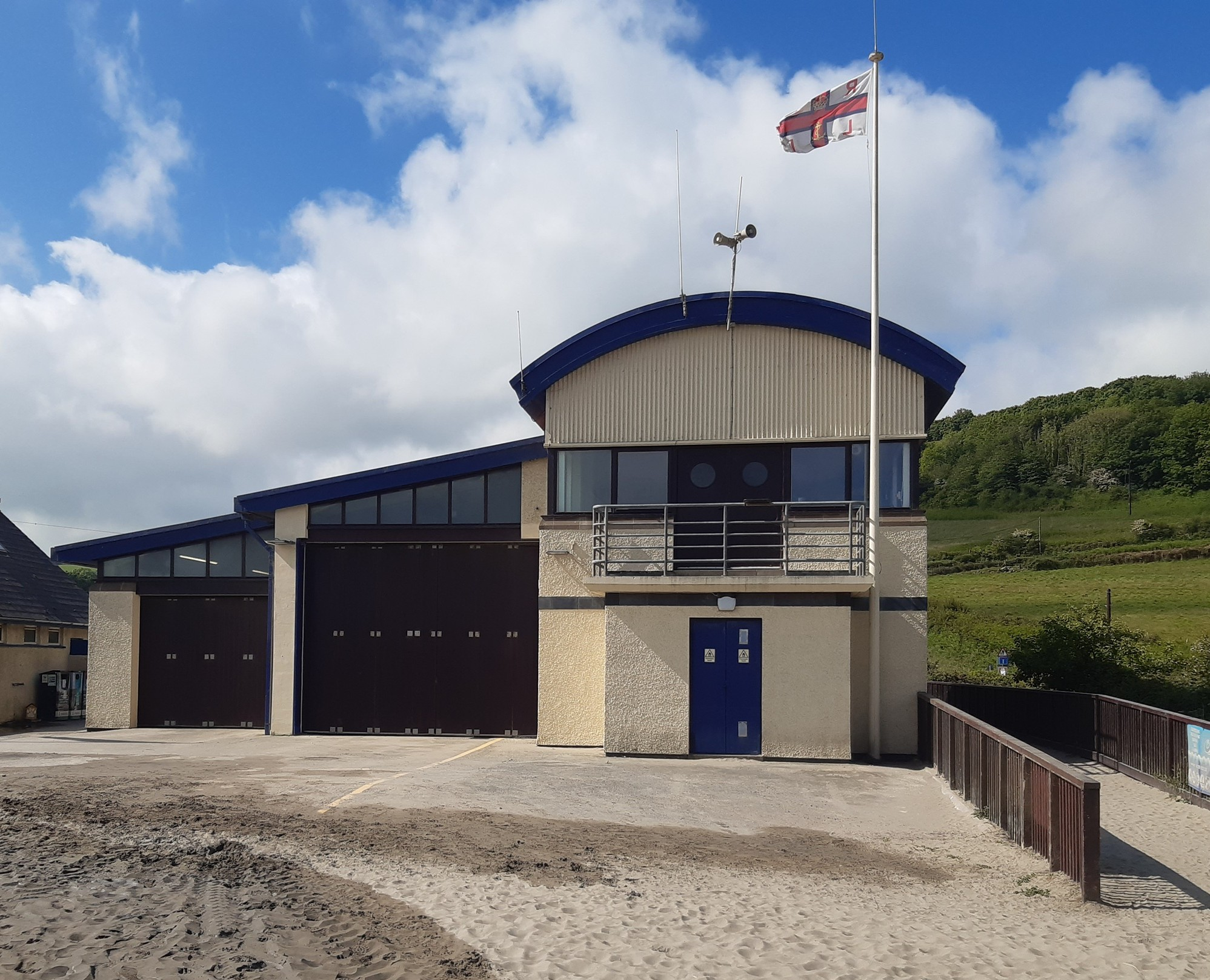
- Cardigan Lifeboat Station in 2025

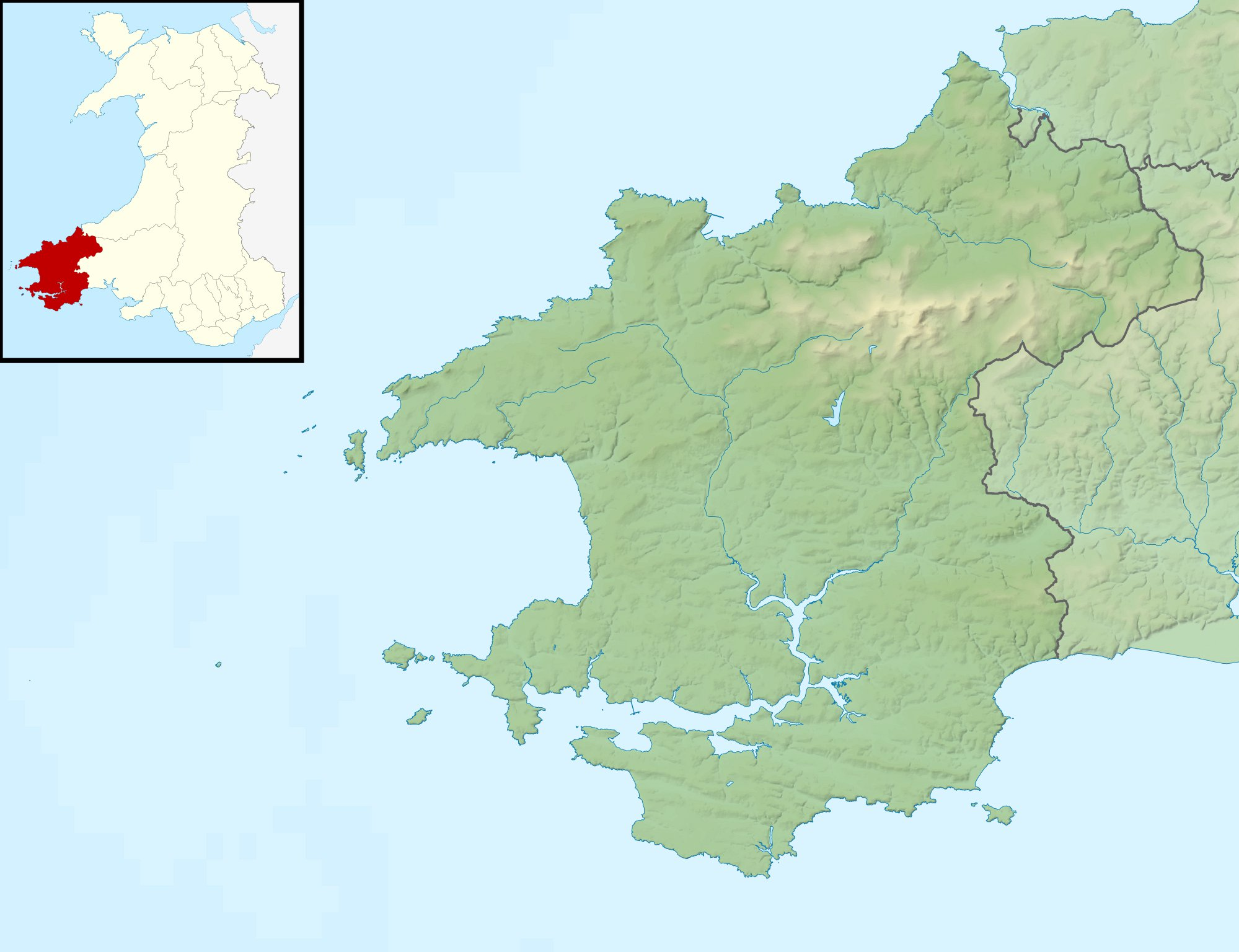
- Location within Pembrokeshire

General information
- Type: RNLI Lifeboat Station
- Location: Cardigan Lifeboat Station, Poppit Sands, Cardigan, Pembrokeshire, Wales, SA43 3LN, UK
- Coordinates: 52°06′17″N 4°41′58″W
- Opened: 1849
- Owner: Royal National Lifeboat Institution

Website
- Cardigan RNLI Lifeboat Station

Cardigan Lifeboat Station (Welsh: Gorsaf Bad Achub Aberteifi) is located at Poppit Sands, on the southern side of the River Teifi estuary in North Pembrokeshire, approximately 3 miles (4.8 km) north-west of the town of Cardigan, Wales.

A lifeboat was first placed at Cardigan in 1849. Management of the station was transferred to the Royal National Institution for the Preservation of Life from Shipwreck (RNIPLS) in 1851, which became the Royal National Lifeboat Institution (RNLI) in 1854. The station closed in 1932 but reopened in 1971 as an Inshore lifeboat station.

The station currently operates a B-class (Atlantic 85) Inshore lifeboat, Albatross (B-871), on station since 2013, and the smaller D-class (IB1) Inshore lifeboat, John Darbyshire (D-845), on station since 2019.

== History ==
The original Cardigan lifeboat station was built in 1849, on the south side of the River Teifi estuary below Penrhyn Castle, after the loss of the crew from the brig Agnes Lee. Management of the station was transferred to the RNIPLS in 1851.

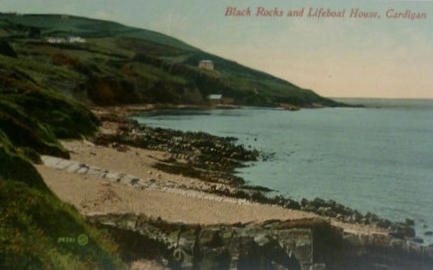
An early 20th century postcard entitled "Black Rocks and Lifeboat House" features the 1876 boathouse (centre, just above waterline).

On 21 January 1861, the schooner Dewi Wyn wrecked on the Cardigan Bar, whilst on passage from Bristol. The Cardigan lifeboat was launched, and saved all eight crew members.

The first RNLI lifeboat to be placed at Cardigan arrived in 1864. The new 32-foot (9.8 m) self-righting 'Pulling and Sailing' (P&S) lifeboat, one with sails and (10) oars, was transported to New Milford free of charge by the Great Western Railway Company. Funded by the Manchester Lifeboat Fund, through the efforts of Robert Whitworth, the boat was named John Stuart, in recognision of his donations.

In 1876 a replacement boathouse with slipway was built, the remains of which can be seen down the estuary at Black Rocks. In 1880, a small breakwater was built to protect the boathouse and launching site.

With a motor-powered lifeboat placed at Fishguard to the south, and an existing lifeboat at New Quay, the Elizabeth Austin (ON 547) was withdrawn, and the station was closed in 1932.

== Inshore Lifeboat Station ==
In 1964, in response to an increasing amount of water-based leisure activity, the RNLI placed 25 small fast Inshore lifeboats around the country. These were easily launched with just a few people, ideal to respond quickly to local emergencies.

More stations were opened, and in 1971, the popularity of this area, with increased leisure incidents and accidents, led to the decision to construct a new station on the present site.

A new boathouse, built for the new C-class lifeboat, was officially opened in 1987. In 1998 a new double boathouse was completed for the B-class and D-class lifeboats, for the Talus MB-4H launching vehicle, and it also provided improved crew facilities. Consequently, the station today houses two inshore lifeboats, which operate from the beach.

The lifeboat crew have training sessions twice a week – on Sunday mornings and Wednesday evenings; visitors to the station are welcomed at these times. The station also houses an RNLI shop, open throughout the year, volunteers permitting.

Associated with the lifeboat station is the H.M. Coastguard lookout post, part of the Maritime and Coastguard Agency Emergency Response, located on the other side of the estuary, on the cliff top at Gwbert.

In December 2011 a crew at the station – comprising Gemma Griffiths, Sarah Griffiths and Louise Francis - made history by being the first all-female volunteer lifeboat crew to respond to a callout in Wales.

== Awards ==
Five RNLI medals, three silver and two bronze, are among the various awards presented for service at Cardigan Lifeboat Station. These include:

- In 1873 Coastguard Richard Jinks received a Silver Medal for saving two crew members from the Ocean, a boat which had run aground on Cardigan Bar.
- In 1888 Coxswain William Niles received a long service Silver Medal.
- In 1901 Coxswain David Rees received a Silver Medal on his retirement.
- In 1919 A Bronze Medal was awarded to Coxswain Thomas Bowen for his part in the rescue of 10 seamen from the steam yacht Conservator
- In 1972 V Evans and R Evans received Letters of Thanks following the rescue of four people after their boat capsized on Cardigan Bar.
- In 1979 Helmsman Vernon Evans was awarded the Thanks of the Institution for saving four crew members from the yacht Snow Rych in Cardigan Bay.
- In 1980, following the saving of four people and a dog from a motor cruiser in 5m seas, Helmsman Robert Reynolds received a Bronze Medal, and Vernon Evans and Charles Sharp were awarded the Thanks of the Institution.
- In 1997 Crew Members Jeremy Thomas and Leonard Walters received the Thanks of the Institution following the rescue of three people from near Penbryn Beach, who had been cut off by the tide.
- In 2005, after saving three men cut off by the tide at Fathganeg Rock, and in very dangerous conditions, helmsman Dyfrig Brown received the Thanks of the Institution.
- In 2013 Walter and Elizabeth Groombridge Award.
- In 2013 the St David Bravery Award was given to Derek Pusey, Leonard Walters and Clive Williams for the night rescue of walkers cut off by the tide.
- In 2014 The Lady Swaythling Trophy was awarded to Helmsman Derek Pusey from the Shipwrecked Mariners' Society.
- In 2014 Crewman Clive Williams received a Commendation for bravery from the Shipwrecked Mariners' Society.
- In 2014 Helmsman Leonard Walters received a Framed letter of thanks of the Institution.

Note: The three 2014 awards were made for the same rescue

== Cardigan lifeboats ==
=== Pulling and Sailing (P&S) lifeboats ===
| ON (Note: ON is the RNLI's Official Number of the boat.) | Name | Built | On station | Class | Comments |
|---|---|---|---|---|---|
| – | Unnamed | 1848 | 1849–1850 | 24-foot Whale Boat | (Note: 24 ft 0 in (7.32 m) (8-oared) Whale-boat, built by White of Cowes.); Returned to builder as too small. |
| Pre-230 | Unnamed | 1850 | 1850–1864 | 27-foot Whale Boat (P&S) | (Note: 27 ft 0 in (8.23 m) x 7 ft 8 in (2.34 m) (8-oared) Whale-boat, built by T. & J. White of Cowes, costing £116.); Sold in 1864. |
| Pre-423 | John Stuart | 1864 | 1864–1883 | 32-foot self-righting (P&S) | (Note: 32 ft 0 in (9.75 m) x 7 ft 4 in (2.24 m) (10-oared) self-righting (P&S) lifeboat, funded by the Manchester LB fund, built by Forrestt of Limehouse, London, costing £198.) returned to London in 1883. |
| 177 | Lizzie and Charles Leigh Clare | 1882 | 1883–1905 | 34-foot self-righting (P&S) | (Note: 34 ft 0 in (10.36 m) x 8 ft 0 in (2.44 m) (10-oared) self-righting (P&S) lifeboat, gift of Mrs Leigh Clare of Broughton, built by Woolfe of Shadwell, London, costing £363.); Sold in January 1906. |
| 547 | Elizabeth Austin | 1905 | 1905–1932 | 35-foot Liverpool (P&S) | (Note: 35 ft 0 in (10.67 m) x 8 ft 6 in (2.59 m) (10-oared) Liverpool-class non-self-righting (P&S) lifeboat, legacy of Miss S. Austin of Tottenham, built by Thames Ironworks of Blackwall, London, costing £847.); Sold in 1932. |

Station Closed in 1932
Pre ON numbers are unofficial numbers used by the Lifeboat Enthusiasts' Society to reference early lifeboats not included on the official RNLI list.

=== Inshore lifeboats ===
==== C class & D class ====
| Op.No. (Note: Op. No. is the RNLI's Operational Number of the boat carried on the hull.) | Name | On station | Class | Comments |
|---|---|---|---|---|
| D-194 | Unnamed | 1971–1987 | D-class (RFD PB16) | |
| C-518 | Unnamed | 1987–1997 | C-class (Zodiac Grand Raid IV) | Holed and sunk October 1993(was repaired and returned to service) |
| D-492 | Lawnflite | 1998 | D-class (EA16) | |
| D-467 | Kathleen Scadden | 1998–1999 | D-class (EA16) | |
| D-547 | Society of Societies | 1999–2009 | D-class (EA16) | |
| D-709 | Elsie Ida Meade | 2009–2019 | D-class (IB1) | |
| D-845 | John Darbyshire | 2019– | D-class (IB1) | |

==== B-class ====
| Op No. | Name | On station | Class | Comments |
|---|---|---|---|---|
| B-752 | Tanni Grey | 1999–2013 | B-class (Atlantic 75) | |
| B-871 | Albatross | 2013– | B-class (Atlantic 85) | |

=== Launch and recovery tractors ===
| Op.No. | Reg. No. | Type | On station | Comments |
|---|---|---|---|---|
| TW02 | LRU 581P | Talus MB-764 County | 1987 | |
| TW01 | XTK 150M | Talus MB-764 County | 1987–1995 | |
| TW04 | TEL 705R | Talus MB-764 County | 1995–2002 | |
| TW52Hc | Y506 JNT | Talus MB-4H Hydrostatic (Mk2) | 2002–2011 | |
| TW51Hb | X651 BUJ | Talus MB-4H Hydrostatic (Mk1.5) | 2011–2023 | |
| TW45Ha | T249 JNT | Talus MB-4H Hydrostatic (Mk1) | 2023– | |

== Gallery ==
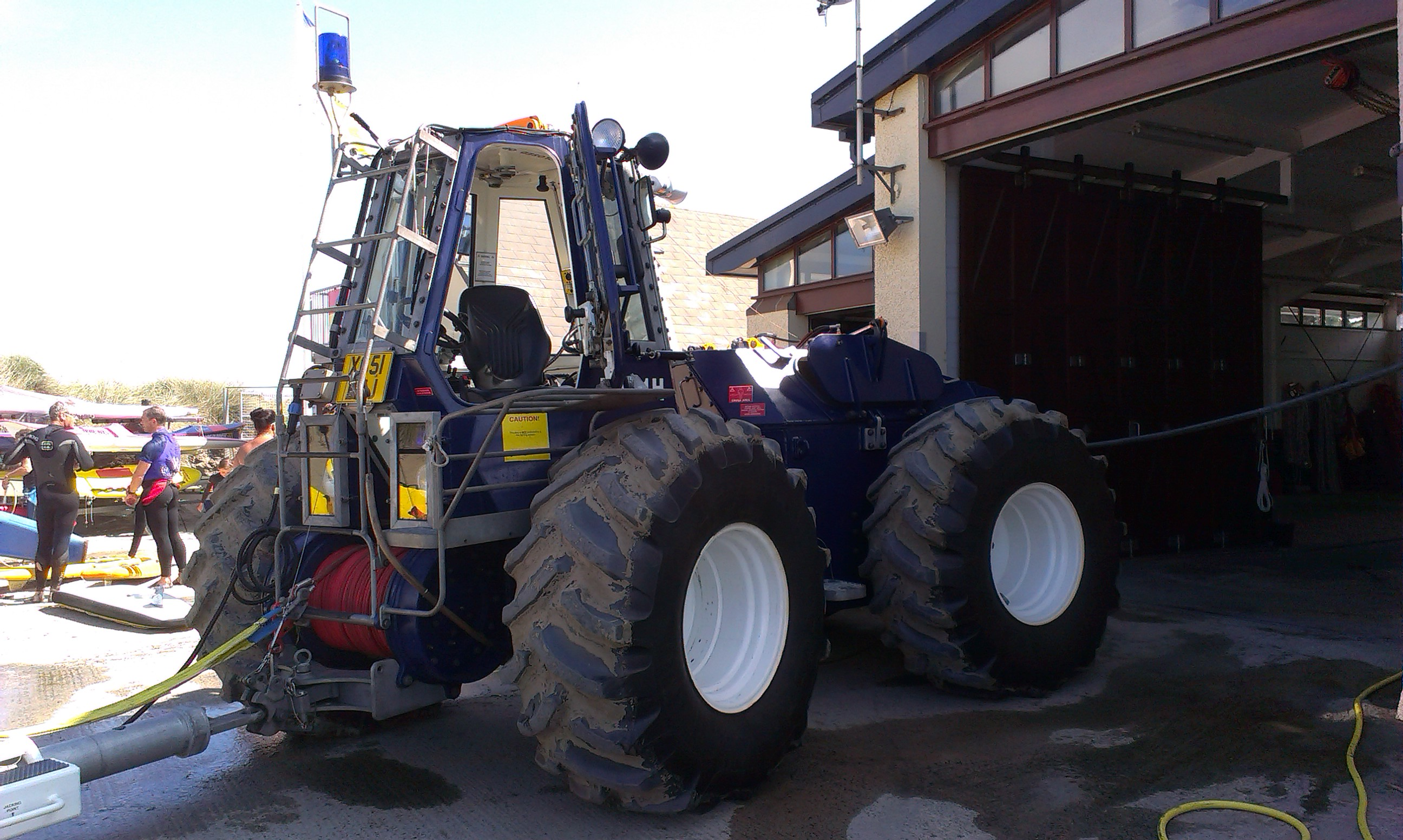
The Talus MB-4H amphibious tractor used to launch the B-class Atlantic 85 lifeboat

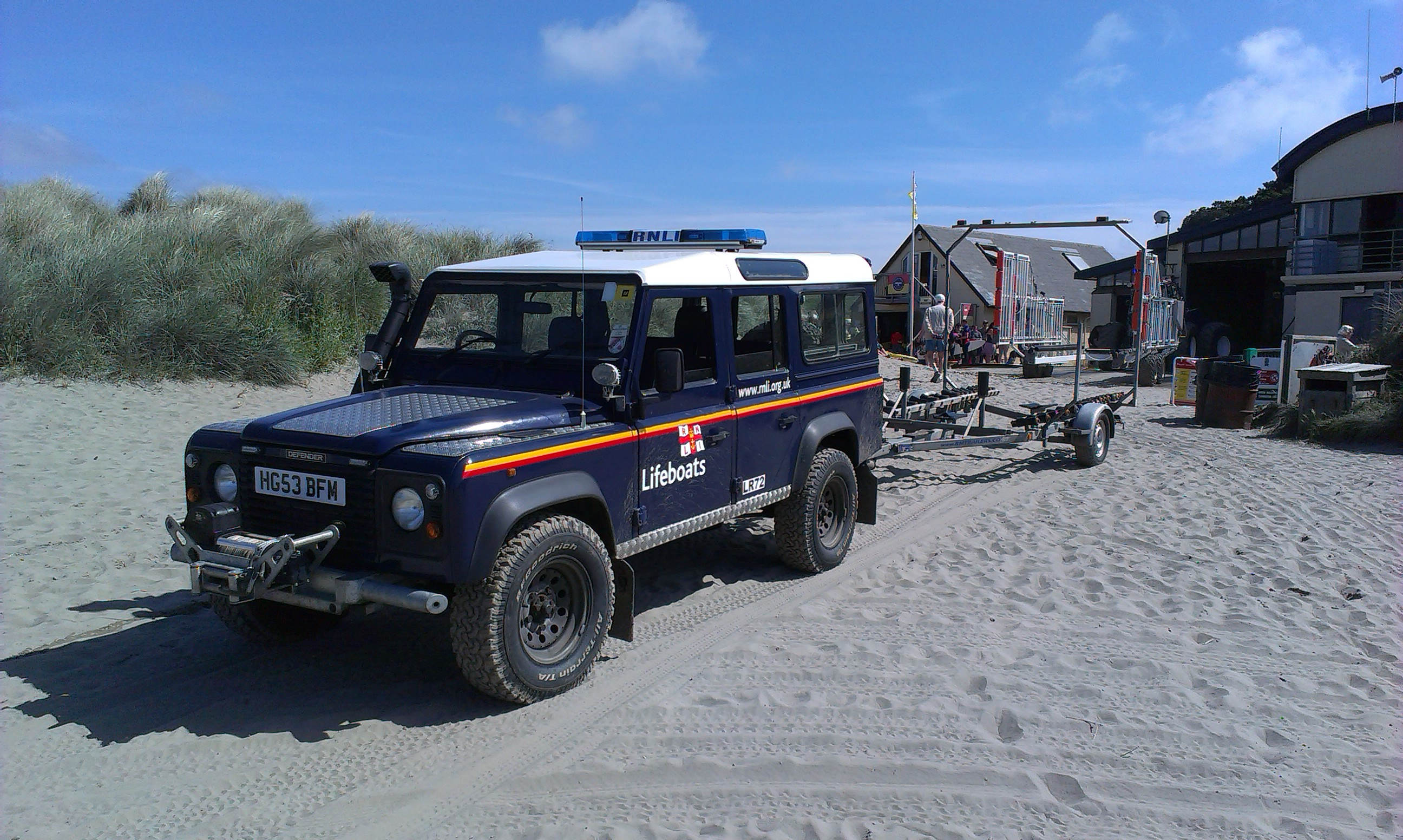
Land Rover used to transport the D-class (IB1) lifeboat

== See also ==
- List of RNLI stations
- List of former RNLI stations
- Royal National Lifeboat Institution lifeboats
- Talus Atlantic 85 DO-DO launch carriage
