= Happisburgh Lifeboat Station =

RNLI lifeboat station in Norfolk, England

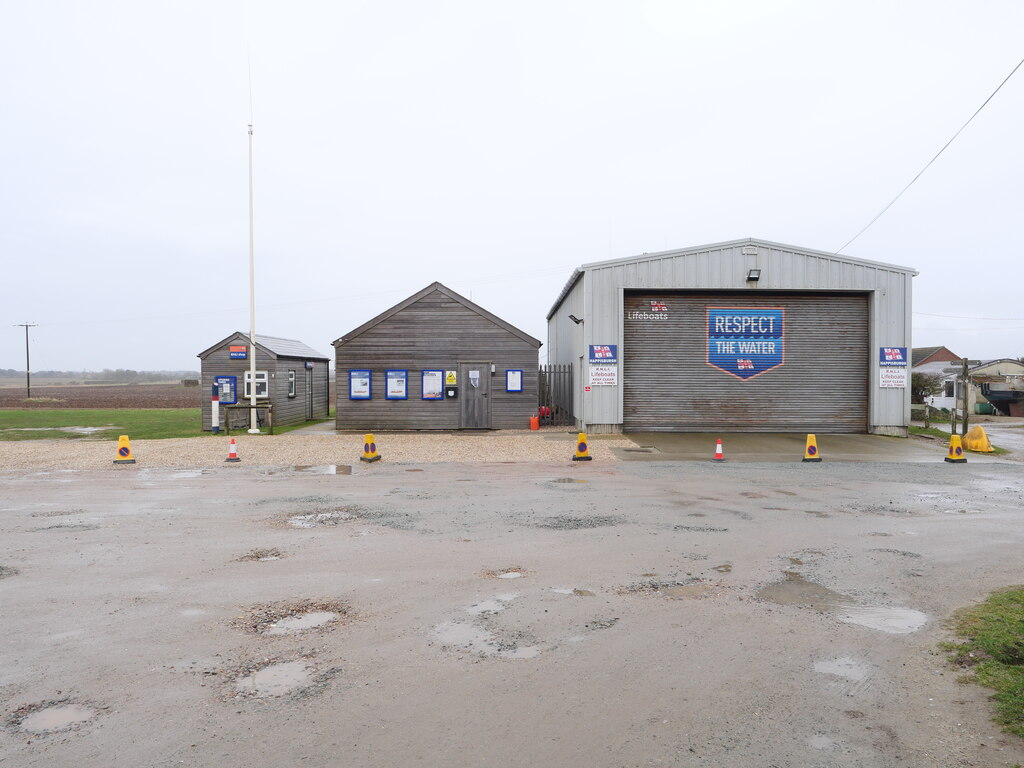
- Happisburgh Lifeboat Station

- Location within Norfolk
- Alternative names: Hasborough Lifeboat Station

General information
- Type: RNLI Lifeboat Station
- Location: Happisburgh Lifeboat Station, Cart Gap,, Happisburgh, Norfolk, NR12 OPP, England
- Coordinates: 52°48′47.8″N 1°33′22.2″E
- Opened: 1866
- Owner: Royal National Lifeboat Institution

Website
- Happisburgh RNLI Lifeboat Station

Happisburgh Lifeboat Station (/ˈheɪzbʌrə/ HAYZ-burr-ə) is located at Cart Gap, just over 1 mile (1.6 km) to the south of Happisburgh, a village approximately 18 miles (29 km) north-east of Norwich, on the east coast of Norfolk.

A lifeboat station was formally established at Happisburgh by the Royal National Lifeboat Institution (RNLI) in 1866.

The station currently operates a D-class (IB1) Inshore lifeboat, Russell Pickering (D-813), on station since 2017.

NB: In most historic RNLI documentation, the station is referred to as Hasborough.

== History ==
The offshore Haisborough Sands are located parallel to the shore near the village of Happisburgh. The sands constantly shift and change, and have always been of great danger to coastal shipping, particularly in the age of sail. Although the spelling of the village and the sandbank are different, they are pronounced the same.

Due to the hazardous seas off Happisburgh, in around 1850 local fishermen formed a company to assist in salvage and rescue. Under the law of salvage, the first rescuers to arrive at a distressed vessel could claim a reward proportionate to the value of the property saved. The men also collected for salvage any goods washed ashore.

At a meeting of the RNLI committee of management on Thursday 1 March 1866, following his visit to Happisburgh, the report of the Inspector of Lifeboats was read and approved (no details are given). At a subsequent meeting on Thursday 8 April 1866, the gift of £1000 for a lifeboat from the Huddersfield Lifeboat Fund, via Mr Thomas Cresswell, was appropriated to a new station at Happisburgh.

The RNLI journal "The Lifeboat" reported on 1 January 1867, that "The Institution has recently formed a life-boat station at Hasborough, situate between the Palling and Bacton life-boat establishments. It is a place where vessels in distress are frequently run on shore, as their masters fully expect to find a life-boat stationed at or near the light-houses, and there are many difficulties in the way of transporting either of the life-boats on the adjacent stations to this neighbourhood."

A 32-foot self-righting 'Pulling and Sailing (P&S) lifeboat, one with sails and (10) oars, was commissioned from Woolfe of Shadwell, London, at a cost of £240-8s, and a transporting carriage was supplied, at a further cost of £83-10s. A boathouse was also constructed to the east of the village, at a cost of £188-15s.

Before being transported to Happisburgh, having been funded by the people of Huddersfield, the lifeboat was sent there and placed on public exhibition. In front of a crowd of over 20,000, the lifeboat was named Huddersfield, and launched into the River Colne on demonstration. The Institution were most grateful to the London and North Western, Manchester, Sheffield and Lincolnshire, Great Northern, and Great Eastern railway companies, for transporting both boat and carriage free of charge.

In the 1870s, the company of local fishermen acquired their first lifeboat, the Friendship, at a cost of £160, paid for by subscriptions and the sale of shares. The lifeboat had a crew of 13 men. Their boathouse was located high on the cliff near the lighthouse, which made it difficult to launch the boat and return it to storage afterwards.

The launching of the lifeboat from the Happisburgh station was not an easy operation, and needed a lot of manpower and a team of eight horses, which were supplied from the local farms. Retrieving the lifeboat and hauling it back up through the gap to the boathouse was even more arduous and required ten horses.

In 1887, the RNLI sent a new larger 34-foot self-righting lifeboat to the station. Again built by Woolfe of Shadwell, a further gift of £700 was received from the Huddersfield Lifeboat Fund, and the new lifeboat was again named Huddersfield (ON 140).

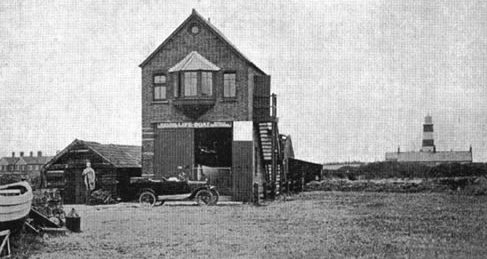
Happisburgh Lifeboat Station 1903

Very little was recorded of the arrival of the second Huddersfield lifeboat, and no service records have been found. Other than it being recorded at Happisburgh, there are no other details available of the third lifeboat placed at Happisburgh in 1906, Forester (ON 455), a 34-foot self-righting Dungeness-class (Rubie) (P&S) lifeboat. It is likely to have been at Happisburgh on relief duties, prior to the arrival of a new lifeboat in 1907.

The arrival of the fourth lifeboat to be placed at Happisburgh was a far better reported event. The station would receive a new 34-foot Dungeness-class (Rubie) self-righting (P&S) lifeboat, built by Thames Ironworks of Blackwall, London. At a ceremony at noon on 30 November 18, Sir Edward Birkbeck Bt KCVO DL accepted the lifeboat on behalf of the Institution from Mr. and Mrs. Tijou, of London, representatives of the late Samuel Vallentine of Brixton, who had bequested £1000 to the Institution, for the provision of a lifeboat on the East coast. The lifeboat was then formally handed to the care of the Happisburgh station. One of the guests of honour was 83-year-old former coxswain John Cannon. After a short service and prayers, Mrs Tijou stepped forward with a bottle of champagne, and the lifeboat was named Jacob and Rachel Vallentine (ON 580), in memory of the parents of the donor.

At a meeting of the RNLI committee of management on 21 January 1926, it was decided to close Happisburgh Lifeboat Station. The lifeboat on station at the time, Jacob and Rachel Vallentine, was transferred to Palling No.1 Lifeboat Station.

== Notable rescues ==
On 25 December 1870, the brig Minerva of Seaham was bound for Rochester with a cargo of coal, when she ran aground off Ostend near Happisburgh. Most of the beachmen were at church, but four men rowed out to the vessel in a crab boat and discovered that she was fast filling with water. The lifeboat Huddersfield was hauled north by road on her carriage to Ostend, where she was launched from the beach. The crew of the brig by now had taken to their own lifeboat but were soon taken aboard the Huddersfield. With the wind increasing and the tide against them, the lifeboat landed the men farther south down the coast at Sea Palling. With the weather still bad, the lifeboat had to be hauled back from there to its station by carriage.

== Inshore service ==
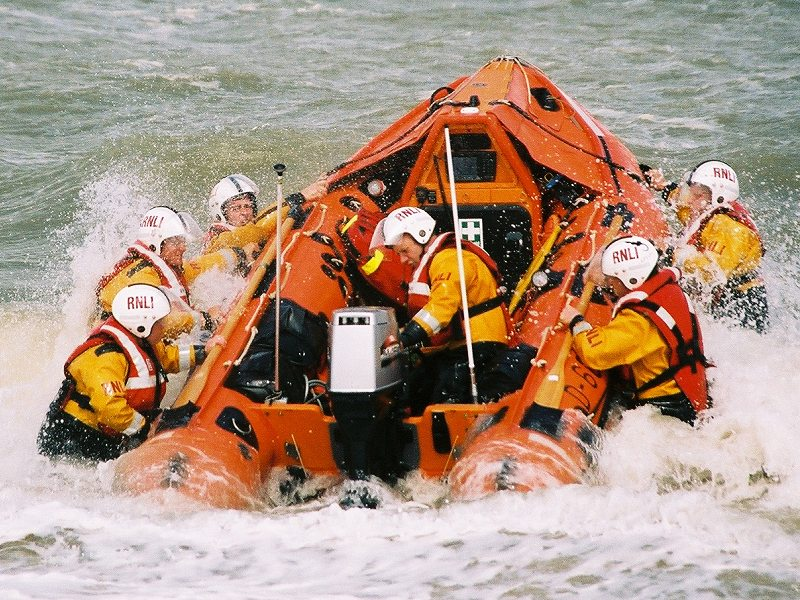
D-class (IB1) Inshore lifeboat Spirit of Berkhamsted (D-607) being launched through the surf of the Happisburgh coast

In 1964, in response to an increasing amount of water-based leisure activity, the RNLI placed 25 small fast Inshore lifeboats around the country. These were easily launched with just a few people, ideal to respond quickly to local emergencies.

More stations were opened, and in June 1965, Happisburgh was re-established as an Inshore lifeboat station, with the arrival of a D-class (RFD PB16) Inshore lifeboat, the unnamed (D-72). It operated from a small house at the top of the cliff above the gap close to the original boathouse, which had been demolished. In 1987, a new Inshore lifeboat house was built on the same site. These facilities included a boat hall, crew room, instruction room, drying room, toilets and washing room. The facilities were improved and a souvenir shop was added in 1998.

== 2000 onwards ==
The ongoing problems of coastal erosion along this part of the Norfolk coastline affected the lifeboat station in 2003. Damage to the cliffs below the station, and the washing away of the slipway down to the beach, caused the station facilities to be closed at the village location. The operations were moved a mile south-east along the coast to Cart Gap, where temporary accommodation was set up, but with the old station still used for training and storage. A further landslide caused more severe damage to the cliffs close to the old station, and what was left of these facilities were demolished in 2012. In the storm surge in December 2013, the former site of this station collapsed into the sea.

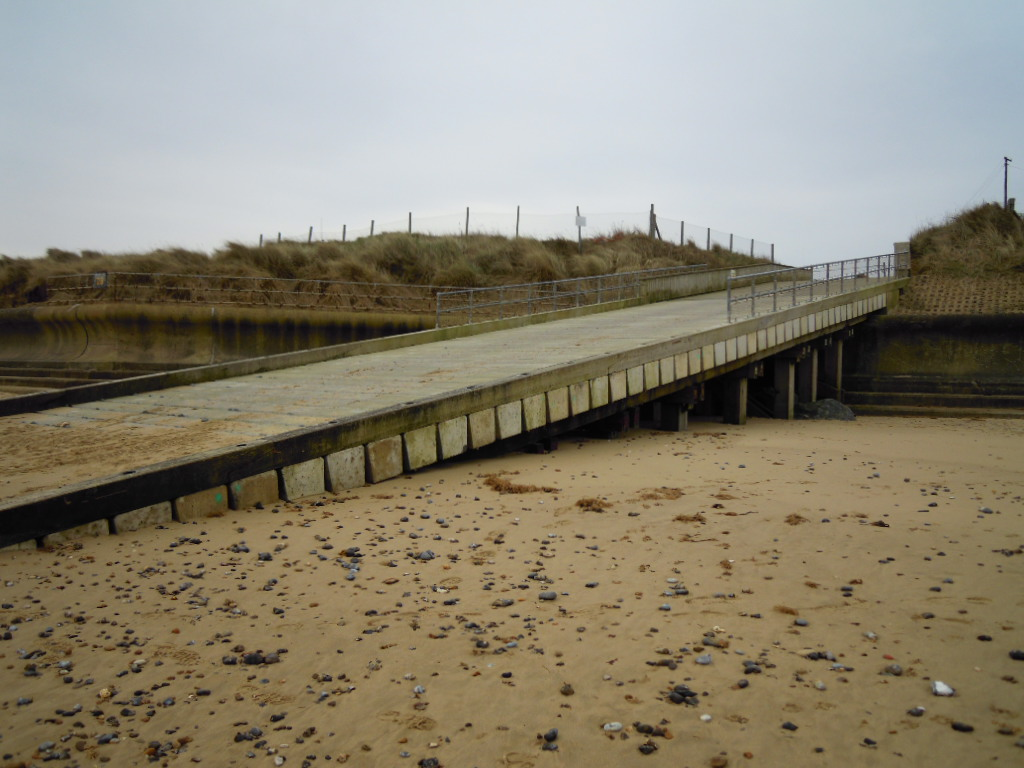
The access ramp down to the beach at Cart Gap

The station was provided with the larger B-class (Atlantic 75) Inshore lifeboat Friendly Forester II (B-710) in 2009, to operate alongside the D-class. Construction of a new launch ramp at Cart Gap was completed, at a cost of £350,000.

Construction of a new boat hall and crew facilities at Cart Gap were completed in 2010, costing a further £150,000.

In July 2023, the RNLI announced that due to launching difficulties following further coastal erosion, the B-class (Atlantic 85) Inshore lifeboat was to be withdrawn from Happisburgh Lifeboat Station.

== Station honours ==
In 1886, coxswain John Cannon retired, and as an acknowledgement of his long and valuable service in saving life from many shipwrecks, he was awarded the RNLI Silver Medal. The citation of services included:

- schooner Atlanta of Kirkwall, 10 December 1868.
- brig Launceston of Shields, 11 February 1871.
- brig Arctic Hero of Goole, 11 February 1871.
- sloop Richard and Elizabeth of Portsmouth, 12 April 1875.
- ketch Rival of London, 8 April 1880.
- collier Ludworth of London, 2 October 1881.

== Gallery ==
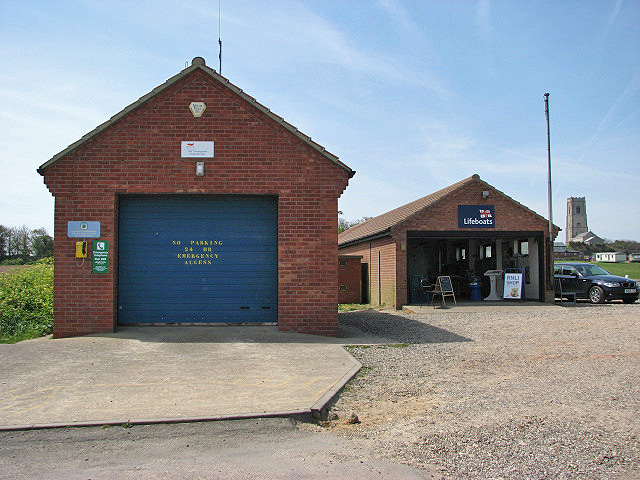
Happisburgh lifeboat station which was demolished in 2012 as it was in imminent danger of falling into the sea. The station had moved to a temporary station in 2003, although these building had been used for storage and training.

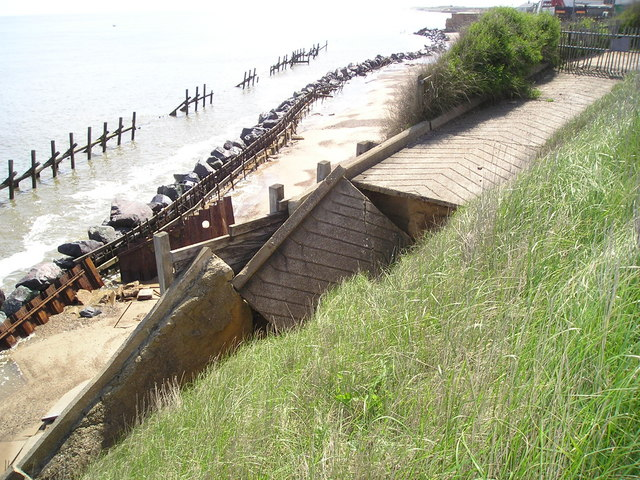
This is the collapsed access slipway to the lifeboat station in the village of Happisburgh. The collapse was caused by coastal erosion in 2003 and made the use of the station in this location impossible. The station moved half a mile south to Cart Gap.

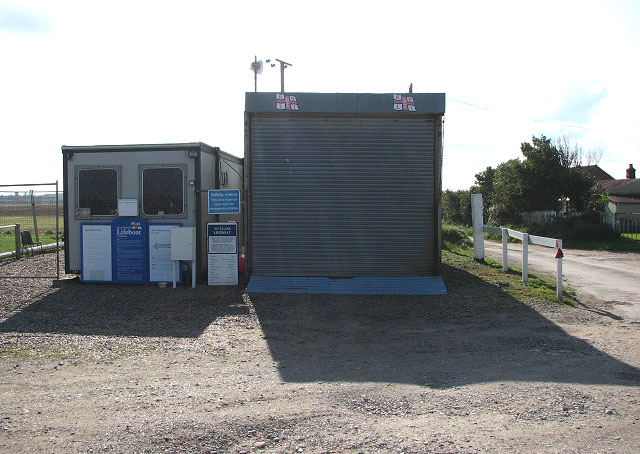
The temporary lifeboat station at Cart Gap used until a more permanent station was opened in 2010.

== Happisburgh lifeboats ==
=== Pulling and Sailing (P&S) lifeboats ===
ON (Note: ON is the RNLI's Official Number of the boat.)	Name	Built	On station	Class	Comments
Pre-467	Huddersfield	1866	1866–1887	32-foot Prowse Self-Righting (P&S)	(Note: 32-foot x 7-foot 7in (10-oared) Prowse-class self-righting (P&S) lifeboat, gift of the Huddersfield LB fund, built by Forrestt of Limehouse, London, costing £240.)
140	Huddersfield	1887	1887–1906	34-foot Self-Righting (P&S)	(Note: 34-foot x 7-foot 6in (10-oared) self-righting (P&S) lifeboat, gift of the Huddersfield LB fund, built by Forrestt of Limehouse, London, costing £406.)
455	Forester	1900	1906–1907	34-foot Rubie Self-Righting (P&S)	(Note: 34-foot x 8-foot (10-oared) Dungeness-class (Rubie) self-righting (P&S) lifeboat, gift of the Ancient Order of Foresters, built by Thames Ironworks of Blackwall, London, costing £712 when new.); Reserve lifeboat No.4, previously at Tynemouth No.2
580	Jacob and Rachel Vallentine	1907	1907–1926	34-foot Rubie Self-Righting (P&S)	(Note: 34-foot x 8-foot (10-oared) Dungeness-class (Rubie) self-righting (P&S) lifeboat, legacy of Mr S. Vallentine of London, built by Thames Ironworks of Blackwall, London, costing £730.)

Station Closed, 1926
Pre ON numbers are unofficial numbers used by the Lifeboat Enthusiast Society to reference early lifeboats not included on the official RNLI list.

=== Inshore lifeboats ===
==== B-class lifeboats ====
Op. No. (Note: Op. No. is the RNLI's Operational Number of the boat carried on the hull.)	Name	On station	Class	Comments
B-710	Friendly Forester II	2009–2012	B-class (Atlantic 75)	
B-742	Douglas Paley	2012–2015	B-class (Atlantic 75)	
B-778	Joan Mary	2015–2017	B-class (Atlantic 75)	
B-899	Howard Bell	2017–2023	B-class (Atlantic 85)	

B-class Inshore lifeboat withdrawn, 2023

==== D-class lifeboats ====
Op. No.	Name	On station	Class	Comments
D-72	Unnamed	1965–1972	D-class (RFD PB16)	Provided by Norwich Round Table
D-213	Unnamed	1973–1987	D-class (RFD PB16)	Provided by the Biggleswade Round Table
D-327	Unnamed	1987–1994	D-class (RFD PB16)	Provided by the Leicester branch of the RNLI
D-468	Colin Martin	1994–2003	D-class (EA16)	
D-607	Spirit of Berkhamsted	2003–2017	D-class (IB1)	Provided by the Berkhamsted branch of the RNLI
D-813	Russell Pickering	2017–	D-class (IB1)	

==== Launch and recovery tractors ====
Op. No.	Reg. No.	Type	On station	Comments
TW29Hc	N144 WUJ	Talus MB-4H Hydrostatic (Mk.2)	2009–2012	
TW36Hc	N805 XUJ	Talus MB-4H Hydrostatic (Mk.2)	2012–2017	
TW25Hc	L807 KNT	Talus MB-4H Hydrostatic (Mk.2)	2018–2023	

== See also ==
- List of RNLI stations
- List of former RNLI stations
- Royal National Lifeboat Institution lifeboats
