= Trearddur Bay Lifeboat Station =

RNLI lifeboat station in Anglesey, Wales

- Gorsaf Bad Achub Trearddur

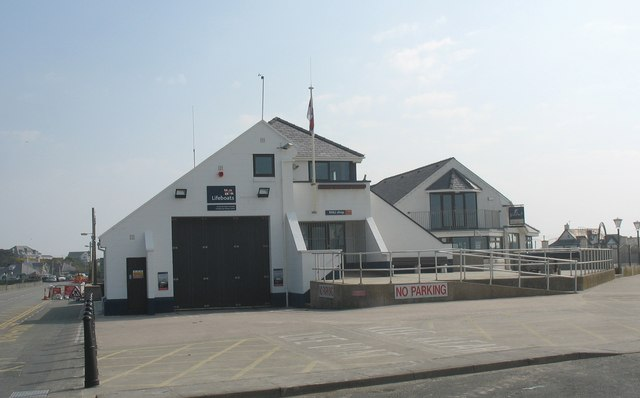
- Trearddur Bay Lifeboat Station

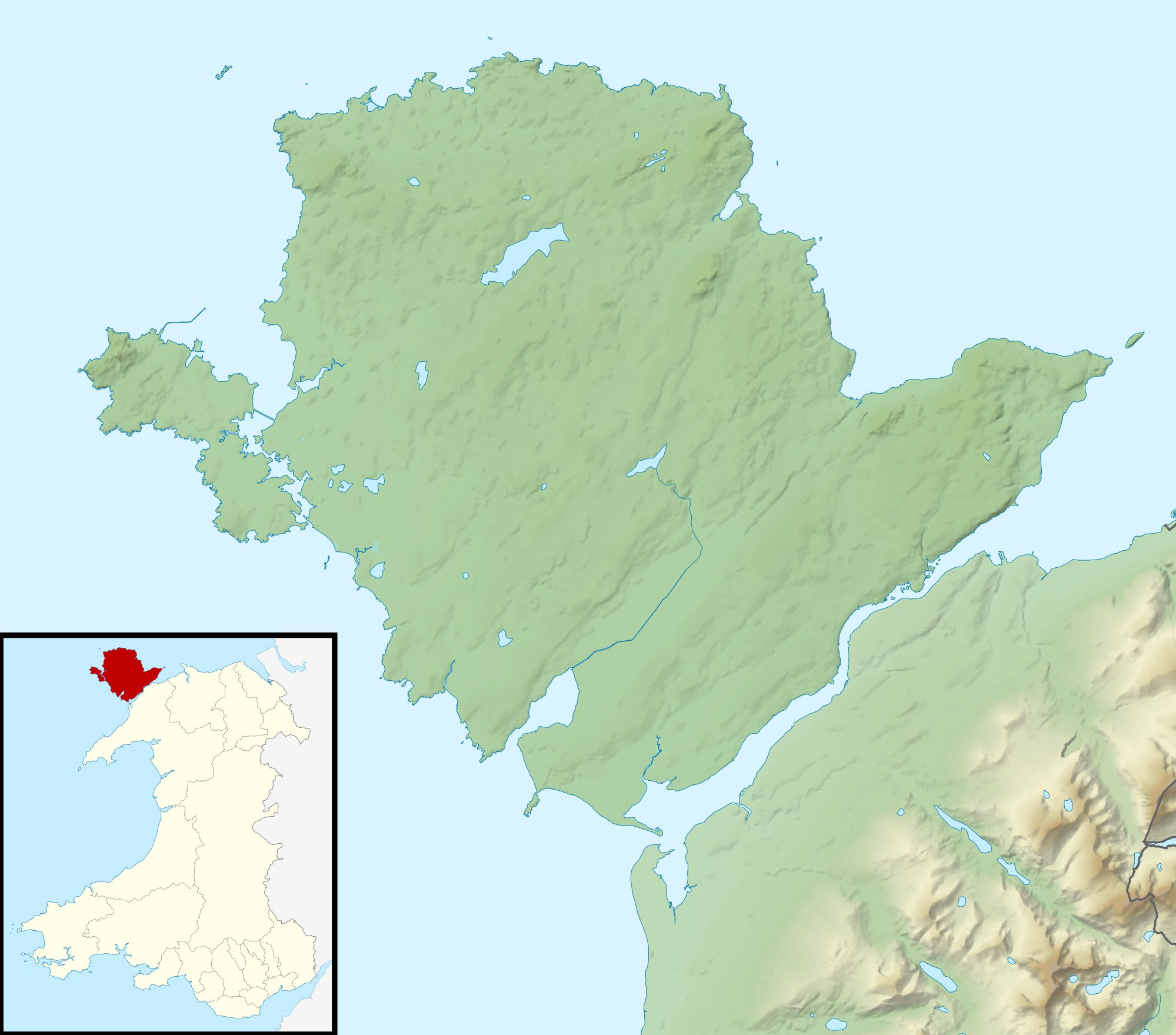
- Location within Anglesey

General information
- Type: RNLI Lifeboat Station
- Location: Lon Isallt, Trearddur Bay, Anglesey, Wales, LL65 2UP, UK
- Coordinates: 53°16′50″N 4°37′11″W
- Opened: May 1967
- Owner: Royal National Lifeboat Institution

Website
- Trearddur Bay RNLI Lifeboat Station

Trearddur Bay Lifeboat Station (Welsh Gorsaf Bad Achub Trearddur) is located in Trearddur, a village and seaside resort overlooking Trearddur Bay, just 2 miles (3.2 km) south of Holyhead, but on the opposite south-west corner of Holy Island, off the north-west coast of Anglesey in Wales.

An Inshore lifeboat station was established at Trearddur in 1967 by the Royal National Lifeboat Institution (RNLI).

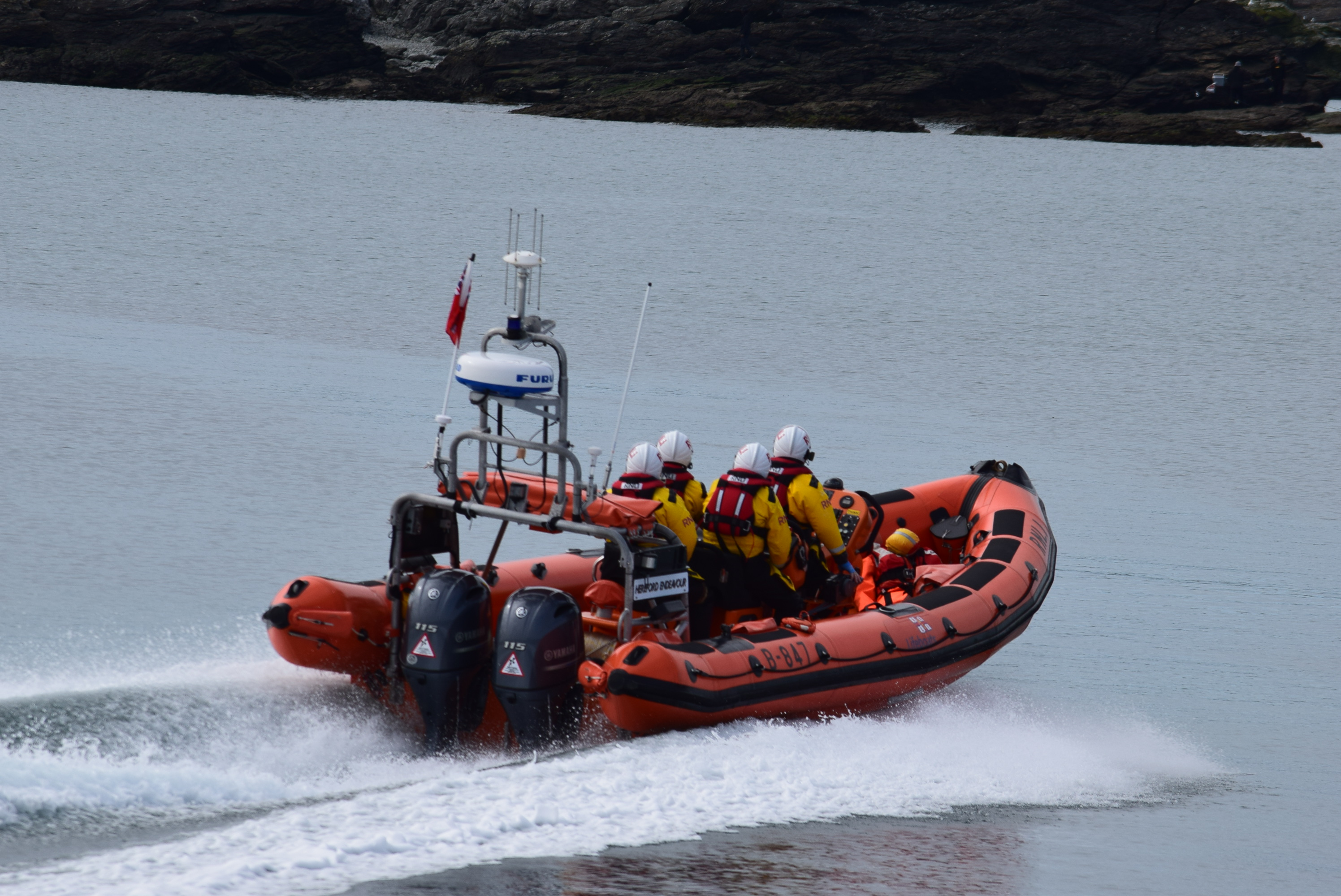
Trearddur Bay Atlantic 85 Lifeboat Hereford Endeavour (B-847)

The station currently operates both an Atlantic 85-class Inshore lifeboat, Hereford Endeavour (B-847), on station since 2010, and the smaller D-class (IB1) Inshore lifeboat, Clive and Imelda Rawlings II (D-885), on station since 2024.

== History ==
In 1964, in response to an increasing amount of water-based leisure activity, the RNLI placed 25 small fast Inshore lifeboats around the country. These were easily launched with just a few people, ideal to respond quickly to local emergencies.

More stations were opened, and in May 1967, a lifeboat station was established at Trearddur Bay. A D-class (RFD PB16) Inshore lifeboat was placed on station, with her first rescue taking place on 4 June. A boathouse was constructed in 1971.

On 2 September 1971, the Trearddur Bay Inshore Lifeboat was launched to the aid of two men, who were clinging on to their dinghy, which had capsized twice in bad conditions, close to Cod Rocks. Both men were rescued. Helm John Burns and crew member Edmund Williams were each awarded the RNLI Bronze Medal.

A new and larger boathouse was built in 1993, which provided changing room facilities, crew room and galley, a workshop, fuel store and storeroom and a souvenir outlet, which allowed a new Atlantic 21-class lifeboat to be placed on station on 5 December 1996, with the D-class being withdrawn.

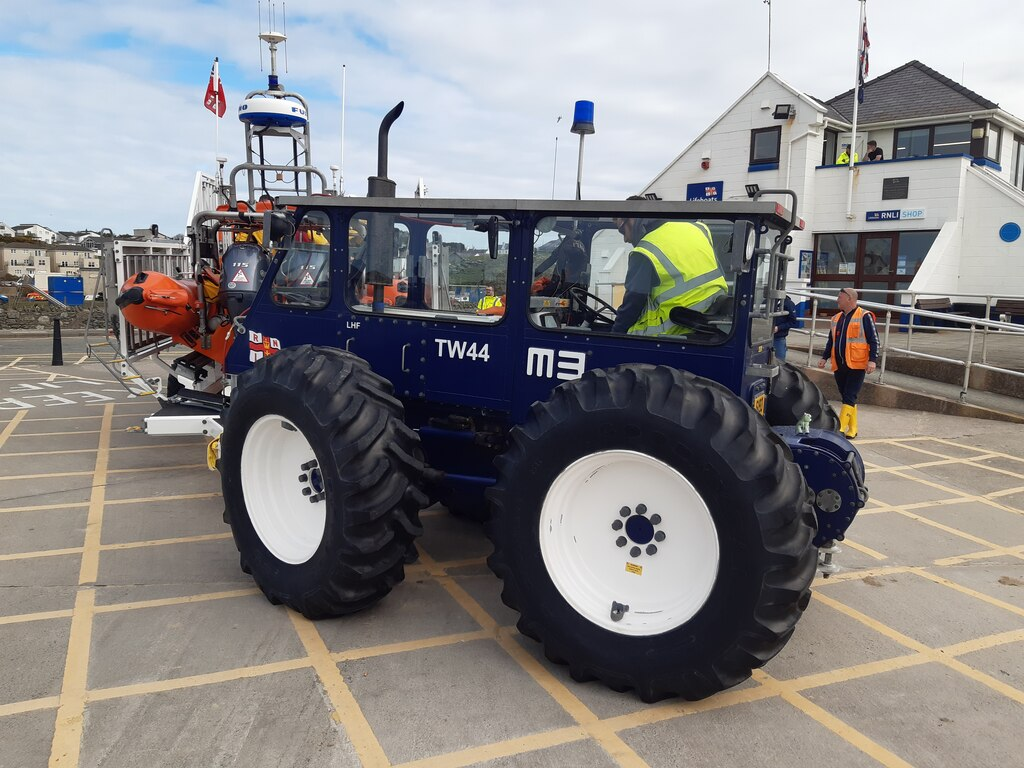
Talus MB-764 amphibious tractor TW44 at Trearddur Bay

On 24 May 2001, Honorary Secretary Jack Abbott MBE was awarded the Royal Humane Society Testimonial Vellum and a Resuscitation Certificate, for his rescue of a man who got into difficulties trying to return to the shore, after swimming after his dinghy which had drifted away from the slipway. Abbott spotted the man face down, 50 m (160 ft) from shore and swam out to him, towed him back to shore and performed CPR.

The same year, a decision was made by the RNLI to reallocate a D-class lifeboat to Trearddur Bay to operate alongside the B-class lifeboat already on station.

On 24 February 2011, on their first official engagement as a couple, Prince William and his fiancée Catherine Middleton attended the station, to officially name the new B-class (Atlantic 85) lifeboat Hereford Endeavour (B-847).

== Medal service ==
In a severe south-westerly force 9 gale on 20 May 2021, the Atlantic 85 was launched to the aid of a female surfer. The surfer had got into difficulties, and was now in the water, struggling to get ashore. She was dangerously close to the Cod Rocks, and was being continuously forced underwater.

The crew made no hesitation launching into conditions, which were at the operating limits of the lifeboat. Helm Duncan showed extreme seamanship and boat handling skills, bringing the lifeboat just 10 m (33 ft) from the rocks, and with precision and good timing, brought the boat to a position, where the crew could quickly retrieve the casualty, whilst ensuring everyone was as safe as possible.

For this service, Lee Duncan was awarded the RNLI Silver Medal. Recognising their contribution and bravery, the three crew members, Dafydd Griffiths, Leigh McCann and Michael Doran were each awarded the RNLI Bronze Medal.

== Station honours ==
The following are awards made at Trearddur Bay.

- RNLI Silver Medal
  for the rescue of a female surfer during gale force 9 winds on 20 May 2021.
  Lee Duncan, Helm – 2022
- RNLI Bronze Medal
  for rescuing two people that were clinging to a capsized dinghy near Cod Rocks.
  John Gilbert Victor Burns, Helm – 1971
  Edmund Michael Owen Williams, crew member – 1971
  for the rescue of a female surfer during gale force 9 winds on 20 May 2021.
  Dafydd Griffiths, crew member – 2022
  Leigh McCann, crew member – 2022
  Michael Doran, crew member – 2022
- Thanks of the Institution Inscribed on Vellum
  for the rescue of three people from a capsized speedboat on 8 September 2001
  Christopher Pritchard, Helm – 2002
- The Walter and Elizabeth Groombridge Award 2001,
  (awarded annually for the most meritorious rescue carried out by an inshore lifeboat crew.)
  for the rescue of three people from a capsized speedboat on 8 September 2001.
  Christopher Pritchard, Helm – 2002
- Testimonial Vellum and Resuscitation Certificate awarded by the Royal Humane Society
  Jack Abbott, MBE, Hon. Secretary – 2001
- A Framed Letter of Thanks signed by the Chairman of the Institution
  for his actions during a search for a child who had fallen into the sea at Rhoscolyn.
  Alan Hughes, Helm – 1999
  for his part in saving the lives of two divers.
  Terry Pendlebury, Helm – 2006
- Chief Executives Commendation
  All the team at Trearddur Bay RNLI – 2022
- Chief Executives Letter of Commendation
  Paul Moffett, Lifeboat Operations Manager – 2022
- Letter of Commendation from the Director of Operations
  Mark Smith, Tractor Driver – 2022
- Commendation by the Medical Director of the RNLI
  Lee Duncan, Helm – 2022
  Steve Williams – 2022
  Tom Moffett – 2022
  Matthew Hannaby – 2022
  Mike Doran – 2022

== Trearddur Bay lifeboats ==
=== D class ===
Op.No. (Note: Op. No. is the RNLI's Operational Number of the boat carried on the hull.)	Name	On station	Class	Comments
D-126	Unnamed	1967–1977	D-class (RFD PB16)	
D-259	S.M.T.A. Shuttle	1978–1988	D-class (RFD PB16)	
D-367	Sea Horse	1988–1996	D-class (EA16)	D-class withdrawn on arrival of B-class in 1996
D-class withdrawn 1996–2001
D-441	Irish Diver	2001–2002	D-class (EA16)	D-class reinstated
D-440	Brenda Reed	2002–2004	D-class (EA16)	
D-614	Flo and Dick Smith	2004–2012	D-class (IB1)	
D-753	Clive and Imelda Rawlings	2012–2024	D-class (IB1)	
D-885	Clive and Imelda Rawlings II	2024–	D-class (IB1)	

=== B class ===
Op.No.	Name	On station	Class	Comments
B-540	Wolverhampton	1996	B-class (Atlantic 21)	
B-731	Dorothy Selina	1996–2010	B-class (Atlantic 75)	
B-847	Hereford Endeavour	2010–	B-class (Atlantic 85)	

=== Launch and recovery tractors ===
Op.No.	Reg. No.	Type	On station	Comments
TW05	UJT 151S	Talus MB-764 County	1996–2002	
TW04	TEL 705R	Talus MB-764 County	2002–2010	
TW48	V281 EUJ	Talus MB-764 County	2010–2011	
TW01	XTK 150M	Talus MB-764 County	2011–2020	
TW44	S193 RUJ	Talus MB-764 County	2020–	

== See also ==
- List of RNLI stations
- List of former RNLI stations
- Royal National Lifeboat Institution lifeboats
- Talus Atlantic 85 DO-DO launch carriage
