= Silloth Lifeboat Station =

RNLI lifeboat station in Cumbria, England

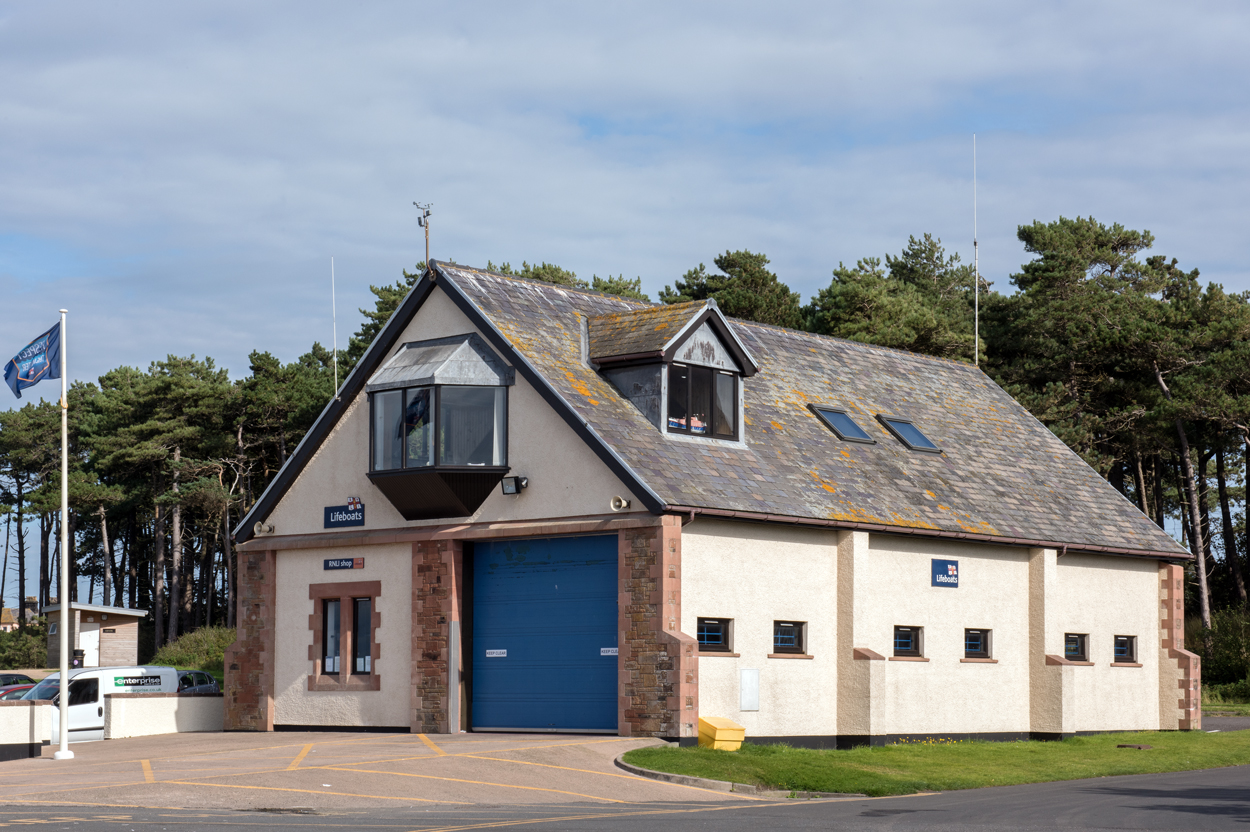
- Silloth Lifeboat Station

- Location within Cumbria

General information
- Type: RNLI Lifeboat Station
- Location: The Boathouse, Lawn Terrace, Silloth, Cumbria, CA7 4AW, England
- Coordinates: 54°52′12.1″N 3°23′35.7″W
- Opened: 1860–1896; 1967–present (ILB)
- Owner: Royal National Lifeboat Institution

Website
- Silloth RNLI Lifeboat Station

Silloth Lifeboat Station is located at the end of Lawn Terrace, in Silloth, a port town sitting on the Solway Firth, approximately 20 miles (32 km) due west of Carlisle, on the north west coast of Cumbria.

A lifeboat was first stationed at Silloth by the Royal National Lifeboat Institution (RNLI) in 1860, operating until 1896. The station was re-established as an Inshore lifeboat station in 1967.

The station currently operates a B-class (Atlantic 85) Inshore lifeboat, Elaine and Don Wilkinson (B-828), on station since 2008.

== History ==
In agreement with the local population, who had made a significant financial contribution towards the cost of a boathouse and carriage, and who had agreed to maintain the service jointly with the RNLI, a new lifeboat station was established at Silloth in 1860. The cost of a new lifeboat had been met by well-known philanthropist Miss Angela Burdett-Coutts. A 30 ft 0 in (9.14 m) x 7 ft 0 in (2.13 m) self-righting 'Pulling and Sailing' (P&S) lifeboat. one with sails and (six) oars, was placed on station, and named Angela and Hannah.

By 1867, the Angela and Hannah was found to be unfit, and withdrawn from service. Transported by both the London and North-Western, and North British railway companies free of charge, a replacement 32 ft (9.8 m) lifeboat was placed at Silloth. The lifeboat was again named Angela and Hannah, after Miss Burdett-Coutts and her sister.

The Silloth lifeboat Angela and Hannah was launched at 07:30 on 24 January 1876 into gale-force conditions, to the schooner Tweed, on passage from Falmouth to Silloth, when she struck Powfoot Bank. With waves breaking over both vessels, five crew and the pilot were rescued. The lifeboat was towed back in by the Steam tug Arabian.

In 1885, a new 34-foot self-righting (P&S) lifeboat was placed at Silloth. Funded from the gift of Miss Annie F. Howis of Tulse Hill, on her direction, the boat was named Emma Frisby (ON 81).

At a meeting of the RNLI management committee on Thursday 13 August 1896, following a report by district inspectors, a one-line entry records "Decided that the Silloth Life-boat station be discontinued". The station was duly closed, and the lifeboat Emma Frisby (ON 81) was sold from service.

== 1960s onwards ==
In 1964, in response to an increasing amount of water-based leisure activity, the RNLI placed 25 small fast Inshore lifeboats around the country. These were easily launched with just a few people, ideal to respond quickly to local emergencies.

More stations were opened, and in August 1967, a lifeboat station was re-established at Silloth, with the arrival of a D-class (RFD PB16) Inshore lifeboat (D-146). The old boathouse was re-acquired, and converted to house the Inshore lifeboat. In 1975, the lifeboat was upgraded to a C-class lifeboat, (C-502), a larger faster twin-engined version of the D-class boat.

The C-class lifeboat was replaced with a B-class (Atlantic 21) lifeboat, assigned to Silloth in 1979. Developed at Atlantic College in partnership with the RNLI, the Atlantic 21-class was the first generation of rigid inflatable boat (RIB) to be placed in service. The relief lifeboat Major Osman Gabriel (B-505) was placed at Silloth for a short time, until the permanent lifeboat Amelia Gregory Armstrong (B-545) arrived in 1980. The boathouse was extended to accommodate the launch tractor.

On 19 March 1994, 'A Framed Letter of Thanks signed by the Chairman of the Institution' was awarded to Helm David Litt, for his seamanship and courage bringing the lifeboat through rocks in four-foot breaking waves to rescue three boys stranded at Southerness Point.

In 1994, a new larger B-class (Atlantic 75) was assigned to the station. A new boathouse was constructed on the site of the old one, in order to accommodate the larger boat and launch tractor. Crew facilities were much improved, along with a new crew-room and lookout, and a retail outlet for souvenirs. A new slipway was also constructed. The cost of the lifeboat had been met by the fundraisers from the Lake District raising £20,000, and an appeal at Silloth and Carlisle raising £41,000. At a ceremony on 11 October 1995, the boathouse was formally opened by H.R.H. The Duchess of Kent, who then named the lifeboat Spirit of Cumbria (B-714).

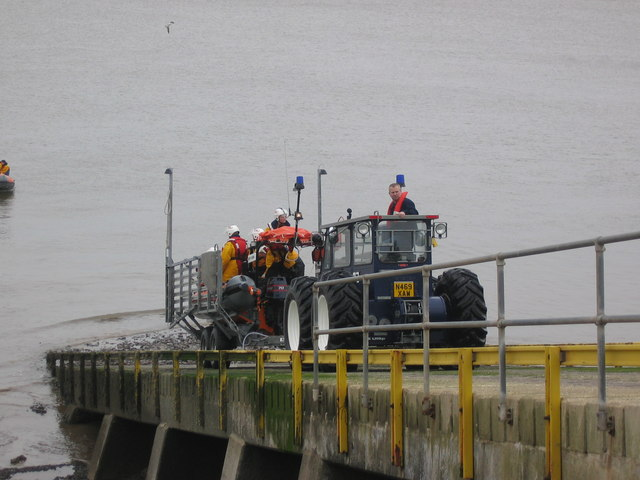
Launch of B-class (Atlantic 85) Elaine and Don Wilkinson (B-828)

Helm Steven Henderson was awarded a "Framed Letter of Thanks signed by the Chairman of the Institution" in 2002, for his command of the lifeboat during the rescue of two people from the yacht Susilla, in difficulty in force 7–8 winds, on 26 November, 2002.

Spirit of Cumbria (B-714) served the station for 13 years. Funded from the bequest of the late Mr Donald Wilkinson, she was replaced by a new B-class (Atlantic 85) lifeboat, Elaine and Don Wilkinson (B-828), placed on service on Saturday 15 November 2008.

At a ceremony on Sunday 9 February 2025, 10 crew members, all with five years front-line service, were presented with the King's Coronation Medal by David Beeby, Deputy Lord Lieutenant of Cumbria.

== Station honours ==
The following are awards made at Silloth.

- 'A Framed Letter of Thanks signed by the Chairman of the Institution'
  David Litt, Helm – 1994
  Steven Henderson, Helm – 2002
- King Charles III Coronation Medal

Jim Blake – 2025
Chris Clark – 2025
Steven Henderson – 2025
Stuart Henderson – 2025
Dr Darren Hymers – 2025

Kevin James – 2025
Andrew Rowe – 2025
Mick Satterthwaite – 2025
Tom Stalker – 2025
Mark Ware – 2025

== Roll of honour ==
In memory of those lost while serving at Silloth:

- Lost when their Fire Service rescue boat capsized, whilst trying to save a man stranded in Skinburness Marsh, 10 December 1956
  Joseph Bell (37)
  Stanley Graham (29)
  John J. Johnstone (47)
  Alexander Black Ramsay (43)

== Silloth lifeboats ==
=== Pulling and Sailing (P&S) lifeboats ===
ON (Note: ON is the RNLI's Official Number of the boat.)	Name	Built	On station	Class	Comments
Pre-362	Angela and Hannah	1860	1860–1867	30-foot Peake self-righting (P&S)	(Note: 30 ft 0 in (9.14 m) x 7 ft 0 in (2.13 m) (6-oared) Peake-class self-righting (P&S) lifeboat, gift of Miss A. Burdett-Coutts of Piccadilly, built by Forrestt of Limehouse, London, costing £168.); Capsized 1863. Broken up in 1867.
Pre-502	Angela and Hannah	1867	1867–1877	32-foot Prowse self-righting (P&S)	(Note: 32 ft 0 in (9.75 m) x 7 ft 6 in (2.29 m) (10-oared) Prowse-class self-righting (P&S) lifeboat, gift of Miss A. Burdett-Coutts of Piccadilly, built by Forrest of Limehouse, London, costing £246.); Renamed Mary Louisa in 1877.
Pre-502	Mary Louisa	1867	1877–1885	32-foot Prowse self-righting (P&S)	(Note: Legacy of Miss M. L. Browne of Liverpool.); Broken up in 1885.
81	Emma Frisby	1885	1885–1896	34-foot self-righting (P&S)	(Note: 34 ft 0 in (10.36 m) x 7 ft 6 in (2.29 m) (10-oared) self-righting (P&S) lifeboat, gift of Miss A. Howis of Tulse Hill, built by Woolfe of Shadwell, London, costing £310.); Sold in 1896.

Station Closed in 1896
Pre ON numbers are unofficial numbers used by the Lifeboat Enthusiasts' Society to reference early lifeboats not included on the official RNLI list.

=== Inshore lifeboats ===
Op.No. (Note: Op. No. is the RNLI's Operational Number of the boat carried on the hull.)	Name	On station	Class	Comments
D-146	Unnamed	1967–1969	D-class (RFD PB16)	
D-144	Unnamed	1970–1975	D-class (RFD PB16)	
C-502	John Gilpin	1975–1977	C-class (Zodiac Grand Raid IV)	
C-503	Unnamed	1977–1979	C-class (Zodiac Grand Raid IV)	
B-505	Major Osman Gabriel	1979–1980	B-class (Atlantic 21)	
B-545	Amelia Gregory Armstrong	1980–1995	B-class (Atlantic 21)	
B-714	Spirit of Cumbria	1995–2008	B-class (Atlantic 75)	
B-828	Elaine and Don Wilkinson	2008–	B-class (Atlantic 85)	

=== Launch and recovery tractors ===
Op.No.	Reg. No.	Type	On station	Comments
TA20	EHO 416S	Ford Tractor	<1992–1994	
TW15	E592 WNT	Talus MB-764 County	1994–1998	
TW02	LRU 581P	Talus MB-764 County	1998–2003	
TW38	N469 XAW	Talus MB-764 County	2003–2013	
TW35	N506 WNT	Talus MB-764 County	2013–2024	
TW13	D948 SAW	Talus MB-764 County	2024–	

== See also ==
- List of RNLI stations
- List of former RNLI stations
- Royal National Lifeboat Institution lifeboats
- Talus Atlantic 85 DO-DO launch carriage
