= Largs Lifeboat Station =

RNLI Lifeboat station in North Ayrshire, Scotland

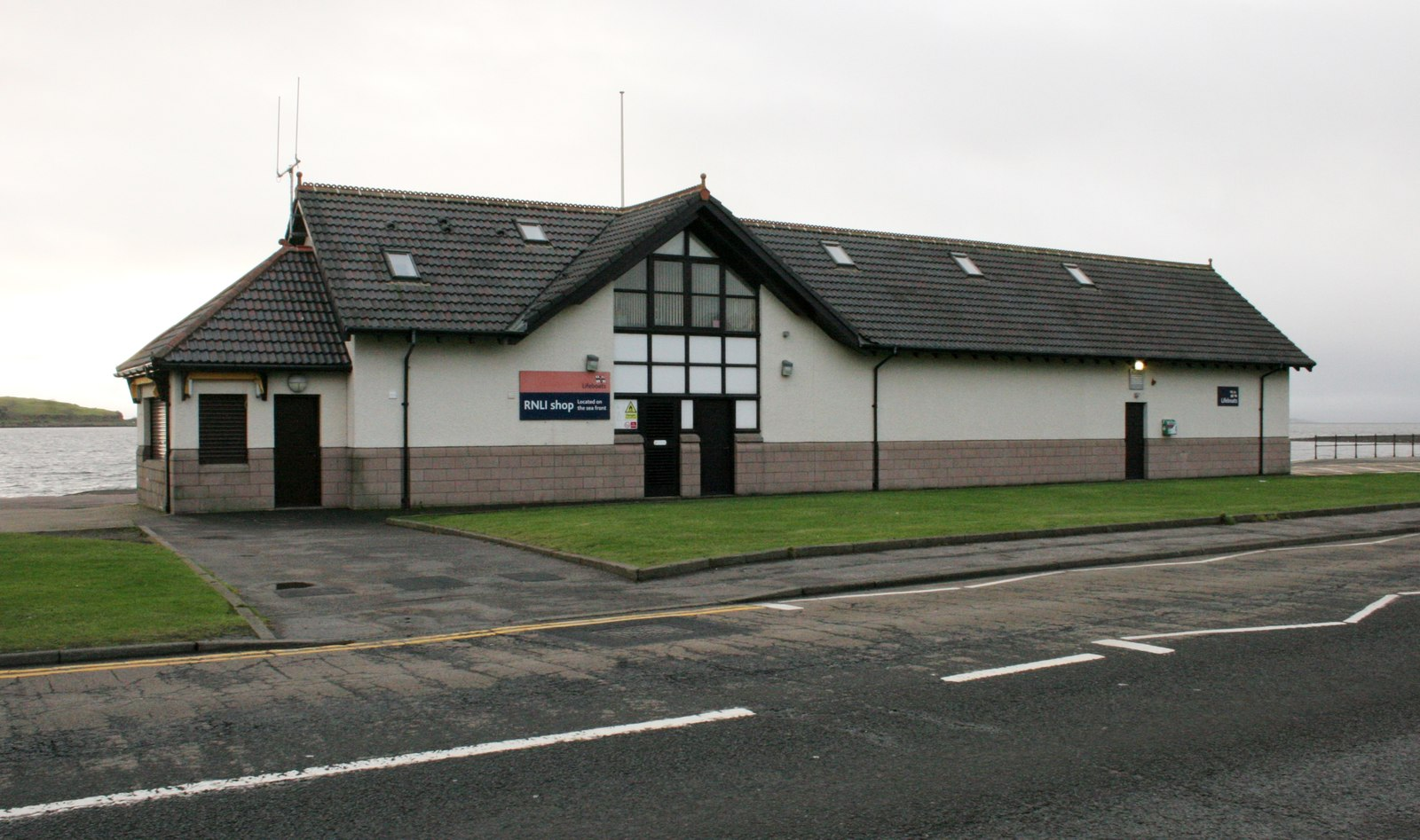
- Largs Lifeboat Station

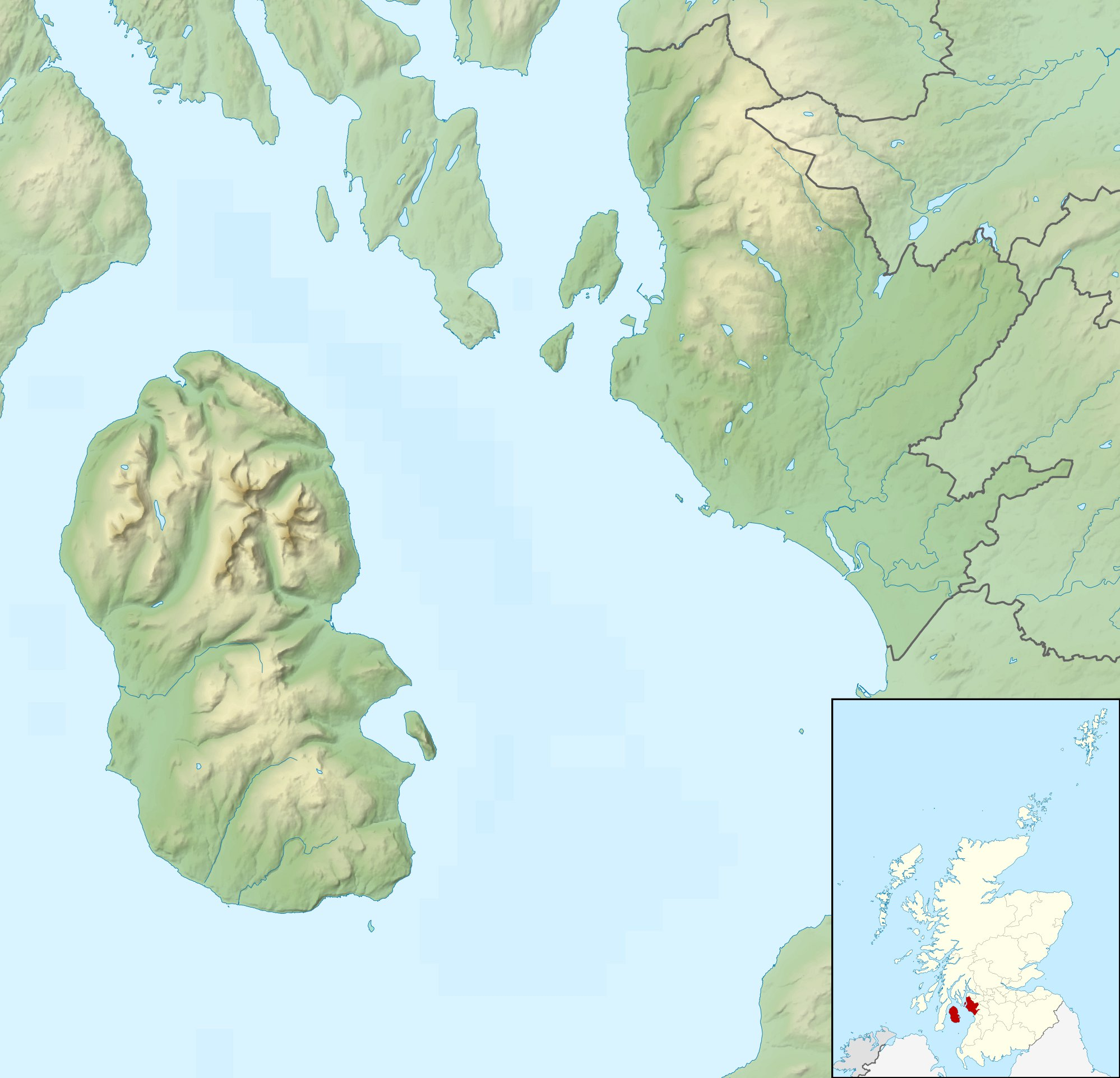
- Location within North Ayrshire

General information
- Type: RNLI Lifeboat Station
- Location: Greenock Road, Largs, North Ayrshire, KA30 8PQ, Scotland
- Coordinates: 55°48′00.0″N 4°52′14.1″W
- Opened: May 1964
- Owner: Royal National Lifeboat Institution

Website
- Largs RNLI Lifeboat Station

Largs Lifeboat Station is located at the junction of Greenock Road and Barfields, in the seaside town of Largs, which sits overlooking the Firth of Clyde, in North Ayrshire, on the west coast of Scotland.

A lifeboat station was first established at Largs in May 1964, by the Royal National Lifeboat Institution (RNLI).

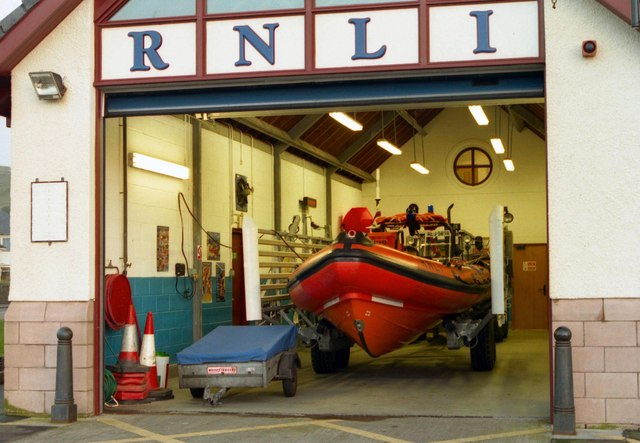
B-class (Atlantic 75) Peggy Keith Learmond (B-739), ready in the new boathouse

The station currently operates a B-class (Atlantic 85) Inshore lifeboat (ILB), R. A. Wilson (B-854), on station since 2011.

== History ==
In response to the increasing amount of water-based leisure activity around the coast, the RNLI decided to introduce a number of small fast Inshore lifeboats, which could respond quickly to local emergencies, and be launched with just a handful of people. Trials took place over the winter of 1963, and it was decided that 25 Inshore boats would be placed around the UK. In Scotland, just two sites were chosen, at Broughty Ferry and Largs.

In May 1964, Largs Lifeboat Station was established, with the arrival of an unnamed 16-foot D-class (RFD PB16) Inshore lifeboat, (D-22). Initially, the Inshore boats were seasonal, being introduced in the spring, and withdrawn in autumn. The stations didn't always get the same boat back each year.

The Largs Inshore lifeboat was launched to the aid of 6 men aboard a drilling rig (pontoon) off Hunterston. On arrival, the pontoon was found to be moving violently in the rough conditions, and it was decided to take the six men off. All 6 men, and their service launch, were recovered to Hunterston Jetty. A 'Framed Letter of Thanks signed by the Chairman of the Institution' was awarded to each of the three crew of the ILB, Helm John H. Harrison, and crew members Robert Watson, and John Mackie.

It was decided in 1973, that a larger faster twin-engined B-class lifeboat would be placed at Largs. The relief B-class (Atlantic 21) lifeboat Co-operative No.1 (B-511) arrived on station temporarily in 1973 for training. Soon afterwards, the D-class (RFD PB16) (D-151) was withdrawn, and the Atlantic 21 lifeboat William McCunn and Broom Church Youth Fellowship (B-513) was placed on service, to become the permanent lifeboat at Largs until 1980.

At a ceremony on July 18 1981, a new boathouse, funded from the legacy of the late Miss Janet Brunton, was formally handed over to the RNLI, and the new Atlantic 21 which had arrived in 1980 was named Independent Forester Liberty (B-547).

On 24 July 1983, Largs lifeboat Independent Forester Liberty (B-547) was launched to the aid of a capsized motor-boat, off Fairhaven, on the east side of Great Cumbrae Island, with four people aboard. Two men had been picked up by a yacht, and the third was pulled unconscious from the water into a motor-boat, but didn't survive. The fourth person, a girl, was still trapped in an air-pocket in the boat. After several attempts ducking into the water, and under the upturned boat, crewman Arthur Hill managed to get the girl free, and into the waiting lifeboat. Hill was awarded both the RNLI Silver Medal, and the Maud Smith Award 1983. Helm John Strachan was accorded 'The Thanks of the Institution inscribed on Vellum'.

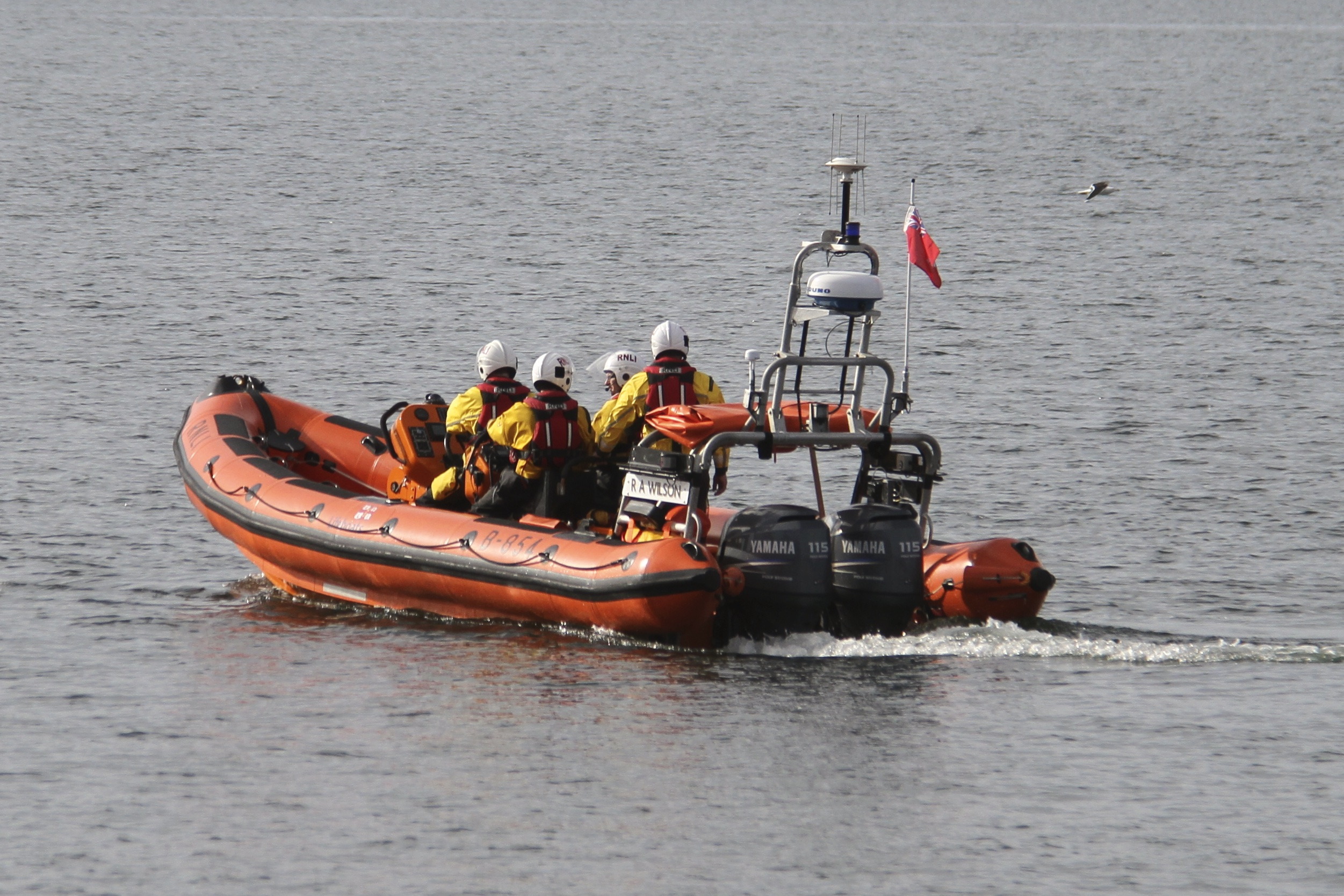
Largs B-class (Atlantic 85) lifeboat R. A. Wilson (B-854)

In 1997, the station received a replacement lifeboat, the larger B-class (Atlantic 75). The 1981 boathouse was no longer big enough to accommodate both the boat and the Talus MB-764 County amphibious tractor used to launch the boat. A new larger boathouse was constructed, with new crew facilities, workshop and storage. Completed in February 1998, the boathouse was formally opened by H.R.H. Princess Anne in July 1998.

A new B-class (Atlantic 85) lifeboat, R. A. Wilson (B-854), was placed on service on 6 November 2011. The new lifeboat was funded by Robert Amory Wilson.

== Station honours ==
The following are awards made at Largs.

- RNLI Silver Medal

Arthur Maclean Hill, crew member – 1983

- The Thanks of the Institution inscribed on Vellum

John Strachan, Helm – 1983

- The Maud Smith Award 1983
  (for the bravest act of lifesaving during the year by a member of a lifeboat crew)

Arthur Maclean Hill, crew member – 1983

- A Framed Letter of Thanks signed by the Chairman of the Institution

John H. Harrison, Helm – 1971
Robert Watson, crew member – 1971
John Mackie, crew member – 1971

== Largs lifeboats ==
=== D-class ===
Op. No. (Note: Op. No. is the RNLI's Operational Number of the boat carried on the hull.)	Name	On station	Class	Comments
D-22	Unnamed	1964	D-class (RFD PB16)	
D-36	Unnamed	1964	D-class (RFD PB16)	
D-46	Unnamed	1965–1967	D-class (RFD PB16)	
D-151	Unnamed	1967–1970	D-class (RFD PB16)	
D-185	Unnamed	1970–1971	D-class (RFD PB16)	
D-151	Unnamed	1971–1973	D-class (RFD PB16)	

D-class withdrawn, 1973

=== B-class ===
Op. No.	Name	On station	Class	Comments
B-511	Co-operative No.1	1973	B-class (Atlantic 21)	
B-513	William McCunn and Broom Church; Youth Fellowship	1973–1980	B-class (Atlantic 21)	
B-547	Independent Forester Liberty	1980–1998	B-class (Atlantic 21)	
B-739	Peggy Keith Learmond	1997–2011	B-class (Atlantic 75)	
B-854	R. A. Wilson	2011–	B-class (Atlantic 85)	

=== Launch and recovery tractors ===
Op. No.	Reg. No.	Type	On station	Comments
TW06	VRU 611S	Talus MB-764 County	1992–1997	
TW11	B251 HUX	Talus MB-764 County	1997–1998	
TW15	E592 WNT	Talus MB-764 County	1998–2005	
TW03	RLJ 367R	Talus MB-764 County	2005–2012	
TW10	VEL 99X	Talus MB-764 County	2012–2013	
TW63	DS13 LGW	Talus MB-764 County	2013–	

== See also ==
- List of RNLI stations
- List of former RNLI stations
- Royal National Lifeboat Institution lifeboats
