= Talus MB-764 amphibious tractor =

RNLI amphibious launch tractor

Talus MB-764
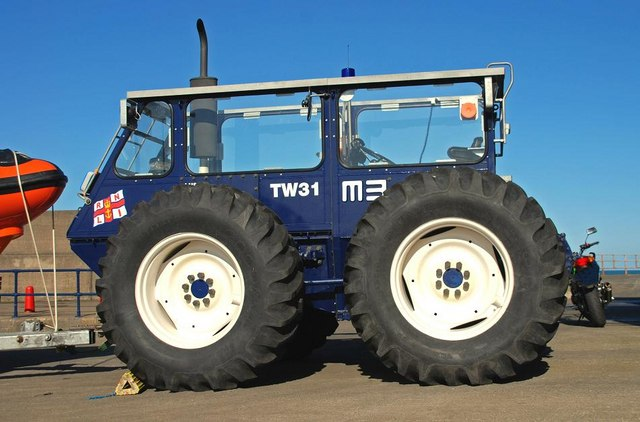
- Talus MB-764 RNLI Launch Vehicle
- Type: Launch vehicle
- Manufacturer: Clayton Engineering Limited
- Length: 3.880 m (152.8 in)
- Width: 2.260 m (89.0 in)
- Height: 2.950 in (0.0749 m)
- Propulsion: All Gear 4 wheel drive
- Engine model: 4 cylinder Diesel
- Gross power: 80 hp (60 kW)

Talus MB-764 is a four-wheel drive launch tractor which was specifically designed for the RNLI, to launch and recover inflatable inshore lifeboats from beach and shorebased launched lifeboat stations. The Tractor is produced by the British company of Clayton Engineering Limited who are based in Knighton, Powys.

== Development ==
The MB-764 was the first launch tractor designed and developed in conjunction with the RNLI to launch the institutions smaller inshore inflatable lifeboat fleet. Clayton’s based the design of the MB-764 on Ford County Commercial Cars. At the design and development stage the company presented two Prototype models. The first being the main take up by the RNLI. The first of these launch tractors went into service with the RNLI in 1975 and since then over 30 tractors have been operated by the Institute around the United Kingdom and Ireland. The basic design, operating and performance characteristics have not changed from the initial design concept vehicle, with the exception of the propelled wading capability.

All of the following fleet details are referenced to the 2026 Lifeboat Enthusiast Society Handbook, with information retrieved directly from RNLI records.

== RNLI Talus MB-764 fleet ==
=== Current Location ===
Op. No. (Note: Op. No. is the RNLI's Operational Number)	Reg No.	Station	In service	Image	Current Pay-load	Comments
TW01	XTK 150M	New Brighton	1974–1987		Atlantic 85; Claude and Kath (B-947)	
TW01	XTK 150M	Cardigan	1987–1995		Atlantic 85; Claude and Kath (B-947)	
TW01	XTK 150M	Relief fleet	1995–1996		Atlantic 85; Claude and Kath (B-947)	
TW01	XTK 150M	St Bees	1996–2000		Atlantic 85; Claude and Kath (B-947)	
TW01	XTK 150M	Relief fleet	2000–2002		Atlantic 85; Claude and Kath (B-947)	
TW01	J 72200	St Catherine	2002–2010		Atlantic 85; Claude and Kath (B-947)	
TW01	XTK 150M	Relief fleet	2010–2011		Atlantic 85; Claude and Kath (B-947)	
TW01	XTK 150M	Trearddur Bay	2011–2020		Atlantic 85; Claude and Kath (B-947)	
TW01	XTK 150M	Relief fleet	2020–2024		Atlantic 85; Claude and Kath (B-947)	
TW01	XTK 150M	Teignmouth	2024–		Atlantic 85; Claude and Kath (B-947)	
TW02	LRU 581P	Relief fleet	1976		Atlantic 85; Rachael Hedderwick (B-876)	
TW02	LRU 581P	Beaumaris	1976–1987		Atlantic 85; Rachael Hedderwick (B-876)	
TW02	LRU 581P	Cardigan	1987		Atlantic 85; Rachael Hedderwick (B-876)	
TW02	LRU 581P	Abersoch	1988–1997		Atlantic 85; Rachael Hedderwick (B-876)	
TW02	LRU 581P	Silloth	1998–2003		Atlantic 85; Rachael Hedderwick (B-876)	
TW02	LRU 581P	Relief fleet	2003–2004		Atlantic 85; Rachael Hedderwick (B-876)	
TW02	LRU 581P	Lyme Regis	2004–2014		Atlantic 85; Rachael Hedderwick (B-876)	
TW02	LRU 581P	Relief fleet	2014–2015		Atlantic 85; Rachael Hedderwick (B-876)	
TW02	LRU 581P	Weston-super-Mare	2015–2023		Atlantic 85; Rachael Hedderwick (B-876)	
TW02	LRU 581P	Relief fleet	2023–2024		Atlantic 85; Rachael Hedderwick (B-876)	
TW02	LRU 581P	Portishead	2024–2025		Atlantic 85; Rachael Hedderwick (B-876)	
TW02	LRU 581P	Arran (Lamlash)	2025–		Atlantic 85; Rachael Hedderwick (B-876)	
TW03	RLJ 367R	Blackpool	1977–1979		Atlantic 85; Spirit of Loch Fyne (B-857)	
TW03	RLJ 367R	Relief fleet	1979–1981		Atlantic 85; Spirit of Loch Fyne (B-857)	
TW03	RLJ 367R	Newbiggin	1981		Atlantic 85; Spirit of Loch Fyne (B-857)	
TW03	RLJ 367R	Relief fleet	1981–1986		Atlantic 85; Spirit of Loch Fyne (B-857)	
TW03	RLJ 367R	St Ives	1986–1991		Atlantic 85; Spirit of Loch Fyne (B-857)	
TW03	RLJ 367R	Rye Harbour	1991–1992		Atlantic 85; Spirit of Loch Fyne (B-857)	
TW03	RLJ 367R	Aberystwyth	1992–1996		Atlantic 85; Spirit of Loch Fyne (B-857)	
TW03	RLJ 367R	Relief fleet	1996–1998		Atlantic 85; Spirit of Loch Fyne (B-857)	
TW03	RLJ 367R	Arran (Lamlash)	1998–2004		Atlantic 85; Spirit of Loch Fyne (B-857)	
TW03	RLJ 367R	Relief fleet	2004–2005		Atlantic 85; Spirit of Loch Fyne (B-857)	
TW03	RLJ 367R	Largs	2005–2012		Atlantic 85; Spirit of Loch Fyne (B-857)	
TW03	RLJ 367R	Kinghorn	2012–2014		Atlantic 85; Spirit of Loch Fyne (B-857)	
TW03	RLJ 367R	Kessock	2015–2016		Atlantic 85; Spirit of Loch Fyne (B-857)	
TW03	RLJ 367R	Relief fleet	2016–2017		Atlantic 85; Spirit of Loch Fyne (B-857)	
TW03	RLJ 367R	Kinghorn	2017–2022		Atlantic 85; Spirit of Loch Fyne (B-857)	
TW03	RLJ 367R	Relief fleet	2022–2023		Atlantic 85; Spirit of Loch Fyne (B-857)	
TW03	RLJ 367R	Lyme Regis	2023–		Atlantic 85; Spirit of Loch Fyne (B-857)	
TW04	TEL 705R	Whitstable	1977–1994		Atlantic 85; Eric W Wilson (B-841)	
TW04	TEL 705R	Cardigan	1995–2002		Atlantic 85; Eric W Wilson (B-841)	
TW04	TEL 705R	Trearddur Bay	2002–2010		Atlantic 85; Eric W Wilson (B-841)	
TW04	TEL 705R	Relief fleet	2010–2011		Atlantic 85; Eric W Wilson (B-841)	
TW04	TEL 705R	Kinghorn	2011–2012		Atlantic 85; Eric W Wilson (B-841)	
TW04	TEL 705R	Relief fleet	2012–2014		Atlantic 85; Eric W Wilson (B-841)	
TW04	TEL 705R	Kinghorn	2014–2017		Atlantic 85; Eric W Wilson (B-841)	
TW04	TEL 705R	Relief fleet	2017–2019		Atlantic 85; Eric W Wilson (B-841)	
TW04	J 93085	St Catherine	2019–2025		Atlantic 85; Eric W Wilson (B-841)	
TW05	UJT 151S	Littlestone-on-Sea	1977–1978		D-class (IB1); Geoff Pierce (D-903)	
TW05	UJT 151S	Staithes and Runswick	1978–1987		D-class (IB1); Geoff Pierce (D-903)	
TW05	UJT 151S	Relief fleet	1987–1991		D-class (IB1); Geoff Pierce (D-903)	
TW05	UJT 151S	St Ives	1991–1995		D-class (IB1); Geoff Pierce (D-903)	
TW05	UJT 151S	Trearddur Bay	1996–2002		D-class (IB1); Geoff Pierce (D-903)	
TW05	UJT 151S	Mudeford	2002–2006		D-class (IB1); Geoff Pierce (D-903)	
TW05	UJT 151S	Relief fleet	2006–2007		D-class (IB1); Geoff Pierce (D-903)	
TW05	UJT 151S	Weston-super-Mare	2007–2011		D-class (IB1); Geoff Pierce (D-903)	
TW05	UJT 151S	Rhyl	2012–		D-class (IB1); Geoff Pierce (D-903)	
TW06	VRU 611S	Abersoch	1978–1988		D-class (IB1); James and Deanna Adams (D-889)	
TW06	BMN 476L	Peel	1988–1992		D-class (IB1); James and Deanna Adams (D-889)	
TW06	VRU 611S	Largs	1992–1997		D-class (IB1); James and Deanna Adams (D-889)	
TW06	VRU 611S	Kinghorn	1998–2003		D-class (IB1); James and Deanna Adams (D-889)	
TW06	VRU 611S	Relief fleet	2003–2004		D-class (IB1); James and Deanna Adams (D-889)	
TW06	VRU 611S	Barmouth	2004		D-class (IB1); James and Deanna Adams (D-889)	
TW06	VRU 611S	Bude	2004–2007		D-class (IB1); James and Deanna Adams (D-889)	
TW06	VRU 611S	Cleethorpes	2007–		D-class (IB1); James and Deanna Adams (D-889)	
TW07	MAN 49W	Peel	1978–1988		Atlantic 85; Louis Simson (B-866)	
TW07	XLJ 796S	St Bees	1989–1996		Atlantic 85; Louis Simson (B-866)	
TW07	XLJ 796S	Abersoch	1997–2003		Atlantic 85; Louis Simson (B-866)	
TW07	88-D-43711	Skerries	2003–		Atlantic 85; Louis Simson (B-866)	
TW08	D508 RUJ	Littlestone-on-Sea	1979–1994		Atlantic 85; Edith Louise Eastwick (B-844)	
TW08	87-CE-3065	Lough Swilly	1995–1996		Atlantic 85; Edith Louise Eastwick (B-844)	
TW08	D508 RUJ	Beaumaris	1996–2000		Atlantic 85; Edith Louise Eastwick (B-844)	
TW08	87-CE-3065	Kilrush	2001–		Atlantic 85; Edith Louise Eastwick (B-844)	
TW09	PEL 169W	Newbiggin	1981–1992		Atlantic 85; The Missus Barrie (B-915)	
TW09	PEL 169W	Staithes and Runswick	1992–1993		Atlantic 85; The Missus Barrie (B-915)	
TW09	PEL 169W	Atlantic College	1994–2002		Atlantic 85; The Missus Barrie (B-915)	
TW09	PEL 169W	Abersoch	2003–2009		Atlantic 85; The Missus Barrie (B-915)	
TW09	J 93085	St Catherine	2010–2019		Atlantic 85; The Missus Barrie (B-915)	
TW09	PEL 169W	Relief fleet	2019–2022		Atlantic 85; The Missus Barrie (B-915)	
TW09	PEL 169W	Burry Port	2022–		Atlantic 85; The Missus Barrie (B-915)	
TW10	VEL 99X	Hunstanton	1982–1992		Atlantic 85; Glaneley (B-861)	
TW10	VEL 99X	Relief fleet	1992–1994		Atlantic 85; Glaneley (B-861)	
TW10	VEL 99X	Kinghorn	1994–1998		Atlantic 85; Glaneley (B-861)	
TW10	VEL 99X	Relief fleet	1998–2002		Atlantic 85; Glaneley (B-861)	
TW10	VEL 99X	Training(Instow)	2003–2006		Atlantic 85; Glaneley (B-861)	
TW10	VEL 99X	Relief fleet	2006–2008		Atlantic 85; Glaneley (B-861)	
TW10	VEL 99X	Beaumaris	2008–2010		Atlantic 85; Glaneley (B-861)	
TW10	VEL 99X	Relief fleet	2010–2012		Atlantic 85; Glaneley (B-861)	
TW10	VEL 99X	Largs	2012–2013		Atlantic 85; Glaneley (B-861)	
TW10	VEL 99X	Relief fleet	2013–2017		Atlantic 85; Glaneley (B-861)	
TW10	VEL 99X	Appledore	2017–		Atlantic 85; Glaneley (B-861)	
TW11	B251 HUX	Relief fleet	1985–1986		Atlantic 85; David Bradley (B-882)	
TW11	B251 HUX	Redcar	1986–1987		Atlantic 85; David Bradley (B-882)	
TW11	B251 HUX	Staithes and Runswick	1987–1992		Atlantic 85; David Bradley (B-882)	
TW11	B251 HUX	Criccieth	1992–1997		Atlantic 85; David Bradley (B-882)	
TW11	B251 HUX	Largs	1997–1998		Atlantic 85; David Bradley (B-882)	
TW11	B251 HUX	Staithes and Runswick	1998–2003		Atlantic 85; David Bradley (B-882)	
TW11	B251 HUX	Training (Instow)	2006–2007		Atlantic 85; David Bradley (B-882)	
TW11	B251 HUX	Barrow	2007–2008		Atlantic 85; David Bradley (B-882)	
TW11	B251 HUX	Shoreham Harbour	2008–2010		Atlantic 85; David Bradley (B-882)	
TW11	B251 HUX	Relief fleet	2010–2012		Atlantic 85; David Bradley (B-882)	
TW11	B251 HUX	Weston-super-Mare	2012–2015		Atlantic 85; David Bradley (B-882)	
TW11	B251 HUX	Relief fleet	2015–2016		Atlantic 85; David Bradley (B-882)	
TW11	B251 HUX	Lymington	2016–		Atlantic 85; David Bradley (B-882)	
TW12	D508 RUJ	Kinghorn	1987–1994		Atlantic 85; Annette Mary Liddington (B-838)	
TW12	–	St Catherine	1995–1997		Atlantic 85; Annette Mary Liddington (B-838)	
TW12	BPR 667T	Relief fleet	1997–2000		Atlantic 85; Annette Mary Liddington (B-838)	
TW12	BPR 667T	Beaumaris	2000–2008		Atlantic 85; Annette Mary Liddington (B-838)	
TW12	BPR 667T	Hayling Island	2008–2018		Atlantic 85; Annette Mary Liddington (B-838)	
TW12	BPR 667T	Relief fleet	2019–2012		Atlantic 85; Annette Mary Liddington (B-838)	
TW12	BPR 667T	Beaumaris	2021–		Atlantic 85; Annette Mary Liddington (B-838)	
TW13	D948 SAW	Beaumaris	1987–1996		Atlantic 85; Elaine and Don Wilkinson (B-828)	
TW13	D948 SAW	St Catherine	1997–2002		Atlantic 85; Elaine and Don Wilkinson (B-828)	
TW13	D948 SAW	Red Bay	2002–2009		Atlantic 85; Elaine and Don Wilkinson (B-828)	
TW13	D948 SAW	Relief fleet	2009–2010		Atlantic 85; Elaine and Don Wilkinson (B-828)	
TW13	D948 SAW	Beaumaris	2010–2021		Atlantic 85; Elaine and Don Wilkinson (B-828)	
TW13	D948 SAW	Relief fleet	2021–2024		Atlantic 85; Elaine and Don Wilkinson (B-828)	
TW13	D948 SAW	Silloth	2024–		Atlantic 85; Elaine and Don Wilkinson (B-828)	
TW14	D659 TNT	New Brighton	1987–1990		Atlantic 85; James and Helen Mason (B-862)	
TW14	J 15014	St Catherine	1991–1995		Atlantic 85; James and Helen Mason (B-862)	
TW14	87-D-38843	Youghal	1996–1999		Atlantic 85; James and Helen Mason (B-862)	
TW14	D659 TNT	Relief fleet	1999–2001		Atlantic 85; James and Helen Mason (B-862)	
TW14	87-D-38843	Lough Swilly	2001–2007		Atlantic 85; James and Helen Mason (B-862)	
TW14	D659 TNT	Relief fleet	2007–2009		Atlantic 85; James and Helen Mason (B-862)	
TW14	D659 TNT	West Mersea	2009–2019		Atlantic 85; James and Helen Mason (B-862)	
TW14	D659 TNT	Relief fleet	2019–2020		Atlantic 85; James and Helen Mason (B-862)	
TW14	D659 TNT	Burry Port	2020–2022		Atlantic 85; James and Helen Mason (B-862)	
TW14	D659 TNT	Relief fleet	2022–2023		Atlantic 85; James and Helen Mason (B-862)	
TW14	D659 TNT	Tighnabruaich	2023–		Atlantic 85; James and Helen Mason (B-862)	
TW15	E592 WNT	Redcar	1987–1991		Atlantic 85; Derrick Battle (B-829)	
TW15	E592 WNT	Relief fleet	1991–1992		Atlantic 85; Derrick Battle (B-829)	
TW15	E592 WNT	Sheringham	1992–1994		Atlantic 85; Derrick Battle (B-829)	
TW15	E592 WNT	Silloth	1994–1998		Atlantic 85; Derrick Battle (B-829)	
TW15	E592 WNT	Largs	1998–2005		Atlantic 85; Derrick Battle (B-829)	
TW15	E592 WNT	Relief fleet	2005–2007		Atlantic 85; Derrick Battle (B-829)	
TW15	E592 WNT	Appledore	2007–2017		Atlantic 85; Derrick Battle (B-829)	
TW15	E592 WNT	Relief fleet	2017–2018		Atlantic 85; Derrick Battle (B-829)	
TW15	E592 WNT	Hayling Island	2018–		Atlantic 85; Derrick Battle (B-829)	
TW30	L123 HUX	Staithes and Runswick	1993–1998		Atlantic 85; Geoffrey Charles (B-843)	
TW30	L123 HUX	Relief fleet	1998–1999		Atlantic 85; Geoffrey Charles (B-843)	
TW30	L123 HUX	Youghal	1999–2005		Atlantic 85; Geoffrey Charles (B-843)	
TW30	L123 HUX	Relief fleet	2005–2006		Atlantic 85; Geoffrey Charles (B-843)	
TW30	L123 HUX	Lymington	2006–2016		Atlantic 85; Geoffrey Charles (B-843)	
TW30	L123 HUX	Training	2016–2017		Atlantic 85; Geoffrey Charles (B-843)	
TW30	L123 HUX	Relief fleet	2018–2019		Atlantic 85; Geoffrey Charles (B-843)	
TW30	L123 HUX	Red Bay	2019–		Atlantic 85; Geoffrey Charles (B-843)	
TW31	L526 JUJ	Littlestone-on-Sea	1994–1999			
TW31	L526 JUJ	Relief fleet	1999–2004			
TW31	L526 JUJ	Barmouth	2004–2006			
TW31	L526 JUJ	Rhyl	2006–2008			
TW31	L526 JUJ	Relief fleet	2008–2009			
TW31	L526 JUJ	Red Bay	2009–2019			
TW31	L526 JUJ	Relief fleet	2019–2021			
TW31	L526 JUJ	Lough Swilly	2021–2022			
TW31	L526 JUJ	Relief fleet	2022–			
TW32	L161 LAW	Whitstable	1994–2000		Atlantic 85; Tommy Niven (B-836)	
TW32	L161 LAW	Relief fleet	2000–2003		Atlantic 85; Tommy Niven (B-836)	
TW32	L161 LAW	Penlee	2003–2014		Atlantic 85; Tommy Niven (B-836)	
TW32	L161 LAW	Relief fleet	2014–2018		Atlantic 85; Tommy Niven (B-836)	
TW32	L161 LAW	Burry Port	2018–2020		Atlantic 85; Tommy Niven (B-836)	
TW32	L161 LAW	Relief fleet	2020–2022		Atlantic 85; Tommy Niven (B-836)	
TW32	L161 LAW	Kinghorn	2022–		Atlantic 85; Tommy Niven (B-836)	
TW33	M562 OUX	Lough Swilly	1996–2001		Atlantic 85; Henrietta H (B-948)	
TW33	M562 OUX	Relief fleet	2001–2002		Atlantic 85; Henrietta H (B-948)	
TW33	M562 OUX	Rhyl	2002–2006		Atlantic 85; Henrietta H (B-948)	
TW33	M562 OUX	Mudeford	2006–		Atlantic 85; Henrietta H (B-948)	
TW34	M71 RUX	Kilrush	1996–2001		Atlantic 85; Robert and Isobel Mowat (B-873)	
TW34	M71 RUX	Relief fleet	2001–2002		Atlantic 85; Robert and Isobel Mowat (B-873)	
TW34	M71 RUX	Kessock	2002–2015		Atlantic 85; Robert and Isobel Mowat (B-873)	
TW34	M71 RUX	Relief fleet	2015–2016		Atlantic 85; Robert and Isobel Mowat (B-873)	
TW34	M71 RUX	Kessock	2016–		Atlantic 85; Robert and Isobel Mowat (B-873)	
TW35	N506 WNT	Red Bay	1996–2002		Atlantic 85; Alexander (B-875)	
TW35	N506 WNT	Tighnabruaich	2002–2012		Atlantic 85; Alexander (B-875)	
TW35	N506 WNT	Silloth	2013–2024		Atlantic 85; Alexander (B-875)	
TW35	N506 WNT	Relief fleet	2024–2025		Atlantic 85; Alexander (B-875)	
TW35	N506 WNT	Weston-super-Mare	2025–		Atlantic 85; Alexander (B-875)	
TW38	N469 XAW	Skerries	1997–2003		Atlantic 85; Peter and Ann Setten (B-886)	
TW38	N469 XAW	Silloth	2003–2013		Atlantic 85; Peter and Ann Setten (B-886)	
TW38	N469 XAW	Relief fleet	2013–2016		Atlantic 85; Peter and Ann Setten (B-886)	
TW38	N469 XAW	Abersoch	2017–		Atlantic 85; Peter and Ann Setten (B-886)	
TW39	N687 YAW	Lyme Regis	1997–2004		Atlantic 85; Joyce King (B-869)	
TW39	96-D-61119	Clifden	2004–		Atlantic 85; Joyce King (B-869)	
TW40	P472 CUJ	Aberystwyth	1996–2002			
TW40	P472 CUJ	Relief fleet	2002–2003			
TW40	P472 CUJ	Kinghorn	2003–2011			
TW40	P472 CUJ	Weston-super-Mare	2011–2012			
TW40	P472 CUJ	Tighnabruaich	2012–2023			
TW40	P472 CUJ	Weston-super-Mare	2023–2025			
TW40	P472 CUJ	Relief fleet	2025–			
TW41	P301 DAW	Tighnabruaich	1997–2002		Atlantic 85; My Lady Anne (B-884)	
TW41	P301 DAW	Relief fleet	2002–2004		Atlantic 85; My Lady Anne (B-884)	
TW41	P301 DAW	Arran (Lamlash)	2004–2013		Atlantic 85; My Lady Anne (B-884)	
TW41	P301 DAW	Relief fleet	2013–2015		Atlantic 85; My Lady Anne (B-884)	
TW41	P301 DAW	Portishead	2015–2024		Atlantic 85; My Lady Anne (B-884)	
TW41	P301 DAW	Relief fleet	2024–2025		Atlantic 85; My Lady Anne (B-884)	
TW41	P301 DAW	Portishead	2025–		Atlantic 85; My Lady Anne (B-884)	
TW42	97-G-8631	Clifden	1998–2004		Atlantic 85; Gordon and Phil (B-890)	
TW42	R473 UUX	Relief fleet	2004–2005		Atlantic 85; Gordon and Phil (B-890)	
TW42	97-G-8631	Youghal	2005–		Atlantic 85; Gordon and Phil (B-890)	
TW43	S540 UNT	Hayling Island	1998–2008		Atlantic 85; Just George (B-879)	
TW43	S540 UNT	Relief fleet	2008–2009		Atlantic 85; Just George (B-879)	
TW43	S540 UNT	Abersoch	2009–2017		Atlantic 85; Just George (B-879)	
TW43	S540 UNT	Relief fleet	2018–2019		Atlantic 85; Just George (B-879)	
TW43	S540 UNT	West Mersea	2019–		Atlantic 85; Just George (B-879)	
TW44	S193 RUJ	Appledore	2000–2007		Atlantic 85; Hereford Endeavour (B-847)	
TW44	S193 RUJ	Relief fleet	2007–2008		Atlantic 85; Hereford Endeavour (B-847)	
TW44	S193 RUJ	Rhyl	2008–2010		Atlantic 85; Hereford Endeavour (B-847)	
TW44	S193 RUJ	Burry Port	2010–2018		Atlantic 85; Hereford Endeavour (B-847)	
TW44	S193 RUJ	Relief fleet	2018–2020		Atlantic 85; Hereford Endeavour (B-847)	
TW44	S193 RUJ	Trearddur Bay	2020–		Atlantic 85; Hereford Endeavour (B-847)	
TW47	T315 FLG	Lymington	2000–2006		Atlantic 85; Davdot (B-958)	
TW47	T315 FLG	Relief fleet	2006–2007		Atlantic 85; Davdot (B-958)	
TW47	99-D-87952	Lough Swilly	2007–2021		Atlantic 85; Davdot (B-958)	
TW47	99-D-87952	Relief fleet	2021–2022		Atlantic 85; Davdot (B-958)	
TW47	99-D-87952	Lough Swilly	2022–		Atlantic 85; Davdot (B-958)	
TW48	V281 EUJ	West Mersea	2000–2009			
TW48	V281 EUJ	Relief fleet	2009–2010			
TW48	V281 EUJ	Trearddur Bay	2010–2011			
TW48	V281 EUJ	Relief fleet	2011–2012			
TW48	V281 EUJ	Southwold	2012–2013			
TW48	V281 EUJ	Arran (Lamlash)	2013–2025			
TW48	V281 EUJ	Relief	2025–2026			
TW48	J86255	St Catherine	2026-			
TW63	DS13 LGW	Largs	2013–2025			
TW63	DS13 LGW	Relief fleet	2025–			
TW64	HG63 VAO	Lyme Regis	2014–2023		Atlantic 85; R. A. Wilson (B-854)	
TW64	HG63 VAO	Relief fleet	2023–2025		Atlantic 85; R. A. Wilson (B-854)	
TW64	HG63 VAO	Largs	2025–		Atlantic 85; R. A. Wilson (B-854)	

== See also ==
- Fowler Challenger III launch tractor
- New Holland TC45 launch tractor
- Talus MB-H launch tractor
- Talus MB-4H launch tractor
- Talus Atlantic 85 DO-DO launch carriage
