= Portishead Lifeboat Station =

RNLI lifeboat station in North Somerset

- Flag of the RNLI

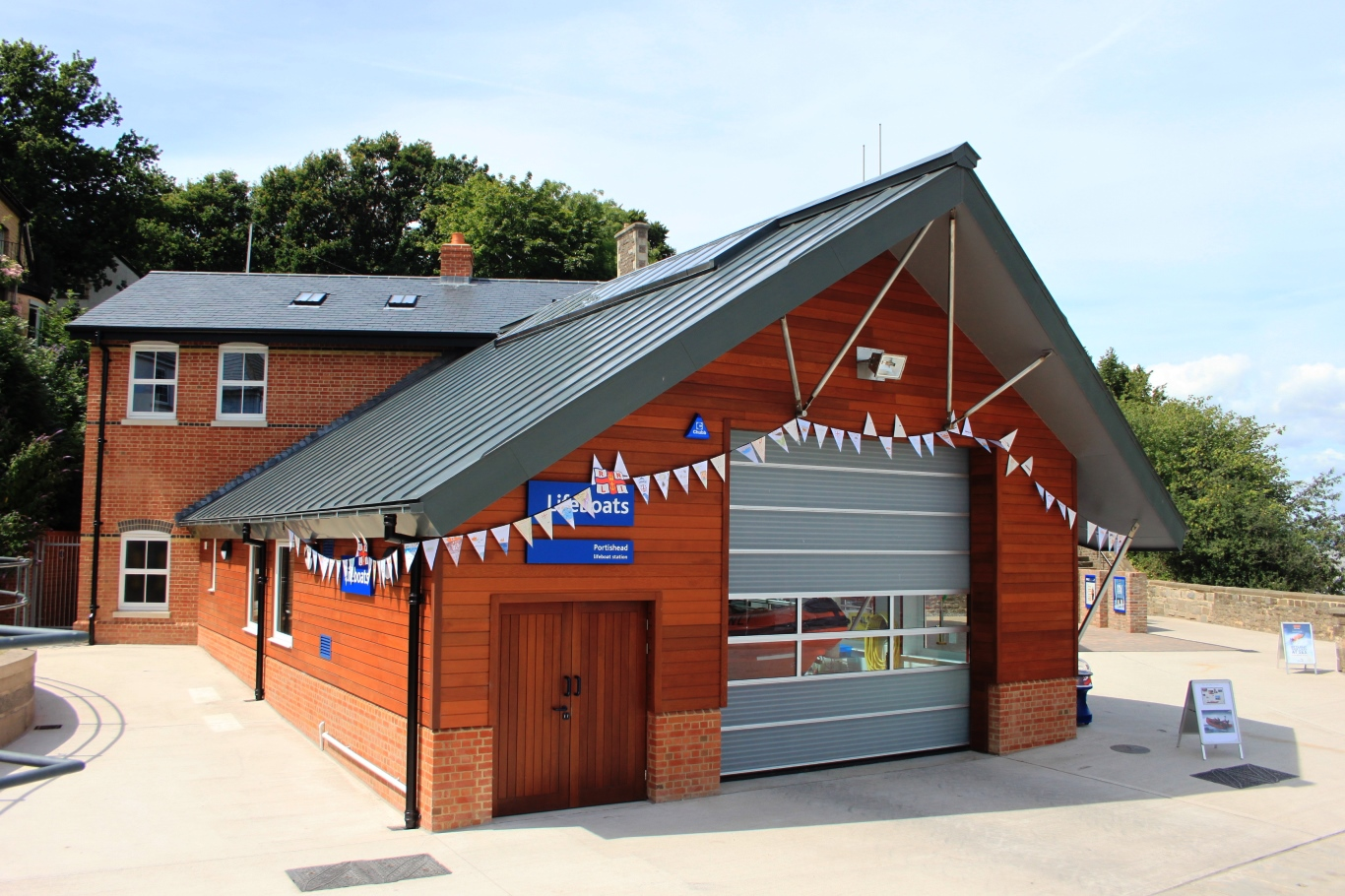
- Portishead Lifeboat Station

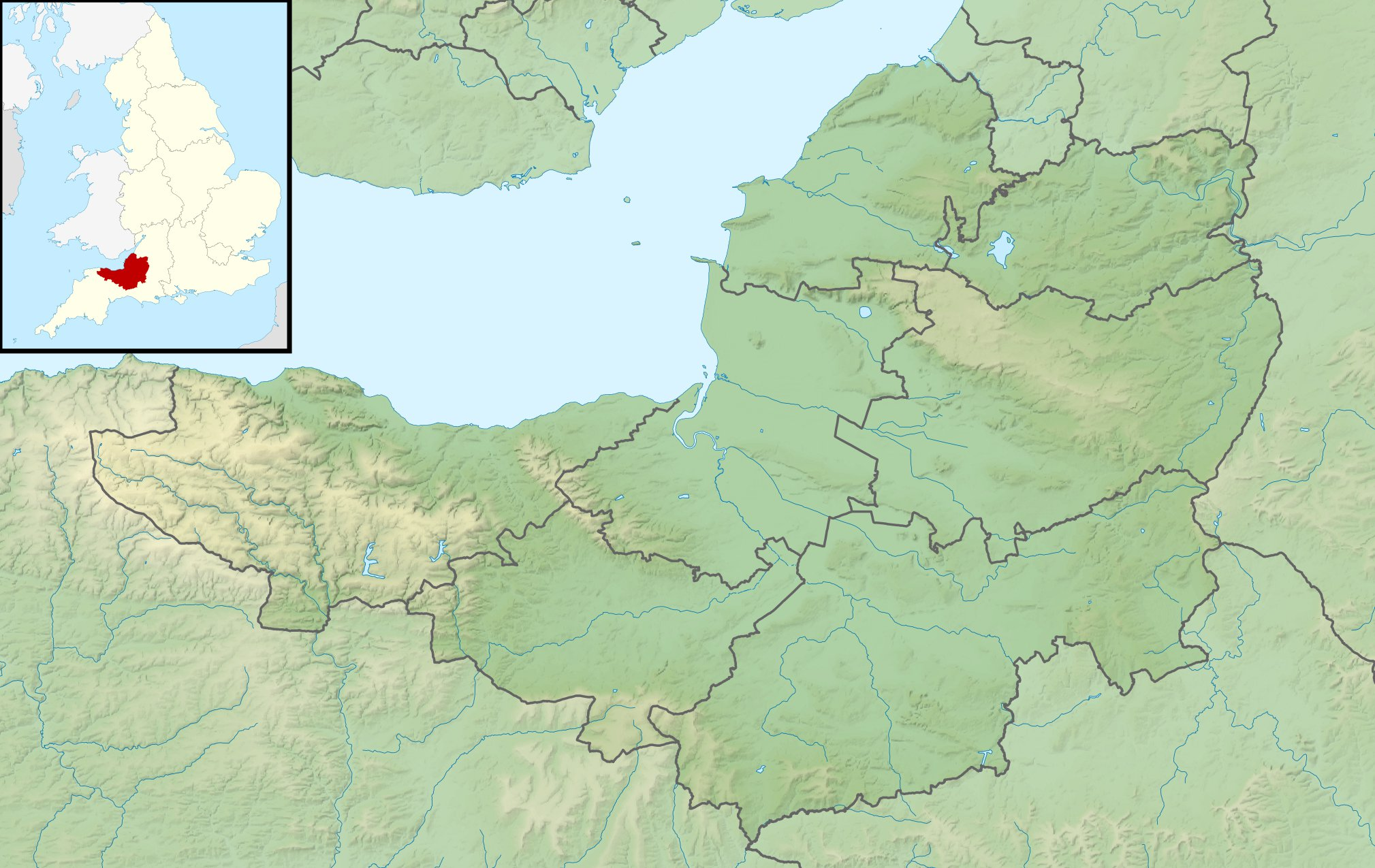
- Location within Somerset
- Former names: Portishead Lifeboat Trust

General information
- Type: Lifeboat station
- Location: Pier Road, Portishead, North Somerset, BS20 7EA, England
- Coordinates: 51°29′38″N 2°45′25.2″W
- Opened: Independent service 1996; RNLI 2015
- Owner: RNLI

Website
- RNLI Portishead Lifeboat Station

Portishead Lifeboat Station is located at Pier Road, in the town of Portishead, located on the Severn Estuary in North Somerset.

A lifeboat was stationed at Portishead in 1996 by the Portishead Lifeboat Trust (PLT), an independent lifeboat, operating from Sugar Loaf Beach. Management of the station was taken over by the Royal National Lifeboat Institution (RNLI) in 2015, following construction of a new lifeboat station, opened adjacent to Portishead Pier.

== History ==
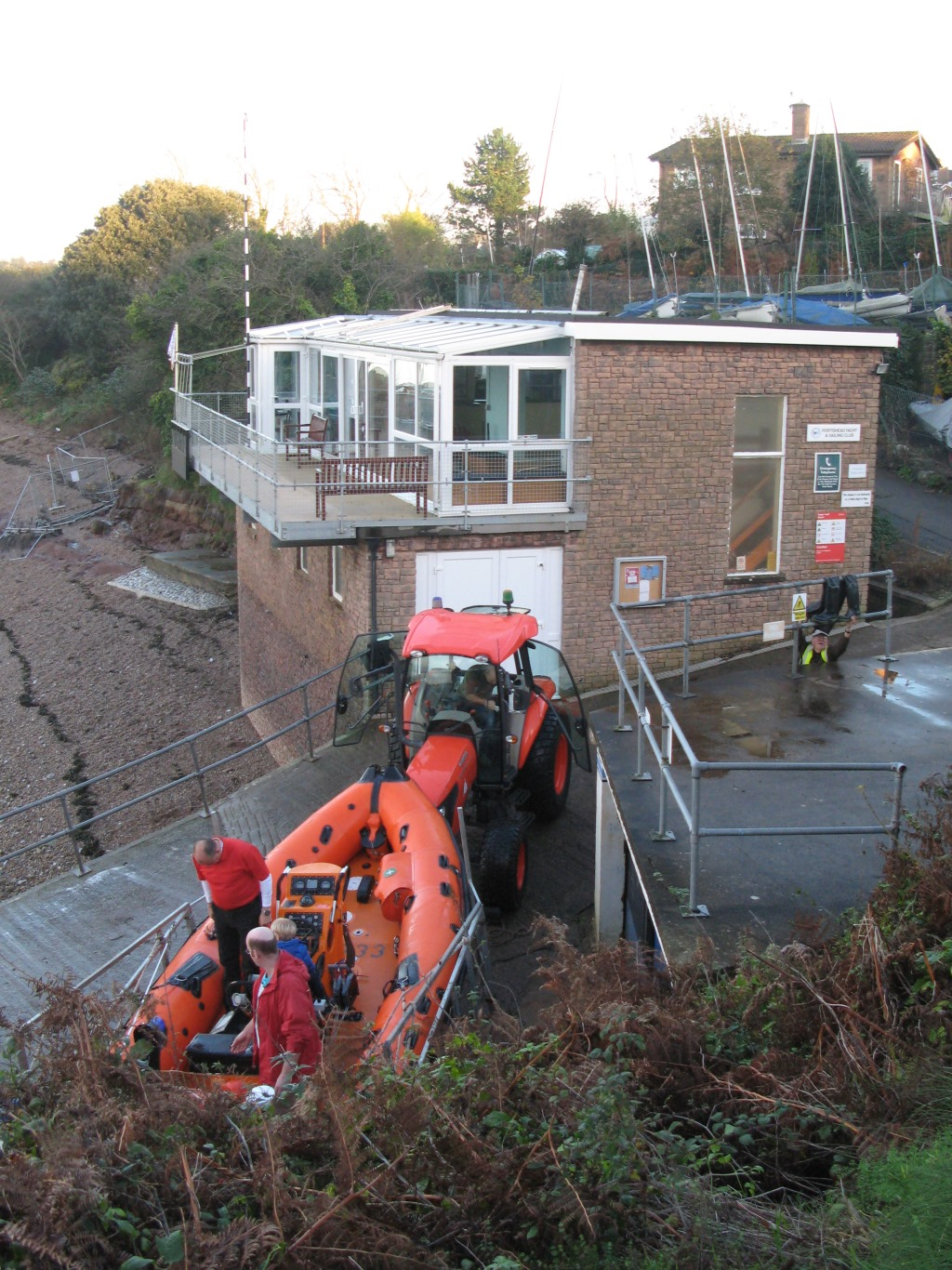
Portishead Lifeboat Trust's Brandy Hole at the Yacht Club

A rescue service in the waters off Portishead was provided from 1967 until 1992 by Portishead Yacht Club. The Portishead Lifeboat Trust was established as a charity in 1995 to provide a replacement service. Their first lifeboat was operational from 6 October 1996, using a base at the Yacht Club's premises at Sugar Loaf Beach, to the south of the town.

On 28 August 2008 the lifeboat crew were undertaking a training exercise, when the lifeboat was damaged by heavy seas. Their 'mayday' was answered by the RNLI lifeboat from Weston-super-Mare, and the Severn Area Rescue Association (SARA) lifeboat. The Portishead Lifeboat Trust borrowed a lifeboat from SARA while repairs were undertaken by Ribcraft. This lifeboat was later replaced with one leased from the RNLI.

In 2011 the Portishead Lifeboat Trust approached the RNLI to discuss them being adopted by that organisation so as to give a more secure long-term future. The RNLI agreed to this but subject to building a new lifeboat station with better facilities. This was agreed in 2013 and the following year, construction of the new station was started. The RNLI asked that the local community should raise £232,000 towards the costs but this was significantly exceeded when an anonymous donor came forward with £500,000.

The Portishead Lifeboat Trust was called out more than 300 times to assist nearly 500 people, and saving 14 lives. In 2014 they could call upon 34 crew members, all of whom were volunteers.

The RNLI's building was completed early in 2015 and the lifeboat was stationed in it from 24 April 2015.

== Area of operation ==
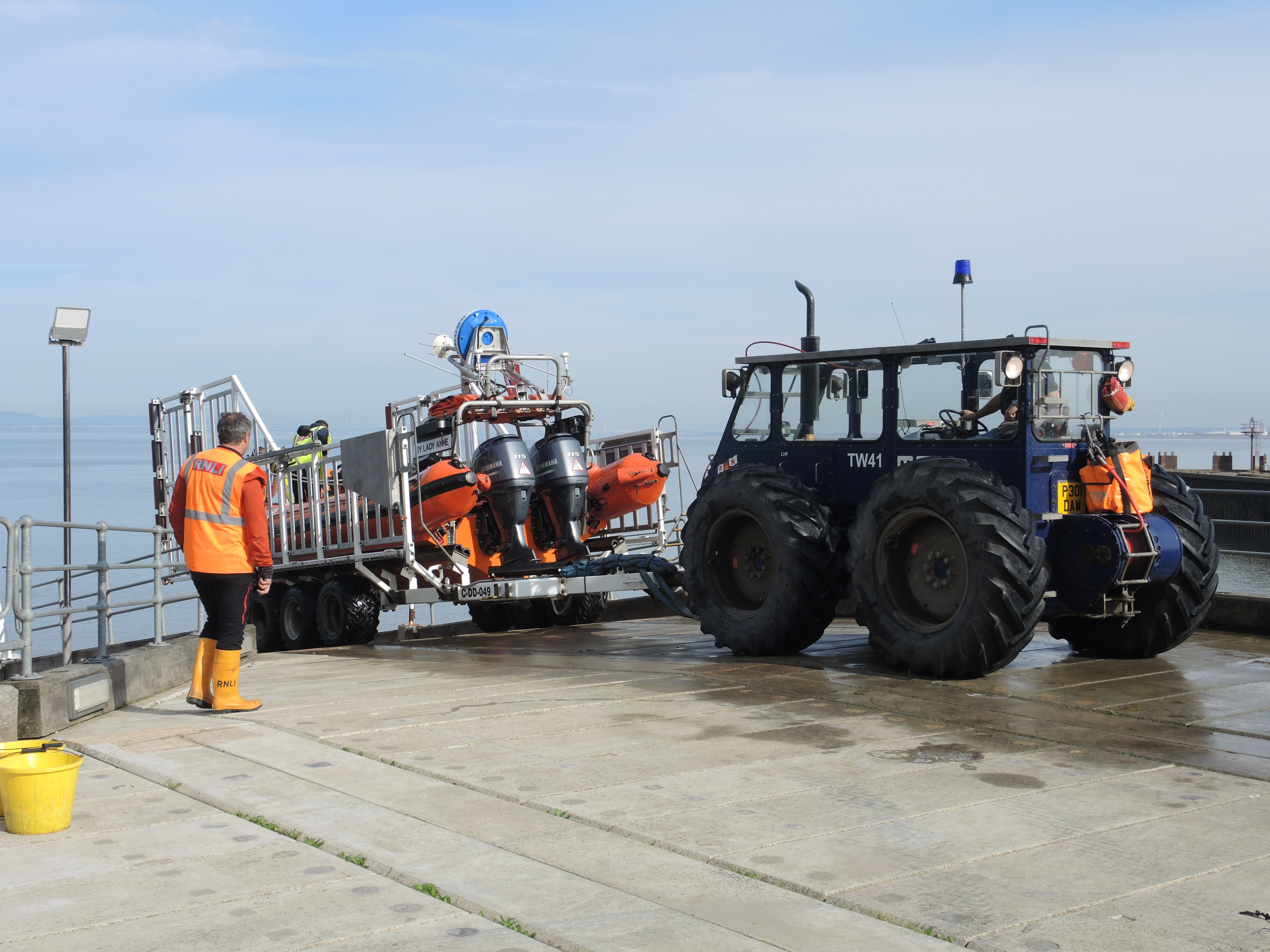
Portishead B-class (Atlantic 85) My Lady Anne (B-884) and launch tractor

Portishead's Atlantic 85 inshore lifeboat (ILB) has a range of 3 hours and top speed of 25 kn (46 km/h). It covers an area of the Bristol Channel around the River Avon, including the Avon itself running up into the city of Bristol.

Adjacent inshore lifeboats are provided by the RNLI at Weston-super-Mare to the south, across the Severn estuary at Penarth, and by the independent Severn Area Rescue Association to the north. The nearest all-weather lifeboat is based at Barry Dock.

== Portishead lifeboats ==
The station currently operates the B-class (Atlantic 85) lifeboat My Lady Anne (B-884) which has been here since 2015.

=== Portishead Lifeboat Trust ===
At Portishead	Op. No.	Name	Model	Comments
1996–2003	–	Portishead Lifeboat	RIB	6.5 m (21 ft) boat.
2003–2010	–	Denbar Sage	RIB	6.5 m (21 ft) boat.
2011–2013	B-729	Rose West	Atlantic 75	RNLI B-class ILB, first stationed at Kilrush in 1996.
2013–2015	B-733	Brandy Hole	Atlantic 75	RNLI B-class ILB, first stationed at Burnham-on-Crouch in 1997.

=== RNLI ===
==== B-class ====
At Portishead	Op. No.	Name	Model	Comments
2015	B-759	Spirit of Clovelly	Atlantic 75	First stationed at Clovelly in 1999.
2015–	B-884	My Lady Anne	Atlantic 85	

==== Launch and recovery tractors ====
Op. No.	Reg. No.	Type	On station	Comments
TW41	P301 DAW	Talus MB-764 County	2015–2024	
TW02	LRU 581P	Talus MB-764 County	2024–2025	
TW41	P301 DAW	Talus MB-764 County	2025–	

== See also ==
- List of RNLI stations
- List of former RNLI stations
- Independent lifeboats in Britain and Ireland
- Royal National Lifeboat Institution lifeboats
