= Kilrush Lifeboat Station =

RNLI lifeboat station in County Clare, Ireland

- Kilrush Lifeboat Station in 2026

- Location within Ireland

General information
- Type: RNLI Lifeboat Station
- Location: 9 Merchants Quay, Cappagh, Kilrush, County Clare, V15 NX67, Ireland
- Coordinates: 52°37′47.9″N 9°30′02.1″W
- Opened: 10 April 1996
- Owner: Royal National Lifeboat Institution

Website
- Kilrush RNLI Lifeboat Station

Kilrush Lifeboat Station is located at on Cappagh Road, near the entrance to Kilrush Creek Marina in Kilrush, a town on the northern shore of the River Shannon estuary, in County Clare, Ireland.

A lifeboat station was established at Kilrush in 1996 by the Royal National Lifeboat Institution (RNLI).

The station currently operates the B-class (Atlantic 85) Inshore lifeboat, Edith Louise Eastwick (B-844), on station since 2010.

== History ==
In the Summer 1993 edition of RNLI journal 'The Lifeboat', the RNLI executive committee announced that Kilrush was being considered as a location for a new lifeboat station, and that preliminary work on the establishment of the station was already in hand.

At a subsequent meeting of the committee on 24 November 1993, it was resolved that an Inshore lifeboat station be established at Kilrush on the Shannon estuary, in response to a marked rise in the amount of leisure and commercial activity.

Construction of a new boathouse and slipway was started in 1995, which featured a workshop, retail outlet, crew facilities, and boat hall for the lifeboat, carriage and Talus MB-764 County launch tractor.

A B-class (Atlantic 21) Inshore lifeboat Long Life I (B-555) from the relief fleet was temporarily placed at the station on 10 April 1996, soon followed by Wolverson X-Ray (B-590). On 9 October 1996, the station received their permanent lifeboat, the larger Atlantic 75-class Rose West (B-729), which had been funded from the legacy of Miss R. D. West. The lifeboat would serve at Kilrush for 14 years, before being withdrawn to the relief fleet, and later transferred on loan to Portishead Lifeboat Trust.

On the 19 August 2010, a new B-class (Atlantic 85) was placed on station at Kilrush. The lifeboat, 'costing €185,000, had been funded from the legacy of English economist Marjorie Eileen Henrietta Grice-Hutchinson MBE, Baroness von Schlippenbach, who died in 2003 in Málaga, but was born and grew up in Eastbourne.

Encouraged to support the RNLI at an early age by her mother, visiting Eastbourne Lifeboat Station, the Baroness decided that the best way to honour her late mother, was in the provision of a new lifeboat in her name. At a ceremony at Kilrush lifeboat station in May 2011, marine journalist Tom MacSweeney named the lifeboat Edith Louise Eastwick (B-844).

In weather conditions of gale force 7–8, the Kilrush lifeboat Edith Louise Eastwick was launched on the afternoon of 23 February 2013 to the Foynes area, to reports of a boat adrift with engine failure, with five people aboard. The lifeboat was on scene within 25 minutes, and the five people were transferred to the lifeboat. One crewman went aboard the boat to set up a tow, and all five and boat were recovered to Tarbert Pier within an hour. Lifeboat helm Tom Blunnie praised the work of his crew, noting that the crew training paid dividends in such conditions.

On a two-day tour of lifeboat stations in Kerry, Tipperary and Clare, the station was visited on Tuesday 30 May 2017 by RNLI President H.R.H. The Duke of Kent, where he met the Kilrush lifeboat operations team, lifeboat crew, and members of the local fundraising branch. The visit was concluded with the planting of an Irish Yew tree.

== Kilrush lifeboats ==
=== B class lifeboats ===
Op.No. (Note: Op. No. is the RNLI's Operational Number of the boat carried on the hull.)	Name	On station	Class	Comments
B-555	Long Life I	1996	B-class (Atlantic 21)	
B-590	Wolverson X-Ray	1996	B-class (Atlantic 21)	
B-729	Rose West	1996–2010	B-class (Atlantic 75)	
B-844	Edith Louise Eastwick	2010–	B-class (Atlantic 85)	

=== Launch and recovery tractors ===
Op.No.	Reg.No.	Type	On station	Comments
TW34	M71 RUX	Talus MB-764 County	1996–2001	
TW08	87-CE-3065	Talus MB-764 County	2001–	

== See also ==
- List of RNLI stations
- List of former RNLI stations
- Royal National Lifeboat Institution lifeboats

== Sources ==
- Leonard, Richie; Denton, Tony (2026). Lifeboat Enthusiasts Handbook 2026. Lifeboats Enthusiasts' Society.
