= Kessock Lifeboat Station =

RNLI lifeboat station in Highland, Scotland

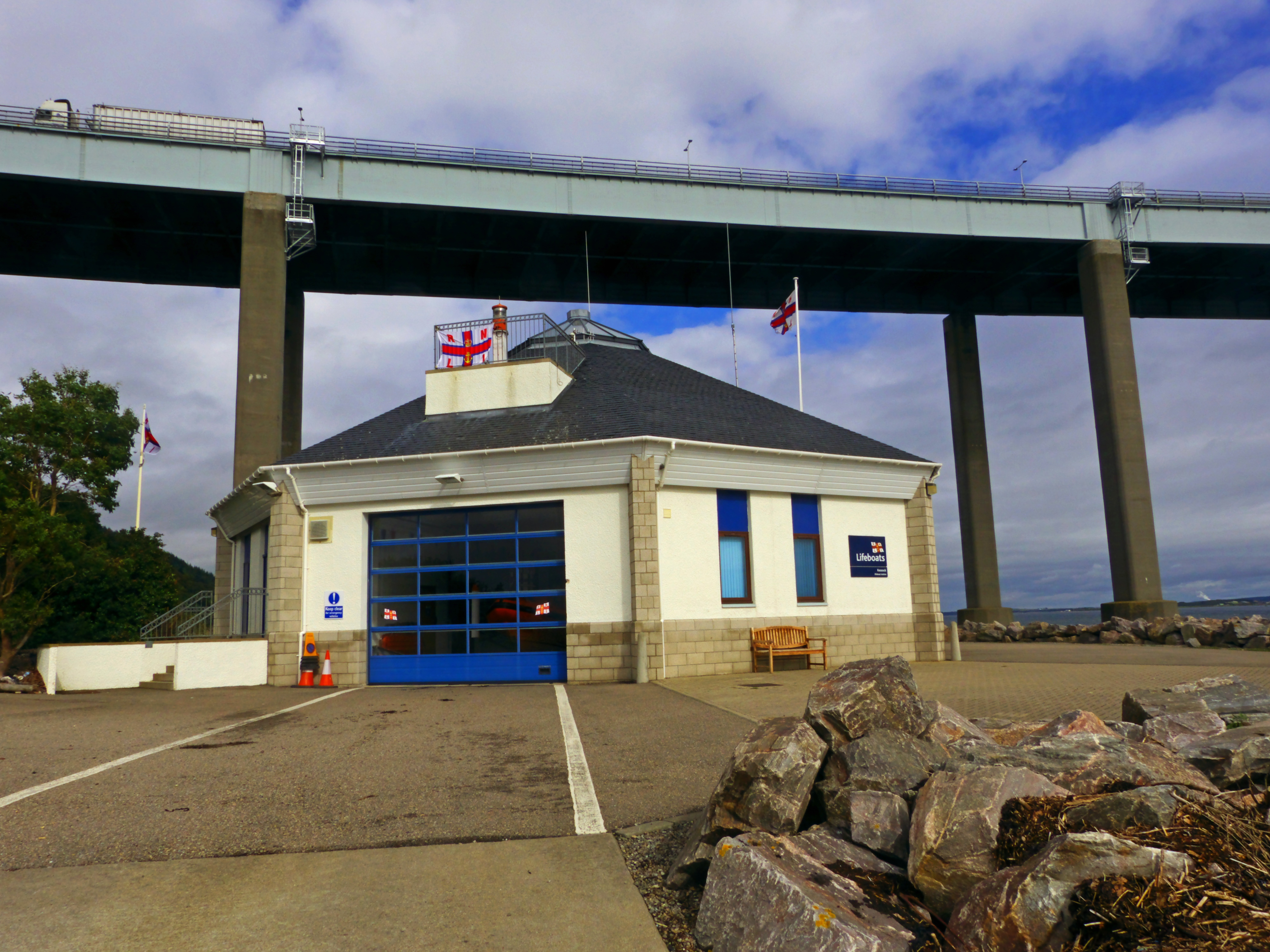
- Kessock Lifeboat Station

- Location within Highland
- Former names: North Kessock Lifeboat Station

General information
- Type: RNLI Lifeboat Station
- Location: Craigton Point, Point Rd, North Kessock, Inverness, Highland, IV1 3YQ, Scotland
- Coordinates: 57°30′03.4″N 4°14′04.9″W
- Opened: 1993
- Owner: Royal National Lifeboat Institution

Website
- Kessock RNLI Lifeboat Station

Kessock Lifeboat Station is located directly under the A9 Kessock Bridge, on the north shore of Beauly Firth at Craigton Point, North Kessock, 2 miles (3.2 km) north of Inverness, in the Highland region of Scotland.

A lifeboat station was established at North Kessock in 1993 by the Royal National Lifeboat Institution (RNLI).

Naming ceremony for B-class (Atlantic 85) Inshore lifeboat Robert and Isobel Mowat (B-873), 7 June 2014

The station currently operates a B-class (Atlantic 85) Inshore lifeboat, Robert and Isobel Mowat (B-873), on station since 2014.

== History ==
In 1822, the Caledonian Canal was constructed by Thomas Telford. This 60-mile (97 km) route up the Great Glen Fault between Oban and Inverness allowed vessels of a modest size to cut off the dangerous route around north-west Scotland through the Pentland Firth and around Cape Wrath, instead emerging out onto the Beauly and Moray Firth to the North Sea.

For many years, the waters around the northern entrance to the canal had been served by lifeboats stationed at Lossiemouth, Nairn and Cromarty, but these had been successively closed as demand for the service declined, the last one closing in 1968. In 1992, with leisure traffic increasing both locally and on the Caledonian canal, with the nearest (All-weather) lifeboat some 20 miles (32 km) away at Invergordon, the RNLI Management Committee decided to establish a new Inshore lifeboat station at North Kessock. This was ideally situated between the Beauly and Moray Firths, just to the east of the Caledonian Canal sea lock at Clachnaharry.

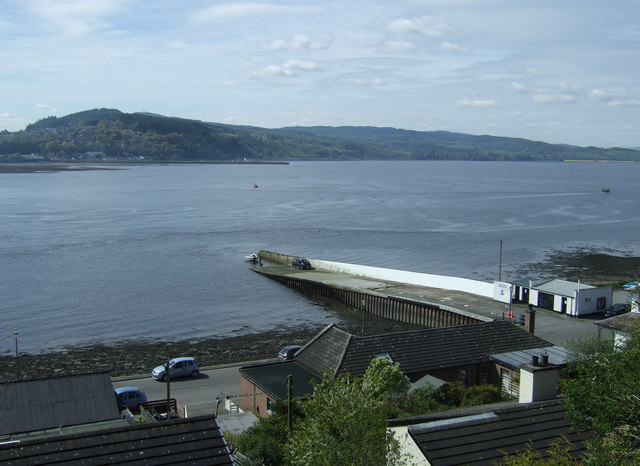
North Kessock Ferry slipway and former ticket office

On 5 June 1993, the RNLI placed the D-class (EA16) relief lifeboat (D-396) at North Kessock, for a one-year evaluation period. The Kessock Ferry ceased operating in 1982, following construction of the Kessock Bridge, and the lifeboat was stored on the old slipway, with the former ticket office on Main Street being used for crew kit. Initially, the lifeboat was on station for the summer season.

The following year, North Kessock Lifeboat Station was established as a permanent all-year-round station, and a new D-class (EA16) lifeboat arrived on 10 May 1994. Funded by the late Ronald W. J. Wood, the boat was named Margaret and Fiona Wood (D-459) at a ceremony on 17 September 1994.

After eight years of operations, a purpose built boathouse was constructed a little further to the east at Craigton Point, designed to accommodate a much larger twin-engined Atlantic-class lifeboat and its Talus MB-764 County launch tractor. Also providing much improved crew facilities, the building was completed in September 2001, at a cost of £481,500. The station would then receive the B-class (Atlantic 75) relief lifeboat Lucy Beryl (B-709) for a period of training, which arrived on station on 18 October 2001. Completing a decision dating back to 1999, the station name was changed to Kessock Lifeboat Station.

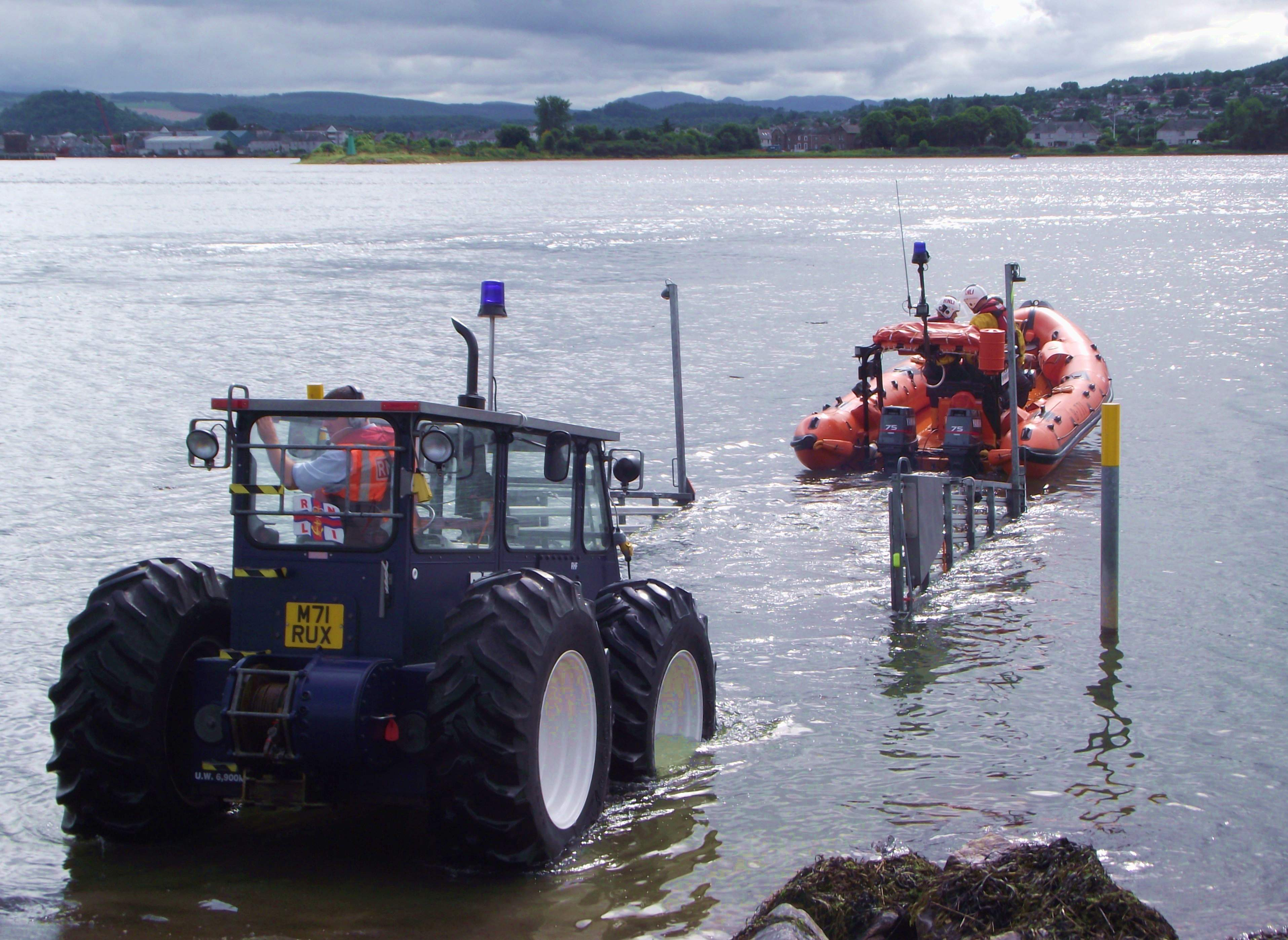
Launching Kessock lifeboat Moray Dolphin (B-771)

At a ceremony on Friday 7 June 2002, Kessock boathouse was officially opened, and the new B-class (Atlantic 75) lifeboat was named Moray Dolphin (B-771). The lifeboat was funded by an anonymous donor from Inverness.

On 11 January 2014, Moray Dolphin (B-771) was withdrawn to the relief fleet, and Kessock received the new larger B-class (Atlantic 85) lifeboat. A naming ceremony was held on Saturday 7 June 2014. Funded from a bequest of £200,000 from the late Dr Isobel Stewart Fenton, the lifeboat was named Robert & Isobel Mowat (B-873), in memory of her father and mother.

The 25th anniversary of the station was celebrated in 2018. In that period, the lifeboat had been launched 700 times, rescued 320 people, and saved 36 lives.

Kessock lifeboat crew were called out three times on one day in 2021. At 05:42, the lifeboat was called to assist in a multi-agency search. Then at 14:05, the lifeboat was launched to the aid of a yacht with a fouled propeller, and shortly afterwards, it was called out for a third time, to another yacht, which was aground near Longman Beacon.

== Kessock lifeboats ==
=== Inshore lifeboats ===
==== D class ====
Op.No. (Note: Op.No. is the RNLI's Operational Number of the boat or vehicle carried on the hull.)	Name	On station	Class	Comments
D-396	Unnamed	1993−1994	D-class (EA16)	
D-459	Margaret and Fiona Wood	1994−2001	D-class (EA16)	

==== B class ====
Op.No.	Name	On station	Class	Comments
B-709	Lucy Beryl	2001−2002	B-class (Atlantic 75)	
B-771	The Moray Dolphin	2002−2014	B-class (Atlantic 75)	
B-873	Robert and Isobel Mowat	2014−	B-class (Atlantic 85)	

=== Launch and recovery tractors ===
Op.No.	Reg.No.	Type	On station	Comments
TW34	M71 RUX	Talus MB-764 County	2002–2015	
TW03	RLJ 367R	Talus MB-764 County	2015–2016	
TW34	M71 RUX	Talus MB-764 County	2016–	

== See also ==
- List of RNLI stations
- List of former RNLI stations
- Royal National Lifeboat Institution lifeboats
