= Lymington Lifeboat Station =

RNLI lifeboat station in Hampshire, England

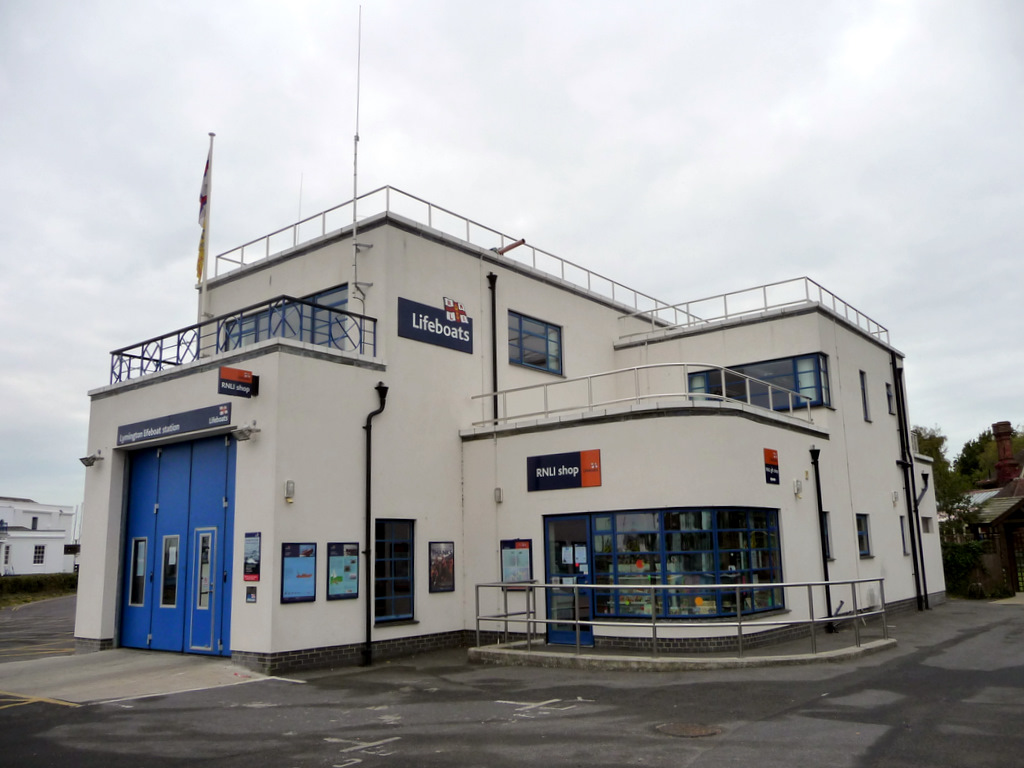
- Lymington Lifeboat Station

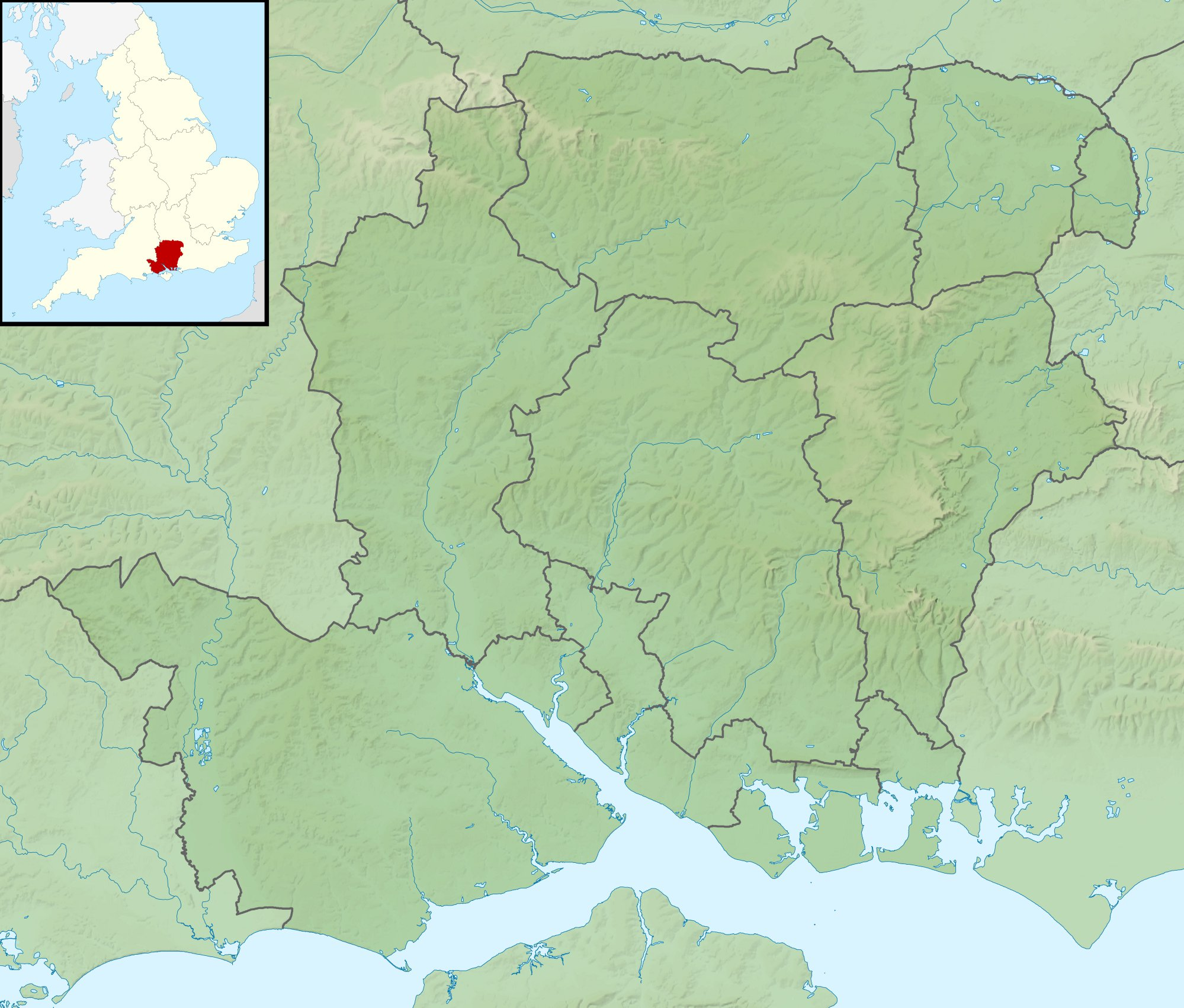
- Location within Hampshire

General information
- Type: RNLI Lifeboat Station
- Location: Bath Road, Lymington, Hampshire, CA14 2JH, England
- Coordinates: 50°45′13.8″N 1°31′44.8″W
- Opened: May 1965
- Owner: Royal National Lifeboat Institution

Website
- Lymington RNLI Lifeboat Station

Lymington Lifeboat Station is located at the end of Bath Road, on the west bank of the Lymington River in Lymington, a port town on the Solent, in the New Forest district of Hampshire, England.

An Inshore lifeboat was first stationed in Lymington by the Royal National Lifeboat Institution (RNLI) in May 1965.

The station currently operates a B-class (Atlantic 85) Inshore lifeboat, David Bradley (B-882), on station since 2015.

== History ==
In 1964, in response to an increasing amount of water-based leisure activity, the RNLI placed 25 small fast Inshore lifeboats around the country. These were easily launched with just a few people, ideal to respond quickly to local emergencies.

More stations were opened, and in May 1965 a lifeboat station was established at Lymington, with the arrival of a D-class (RFD PB16) Inshore lifeboat, the unnamed (D-41).

The D-class (RFD PB16) lifeboat (D-181) was withdrawn in 1973, and after a brief period with the larger twin-engined trial Atlantic-class lifeboat (B-6), the B-class (Atlantic 21) lifeboat Surrey Forester (B-519) was placed on service in August 1973.

A purpose-built boathouse was constructed in 1978 in a cost of £12,000. At a ceremony on 2 June, the boathouse was officially opened by Clare Francis MBE, the first woman to captain a boat on the Whitbread Around the World race. Francis was presented with an RNLI jersey and invited to be an honorary member of the Lymington lifeboat crew.

At 18:30 on 17 December 1981, Harbourmaster and lifeboat helm Alan Coster was alerted by the Sealink Ferry office, to a fishing boat Al Mor, in trouble in gale force 7 conditions, near the mouth of the Lymington River. With his assistant Simon Chalk, another lifeboat crew member, they set out in the harbour launch to investigate. Soon realising that the lifeboat would be required, they returned, and the Lymington lifeboat Surrey Forester (B-519) was launched at 17:10. After several attempts, it was clear that the lifeboat could not get close enough. Coster, being the only crew member in a dry suit, handed over control of the helm, and under the floodlights of the Sealink Ferry, swam to the vessel, leading the two crew ashore through the marshes, to rendezvous with the lifeboat 1/2 mile (0.80 km) away at Pylewell. Helm Alan Coster was awarded the RNLI Bronze Medal, the other two lifeboat crew members accorded 'Medal Service Certificates'.

The station would receive the new improved B-class (Atlantic 75) lifeboat in June 2002. Funded by Mrs Iris Lovelock, Victor “Danny” Lovelock (B-784) replaced the 16-year-old Atlantic 21 lifeboat Frank and Mary Atkinson (B-566).

Just three months later, Helm Nicolas Hayward would receive 'The Thanks of the Institution inscribed on Vellum' for a service on 9 September 2002. Before launching at 15:00 into force 9 conditions at the operating limits of the lifeboat, Helm Hayward checked with the crew that they were prepared to launch into such conditions. The 6.5 metres (21 ft) yacht Piciess had been caught out by severe weather that had not been forecast, and had suffered a broken mast and engine failure. On arrival at the vessel, experienced crew member Barry Down went aboard to secure a towline. Soon after the tow was started, he had concerns for one of the crew, so the tow was let go, and the lifeboat transferred the man to another larger yacht, Golden Corn, which had been standing by. The tow was regained, and due to the conditions, all three vessels headed to Cowes. Helm Hayward reported that the lifeboat crew were bruised after taking quite a beating during the 3-hour service, but praised the new lifeboat over the old one. Barry Down, Robin Mursell and Austin Honeysett each received 'A Framed Letter of Thanks signed by the Chairman of the Institution'.

After discussions lasting nine years, the site for the new Lymington boathouse was chosen, to be on the old site. The new lifeboat house, costing £678,284 was constructed, and completed on 6 July 2006. The building has sometimes been nicknamed the 'Odeon', as it was designed in a 1930s style, in keeping with the surroundings. A retail shop was included, and local clubs can hire any vacant meeting rooms. Local resident Rufus Eyre funded state-of-the-art training facilities; a dedicated room with plasma screen, projector and laptop, and a computer network throughout the building. The station can now assume control of the numerous Solent area webcams, and can monitor rescues from the crew room.

== Station honours ==
The following are awards made at Lymington.

- RNLI Bronze Medal

Alan Percival Coster, Helm – 1981

- Medal Service Certificate

Peter E. T. Harvey, crew member – 1981
Simon G. Chalk, crew member – 1981

- The Thanks of the Institution inscribed on Vellum

Nicolas Hayward, Helm – 2002

- A Framed Letter of Thanks signed by the Chairman of the Institution

Alan Coster, Helm – 1988
Michael Crowe, crew member – 1988

Barry Down, crew member – 2002
Robin Mursell, crew member – 2002
Austin Honeysett, crew member – 2002

- Letters of appreciation signed by the Director of the Institution

Nicholas Hayward, crew member – 1988
Helicopter crew – 1988

- Framed Commendation signed by the Director of Lifesaving Operations

Kevin Coster, Helm – 2021
Philip Baker, crew member – 2021
Declan O'Riordan, crew member – 2021
Greg Pachany, crew member – 2021

- Member, Order of the British Empire (MBE)

Nicholas Hayward, Volunteer Station Mechanic and Deputy Launching Authority – 2025KBH

== Lymington lifeboats ==
=== Inshore lifeboats ===
Op.No. (Note: Op. No. is the RNLI's Operational Number of the boat or vehicle carried on the hull.)	Name	On station	Class	Comments
D-41	Unnamed	1965–1969	D-class (RFD PB16)	
D-181	Unnamed	1970–1973	D-class (RFD PB16)	
B-6	Unnamed	1973	Trial Atlantic-class	
B-519	Surrey Forester	1973–1986	B-class (Atlantic 21)	
B-566	Frank and Mary Atkinson	1986–2002	B-class (Atlantic 21)	
B-784	Victor "Danny" Lovelock	2002–2015	B-class (Atlantic 75)	
B-882	David Bradley	2015–	B-class (Atlantic 85)	

=== Launch and recovery tractors ===
Op. No.	Reg. No.	Type	On station	Comments
TW47	T315 FLG	Talus MB-764 County	2000–2006	
TW30	L123 HUX	Talus MB-764 County	2006–2016	
TW11	B251 HUX	Talus MB-764 County	2016–	

== See also ==
- List of RNLI stations
- List of former RNLI stations
- Royal National Lifeboat Institution lifeboats
