= Kyle of Lochalsh Lifeboat Station =

RNLI Lifeboat station in Highland, Scotland

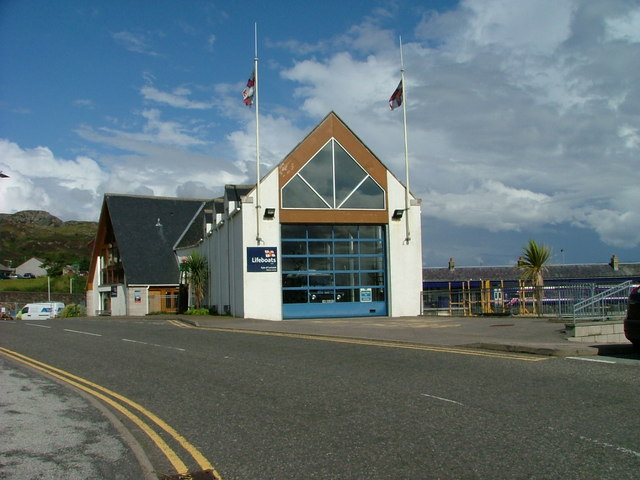
- Kyle of Lochalsh Lifeboat Station

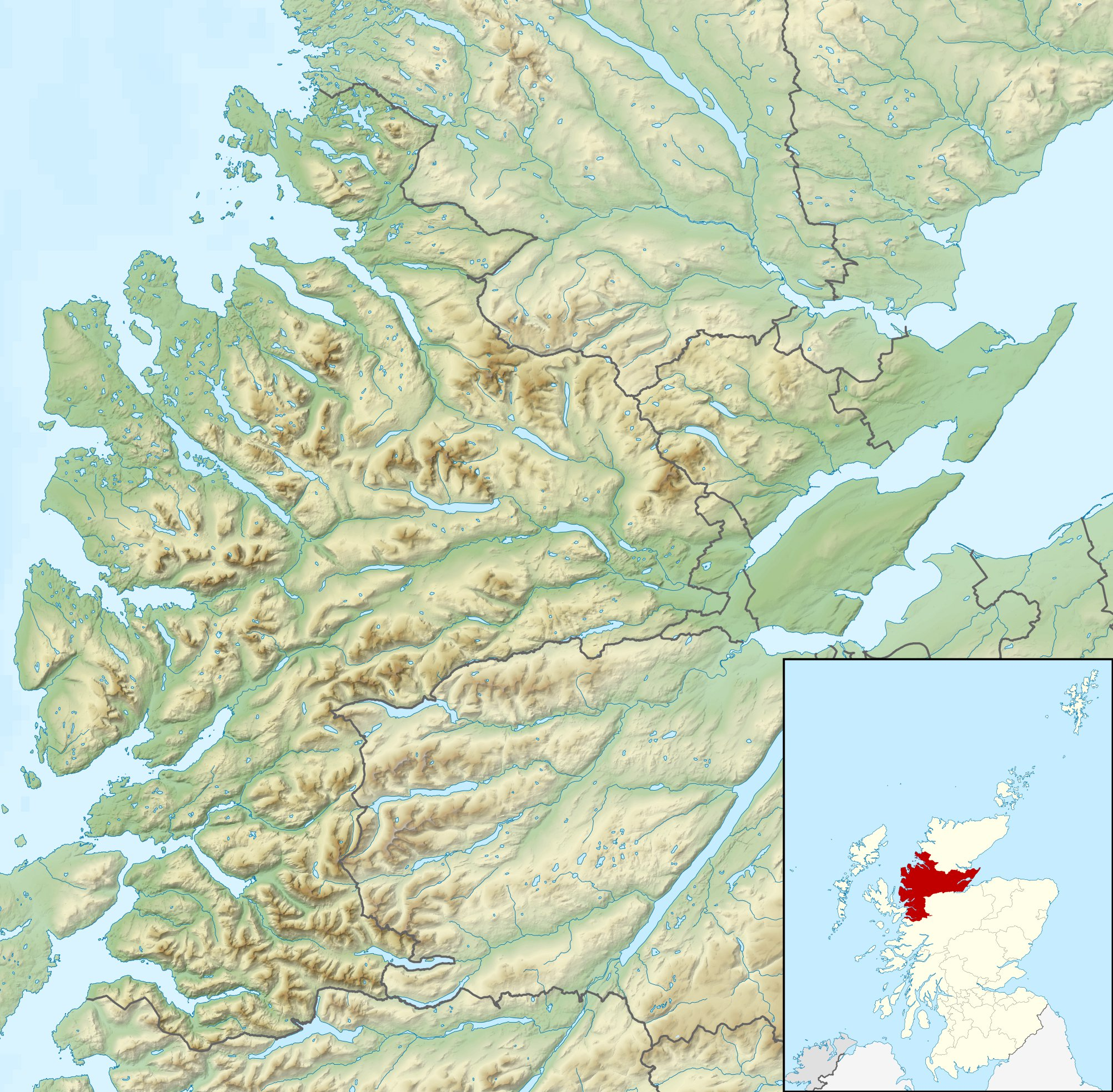
- Location within Ross and Cromarty

General information
- Type: RNLI Lifeboat Station
- Location: Kyle Prospect Road, Kyle of Lochalsh, Highland, IV40 8AJ, Scotland
- Coordinates: 57°16′48.3″N 5°42′53.7″W
- Opened: 23 April 1995
- Owner: Royal National Lifeboat Institution

Website
- Kyle of Lochalsh RNLI Lifeboat Station

Kyle of Lochalsh Lifeboat Station is located next to the Fisheries Pier, on Kyle Prospect Road, in Kyle of Lochalsh, a village at the end of the Lochalsh peninsula in north-west Scotland, formerly in Ross and Cromarty, now in the administrative region of Highland.

A lifeboat was first stationed at Kyle of Lochalsh by the Royal National Lifeboat Institution (RNLI) on 23 April 1995.

The station currently operates the B-class (Atlantic 85) Inshore lifeboat, Spirit of Fred. Olsen (B-856), on station since 2011.

== History ==
At a meeting of the RNLI Executive Committee held on 23 November 1994, it was resolved that an Inshore lifeboat station be established at Kyle of Lochalsh in 1995, with an B-class Atlantic 21 lifeboat placed on station, for an evaluation period of one-year.

The Royal Antediluvian Order of Buffaloes is the largest fraternal order in England. They are a charitable organisation, and have been supporting the RNLI since 1887. Their first lifeboat, R.A.O.B. (ON 130), was a 34-foot self-righting 'Pulling and Sailing' (P&S) lifeboat, one with oars and sails, and was the first lifeboat to be placed at Dungeness. In 1995, a B-class (Atlantic 21) Inshore lifeboat R.A.O.B. (B-535), which had already served at Hartlepool and Berwick-upon-Tweed since 1975, was the first lifeboat placed at the new Kyle of Lochalsh station. The R.A.O.B. (B-535) was replaced after two years, by the larger Atlantic 75-class, Alexander Cattanach (B-740).

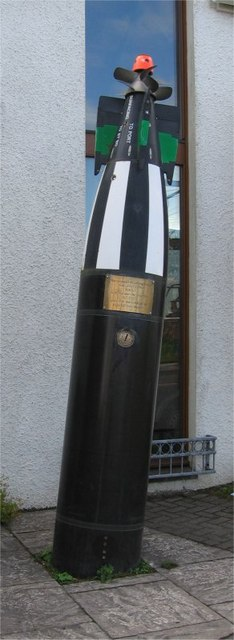
Torpedo Coin Collection Box

A station building was constructed, and completed in August 2000. It provides housing for the lifeboat and launch tractor, crew facilities, workshop and a retail outlet, and also accommodates the harbour master's office.

One of the more unusual items to be found at Kyle of Lochalsh lifeboat station, is a Tigerfish Torpedo, converted to be a donation collection box. The torpedo was donated by the British Underwater Test and Evaluation Centre, who are based in Kyle of Lochalsh, and were established in the 1970s to test and evaluate equipment for the Royal Navy and the Ministry of Defence. It is reported that the propellers on top were hastily fitted replacements, when it was realised that the torpedo was still fitted with the top secret version. A brass plate reads "This unusual collecting vessel was gifted to the R.N.L.I. (Royal National Lifeboat Institution) to symbolise the vital role B.U.T.E.C.(British Underwater Test and Evaluation Centre) played in the birth of the Kyle Lifeboat Station".

Fred. Olsen Cruise Lines are the longest-running corporate partner of the Royal National Lifeboat Institution (RNLI). The company has been supporting the RNLI since 1971, and in 2011, its generous passengers raised £95,424 for the RNLI. In 2011, Kyle of Lochalsh would receive a new Atlantic 85-class lifeboat, funded by guests onboard Fred. Olsen's four ships Balmoral, Black Watch, Braemar and Boudicca. At a ceremony in April 2012, the lifeboat was named Spirit of Fred. Olsen (B-856).

On Saturday 21 November 2020, Kyle of Lochalsh lifeboat was called to the aid of nine divers, when their dive boat lost power, and drifted away from the dive site. All divers were recovered, and the boat was later towed to harbour.

== Station honours ==
The following are awards made at Kyle of Lochalsh.

- Merchant Navy Medal for Meritorious Service

Capt. Iain MacKenzie, Lifeboat Operations Manager – 2025

== Kyle of Lochalsh lifeboats ==
Op.No. (Note: Op. No. is the RNLI's Operational Number of the boat or vehicle carried on the hull.)	Name	On station	Class	Comments
B-535	R.A.O.B.	1995–1997	B-class (Atlantic 21)	
B-740	Alexander Cattanach	1997–2011	B-class (Atlantic 75)	
B-856	Spirit of Fred. Olsen	2011–	B-class (Atlantic 85)	

=== Launch and recovery tractors ===
Op. No.	Reg. No.	Type	On station	Comments
TA80	CU07 HDZ	New Holland TL80	2015–	

== See also ==
- List of RNLI stations
- List of former RNLI stations
- Royal National Lifeboat Institution lifeboats
