= Lough Ree Lifeboat Station =

RNLI lifeboat station in County Westmeath, Ireland

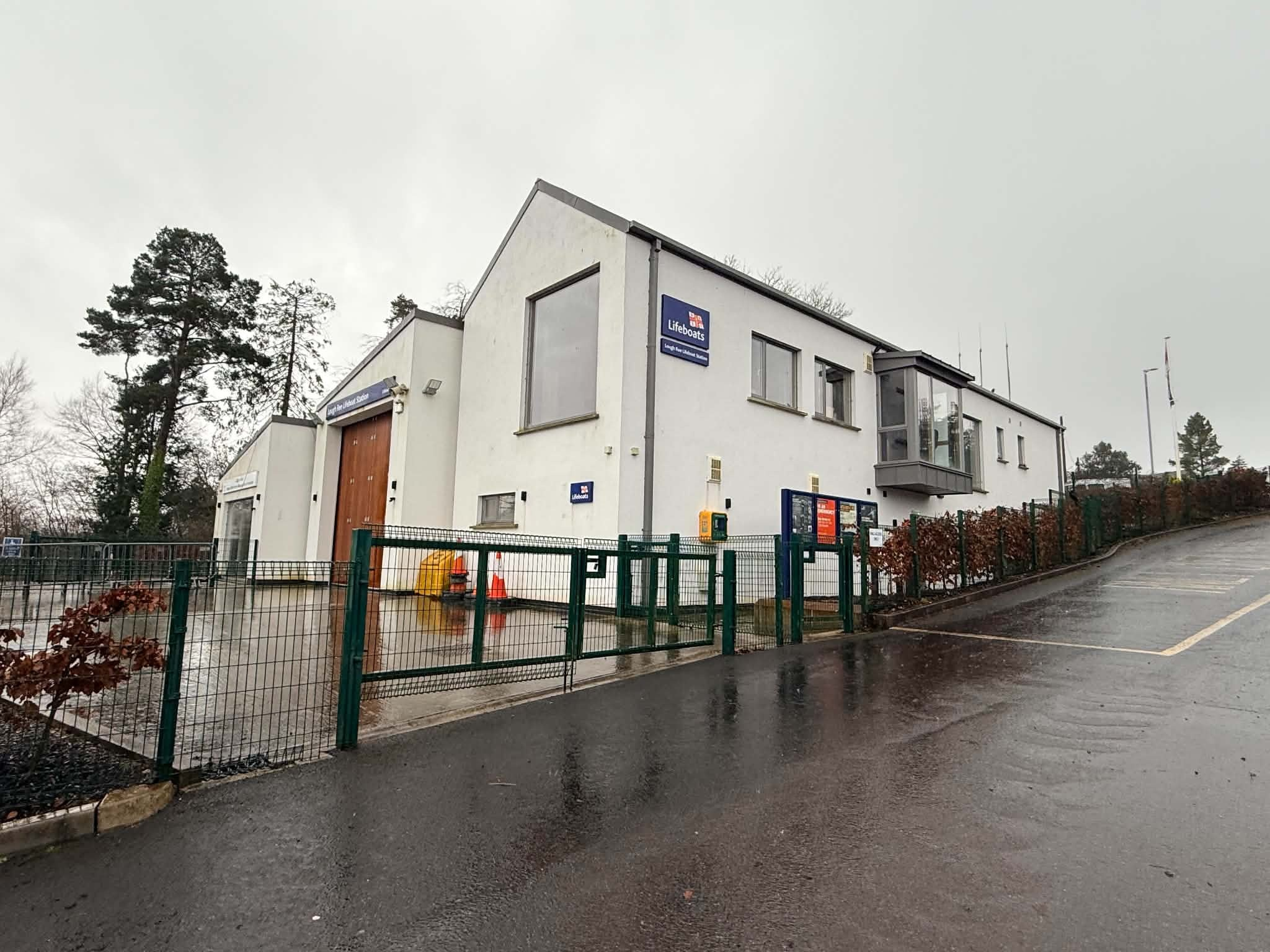
- Lough Ree Lifeboat Station

- Location within Ireland

General information
- Type: RNLI Lifeboat Station
- Location: Coosan Point, Coosan, County Westmeath, Ireland
- Coordinates: 53°27′51.1″N 7°55′40.1″W
- Opened: 29 June 2012
- Owner: Royal National Lifeboat Institution

Website
- Lough Ree RNLI Lifeboat Station

Lough Ree Lifeboat Station is situated at Coosan Point, on the eastern shore of Lough Ree, the second largest lake on the River Shannon, located in the centre of Ireland in County Westmeath.

A lifeboat station was established a Coosan Point on 29 June 2012 by the Royal National Lifeboat Institution (RNLI).

The station currently operates the B-class (Atlantic 85) Inshore lifeboat, Tara Scougall (B-920), on station since 2019.

== History ==
After representations to the RNLI in 2010 from the Inland Waterways Association of Ireland, supported by the Irish Coast Guard and various local groups, in 2011, it was decided to place a lifeboat at Lough Ree . The lough is approximately 29 kilometres (18 mi) long and 9.6 kilometres (6.0 mi) wide, covering 105 km^{2} (41 sq mi), and for many years had been seeing a steady increase in the amount of leisure activity.

A group of volunteers were selected to be both lifeboat crew and shore based. The relief B-class (Atlantic 75) lifeboat Dorothy Mary (B-728), funded by the legacies of Miss Dorothy Mary Rainie and Mr David Stanley Rainie, and previously on service at Red Bay, was delivered to the temporary base at Lough Ree Yacht Club on 1 March 2012. A period of intensive training then followed, on the water, and with visits to the RNLI Headquarters and training centre at Poole in Dorset.

A site was provided at Coosan Point by Westmeath County Council. The initial setup cost was estimated at £150,000, and some funds were raised towards the project with street collections and various fundraising events in Athlone, and the surrounding counties of Westmeath, Longford, and Roscommon. On 29 June 2012, the station was declared operational.

In 2014, Dorothy Mary (B-728) was withdrawn from service and retired. Lough Ree would receive another lifeboat from the relief fleet, Eric Rowse (B-772). The lifeboat had previously served at St Catherine in Jersey.

The Lough Ree crew would feature in Series 4, Episode 7, of the BBC Television series 'Saving Lives at Sea' in 2019, to rescue a man on one of the islands of Lough Ree, who had suffered a stroke.

The Atlantic 75-class The Eric Rouse was withdrawn from service in 2019. Lough Ree would finally get a new lifeboat allocated, and a new larger B-class (Atlantic 85) Inshore lifeboat, arrived on station.

A contract for the construction of a purpose built lifeboat station was awarded in September 2020, on a site donated by the Inland Waterways Association of Ireland, and located next to the existing temporary facilities. The station, constructed by Woodvale Construction of Omagh, is of a similar design to other new stations at Enniskillen and Carrybridge.

The station was handed over to the RNLI on the 29 March 2022. The cost of the project was £1.2 million. At a ceremony on 22 June 2022, the station was formally opened by Chief Executive of the RNLI Mark Dowie.

At the same ceremony, the new lifeboat, on station since 2019, was named Tara Scougall (B-920) by Eleanor and Edward Scougall, children of the late Tara Scougall, a traveller and explorer in her professional life, part of the team responsible for the creation of Expedia, and who also ran an online yachting and boating magazine. Mark Dowie formally accepted the lifeboat on behalf of the RNLI, from James Scougall, husband of the late Tara, and then handed the boat to the care of Lough Ree Lifeboat Station.

== Lough Ree lifeboats ==
Op.No. (Note: Op. No. is the RNLI's Operational Number of the boat carried on the hull.)	Name	On station	Class	Comments
B-728	Dorothy Mary	2012–2014	B-class (Atlantic 75)	
B-772	The Eric Rowse	2014–2019	B-class (Atlantic 75)	
B-920	Tara Scougall	2019–	B-class (Atlantic 85)	

=== Launch and recovery tractors ===
Op.No.	Reg.No.	Type	On station	Comments
TA52	02-D-86634	New Holland TN55D	2012–2021	
TA123	SP64 APX	New Holland TD5.95	2021–	

== See also ==
- List of RNLI stations
- List of former RNLI stations
- Royal National Lifeboat Institution lifeboats
