= Freshwater Bay Independent Lifeboat Station =

Lifeboat station on the Isle of Wight, UK

Freshwater Lifeboat Station

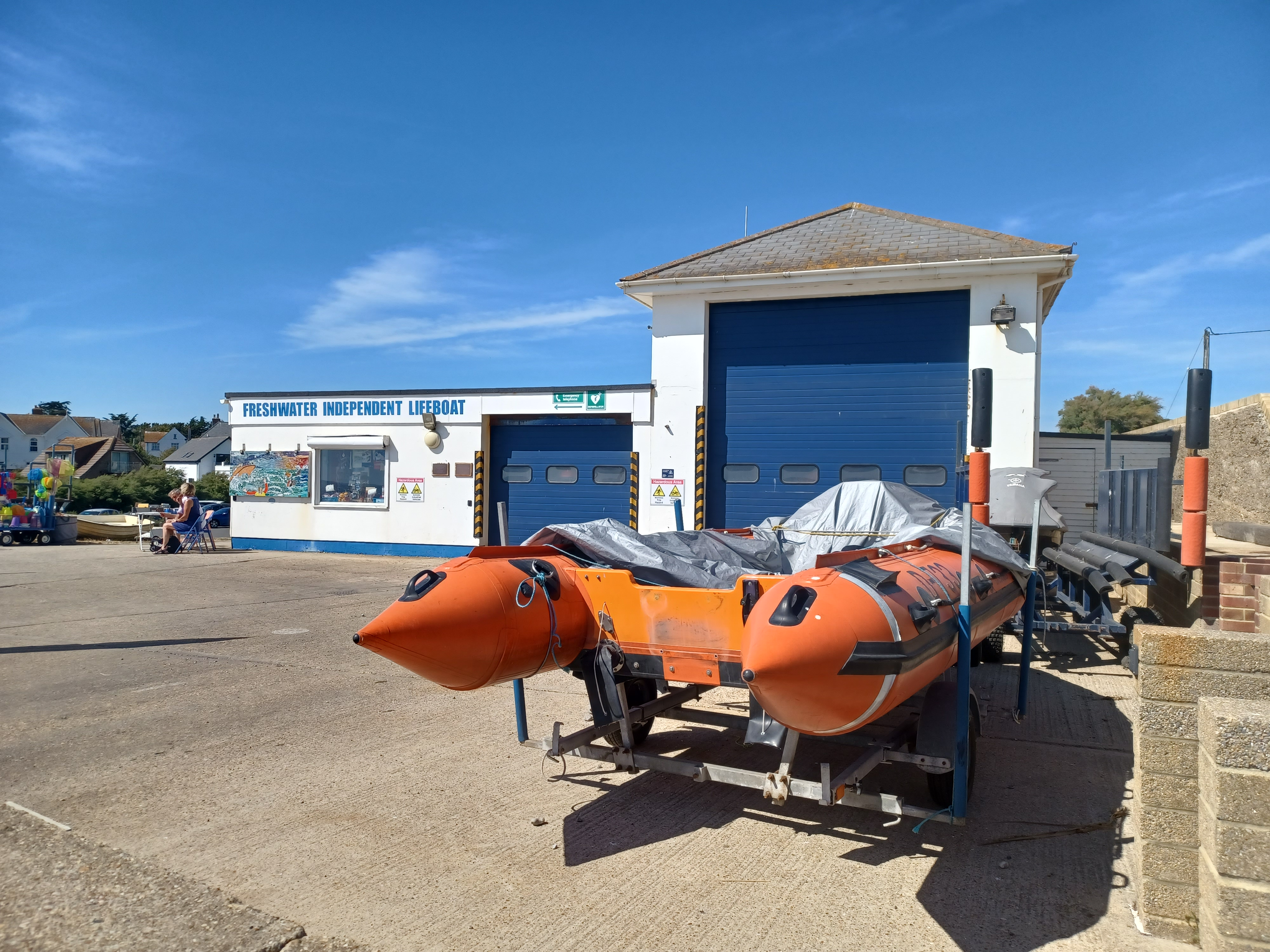
- Freshwater Lifeboat Station.

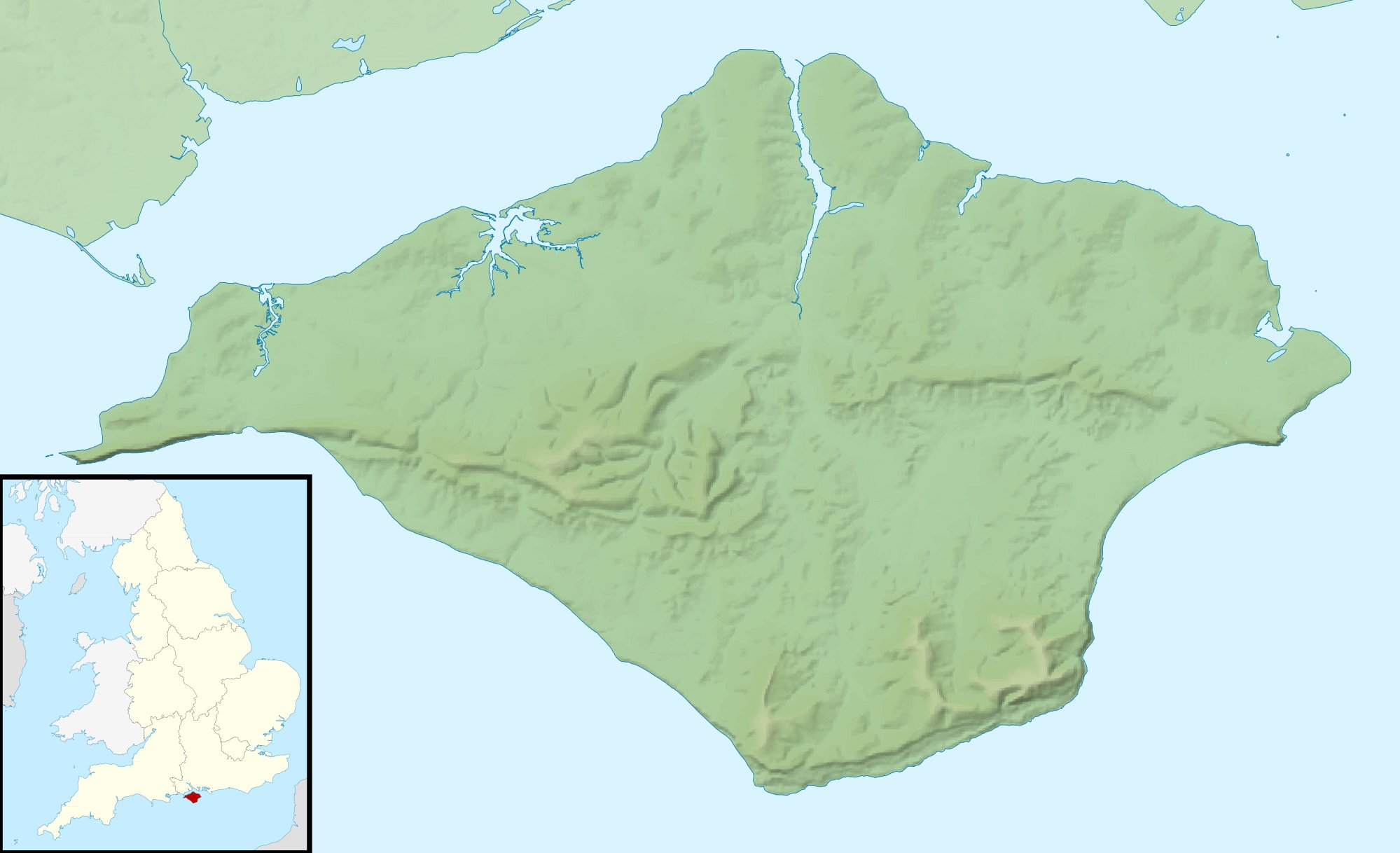
- Freshwater, Isle of Wight

General information
- Type: Lifeboat Station
- Location: The Boathouse, Freshwater Bay, Freshwater, Isle of Wight, PO40 9RA, England
- Coordinates: 50°40′13.0″N 1°30′36.7″W
- Opened: 1972
- Owner: The Freshwater Bay Independent Lifeboat Service, which is a registered charity

Website
- Freshwater Lifeboat

Freshwater Lifeboat Station is located on Gate Lane at Freshwater Bay, just south of the village of Freshwater, at the western end of the Isle of Wight, in the United Kingdom.

The station was established in 1972, and is owned and operated by the Freshwater Independent Lifeboat Service. Freshwater Lifeboat is on call to H.M. Coastguard 24 hours a day, 365 days a year. The station covers an area up to 30 miles (48 km) off shore from Hurst Point to St Catherine's point.

The station currently operates an Atlantic 85-class Inshore lifeboat, The Jillian Scott:Spirit of the West Wight V, on station since 2024, and a smaller D-class (IB1) Inshore lifeboat, The Warren J & B, on station since 2020.

Freshwater Lifeboat is a registered charity (No. 293657). The service is not part of the RNLI and does not receive funding from the RNLI or the government.

On 6 July 2024, a ceremony was held at Freshwater, at the launch of the new £180,000 Atlantic 85-class Inshore lifeboat. With a blessing from the Rev. Lisa Potter, and entertainment from both the Bay Wailers and The Brass Monkeys, Jason Fox of the television series SAS: Who Dares Wins attended with his wife, and named the lifeboat The Jillian Scott: Spirit of the West Wight V.

== Station honours ==
The following are awards made at Freshwater.

- Member, Order of the British Empire (MBE)

Stephen William Norris, Senior Coxswain – 2002NYH

=== Lifeboats ===
Name	On Station	Class	Engine	Comments
Spirit of the West Wight	????–2005	8.8 m (29 ft) Ribcraft RIB	Twin 115-hp Mercury	
Spirit of the West Wight II	2005–2013	Ribcraft RIB	Twin 225-hp Yamaha	
Spirit of the West Wight III	2013–2020	Ribcraft RIB	Inboard	
The Berry "B"	????–2022	D-class (IB1)	Single 50-hp Mercury	
Spirit of the West Wight IV	2020–2024	Atlantic 75	Twin 90-hp Yamaha	Formerly RNLB Victor "Danny" Lovelock (B-784) at Lymington
The Warren J & B	2022–	D-class (IB1)	Single 50-hp Mariner	Formerly RNLB Vision of Tamworth (D-733) at Barrow
The Jillian Scott: Spirit of the West Wight V	2024–	Atlantic 85	Twin 115-hp Yamaha	Formerly RNLB Lydia Macdonald (B-804) at Macduff

== See also ==
- Independent lifeboats in Britain and Ireland
