= Union Hall Lifeboat Station =

RNLI lifeboat station in County Cork, Ireland

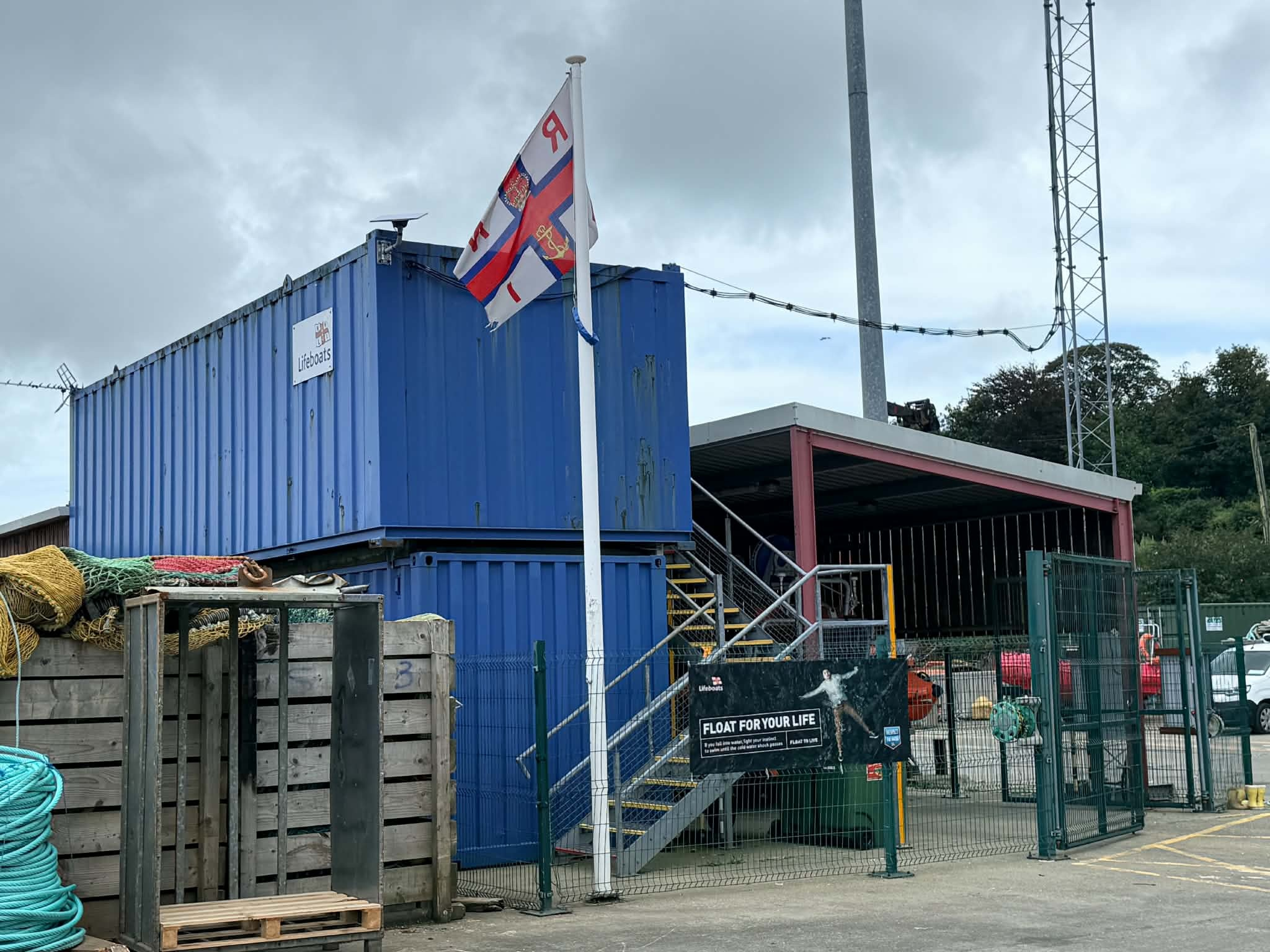
- Union Hall Lifeboat Station, Glandore Harbour, County Cork

- Location within Ireland

General information
- Type: RNLI Lifeboat Station
- Location: Keelbeg Pier, Union Hall, County Cork,, Ireland
- Coordinates: 51°33′31.8″N 9°08′00.6″W
- Opened: 1 September 2014
- Owner: Royal National Lifeboat Institution

Website
- Union Hall RNLI Lifeboat Station

Union Hall Lifeboat Station is located at Keelbeg Pier, near the small village of Union Hall, on the west side of Glandore Harbour, in County Cork, Ireland.

Union Hall lifeboat station was established in 2014 by the Royal National Lifeboat Institution (RNLI).

The station currently operates the B-class (Atlantic 85) Inshore lifeboat, Christine and Raymond Fielding (B-924), on station since 2021.

== History ==
In the Winter 2013 edition of the RNLI journal 'The Lifeboat', it was announced that a group of volunteers were preparing to open an Inshore lifeboat station at Keelbeg Pier, Union Hall in County Cork, from mid-2004, with a B-class lifeboat to be placed on station, on a 2-year evaluation period.

The Atlantic 75-class Maritime Nation (B-767) from the relief fleet, was placed at the station on 1 September 2014 for evaluation. The lifeboat had previously served for a short period on the River Thames at Chiswick.

In 2017, after three years of a two-year evaluation period, it was formally confirmed that Union Hall lifeboat station would become permanent. Temporary accommodation had been provided in the form of two stacked shipping containers, with the lifeboat kept under cover in an open 'barn', but work could now begin, with a view to creating a permanent station building.

2017 would also see the arrival of the second lifeboat from the relief fleet, Margaret Bench of Solihull (B-790), which had been named after her benefactor in 2003. The 15-year-old lifeboat had previously been on service at Abersoch until 2015.

On 24 June 2021, the first 'new' B-class (Atlantic 85) at Union Hall lifeboat station, was formally declared a search and rescue asset by the Irish Coast Guard. The lifeboat arrived on station the previous week, and replaced Margaret Bench of Solihull (B-790), which was being retired, the last operational Atlantic 75-class lifeboat in Ireland, and one of just a handful still in service. The Atlantic 85 usually carries a crew of four, rather than the three on the Atlantic 75, and with a stronger hull, and twin 115 horse-power engines, it also has a higher top speed of 35-knots.

At a naming ceremony and service of dedication on Saturday 25 June 2022, the new Atlantic 85-class was named Christine and Raymond Fielding (B-924). The lifeboat was funded from the bequest of the late Dr Raymond Fielding, a native of County Cork. He and his wife Christine were both keen sailors, spending many hours off the West Cork coast, and at his request, the lifeboat was to bear both their names. Since the station was opened in 2014, the Union Hall lifeboat had been launched 68 times, and brought 98 people to safety.

== Union Hall lifeboats ==
Op.No. (Note: Op. No. is the RNLI's Operational Number of the boat carried on the hull.)	Name	On station	Class	Comments
B-767	Maritime Nation	2014–2017	B-class (Atlantic 75)	
B-790	Margaret Bench of Solihull	2017–2021	B-class (Atlantic 75)	
B-924	Christine and Raymond Fielding	2021–	B-class (Atlantic 85)	

=== Launch and recovery tractors ===
Op.No.	Reg.No.	Type	On station	Comments
TA88	09-D-125295	New Holland T5040	2014–	

== See also ==
- List of RNLI stations
- List of former RNLI stations
- Royal National Lifeboat Institution lifeboats
