= Bundoran Lifeboat Station =

RNLI lifeboat station in County Donegal, Ireland

- Bundoran Lifeboat Station in 2025

- Location within Ireland
- Former names: Bundoran Inshore Rescue (Ind.)

General information
- Type: RNLI Lifeboat Station
- Location: The Pier, West End, Bundoran, County Donegal, F94 XN44, Ireland
- Coordinates: 54°28′37.4″N 8°17′20.8″W
- Opened: 1972, RNLI 1992
- Owner: Royal National Lifeboat Institution

Website
- Bundoran RNLI Lifeboat Station

Bundoran Lifeboat Station is located at West End in Bundoran, a seaside town and popular surfing destination, overlooking Donegal Bay, on the north west coast of Ireland, in County Donegal.

A lifeboat station was first established at Bundoran by Bundoran Inshore Rescue (BIR) in 1972. Management of the station was transferred to the Royal National Lifeboat Institution (RNLI) in 1992.

The station currently operates a B-class (Atlantic 85) William Henry Liddington (B-834), on station since 2009.

== History ==
Bundoran Independent Rescue was established in 1974, following the death of Signals NCO Danny Kerrigan of Finner Camp, who drowned at Rougey Cliffs. Despite his efforts to stay afloat, there was no boat available to be able to reach him in time.

The Bundoran rescue committee was formed to evaluate what could be done, and this resulted in the formation of Bundoran Independent Rescue. After consultation with the RNLI Water Safety team at Tramore in County Waterford, a second-hand D-class lifeboat was purchased from the RNLI, and a boathouse was constructed at West End Pier. The first five crew members were sent for training when the Irish Water Safety Association held a course at Tramore in conjunction with the RNLI.

A second rescue boat was purchased in 1979, this one being a larger Avon Searider RIB, and in 1983, a new boathouse was constructed.

In 1991, the RNLI was approached by the BIR committee, with a view to the management of the station being transferred to the Institution. This was agreed, and took effect in 1992, initially on a one-year evaluation period.

The B-class (Atlantic 21) U.S. Navy League (B-512), from the RNLI relief fleet, was placed on station on 28 March 1994, and a new boathouse was constructed at West Pier, to house the larger boat and Talus MB-4H amphibious tractor. Work was also carried out to remove rocks to provide a clear launching channel, to allow safer and easier launching of the lifeboat from its 'Drive-Off Drive-On' (Do-Do) launch carriage. On 30 May 1995, Bundoran would receive their permanently assigned lifeboat, the B-class (Atlantic 75) Helene (B-711).

In 2009, the boathouse underwent further alterations to accommodate a larger Atlantic 85, at a cost of £130,000.

After serving Bundoran for 14 years, the Atlantic 75-class Helene was retired to the training fleet the same year, and a new B-class (Atlantic 85) was assigned to Bundoran, arriving on 29 July. Following his death in 1989, Mr John Grover Liddington of Daventry left a legacy to the RNLI, sufficient to pay for two new B-class (Atlantic 85) Inshore lifeboats, and to be named after his late parents. The first was named Annette Mary Liddington (B-838), which was assigned to Beaumaris. The second was assigned to Bundoran, and named William Henry Liddington (B-834) at a ceremony in 2010.

== Bundoran lifeboats ==
=== Bundoran Inshore Rescue ===
Name	On station	Class	Comments
Unnamed	1974–1994	D-class	
Bridget Gorebooth	1979–1994	Avon Searider RIB	

=== RNLI ===
==== B class ====
Op. No. (Note: Op. No. is the RNLI's Operational Number of the boat carried on the hull or vehicle.)	Name	On station	Class	Comments
B-512	U.S. Navy League	1994–1995	B-class (Atlantic 21)	
B-711	Helene	1995–2009	B-class (Atlantic 75)	
B-834	William Henry Liddington	2009–	B-class (Atlantic 85)	

==== Launch and recovery tractors ====
Op.No.	Reg.No.	Type	On station	Comments
TW25Hc	L807 KNT	Talus MB-4H Hydrostatic (Mk2)	1994–2005	
TW24Hc	93-D-45502	Talus MB-4H Hydrostatic (Mk2)	2005–	

== See also ==
- List of RNLI stations
- List of former RNLI stations
- Royal National Lifeboat Institution lifeboats

== Sources ==
- Leonard, Richie; Denton, Tony (2026). Lifeboat Enthusiasts Handbook 2026. Lifeboats Enthusiasts' Society.
