= List of RNLI stations =

List of RNLI stations in Great Britain and Ireland

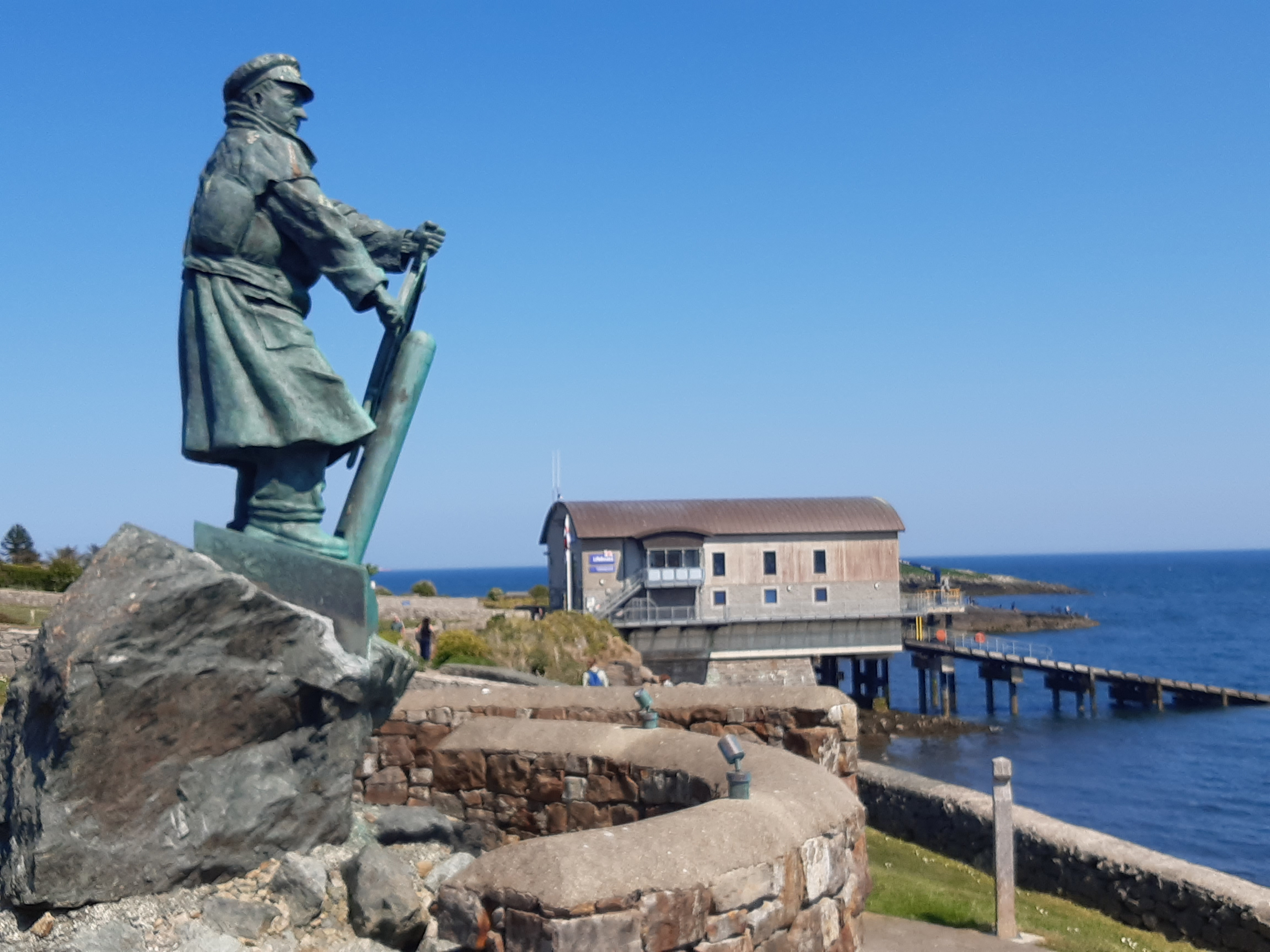
All-weather lifeboat station with a slipway for launching. (Moelfre)

Inshore lifeboat station, which uses a carriage to launch lifeboats. (Cleethorpes)

Royal National Lifeboat Institution (RNLI) stations are the bases for the RNLI's fleet of search and rescue lifeboats that cover the coastal waters around the entire British Isles, as well as major inland waterways.

The service was established in 1824 and is operated largely by volunteers. Its headquarters are at Poole, Dorset and it is a registered charity in both the United Kingdom and Republic of Ireland.

== Key ==
=== Lifeboat types ===
The types of boats provided at each station and the launching methods vary depending on local needs. If more than one boat is provided they are sometimes stationed in separate buildings at different locations in the same town. Current RNLI boats fall into three broad groups:

- All-weather lifeboats (ALBs): Severn, Shannon, Tamar, and Trent.
- Inshore lifeboats (ILBs): D-class (IB1), Atlantic 85 and E-class
- Hovercraft: H-class

=== Launch methods ===
Shannon Launch and Recovery System (SLARS) launching an All-weather lifeboat. (St Ives)

The principal launching methods are:

- Shannon Launch and Recovery System (SLARS) – tractor/track based mobile slipway
- Carriage – an ALB or ILB is pushed into the water on a carriage by a tractor
- Davit – an ALB or ILB is lowered into the water by a crane
- Launchway – an ILB is pushed into the water on a carriage by hand
- Moored afloat – an ALB or ILB is kept in the water alongside the lifeboat station or nearby, in which case a small boarding boat is provided so that the crew can reach it
- Slipway – an ALB slides down a slipway straight into the water
- Transporter – hovercraft are kept on the rear of trucks that can transport and offload them anywhere
- Versadock / Aquadock – a floating 'drive-on' pontoon

=== Regions ===
The following lists do not include the lifeguard patrolled beaches which also have their own equipment including inflatable boats and jetskis. The information is correct with reference to the Lifeboat Enthusiasts Handbook 2026 unless noted otherwise, and is set out like the RNLI's regional model. As far as possible it follows a clockwise route around the coast.

- North and East Region (North East and East England)
- South East Region (South and South East England)
- South West Region (South West England and the Channel Islands)
- Wales and West Region: (Wales, North West England and the Isle of Man)
- Scotland Region (Scotland)
- Ireland Region (Republic of Ireland and Northern Ireland)

== List of stations by region ==
=== North & East Region ===
Station	Location	Lifeboat type(s)	Launch method	Name and Op.No.	Photo
Berwick-upon-Tweed	Berwick-upon-Tweed, Northumberland	Atlantic 85; D-class (IB1)	Slipway; Davit	Penny J (B-940); Glenis Joan Felstead (D-900)	
Seahouses	Seahouses, Northumberland	Shannon; D-class (IB1)	SLARS; Carriage	13-36 John and Elizabeth Allen; Grace Darling (D-828)	
Craster	Craster, Northumberland	D-class (IB1)	Carriage	Skpr James Ballard RNVR DSC (D-839)	
Amble	Amble, Northumberland	Shannon; D-class (IB1)	Moored afloat; Davit	13-16 Elizabeth and Leonard; Alf and Dora Whiting (D-867)	
Newbiggin	Newbiggin, Northumberland	Atlantic 85	A85 Carriage	Richard Wake Burdon (B-864)	
Blyth	Blyth, Northumberland	Atlantic 85; D-class (IB1)	Aquadock; Davit	Patricia Southall (B-923); Sally Forth (D-878)	
Cullercoats	Cullercoats, Tyne and Wear	Atlantic 85	A85 Carriage	Daddy's Girl (B-935)	
Tynemouth	Tynemouth, Tyne and Wear	Severn; D-class (IB1)	Moored afloat; Davit	17-34 Osier; Little Susie (D-829)	
Sunderland	Sunderland, Tyne and Wear	Atlantic 85; D-class (IB1)	Davit; Davit	Seagil (B-945); Thee Andy Cantle (D-879)	
Hartlepool	Hartlepool, County Durham	Shannon; Atlantic 85	Moored afloat; Launchway	13-54 John Sharp; Solihull (B-881)	
Redcar	Redcar, North Yorkshire	Atlantic 85; D-class (IB1)	A85 Carriage; Carriage	Leicester Challenge III (B-858); Eileen May Loach-Thomas (D-786)	
Staithes and Runswick	Staithes, North Yorkshire	Atlantic 85	A85 Carriage	Sheila & Dennis Tongue III (B-897)	
Whitby	Whitby, North Yorkshire	Shannon; D-class (IB1)	Moored afloat; Davit	13-49 Lois Ivan; Warter Priory (D-810)	
Scarborough	Scarborough, North Yorkshire	Shannon; D-class (IB1)	SLARS; Carriage	13-15 Frederick William Plaxton; John Wesley Hillard IV (D-856)	
Filey	Filey, North Yorkshire	Atlantic 85; D-class (IB1)	A85 Carriage; Carriage	Marjorie Shepherd (B-928); The Rotarian (D-859)	
Flamborough	Flamborough, East Riding of Yorkshire	Atlantic 85	A85 Carriage	Forever Yibba (B-959)	
Bridlington	Bridlington, East Riding of Yorkshire	Shannon; D-class (IB1)	SLARS; Carriage	13-22 Antony Patrick Jones; Ernie Wellings (D-852)	
Withernsea	Withernsea, East Riding of Yorkshire	D-class (IB1)	Carriage	Mary Beal (D-837)	
Humber	Grimsby, North East Lincolnshire	Severn	Moored afloat	17-05 Pride of the Humber	
Cleethorpes	Cleethorpes, Lincolnshire	Atlantic 85; D-class (IB1)	A85 Carriage; Carriage	Loving You (B-942); James and Deanna Adams (D-889)	
Mablethorpe	Mablethorpe, Lincolnshire	Atlantic 85; D-class (IB1)	A85 Carriage; Carriage	Jacqueline Saville (B-887); Stanley Whiteley Chadwick (D-790)	
Skegness	Skegness, Lincolnshire	Shannon; D-class (IB1)	SLARS; Carriage	13-17 Joel and April Grunhill; The Holland Family (D-842)	
Hunstanton	Hunstanton, Norfolk	Hovercraft; Atlantic 85	Launchway; A85 Carriage	The Hunstanton Flyer (Civil Service No.45) (H-003); Spirit of West Norfolk (B-848)	
Wells-next-the-Sea	Wells-next-the-Sea, Norfolk	Shannon; D-class (IB1)	SLARS; Carriage	13-46 Duke of Edinburgh (Civil Service No.53); Peter Wilcox (D-797)	
Sheringham	Sheringham, Norfolk	Atlantic 85	A85 Carriage	The Oddfellows (B-818); Station temp. closed due to structural issues.	
Cromer	Cromer, Norfolk	Tamar; D-class (IB1)	Slipway; Carriage	16-07 Lester; Mr Eric Sharpe (D-868)	
Happisburgh	Happisburgh, Norfolk	D-class (IB1)	Carriage	Russell Pickering (D-813)	
Great Yarmouth and Gorleston	Gorleston, Norfolk	Shannon; Atlantic 85	Moored afloat; Davit	13-44 George and Frances Phelon; John Rowntree (B-925)	
Lowestoft	Lowestoft, Suffolk	Shannon	Moored afloat	13-05 Patsy Knight	
Southwold	Southwold, Suffolk	Atlantic 85	Davit	Annie Tranmer (B-868)	
Aldeburgh	Aldeburgh, Suffolk	Atlantic 85; D-class (IB1)	A85 Carriage; Carriage	Ralph (B-949); Susan Scott (D-808)	
Harwich	Harwich, Essex	Severn; Atlantic 85	Moored afloat; Davit	17-03 Albert Brown; Tierney Harvey and Sonny Reid (B-907)	
Walton and Frinton	Walton-on-the-Naze, Essex	D-class (IB1)	Carriage	John Wickens (D-798) (training)	
Clacton-on-Sea	Clacton-on-Sea, Essex	Shannon; D-class (IB1)	SLARS; Carriage	13-52 Chris and Jo West; Damar's Pride (D-849)	
West Mersea	West Mersea, Essex	Atlantic 85	Carriage	Just George (B-879)	
Burnham-on-Crouch	Burnham-on-Crouch, Essex	Atlantic 85; D-class (IB1)	Floating Boathouse; Floating Boathouse	Tony and Robert Pritt (B-849); David and Barbara Chapman (D-807)	

=== South East Region ===
Station	Location	Lifeboat type(s)	Launch method	Name and Op.No.	Photo
Southend-on-Sea	Southend-on-Sea, Essex	Atlantic 85; D-class (IB1); D-class (IB1); Hovercraft	Davit; Davit; Launchway; Launchway	Julia & Angus Wright (B-885); Sue Sorotos (D-904); Len Thorne GM MBE (D-818); Vera Ravine (H-004)	
Tower	Victoria Embankment, London	E-class Mk2; E-class Mk3	Moored afloat; Moored afloat	Hurley Burley (E-07); Hearn Medicine Chest (E-10)	
Teddington	Teddington, Middlesex	D-class (IB1); D-class (IB1)	Launchway; Carriage	Peter Saw (D-785); Alderman Penny Shelton (D-874)	
Wandsworth Riverside	Wandsworth, London	E-class Mk2; E-class Mk2	Moored afloat; Moored afloat	Dougie and Donna B (E-08); Brawn Challenge (E-09)	
Gravesend	Gravesend, Kent	Atlantic 85	Aquadock	Olive Laura Deare II (B-827)	
Sheerness	Sheerness, Kent	Shannon; D-class (IB1)	Moored afloat; Davit	13-38 Judith Copping Joyce; Buster (D-799)	
Whitstable	Whitstable, Kent	Atlantic 85	A85 Carriage	Lewisco (B-877)	
Margate	Margate, Kent	Atlantic 85; D-class (IB1)	A85 Carriage; Carriage	Colonel Stock (B-930); Alfred Alexander Staden (D-841)	
Ramsgate	Ramsgate, Kent	Tamar; Atlantic 85	Moored afloat; Davit	16-23 Diamond Jubilee; Claire and David Delves (B-878)	
Walmer	Walmer, Kent	Atlantic 85; D-class (IB1)	A85 Carriage; Launchway	Hounslow Branch (B-950); Duggie Rodbard II (D-794)	
Dover	Dover, Kent	Severn	Moored afloat	Relief Severn	
Littlestone-on-Sea	Littlestone-on-Sea, Kent	Atlantic 85	A85 Carriage	Jean McIvor (B-922)	
Dungeness	Dungeness, Kent	Shannon	SLARS	13-02 The Morrell	
Rye Harbour	Rye Harbour, East Sussex	Atlantic 85	A85 Carriage	Hello Herbie II (B-900)	
Hastings	Hastings, East Sussex	Shannon; D-class (IB1)	SLARS; Carriage	13-28 Richard and Caroline Colton; Richard Francis (D-835)	
Eastbourne	Eastbourne, East Sussex	Trent; D-class (IB1)	Moored afloat; Carriage	14-02 Esme Anderson; The David H (D-876)	
Newhaven	Newhaven, East Sussex	Severn; D-class (IB1)	Moored afloat; Aquadock	17-21 David & Elizabeth Acland; Elaine McLeod Scott (D-812)	
Brighton	Brighton, East Sussex	Atlantic 85	Floating Boathouse	Random Harvest (B-852)	
Shoreham Harbour	Shoreham-by-Sea, West Sussex	Tamar; D-class (IB1)	Slipway; Carriage	16-15 Enid Collett; Jandy (D-918)	
Littlehampton	Littlehampton, West Sussex	Atlantic 85; D-class (IB1)	Carriage; Carriage	Renée Sherman (B-891); Spirit of Fidelity (D-902)	
Selsey	Selsey, West Sussex	Shannon; D-class (IB1)	SLARS; Launchway	13-20 Denise and Eric; Flt Lt John Buckley RAF (D-827)	
Hayling Island	Hayling Island, Hampshire	Atlantic 85; D-class (IB1)	A85 Carriage; Carriage	Clark (B-964); The John Dodd (D-913)	
Portsmouth	Portsmouth, Hampshire	Atlantic 85; D-class (IB1)	Carriage; Launchway	Norma T (B-846); The Dennis Faro (D-850)	
Bembridge	Bembridge, Isle of Wight	Tamar; D-class (IB1)	Slipway; Launchway	16-17 Alfred Albert Williams; Sue (D-912)	
Cowes	Cowes, Isle of Wight	Atlantic 85	Slipway	Sheena Louise (B-859)	
Yarmouth	Yarmouth, Isle of Wight	Severn	Moored afloat	17-25 Eric & Susan Hiscock	
Calshot	Calshot, Hampshire	Atlantic 85; D-class (IB1)	Carriage; Carriage	Max Walls (B-860); David Radcliffe (D-880)	
Lymington	Lymington, Hampshire	Atlantic 85	Carriage	David Bradley (B-882)	
Mudeford	Mudeford, Dorset	Atlantic 85	Carriage	Henrietta H (B-948)	
Poole	Poole, Dorset	Atlantic 85; D-class (IB1)	Floating Boathouse; Floating Boathouse	Joan-Ray (B-961); Gladys Maud Burton (D-804)	
Swanage	Swanage, Dorset	Shannon; D-class (IB1)	Slipway; Launchway	13-13 George Thomas Lacy; Roy Norgrove (D-884)	

=== South West Region ===
Station	Location	Lifeboat type(s)	Launch method	Name and Op.No.	Photo
Weymouth	Weymouth, Dorset	Severn; Atlantic 85	Moored afloat; Launchway	17-32 Ernest & Mabel; Jack and Phyl Cleare (B-917)	
Lyme Regis	Lyme Regis, Dorset	Atlantic 85	A85 Carriage	Spirit of Loch Fyne (B-857)	
Alderney	Braye Harbour, Alderney	Trent	Moored afloat	14-29 Inner Wheel II	
St Helier	St. Helier, Jersey	Tamar; Atlantic 85	Moored afloat; Versadock	16-12 George Sullivan; The Spirit of St Helier (B-934)	
St Catherine	St. Martin, Jersey	Atlantic 85	A85 Carriage	Eric W Wilson (B-841)	
St Peter Port	St. Peter Port, Guernsey	Severn; Atlantic 85	Moored afloat; Tetradock	17-04 Spirit of Guernsey; Harold Hobbs (B-943)	
Exmouth	Exmouth, Devon	Shannon; D-class (IB1)	SLARS; Carriage	13-03 R. and J. Welburn; George Bearman II (D-805)	
Teignmouth	Teignmouth, Devon	Atlantic 85; Arancia-class	Carriage; Carriage	Claude and Kath (B-947); Malcolm Hawkesford I (A-67)	
Torbay	Brixham, Devon	Severn; D-class (IB1)	Moored afloat; Launchway	17-28 Alec & Christina Dykes; Leslie and Mary Daws (D-788)	
Dart	Dartmouth, Devon	Atlantic 85; D-class (IB1)	Aquadock; Carriage	Frank C. Samworth (B-931); Dudley Jane (D-838)	
Salcombe	Salcombe, Devon	Tamar; Atlantic 85	Moored afloat; Launchway	16-09 The Baltic Exchange III; Gladys Hilda Mustoe (B-905)	
Plymouth	Plymouth, Devon	Severn; Atlantic 85	Moored afloat; Aquadock	17-35 Sybil Mullen Glover; Annabel E Jones (B-908)	
Looe	Looe, Cornwall	Atlantic 85; D-class (IB1)	A85 Carriage; Carriage	Sheila & Dennis Tongue II (B-894); Ollie Naismith II (D-872)	
Fowey	Fowey, Cornwall	Atlantic 85; D-class (IB1)	Aquadock; Davit	Spirit of Daisy (B-956); Olive Three (D-817)	
Falmouth	Falmouth, Cornwall	Shannon; Atlantic 85	Moored afloat; Launchway	13-56 Decibel Too; Robina Nixon Chard (B-916)	
The Lizard	The Lizard, Cornwall	Tamar	Slipway	16-20 Rose	
Penlee	Newlyn, Cornwall	Severn; Atlantic 85	Moored afloat; Versadock	17-36 Ivan Ellen; Mollie and Ivor Dent (B-893)	
St Mary's	St. Mary's, Isles of Scilly	Severn	Moored afloat	17-11 The Whiteheads	
Sennen Cove	Sennen Cove, Cornwall	Tamar; D-class (IB1)	Slipway; Slipway	16-14 City of London III; Arangy (D-896)	
St Ives	St. Ives, Cornwall	Shannon; D-class (IB1)	SLARS; Carriage	13-11 Nora Stachura; Donald Dean (D-803)	
St Agnes	St. Agnes, Cornwall	D-class (IB1)	Carriage	XKalibur (D-787)	
Newquay	Newquay, Cornwall	Atlantic 85; D-class (IB1)	A85 Carriage; Carriage	Uncle Johnny (B-936); Richmond (D-907)	
Padstow	Padstow, Cornwall	Tamar	Slipway	16-04 Spirit of Padstow	
Rock	Rock, Cornwall	D-class (IB1)	Carriage	PJS (D-905)	
Port Isaac	Port Isaac, Cornwall	D-class (IB1)	Carriage	Pride of Port Isaac; (Goeth Porthusek) (D-843)	
Bude	Bude, Cornwall	D-class (IB1)	Carriage	Barbara Anne Bennett (D-826)	
Clovelly	Clovelly, Devon	Atlantic 85	A85 Carriage	Toby Rundle (B-872)	
Appledore	Appledore, Devon	Shannon; Atlantic 85	Moored afloat; A85 Carriage	13-32 Ruth and David Arthur; Glaneley (B-861)	
Ilfracombe	Ilfracombe, Devon	Atlantic 85; D-class (IB1)	A85 Carriage; Carriage	Patrick and Dianne O'Connor (B-957); Deborah Brown III (D-863)	
Minehead	Minehead, Somerset	Atlantic 85; D-class (IB1)	A85 Carriage; Carriage	Penny J II (B-939); Exmoor Belle (D-847)	
Burnham-on-Sea	Burnham-on-Sea, Somerset	Atlantic 85; D-class (IB1)	A85 Carriage; Carriage	Doris Day and Brian (B-914); Burnham Reach (D-801)	
Weston-super-Mare	Weston-super-Mare, North Somerset	Atlantic 85; D-class (IB1)	A85 Carriage; Carriage	Alexander (B-875); The Adrian Beaumont (D-832)	
Portishead	Portishead, North Somerset	Atlantic 85	A85 Carriage	My Lady Anne (B-884)	

=== Wales, West & Isle of Man Region ===
Station	Location	Lifeboat type(s)	Launch method	Name and Op.No.	Photo
Penarth	Penarth, Vale of Glamorgan	Atlantic 85; D-class (IB1)	A85 Carriage; Carriage	Maureen Lilian (B-839); Spirit of Penarth II (D-822)	
Barry Dock	Barry, Vale of Glamorgan	Shannon; D-class (IB1)	Moored afloat; Aquadock	13-51 Richard and Caroline Colton II; Frances Mary Corscaden (D-820)	
Porthcawl	Porthcawl, Bridgend County Borough	Atlantic 85; D-class (IB1)	A85 Carriage; Carriage	Rose of the Shires (B-832); Hugo Missen (D-861)	
Port Talbot	Port Talbot, Neath Port Talbot	D-class (IB1)	Carriage	Craig Morris (D-848)	
The Mumbles	Mumbles, West Glamorgan	Tamar-class; D-class (IB1)	Slipway; Carriage	16-27 Roy Barker IV; Hugh, Maureen and Heather Pope (D-895)	
Horton and Port Eynon	Horton and Port Eynon, Swansea	D-class (IB1)	Carriage	Barbara Jane (D-824)	
Burry Port	Burry Port, Carmarthenshire	Atlantic 85; D-class (IB1)	A85 Carriage; Carriage	The Missus Barrie (B-915); Williams and Cole (D-882)	
Tenby	Tenby, Pembrokeshire	Tamar; D-class (IB1)	Slipway; Carriage	16-02 Haydn Miller; Kathleen Ann (D-858)	
Angle	Angle, Pembrokeshire	Tamar	Slipway	16-11 Mark Mason	
Little and Broad Haven	Little and Broad Haven, Pembrokeshire	D-class (IB1)	Carriage	Swaine-Legane (D-899)	
St Davids	St Davids, Pembrokeshire	Tamar; D-class (IB1)	Slipway; Carriage	16-26 Norah Wortley; Marian and Alan Clayton (D-840)	
Fishguard	Fishguard, Pembrokeshire	Trent; D-class (IB1)	Moored afloat; Launchway	14-03 Blue Peter VII; Edward Arthur Richardson (D-789)	
Cardigan	Cardigan, Ceredigion	Atlantic 85; D-class (IB1)	A85 Carriage; Carriage	Albatross (B-871); John Darbyshire (D-845)	
New Quay	New Quay, Ceredigion	Shannon; D-class (IB1)	SLARS; Carriage	13-48 Roy Barker V; Will Morgan (D-886)	
Aberystwyth	Aberystwyth, Ceredigion	Atlantic 85; Arancia-class	A85 Carriage; Launchway	Florence and Ernest Bowles (B-937); Wren (A-78)	
Borth	Borth, Ceredigion	D-class (IB1)	Carriage	Annie Lizzie (D-893)	
Aberdovey	Aberdyfi, Gwynedd	Atlantic 85	A85 Carriage	Hugh Miles (B-896)	
Barmouth	Barmouth, Gwynedd	Shannon; D-class (IB1)	SLARS; Carriage	13-30 Ella Larsen; Craig Steadman (D-814)	
Criccieth	Criccieth, Gwynedd	Atlantic 85; Arancia-class	A85 Carriage; Launchway	Frank Townley (B-938); Margaret and Nantw (A-76)	
Pwllheli	Pwllheli, Gwynedd	Shannon; D-class (IB1)	SLARS; Carriage	13-39 Smith Brothers; Robert J. Wright (D-811)	
Abersoch	Abersoch, Gwynedd	Atlantic 85	A85 Carriage	Peter and Ann Setten (B-886)	
Porthdinllaen	Porthdinllaen, Gwynedd	Tamar	Slipway	16-24 John D. Spicer	
Trearddur Bay	Trearddur Bay, Anglesey	Atlantic 85; D-class (IB1)	A85 Carriage; Carriage	Hereford Endeavour (B-847); Clive and Imelda Rawlings II (D-885)	
Holyhead	Holyhead, Anglesey	Trent; D-class (IB1)	Moored afloat; Carriage	14-19 Ger Tigchelaar; Mary & Archie Hooper (D-791)	
Moelfre	Moelfre, Anglesey	Tamar; D-class (IB1)	Slipway; Carriage	16-25 Kiwi; Enfys 2 (D-825)	
Beaumaris	Beaumaris, Anglesey	Atlantic 85	A85 Carriage	Annette Mary Liddington (B-838)	
Conwy	Conwy, Conwy County Borough	D-class (IB1)	Carriage	Enid and John Hislop (D-898)	
Llandudno	Llandudno, Conwy County Borough	Shannon; D-class (IB1)	SLARS; Carriage	13-18 William F. Yates; Dr Barbara Saunderson (D-793)	
Rhyl	Rhyl, Denbighshire	Shannon; D-class (IB1)	SLARS; Carriage	13-34 Anthony Kenneth Heard; Geoff Pearce (D-903)	
Flint	Flint, Flintshire	D-class (IB1)	Carriage	The Lady Barbara (D-795)	
Ramsey	Ramsey, Isle of Man	Shannon	SLARS	13-42 Anne and James Ritchie II	
Douglas	Douglas, Isle of Man	–	–	Station closed (temp)	
Port St Mary	Port St Mary, Isle of Man	Trent; D-class (IB1)	Moored afloat; Carriage	14-15 Henry Heys Duckworth; Frank Martin (D-873)	
Port Erin	Port Erin, Isle of Man	Atlantic 85	Slipway	Neil Crowe (B-951)	
Peel	Peel, Isle of Man	Shannon	SLARS	13-35 Frank and Brenda Winter	
West Kirby	West Kirby, Wirral	D-class (IB1)	Carriage	Leonard Pownall (D-883)	
Hoylake	Hoylake, Wirral	Shannon; Hovercraft	SLARS; Transporter	13-06 Edmund Hawthorn Micklewood; Hurley Spirit (H-005)	
New Brighton	New Brighton, Wirral	Atlantic 85	A85 Carriage	Charles Dibdin; (Civil Service No.51) (B-837)	
Lytham St Annes	Lytham St Annes, Lancashire	Shannon; D-class (IB1)	SLARS; Carriage	13-24 Barbara Anne; Moam (D-800)	
Blackpool	Blackpool, Lancashire	Atlantic 85; D-class (IB1); D-class (IB1)	A85 Carriage; Carriage; Carriage	William and Eleanor (B-867); Phyllis Rowan (D-862); Blackpool Endeavour (D-864)	
Fleetwood	Fleetwood, Lancashire	Shannon; D-class (IB1)	Moored afloat; Davit	13-14 Kenneth James Pierpoint; Harbet (D-853)	
Morecambe	Morecambe, Lancashire	Hovercraft; D-class (IB1)	Transporter; Carriage	The Hurley Flyer (H-002); Brenda Raworth (D-855)	
Barrow	Barrow-in-Furness, Cumbria	Tamar; D-class (IB1)	Slipway; Davit	16-08 Grace Dixon; Raymond and Dorothy Billingham (D-866)	
St Bees	St Bees, Cumbria	Atlantic 85	A85 Carriage	Joy Morris MBE (B-831)	
Workington	Workington, Cumbria	Shannon; D-class (IB1)	Davit; Davit	13-19 Dorothy May White; James R Allen (D-901)	
Silloth	Silloth, Cumbria	Atlantic 85	A85 Carriage	Elaine and Don Wilkinson (B-828)	

=== Scotland Region ===
Station	Location	Lifeboat type(s)	Launch method	Name and Op.No.	Photo
Kippford	Kippford, Dumfries and Galloway	D-class (IB1)	Carriage	Ronnie Sinclair (D-854)	
Kirkcudbright	Kirkcudbright, Dumfries and Galloway	Atlantic 85	A85 Carriage	George D Dow (B-952)	
Portpatrick	Portpatrick, Dumfries and Galloway	Shannon	Moored afloat	13-25 Stella and Humfrey Berkeley	
Stranraer	Stranraer, Dumfries and Galloway	D-class (IB1)	Carriage	Sheila MacDonald (D-833)	
Girvan	Girvan, Ayrshire	Shannon	Moored afloat	13-23 Elizabeth and Gertrude Allan	
Troon	Troon, Ayrshire	Shannon; D-class (IB1)	Moored afloat; Carriage	13-55 Roy Barker VI; Sheena (D-821)	
Largs	Largs, Ayrshire	Atlantic 85	A85 Carriage	R. A. Wilson (B-854)	
Helensburgh	Helensburgh, Argyll and Bute	Atlantic 85	Launchway	Angus and Muriel Mackay (B-903)	
Tighnabruaich	Tighnabruaich, Argyll and Bute	Atlantic 85	A85 Carriage	James and Helen Mason (B-862)	
Campbeltown	Campbeltown, Argyll and Bute	Severn; D-class (IB1)	Moored afloat; Carriage	17-19 Ernest and Mary Shaw; Leonard Mills (D-870)	
Arran	Lamlash, Isle of Arran, North Ayrshire	Atlantic 85	A85 Carriage	Rachael Hedderwick (B-876)	
Oban	Oban, Argyll and Bute	Shannon	Moored afloat	13-50 The Campbell-Watson	
Tobermory	Tobermory, Isle of Mull, Argyll and Bute	Severn	Moored afloat	17-39 Elizabeth Fairlie Ramsay	
Islay	Islay, Argyll and Bute	Severn	Moored afloat	17-08 Helmut Schroder of Dunlossit II	
Mallaig	Mallaig, Highland	Severn	Moored afloat	17-26 Henry Alston Hewat	
Barra Island	Barra, Outer Hebrides	Severn	Moored afloat	17-12 Edna Windsor	
Kyle of Lochalsh	Kyle of Lochalsh, Highland	Atlantic 85	Carriage	The Spirit of Fred Olsen (B-856)	
Portree	Portree, Highland	Shannon	Moored afloat	13-59 Peter and Mary	
Lochinver	Lochinver, Highland	Severn	Moored afloat	17-40 Julian and Margaret Leonard	
Stornoway	Stornoway, Outer Hebrides	Severn	Moored afloat	17-18 Tom Sanderson	
Thurso	Thurso, Highland	Severn	Moored afloat	17-42 The Taylors	
Longhope	Longhope, Orkney	Tamar	Moored afloat	16-05 Helen Comrie	
Kirkwall	Kirkwall, Orkney	Severn	Moored afloat	17-13 Margaret Foster	
Stromness	Stromness, Orkney	Severn	Moored afloat	17-16 Violet, Dorothy and Kathleen	
Lerwick	Lerwick, Shetland	Severn	Moored afloat	17-10 Michael and Jane Vernon	
Aith	Aith, Shetland	Severn	Moored afloat	17-14 Charles Lidbury	
Wick	Wick, Highland	Trent	Moored afloat	14-20 Roy Barker II	
Invergordon	Invergordon, Highland	Shannon	Moored afloat	13-37 Agnes A. P. Barr	
Kessock	North Kessock, Highland	Atlantic 85	A85 Carriage	Robert and Isobel Mowat (B-873)	
Loch Ness	Loch Ness, Highland	Atlantic 85	Floating cradle	Sheila & Dennis Tongue IV (B-902)	
Buckie	Buckie, Moray	Severn	Moored afloat	17-37 William Blannin	
Macduff	Macduff, Aberdeenshire	Atlantic 85	Lorry-mounted davit	Skipasund (B-933)	
Fraserburgh	Fraserburgh, Aberdeenshire	Tamar	Moored afloat	16-21 John Buchanan Barr	
Peterhead	Peterhead, Aberdeenshire	Tamar	Moored afloat	16-03 The Misses Robertson of Kintail	
Aberdeen	Aberdeen, Aberdeenshire	Severn; D-class (IB1)	Moored afloat; Davit	17-24 Bon Accord; Buoy Woodie - 85N (D-830)	
Stonehaven	Stonehaven, Aberdeenshire	Atlantic 85	Carriage	Jamie Hunter (B-919)	
Montrose	Montrose, Angus	Shannon; D-class (IB1)	Moored afloat; Davit	13-10 Ian Grant Smith; Ken Brown (D-897)	
Arbroath	Arbroath, Angus	Atlantic 85; D-class (IB1)	Carriage; Launchway	June Marshall (B-954); Mintybell (D-892)	
Broughty Ferry	Broughty Ferry, Dundee	Trent; D-class (IB1)	Moored afloat; Slipway	14-31 Elizabeth of Glamis; Oor Lifesaver (D-834)	
Anstruther	Anstruther, Fife	Shannon; D-class (IB1)	SLARS; Carriage	13-47 Robert and Catherine Steen; Akira (D-802)	
Kinghorn	Kinghorn, Fife	Atlantic 85	A85 Carriage	Tommy Niven (B-836)	
Queensferry	South Queensferry, Edinburgh	Atlantic 85	Carriage	Jimmy Cairncross (B-851)	
North Berwick	North Berwick, East Lothian	D-class (IB1)	Carriage	Sunijo (D-891)	
Dunbar	Dunbar, East Lothian	Trent; D-class (IB1)	Moored afloat; Davit	14-35 John Neville Taylor; David Lauder (D-844)	
Eyemouth	Eyemouth, Scottish Borders	Shannon; D-class (IB1)	Moored afloat; Versadock	13-29 Helen Hastings; Sheila (D-877)	

=== Ireland Region ===
Station	Location	Lifeboat type(s)	Launch method	Name and Op.No.	Photo
Portrush	Portrush, County Antrim	Severn; D-class (IB1)	Moored afloat; Slipway	17-30 William Gordon Burr; The Ken Blair (D-871)	
Red Bay	Red Bay, County Antrim	Trent; Atlantic 85	Moored afloat; A85 Carriage	14-32 Corinne Whiteley; Geoffrey Charles (B-843)	
Larne	Larne, County Antrim	Shannon; D-class (IB1)	Moored afloat; Carriage	13-58 Machiko Nancy; Terry (D-783)	
Bangor	Bangor, County Down	Atlantic 85	Carriage	Ruby Robinson (B-944)	
Donaghadee	Donaghadee, County Down	Trent	Moored afloat	14-21 MacQuarie	
Portaferry	Portaferry, County Down	Atlantic 85	Carriage	Blue Peter V (B-833)	
Newcastle	Newcastle, County Down	Atlantic 85; D-class (IB1)	Carriage; Carriage	Berylium (B-955); Cameronian (D-908)	
Kilkeel	Kilkeel, County Down	Shannon	Moored afloat	13-57 Bobby Cameron	
Clogherhead	Clogherhead, County Louth	Shannon	SLARS	13-31Michael O'Brien	
Skerries	Skerries, County Dublin	Atlantic 85	A85 Carriage	Louis Simson (B-866)	
Howth	Howth, County Dublin	Trent; D-class (IB1)	Moored afloat; Launchway	14-33 Roy Barker III; Aideen Cresswell (D-796)	
Dún Laoghaire	Dún Laoghaire; County Dublin	Trent; D-class (IB1)	Moored afloat; Launchway	14-05 Anna Livia; Joval (D-865)	
Wicklow	Wicklow, County Wicklow	Shannon; D-class (IB1)	Moored afloat; Carriage	13-27 Joanna and Henry Williams; Dennis-Audrey (D-806)	
Arklow	Arklow, County Wicklow	Shannon	Moored afloat	13-53 Roy Holloway	
Courtown	Courtown, County Wexford	D-class (IB1)	Carriage	Frank (D-846)	
Wexford	Wexford, County Wexford	D-class (IB1)	Carriage	Cill Dara (D-916)	
Rosslare Harbour	Rosslare Harbour, County Wexford	Severn	Moored afloat	17-43 Donald and Barbara Broadhead	
Kilmore Quay	Kilmore Quay, County Wexford	Tamar	Moored afloat	16-18 Killarney	
Fethard	Fethard-on-Sea, County Wexford	D-class (IB1)	Carriage	Naomh Dubhan (D-819)	
Dunmore East	Dunmore East, County Waterford	Shannon	Moored afloat	13-41 William and Agnes Wray	
Tramore	Tramore, County Waterford	D-class (IB1)	Carriage	Emma Vosper (D-915)	
Helvick Head	Helvick Head, County Waterford	Atlantic 85	Launchway	Robert Armstrong (B-874)	
Youghal	Youghal, County Cork	Atlantic 85	A85 Carriage	Gordon and Phil (B-890)	
Ballycotton	Ballycotton, County Cork	Trent	Moored afloat	14-25 Austin Lidbury	
Crosshaven	Crosshaven, County Cork	Atlantic 85	Davit	John and Janet (B-892)	
Kinsale	Kinsale, County Cork	Atlantic 85	Carriage	Miss Sally Anne (Baggy) II; Never Fear Baggy's Here (B-909)	
Courtmacsherry Harbour	Courtmacsherry, County Cork	Shannon	Moored afloat	13-45 Val Adnams	
Union Hall	Union Hall, County Cork	Atlantic 85	Carriage	Christine and Raymond Fielding (B-924)	
Baltimore	Baltimore, County Cork	Tamar; Atlantic 85	Moored afloat; A85 Carriage	16-22 Alan Massey; Rita Daphne Smyth (B-910)	Baltimore Lifeboat Station
Castletownbere	Castletownbere, County Cork	Severn	Moored afloat	17-44 Annette Hutton	Castletownbere Lifeboat Station
Valentia	Valentia Island, County Kerry	Severn	Moored afloat	17-07John and Margaret Doig	
Fenit	Fenit, County Kerry	Shannon; D-class (IB1)	Moored afloat; Floating Boathouse	13-60 Roy Barker VII; Lizzie (D-860)	
Kilrush	Kilrush, County Clare	Atlantic 85	A85 Carriage	Edith Louise Eastwick (B-844)	
Lough Derg	Dromineer, Lough Derg; County Tipperary	Atlantic 85	Versadock	Jean Spier (B-911)	
Aran Islands	Aran Islands, County Galway	Severn	Moored afloat	17-06 David Kirkaldy	
Lough Ree	Coosan Point, County Westmeath	Atlantic 85	Carriage	Tara Scougall (B-920)	
Galway	Galway, County Galway	Atlantic 85	Davit	Binny (B-853)	
Clifden	Clifden, County Galway	Shannon; Atlantic 85	Moored afloat; A85 Carriage	13-43 St Christopher; Joyce King (B-869)	
Achill Island	Cloghmore, County Mayo	Trent	Moored afloat	14-28 Sam and Ada Moody	
Ballyglass	Ballyglass, County Mayo	Severn; D-class (IB1)	Moored afloat; Carriage	17-15 Bryan and Gordon; Clann Lir (D-823)	
Sligo Bay	Rosses Point, County Sligo	Atlantic 85	Carriage	Sheila & Dennis Tongue (B-888)	
Carrybridge	Carrybridge, County Fermanagh	Atlantic 85	Carriage	Douglas, Euan and Kay Richards (B-904)	
Enniskillen	Enniskillen, County Fermanagh	Atlantic 85	Carriage	John and Jean Lewis (B-912)	
Bundoran	Bundoran, County Donegal	Atlantic 85	A85 Carriage	William Henry Liddington (B-834)	
Arranmore	Arranmore, County Donegal	Severn	Moored afloat	17-22 Myrtle Maud	
Lough Swilly	Buncrana, County Donegal	Shannon; Atlantic 85	Moored afloat; A85 Carriage	13-08 Derek Bullivant; Davdot (B-958)	

== See also ==
- List of former RNLI stations
- Royal National Lifeboat Institution lifeboats
- Independent lifeboats in Britain and Ireland
