= Atlantic 85-class lifeboat =

Fleet of rigid inflatable boats used by the RNLI

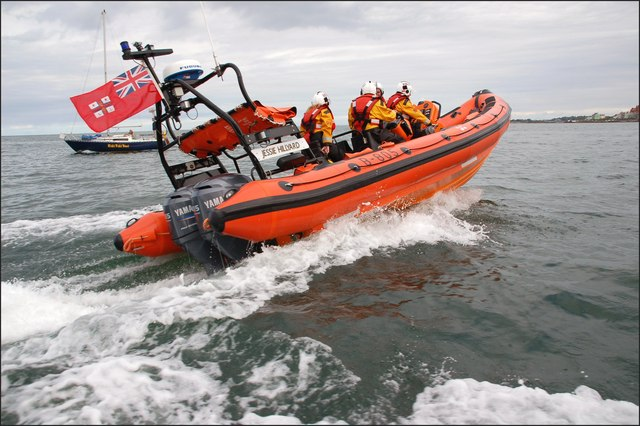
- Atlantic 85 B-805 on exercise in Bangor

Class overview
- Name: Atlantic 85
- Builders: Inshore Lifeboat Centre, Cowes
- Operators: Royal National Lifeboat Institution
- Preceded by: Atlantic 75
- Cost: £320,000
- In service: 2005–
- In commission: 2006–
- Completed: 144

General characteristics
- Class & type: B-class Atlantic 85
- Displacement: 1.8 tonnes
- Length: 8.44 m (27.7 ft)
- Beam: 2.85 m (9.4 ft)
- Draught: 0.53 m (1.7 ft)
- Propulsion: 2 × Yamaha 4-stroke outboard engines, 115 hp (86 kW); 210 litres fuel
- Speed: 35 knots (40 mph; 65 km/h)
- Endurance: 2.5 hours
- Capacity: 24
- Complement: 4

The Atlantic 85 is a third-generation B-class rigid inflatable boat (RIB) inshore lifeboat. It is operated around the shores of the British Isles and the Channel Islands by the Royal National Lifeboat Institution (RNLI). It was developed from the Atlantic 21 and the later Atlantic 75. It entered service in 2005, and gradually replaced the Atlantic 75.

The Atlantic design of the B-class of lifeboats is named after Atlantic College, where the design was developed.

== Design ==
The hull is made of a fibre-reinforced composite, consisting of a carbon fibre and foam core laminate with an epoxy glass and foam sandwich layup. The tubes are Hypalon.

The boat is powered by twin 115 hp (86 kW) Yamaha 4-stroke outboard engines that have been inversion-proofed to ensure the engines are still operational after a capsize.

Like previous RIBs, it has a manually operated self-righting mechanism that deploys an airbag mounted atop the A-frame. It can be beached in an emergency without damage to engines or steering gear. The Atlantic 85 is fitted with radar and VHF direction finding equipment and can be operated safely in daylight in a force 6/7 wind and at night in a force 5/6.

The Atlantic 85 has intercom communications between the crew and VHF radio via their helmets. The lifeboat is also equipped with the RNLI's SIMS (ship information & management system) which provides the crew with combined chartplotter and AIS, radar and VHF directional finding capability. It carries searchlights, handheld night-vision equipment and illuminating paraflares for night-time operations, as well as casualty care equipment.

To ensure equipment is kept to a high standard of repair, boats go through annual or bi-annual overhauls, and 4-year refits.

All of the following fleet details are referenced to the 2026 Lifeboat Enthusiast Society Handbook, with information retrieved directly from RNLI records.

== Gallery ==
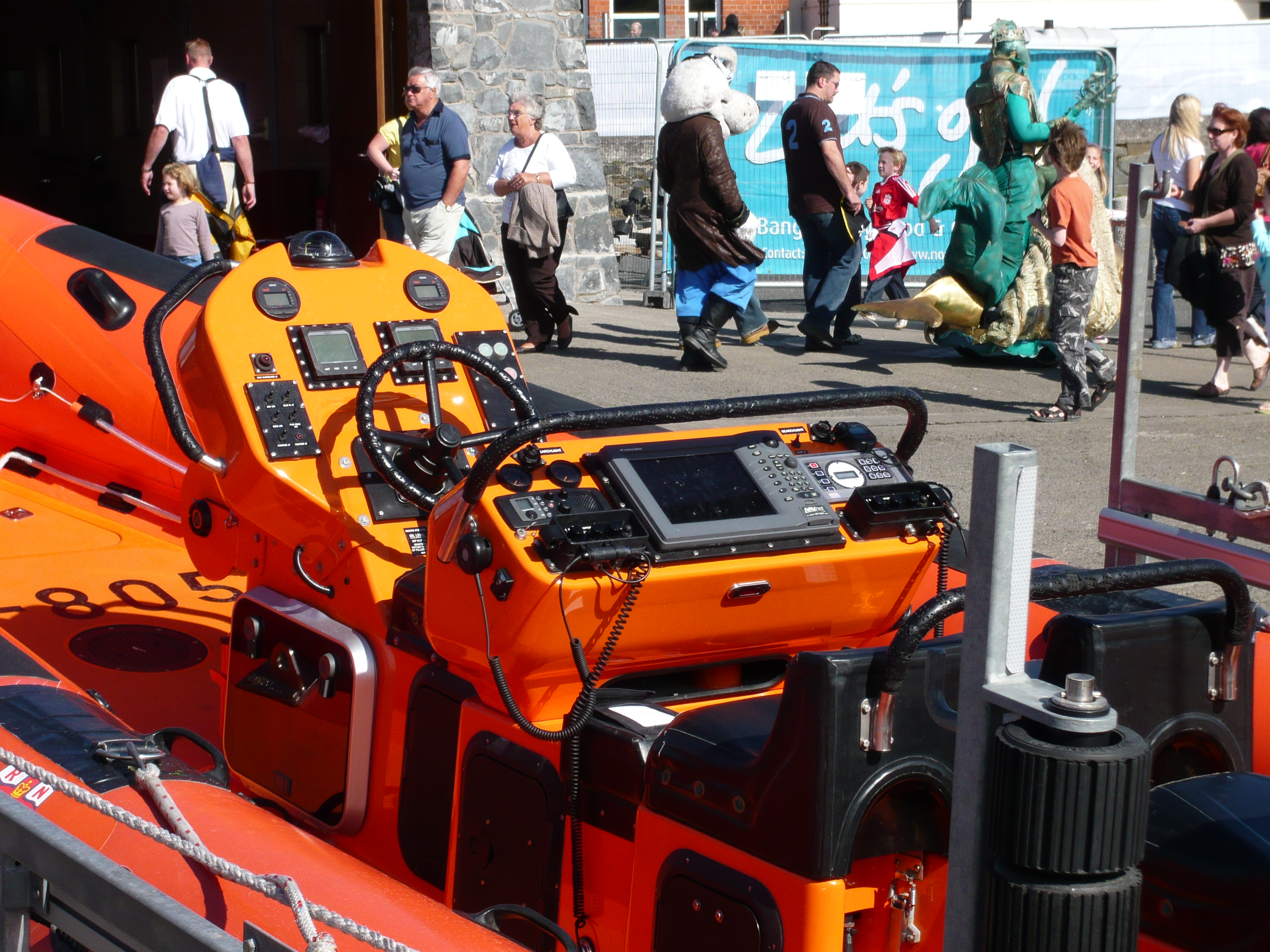
A close up of the console & controls of Atlantic 85 B-805

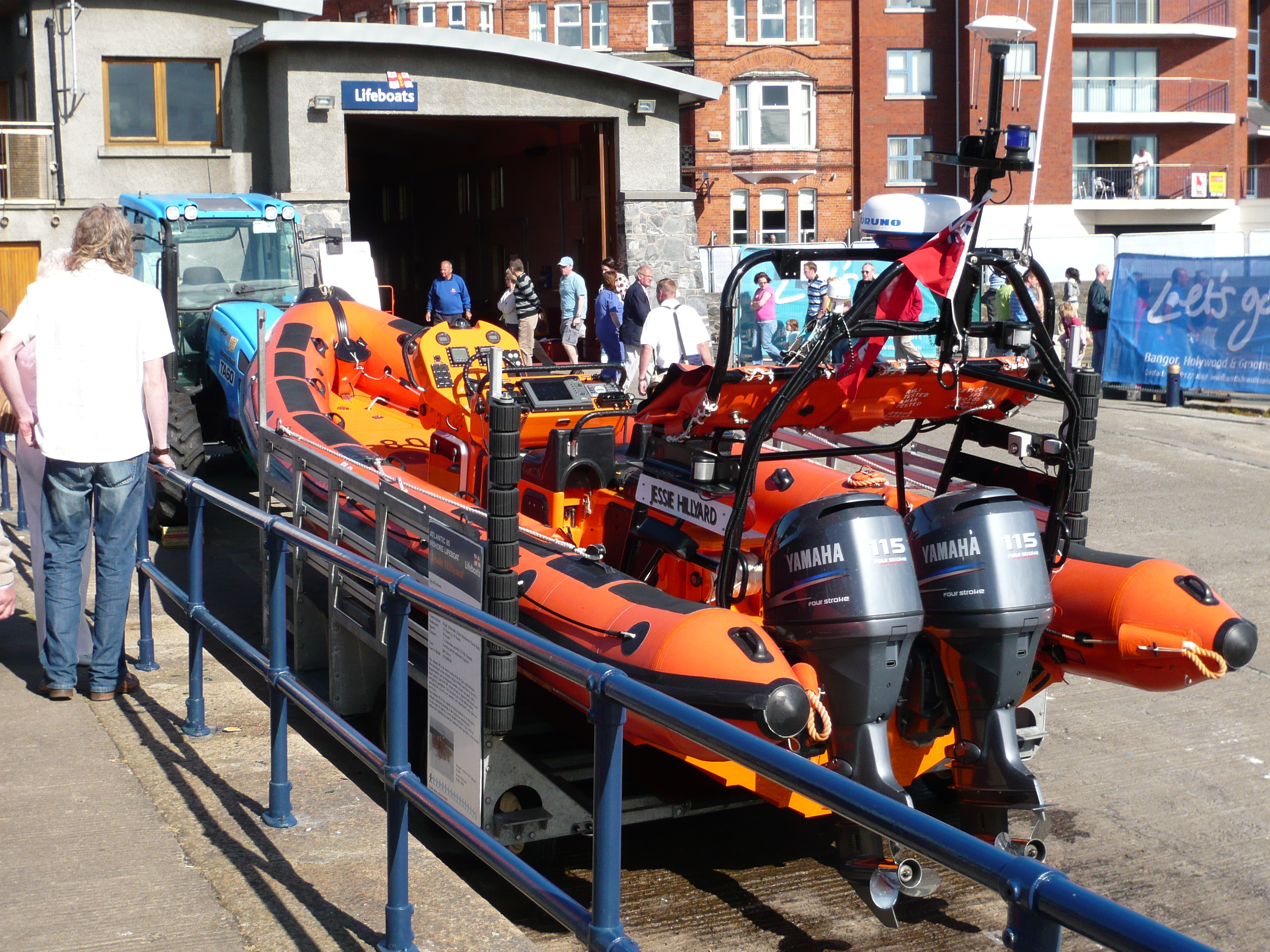
Atlantic 85 B-805 launching in Bangor in 2008

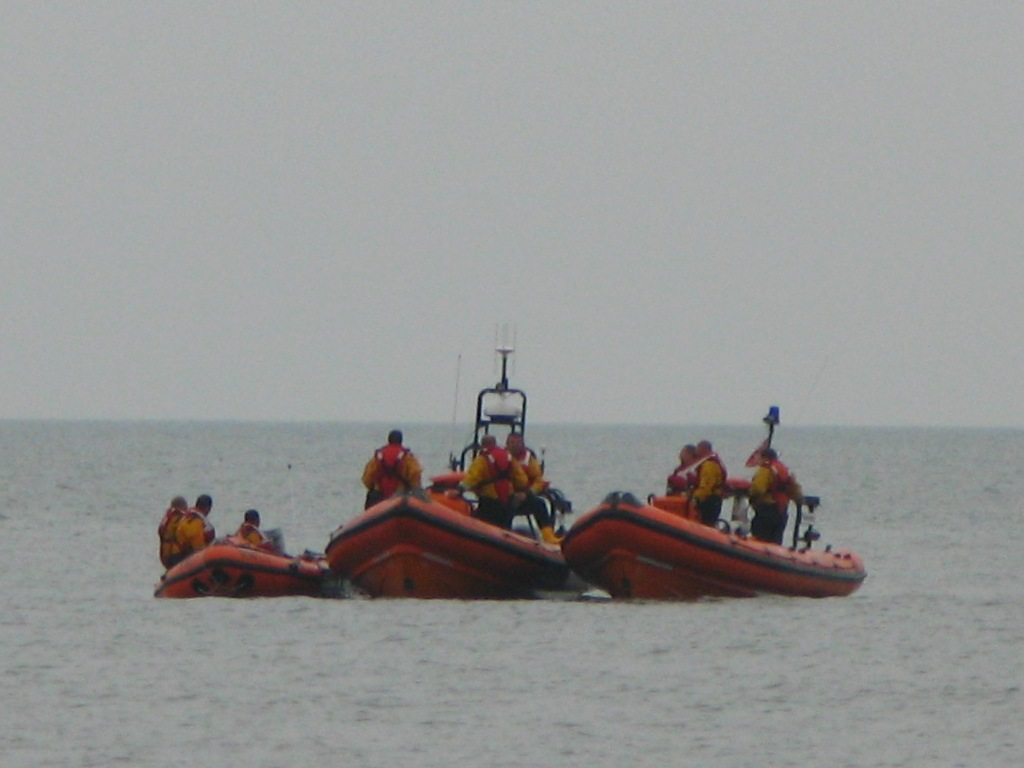
Atlantic 85 B-824 with an Atlantic 75 & a D class in 2010

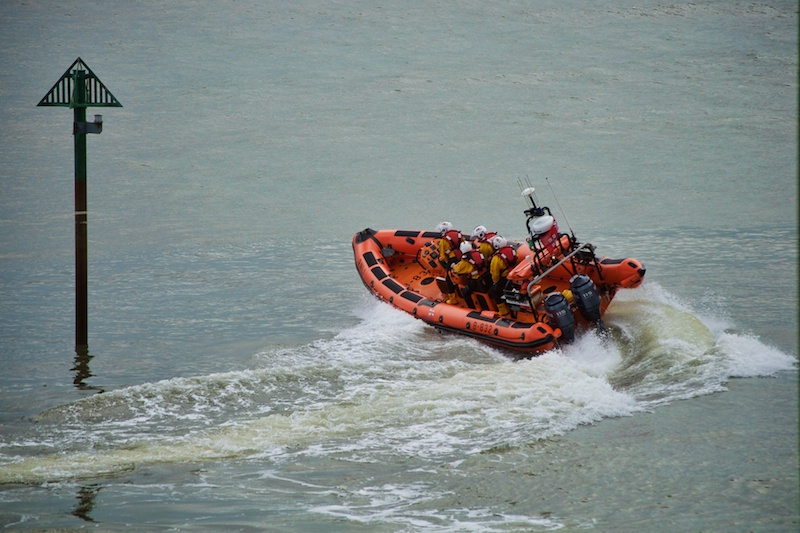
Atlantic 85 B-832 in Porthcawl in 2011

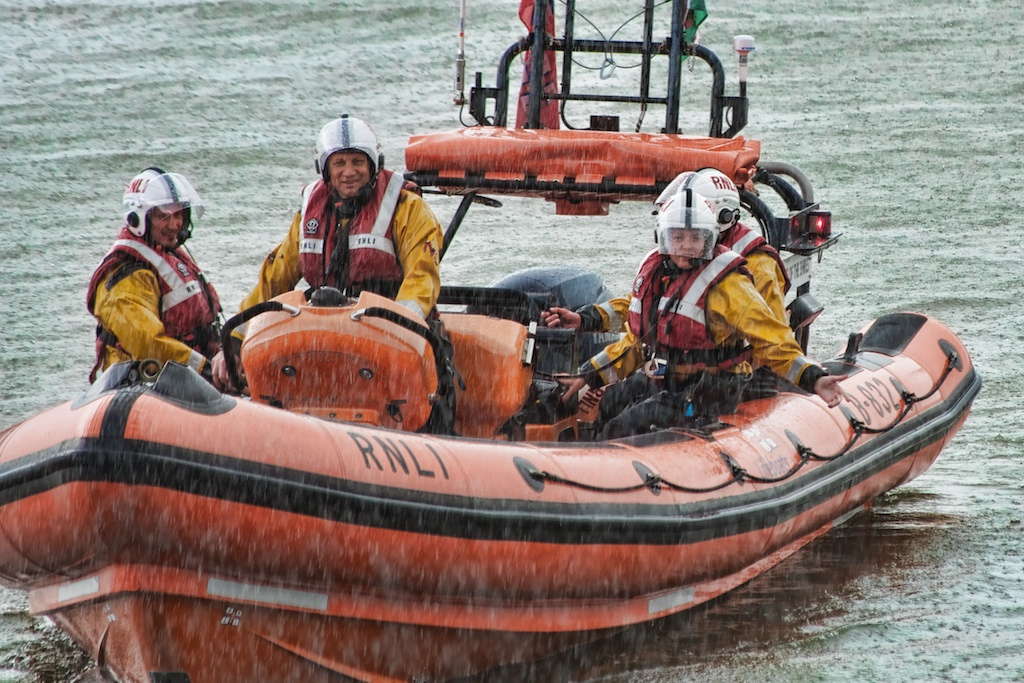
Atlantic 85 B-832 in Porthcawl in 2011

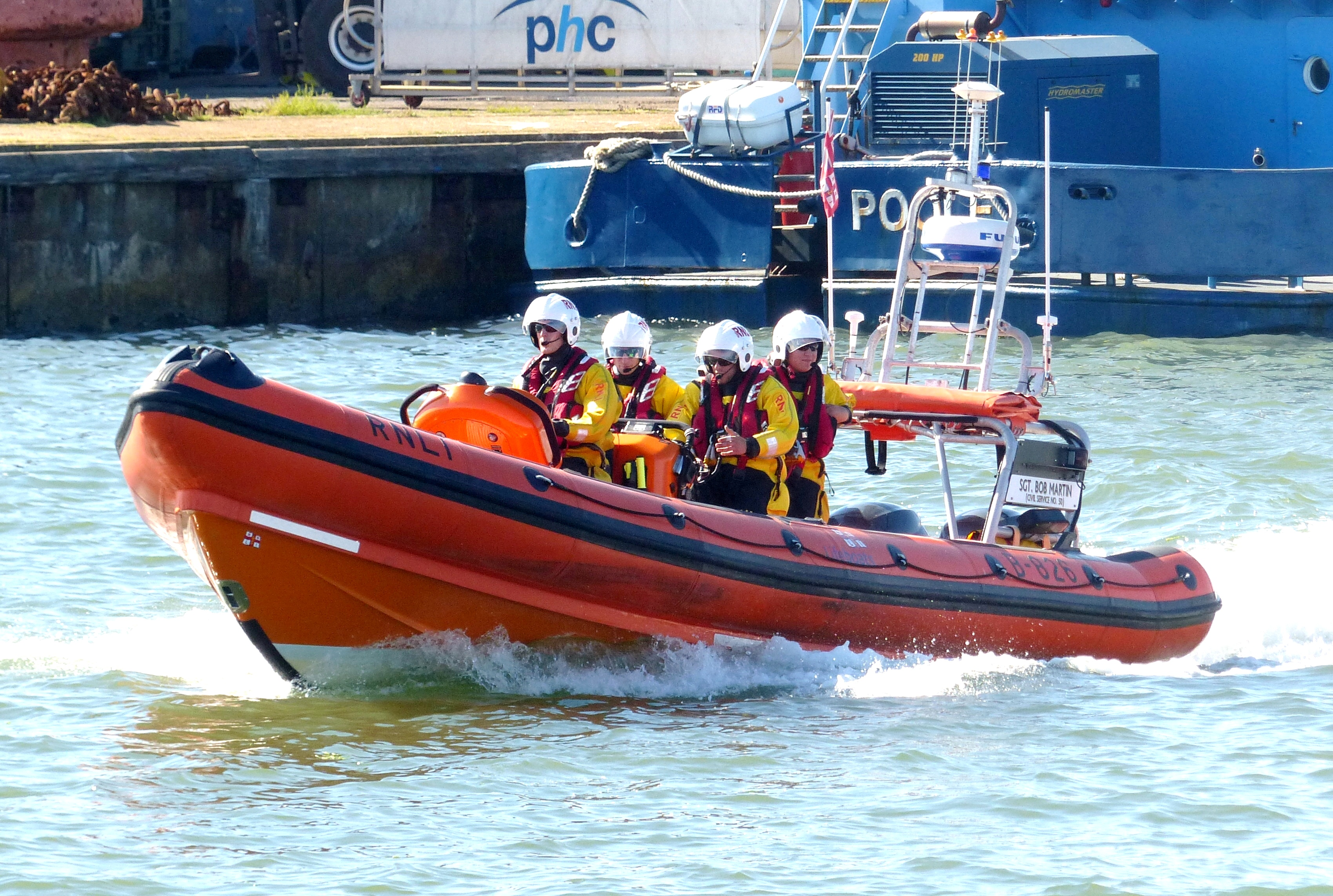
Atlantic 85 (B-826) at Poole in 2017

== Atlantic 85 fleet ==
=== B-800 – B-899 ===
Op.No. (Note: Op.No. is the RNLI's operational number of the boat)	Name	In service	Station	Comments
B-800; B-PO2	Unnamed	–	Prototype	Sold in 2024 to HG Marine
B-801	The Drayton Manor	2004–2006	Trials	Sold in 2024 to ICE SAR
B-801	The Drayton Manor	2006	Relief fleet	Sold in 2024 to ICE SAR
B-801	The Drayton Manor	2006	Tower	Sold in 2024 to ICE SAR
B-801	The Drayton Manor	2006–2014	Relief fleet	Sold in 2024 to ICE SAR
B-801	The Drayton Manor	2014–2017	Training fleet	Sold in 2024 to ICE SAR
B-801	The Drayton Manor	2017–2021	Relief fleet	Sold in 2024 to ICE SAR
B-801	The Drayton Manor	2021–2022	Training fleet	Sold in 2024 to ICE SAR
B-801	The Drayton Manor	2024–	ICE SAR	Sold in 2024 to ICE SAR
B-802	Chelsea Flower Show	2006–2015	Relief fleet	
B-802C	Chelsea Flower Show	2015–	Training fleet	
B-803	William Hurst	2006–2019	Relief fleet	
B-803C	William Hurst	2020–	Training fleet	
B-804	Lydia Macdonald	2006–2022	Macduff	Sold in 2024 to Freshwater Bay
B-804	The Jillian Scott: Spirit of the West Wight V	2024–	Freshwater Bay	Sold in 2024 to Freshwater Bay
B-805	Jessie Hillyard	2006–2024	Bangor	Sold in 2024 to Finland SAR
B-805	Jessie Hillyard	2024–	Finland Lifeboat Inst.	Sold in 2024 to Finland SAR
B-806	Mudeford Servant (Civil Service No. 48)	2006–2024	Mudeford	Sold in 2024 to River Yar boatyard, IOW
B-807	Mary Lewis	2006–2017	Relief fleet	Sold in 2024 to Neptune Marine Services
B-807	Mary Lewis	2017–2024	Training fleet	Sold in 2024 to Neptune Marine Services
B-808	Donald McLauchlan	2006–2025	Walmer	Conversion as Mk. 4 prototype.
B-808	Donald McLauchlan	2025–	Inshore Lifeboat Centre	Conversion as Mk. 4 prototype.
B-809	The Two Annes	2006–2024	Teignmouth	Sold in 2024. In service with Bote Salvavidas de Valparaíso, Chile, Jan 2026
B-809	The Two Annes	2026–	Valparaíso	Sold in 2024. In service with Bote Salvavidas de Valparaíso, Chile, Jan 2026
B-810	Tabbycat	2006–2008	Relief fleet	Sold in 2022. With Merseyside Fire and Rescue Marine Unit.
B-810	Tabbycat	2008–2012	Cowes	Sold in 2022. With Merseyside Fire and Rescue Marine Unit.
B-810	Tabbycat	2012–2021	Relief fleet	Sold in 2022. With Merseyside Fire and Rescue Marine Unit.
B-810	Tabbycat	2021–2022	Training fleet	Sold in 2022. With Merseyside Fire and Rescue Marine Unit.
B-810	Tabbycat	2023–	Merseyside Fire and Rescue Service	Sold in 2022. With Merseyside Fire and Rescue Marine Unit.
B-811	Hylton Burdon	2007–2022	Cullercoats	Sold in 2022. With Merseyside Fire and Rescue Marine Unit.
B-811	Hylton Burdon	2023–	Merseyside Fire and Rescue Service	Sold in 2022. With Merseyside Fire and Rescue Marine Unit.
B-812	Frank William Walton	2006–2026	Kilkeel	
B-813	Muriel and Leslie	2006–2025	Port Erin	Sold 2026. FP Engineering Solutions, Southport.
B-814	Sheila Stenhouse	2006–2026	Kirkcudbright	Placed at Hastings for training, October 2026.
B-814	Sheila Stenhouse	2026–	Relief fleet	Placed at Hastings for training, October 2026.
B-815	Peterborough Beer Festival III	2006–2021	Relief fleet	Sold in 2024 to British Overseas territory
B-815	Peterborough Beer Festival III	2021–2022	Margate	Sold in 2024 to British Overseas territory
B-815	Peterborough Beer Festival III	2022–2024	Training fleet	Sold in 2024 to British Overseas territory
B-816	David Page	2007–2022	St Helier	Sold in 2024 to British Overseas territory
B-816	David Page	2022–2024	Relief Fleet	Sold in 2024 to British Overseas territory
B-817	Wolseley	2007–2024	Sunderland	Sold 2024, to Iceland ICE-SAR
B-817	Wolseley	2024–	ICE-SAR	Sold 2024, to Iceland ICE-SAR
B-818	The Oddfellows	2007–	Sheringham	
B-819	Minnie and Ernest George Barry	2007–2026	Lough Swilly	Sold in 2026. Finland Lifeboat Institution.
B-819	Minnie and Ernest George Barry	2026–	Finland Lifeboat Inst.	Sold in 2026. Finland Lifeboat Institution.
B-820	Elizabeth Jane Palmer	2007–2026	Flamborough	Sold in 2026.
B-821	Gladys Mildred	2007–2023	Newquay	Sold in 2023. Iceland ICE-SAR
B-821	Gladys Mildred	2023–	ICE-SAR	Sold in 2023. Iceland ICE-SAR
B-822	Spirit of Friendship	2007–2023	Aberystwyth	Sold 2024, to Björgunarsveitin Ársæll, Iceland SAR
B-822	Spirit of Friendship	2024–	Reykjavík	Sold 2024, to Björgunarsveitin Ársæll, Iceland SAR
B-823	Doris Joan	2007–2023	Criccieth	
B-823	Spirit of Hornsea	2024–	Hornsea Inshore Rescue	
B-824	Richard and Elizabeth Deaves	2007–2023	Minehead	Donated 2025, to Royal Montserrat Police Service
B-825	Norma Ethel Vinall	2008–2020	Relief fleet	
B-825	Norma Ethel Vinall	2020–2022	Dart	
B-825	Norma Ethel Vinall	2022–	Training fleet	
B-826	Sgt. Bob Martin (Civil Service No. 50)	2008–2026	Poole	
B-827	Olive Laura Deare II	2008–	Gravesend	
B-828	Elaine and Don Wilkinson	2008–	Silloth	
B-829	Derrick Battle	2009–2025	Hayling Island	Converted for Mk. 4 Atlantic 85 trials
B-829	Derrick Battle	2025–	Inshore Lifeboat Centre	Converted for Mk. 4 Atlantic 85 trials
B-830	Douglas Murray	2008–2021	Relief fleet	
B-830	Douglas Murray	2021–2023	Weston-super-Mare	
B-830	Douglas Murray	2024–	Relief fleet	
B-831	Joy Morris MBE	2009–	St Bees	
B-832	Rose of The Shires	2009–	Porthcawl	
B-833	Blue Peter V	2009–	Portaferry	
B-834	William Henry Liddington	2009–	Bundoran	
B-835	Martin Harvey	2009–2024	Relief fleet	
B-835	Martin Harvey	2024–2025	Training fleet	
B-835	Martin Harvey	2025–	Relief fleet	
B-836	Tommy Niven	2009–	Kinghorn	
B-837	Charles Dibdin (Civil Service No.51)	2009–	New Brighton	
B-838	Annette Mary Liddington	2010–	Beaumaris	
B-839	Maureen Lillian	2010–	Penarth	
B-840	Harold Bains	2010–2022	Training fleet	
B-840	Harold Bains	2022–2023	Relief fleet	
B-840	Harold Bains	2023–	Training fleet	
B-841	Eric W. Wilson	2010–	St Catherine	
B-842	Hello Herbie	2010–2015	Rye Harbour	
B-843	Geoffrey Charles	2010–	Red Bay	
B-844	Edith Louise Eastwick	2010–	Kilrush	
B-845	James Dugdale	2010–2015	Relief fleet	
B-845	James Dugdale	2015–2021	Training fleet	
B-845	James Dugdale	2021–2025	Relief fleet	
B-845	James Dugdale	2025–2026	Fowey	
B-845	James Dugdale	2026–	Relief fleet	
B-846	Norma T	2010–	Portsmouth	
B-847	Hereford Endeavour	2010–	Trearddur Bay	
B-848	Spirit of West Norfolk	2011–	Hunstanton	
B-849	Tony and Robert Britt	2011–	Burnham-on-Crouch	
B-850	Edna May	2011–2024	Relief fleet	
B-850	Edna May	2024–	Training fleet	
B-851	Jimmie Cairncross	2012–	Queensferry	
B-852	Random Harvest	2011–	Brighton	
B-853	Binny	2011–	Galway	
B-854	R. A. Wilson	2011–	Largs	
B-855	Eric C. Guest	2011–2016	Relief fleet	
B-855	Eric C. Guest	2016–2020	Training fleet	
B-855	Eric C. Guest	2020	Berwick-upon-Tweed (Eval.)	
B-855	Eric C. Guest	2020–2022	Relief fleet	
B-855	Eric C. Guest	2022–	Training fleet	
B-856	Spirit of Fred. Olsen	2011–	Kyle of Lochalsh	
B-857	Spirit of Loch Fyne	2012–	Lyme Regis	
B-858	Leicester Challenge III	2012–	Redcar	
B-859	Sheena Louise	2012–	Cowes	
B-860	Max Walls	2012–	Calshot	
B-861	Glanely	2012–	Appledore	
B-862	James and Helen Mason	2012–	Tighnabruaich	
B-863	David Porter MPS	2012–2025	Clacton-on-Sea	
B-863	David Porter MPS	2025–	Relief fleet	
B-864	Richard Wake Burdon	2012–	Newbiggin	
B-865	Malcolm and Mona Bennett-Williams	2012–2022	Relief fleet	
B-865	Malcolm and Mona Bennett-Williams	2022–2024	Training fleet	
B-865	Malcolm and Mona Bennett-Williams	2024–	Relief fleet	
B-866	Louis Simson	2013–	Skerries	
B-867	William and Eleanor	2013–	Blackpool	
B-868	Annie Tranmer	2013–	Southwold	
B-869	Joyce King	2013–	Clifden	
B-870	John and Louisa Fisher	2013–2021	Relief fleet	
B-870	John and Louisa Fisher	2021–2025	Leverburgh	
B-870	John and Louisa Fisher	2025–	Relief fleet	
B-871	Albatross	2013–	Cardigan	
B-872	Toby Rundle	2014–	Clovelly	
B-873	Robert and Isobel Mowat	2014–	Kessock	
B-874	Robert Armstrong	2014–	Helvick Head	
B-875	Alexander	2014–2015	Relief fleet	
B-875	Alexander	2015–2017	Rye Harbour	
B-875	Alexander	2018–2023	Relief fleet	
B-875	Alexander	2023–	Weston-super-Mare	
B-876	Rachael Hedderwick	2014–	Arran (Lamlash)	
B-877	Lewisco	2014–	Whitstable	
B-878	Claire and David Delves	2014–	Ramsgate	
B-879	Just George	2014–	West Mersea	
B-880	Martin Frederick Whitehouse	2014–	Relief fleet	
B-881	Solihull	2015–	Hartlepool	
B-882	David Bradley	2015–	Lymington	
B-883	Roy Snewin	2015–	Relief fleet	
B-884	My Lady Anne	2015–	Portishead	
B-885	Julia & Angus Wright	2016–	Southend-on-Sea	
B-886	Peter and Ann Setten	2015–	Abersoch	
B-887	Jacqueline Saville	2015–	Mablethorpe	
B-888	Sheila & Dennis Tongue	2015–	Sligo Bay	
B-889	Elizabeth and Maraget Milligan	2015–2019	Relief fleet	
B-889	Elizabeth and Maraget Milligan	2019–2024	St Peter Port	
B-889	Elizabeth and Maraget Milligan	2024–	Relief fleet	
B-890	Gordon and Phil	2016–	Youghal	
B-891	Renée Sherman	2016–	Littlehampton	
B-892	John and Janet	2016–	Crosshaven	
B-893	Mollie and Ivor Dent	2016–	Penlee	
B-894	Sheila & Dennis Tongue II	2016–	Looe	
B-895	Irene Cornford	2016–	Relief fleet	
B-896	Hugh Miles	2016–	Aberdovey	
B-897	Sheila & Dennis Tongue III	2016–	Staithes and Runswick	
B-898	Susan Margaret Forsbrey	2017–	Relief fleet	
B-899	Howard Bell	2017–2023	Happisburgh	
B-899	Howard Bell	2024–2025	Aldeburgh	
B-899	Howard Bell	2025–	Relief fleet	

=== B-900 – B-999 ===
Op.No.	Name	In service	Station (Note: (Brackets) used to signify that a boat is assigned to a specific station, but isn't yet at that location.)	Comments
B-900	Hello Herbie II	2017–	Rye Harbour	
B-901	Enid Foster MBE	2017–	Relief fleet	
B-902	Sheila & Dennis Tongue IV	2018–	Loch Ness	
B-903	Angus and Muriel Mackay	2017–	Helensburgh	
B-904	Douglas, Euan and Kay Richards	2017–	Carrybridge	
B-905	Gladys Hilda Mustoe	2018–	Salcombe	
B-906	Charles Lucock	2018–	Relief Fleet	
B-907	Tierney Harvey & Sonny Reid	2018–	Harwich	
B-908	Annabel E. Jones	2018–	Plymouth	
B-909	Miss Sally Anne (Baggy) II; Never Fear, Baggy's Here	2018–	Kinsale	
B-910	Rita Daphne Smyth	2018–	Baltimore	
B-911	Jean Spier	2019–	Lough Derg	
B-912	John and Jean Lewis	2018–	Enniskillen	
B-913	Pride of Fred. Olsen	2019	Relief Fleet	
B-913	Pride of Fred. Olsen	2019	Stonehaven	
B-913	Pride of Fred. Olsen	2019–2020	Relief Fleet	
B-913	Pride of Fred. Olsen	2020–2021	Filey	
B-913	Pride of Fred. Olsen	2021–2024	Berwick-upon-Tweed	
B-914	Doris Day and Brian	2019–	Burnham-on-Sea	
B-915	The Missus Barrie	2019–	Burry Port	
B-916	Robina Nixon Chard	2019–	Falmouth	
B-917	Jack & Phyl Cleare	2021–	Weymouth	
B-918	Ted Dawber	2019–	Relief Fleet	
B-919	Jamie Hunter	2019–	Stonehaven	
B-920	Tara Scougall	2019–	Lough Ree	
B-921	Vivacious Atlantic	2019–	Relief Fleet	
B-922	Jean McIvor	2020–	Littlestone-on-Sea	
B-923	Patricia Southall	2021–	Blyth	
B-924	Christine and Raymond Fielding	2021–	Union Hall	
B-925	John Rowntree	2021–	Gt. Yarmouth & Gorleston	
B-926	Julie Poole	2021–	Relief fleet	
B-927	Dylan Rotchell	2021–2023	Relief fleet	
B-927	Dylan Rotchell	2023–2025	Arbroath	
B-927	Dylan Rotchell	2025–	Relief fleet	
B-928	Marjorie Shepherd	2021–	Filey	
B-929	Paul and Stella Rowsell	2021–	Relief fleet	
B-930	Colonel Stock	2022–	Margate	
B-931	Frank C Samworth	2022–	Dart	
B-932	Pamela Rosemary Dashwood	2022–	Relief fleet	
B-933	Skipasund	2022–	Macduff	
B-934	The Spirit of St Helier	2022–	St Helier	
B-935	Daddy's Girl	2022–	Cullercoats	
B-936	Uncle Johnny	2023–	Newquay	
B-937	Florence and Ernest Bowles	2023–	Aberystwyth	
B-938	Frank Townley	2023–	Criccieth	
B-939	Penny J II	2023–	Minehead	
B-940	Penny J	2024–	Berwick-upon-Tweed	
B-941	Sam and Freda Parkinson	2024–	Relief fleet	
B-942	Loving You	2025–	Cleethorpes	
B-943	Harold Hobbs	2024–	St Peter Port	
B-944	Ruby Robinson	2024–	Bangor	
B-945	SeaGil	2024–	Sunderland	
B-946	Spirit of Cooperation	2024–	Relief fleet	
B-947	Claude and Kath	2024–	Teignmouth	
B-948	Herietta H	2024–	Mudeford	
B-949	Ralph	2025–	Aldeburgh	
B-950	Hounslow Branch	2025–	Walmer	
B-951	Neil Crowe	2025–	Port Erin	
B-952	George D Dow	2026–	Kirkcudbright	
B-953	Oddfellows - Making Friends, Helping People	tbc	(Sheringham)	
B-954	June Marshall	2025–	Arbroath	
B-955	Berylium	2025–	Newcastle	
B-956	Spirit of Daisy	2026–	Fowey	
B-957	Patrick and Dianne O'Connor	2026–	Ilfracombe	
B-958	Davdot	2026–	Lough Swilly	
B-959	Forever Yibba	2026–	Flamborough	
B-960	Bill Haran	2026–	Relief fleet	
B-961	Joan-Ray	2026–	Poole	
B-962	Donald Forrester	tbc		In production
B-963	Florence Mary Hope	tbc	(Silloth)	In production
B-964	Clark	2025–	Hayling Island	
B-964	Sundawn	tbc	(St Bees)	In production

== See also ==
- List of RNLI stations
- List of former RNLI stations
- Independent lifeboats in Britain and Ireland
- Talus MB-H amphibious tractor
- Talus MB-4H amphibious tractor
- Talus MB-764 amphibious tractor
- Talus Atlantic 85 DO-DO launch carriage
