= Cowes Lifeboat Station =

RNLI lifeboat station on the Isle of Wight

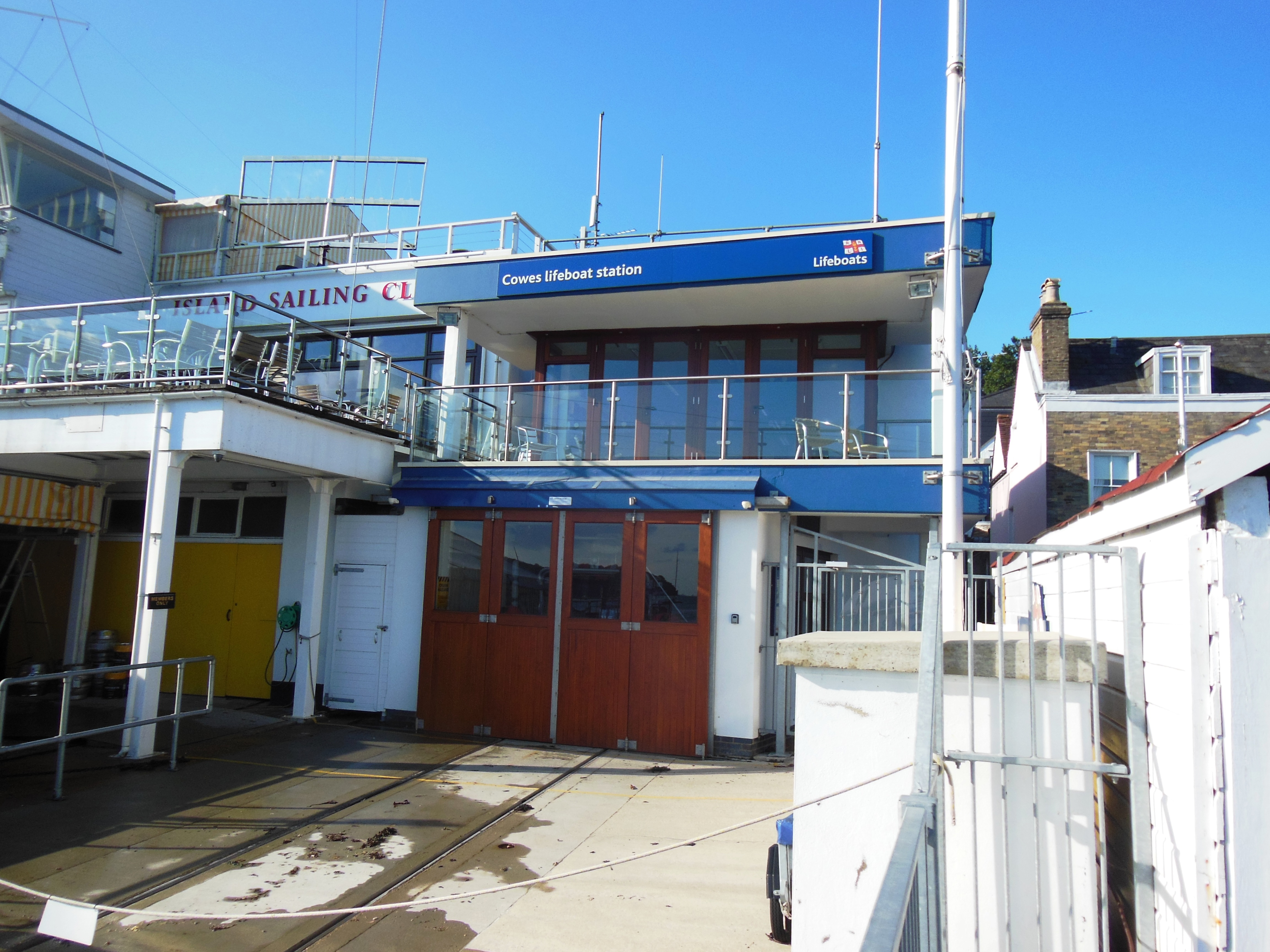
- Cowes Lifeboat Station

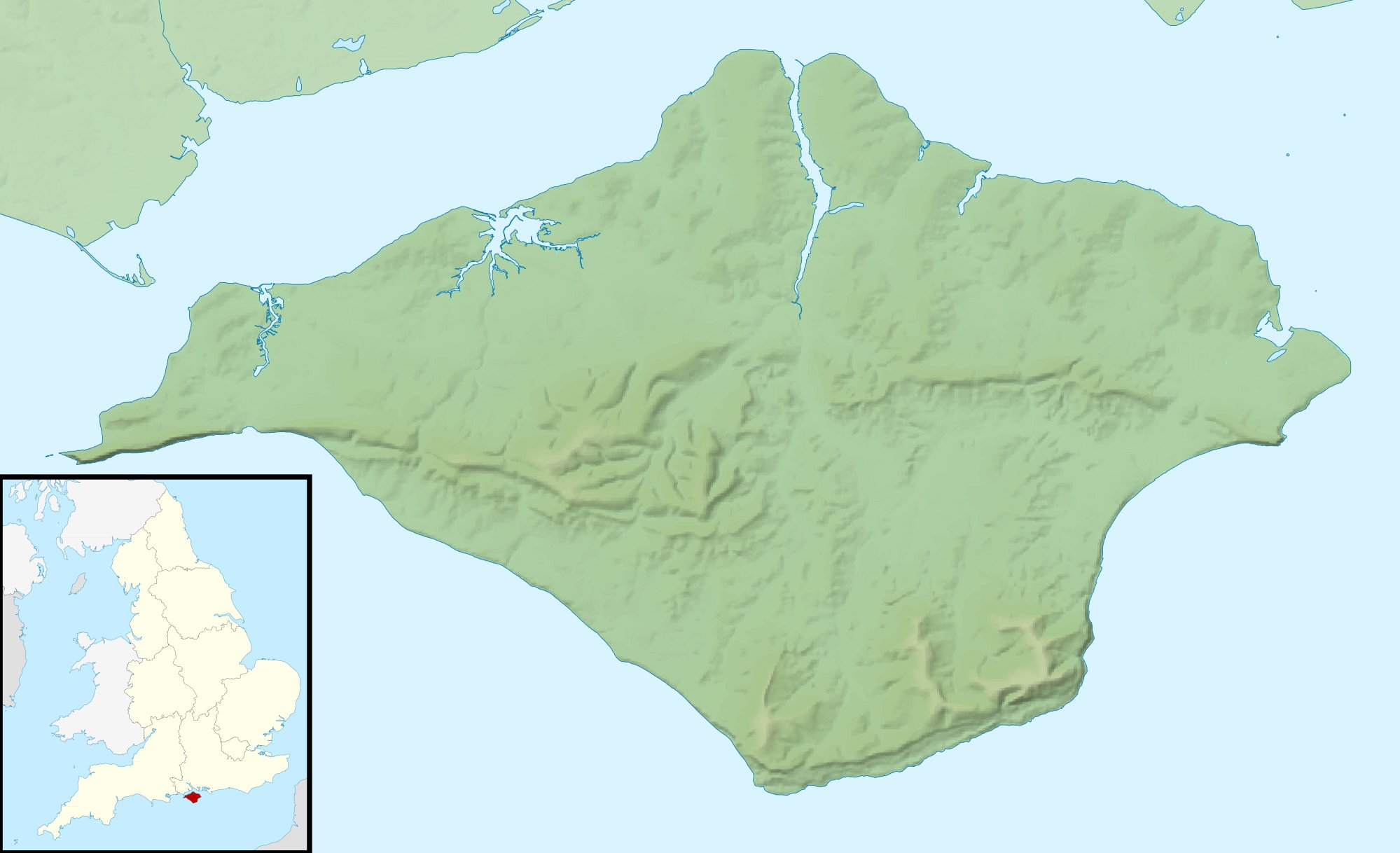
- Location within Isle of Wight
- Former names: Cowes Inshore Lifeboat

General information
- Type: RNLI Lifeboat Station
- Location: Watch House Lane, Cowes, Isle of Wight, PO31 7QH, England
- Coordinates: 50°45′52.9″N 1°17′53.7″W
- Opened: CIL 1989–2008; RNLI 2008–present
- Owner: Royal National Lifeboat Institution

Website
- Cowes RNLI Lifeboat Station

Cowes Lifeboat Station is located in the old Customs House, at the end of Watch House Lane, in Cowes, a town located on the west bank of the River Medina estuary, at the northern tip of the Isle of Wight, overlooking the Solent.

The independent Cowes Inshore Lifeboat (CIL) was stationed at Cowes in 1989. Management of the station was taken over by the Royal National Lifeboat Institution (RNLI) in 2008.

The station currently operates the B-class (Atlantic 85) Inshore lifeboat Sheena Louise (B-859), on station since 2012.

== History ==
A lifeboat was first placed at Cowes at Easter 1989, when 'Cowes Inshore Lifeboat' (CIL) began operations from a base at Shepards Wharf, Medina Road, Cowes. The CIL was a full member of the Solent Sea-Rescue Organisation (SSRO), and under the direct control of H.M. Coastguard at Lee-on-the-Solent. The SSRO was set up by Hampshire County Council in 1977, in partnership with maritime local authorities around the Solent as the umbrella organisation supporting beach and sea rescue units in the area. It became a registered charity in 1979.

The organisation was primarily funded through numerous fundraising events, collections, donations and sponsorship, and also received a small grant from Hampshire County Council, who coordinated the collection of contributions from supporting Local Authorities, including the Isle of Wight Council, which was then distributed through the Solent Sea-Rescue Organisation.

CIL operated for 19 years, and during that time, operated three lifeboats. On average, the number of call-outs was around 35–40 each year, with approximately 100–120 people assisted each year. In July 1995, a new 7.4 m (24 ft) Tornado RIB was named Spirit of Cowes by The Princess Royal.

The RNLI received a formal request from the Trustees of Cowes Inshore lifeboat in 2008, requesting that the RNLI take over operations on the Cowes lifeboat. This was agreed, and a B-class (Atlantic 85), Tabbycat (B-810) was placed on service on 1 July 2008.

In 2009, it was announced that the RNLI had acquired the old customs watch house, with plans to convert it to house the Inshore lifeboat, and move from their existing base, still at Shepards Wharf.

At a ceremony on 25 July 2012, the new boathouse was officially opened by Her Majesty The Queen. Having arrived on station on 9 June 2012, to replace Tabbycat (B-810), a new B-class (Atlantic 85) Inshore lifeboat was named Sheena Louise (B-859), in memory of keen sailor Sheena Louise Pollock of Kent.

== Cowes lifeboats ==
=== Cowes Inshore Lifeboat (CIL) ===
Name	On station	Class	Comments
Unnamed	1989–1995	Avon 6 m (20 ft) Searider RIB	(Note: Avon 6 m (20 ft) RIB, with twin 75-hp Yamaha engines.)
Spirit of Cowes	1995–2001	Tornado 7.4 m (24 ft) RIB	(Note: Tornado 7.4 m (24 ft) RIB, with twin 115-hp Yamaha engines.)
Spirit of Cowes	2002–2008	Barbarian 8.9 m (29 ft) RIB	(Note: Barbarian 8.9 m (29 ft) RIB, with twin 225-hp Honda four-stroke engines, costing £100,000)

=== RNLI ===
Op. No. (Note: Op. No. is the RNLI's Operational Number of the boat carried on the hull.)	Name	On station	Class	Comments
B-810	Tabbycat	2008–2012	B-class (Atlantic 85)	
B-859	Sheena Louise	2012–	B-class (Atlantic 85)	

== See also ==
- List of RNLI stations
- List of former RNLI stations
- Independent lifeboats in Britain and Ireland
