= Berwick-upon-Tweed Lifeboat Station =

RNLI lifeboat station in Northumberland, England

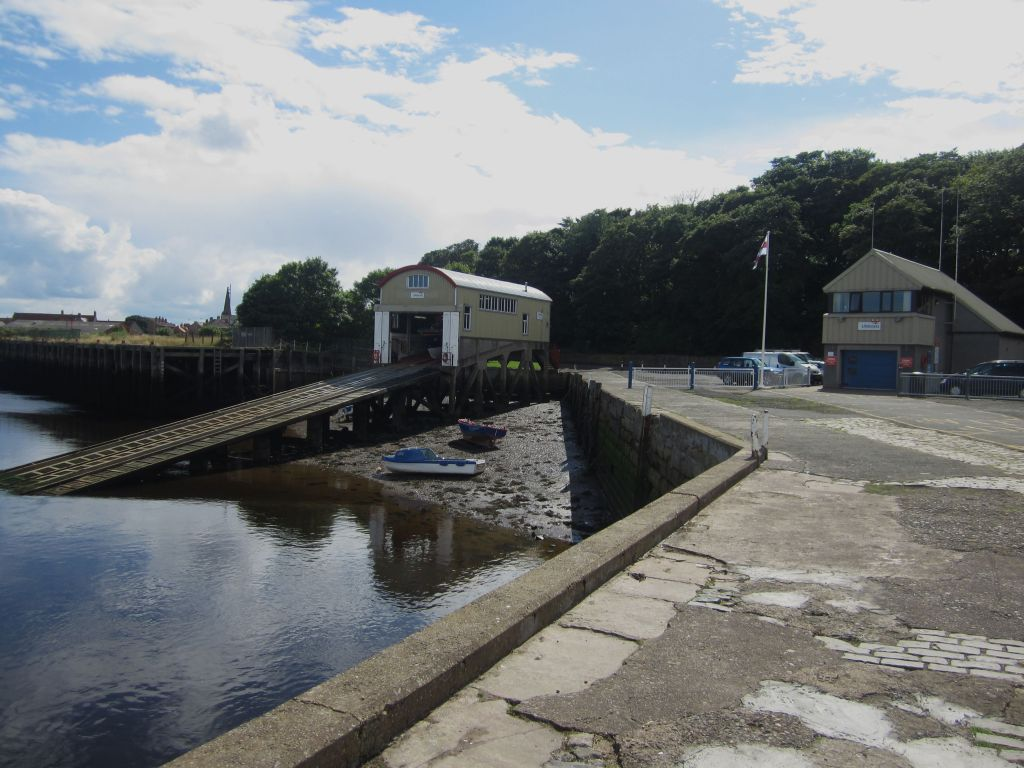
- Berwick-upon-Tweed Lifeboat Station

- Location within Northumberland

General information
- Type: RNLI Lifeboat Station
- Location: Berwick-upon-Tweed Lifeboat Station, Dock Road, Tweedmouth, Berwick-upon-Tweed, Northumberland, TD15 2BE, England
- Coordinates: 55°45′39.5″N 2°00′01.9″W
- Opened: 1835
- Owner: Royal National Lifeboat Institution

Website
- Berwick-upon-Tweed RNLI lifeboat station

Berwick-upon-Tweed Lifeboat Station is located on the south bank of the River Tweed at Tweedmouth, part of the town of Berwick-upon-Tweed, in the county of Northumberland, in England.

A lifeboat was first provided by the Royal National Institution for the Preservation of Life from Shipwreck (RNIPLS) in 1835, located at Spittal, and managed by the Berwick Lifeboat Association. The station closed in 1852, when the lifeboat was deemed unfit for service, but was reopened in 1855 by the Royal National Lifeboat Institution (RNLI).

The station currently operates a B-class (Atlantic 85) Inshore lifeboat Penny J (B-940), on station since 2024, and a smaller D-class (IB1) Inshore lifeboat Glenis Joan Felstead (D-900), on station since 2025.

== History ==
On 9 November 1834, the vessel Christiana, on passage from Stockholm, capsized and sank off Berwick-upon-Tweed with the loss of all hands. A few days later, H.M. Coastguard officer Capt. Hay, RN, wrote to the RNIPLS, to request that a lifeboat be placed at Berwick upon Tweed. Further letters followed from Mr. Thomas Gilchrist, Town Clerk, and Mr. Robert Home, Solicitor.

The request was agreed, and a 26-foot non-self-righting Palmer-type lifeboat was transported to Berwick by steam-packet, arriving on 30 January 1835. A boathouse was constructed at Spittal, on the south bank of the River Tweed. Funds for the provision of the lifeboat had been found locally. The lifeboat was handed to the care of the Berwick Lifeboat Association, with Robert Home appointed Honorary Secretary.

When the schooner Margaret was driven ashore at Spittal on 8 April 1838, the Berwick lifeboat was launched into heavy seas. 6 crewmen were taken off the vessel, and returned to shore. Before the lifeboat could return, the vessel broke up, and the Master was drowned. Lt. David Rymer, RN, H.M. Coastguard, who was in charge of the lifeboat, was awarded the RNLI Gold Medal.

On inspection in the early 1850s, the Berwick lifeboat was found to be unfit for service, and the Berwick Lifeboat Association didn't have the funds to replace the boat. On 2 November 1854, it was agreed that the RNLI would take over management of the Berwick-upon-Tweed Lifeboat Station. A new 30-foot Peake-class lifeboat was ordered from Forrestt, arriving in Berwick in October 1855. A new boathouse at Spittal was constructed in 1859, costing £149-5s-5d.

The Berwick lifeboat would save 5 men from the schooner Epimachus on 18 December 1861, on passage from South Shields to Fisherrow when she was damaged in a collision with a brig.

The lifeboat was capsized on 29 March 1863 while on routine exercise. As a result, it was decided to provide a larger boat, and a 33-foot lifeboat arrived in April 1864. With approval from H.R.H. The Prince of Wales, later Edward VII, the lifeboat was named Albert Victor after his recently born son, Prince Albert Victor, Duke of Clarence and Avondale.

On 1 January 1877, the Albert Victor was launched to the aid of the barque Result of Guernsey, rescuing all 9 crew. Such was the cold, that all lifeboatmen suffered from exposure, and one lifeboatman Thomas Elliott later died.

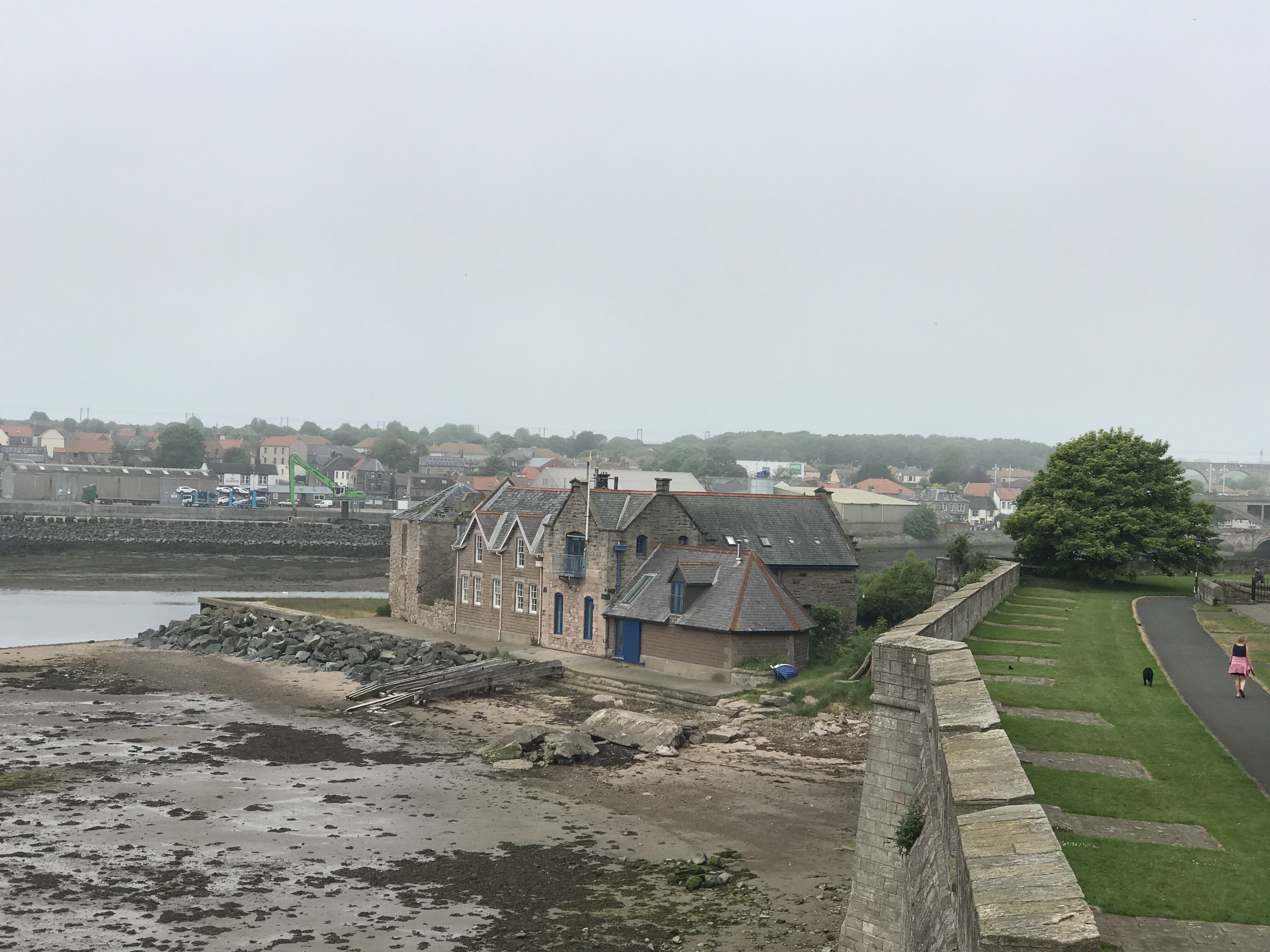
1901 Lifeboat Station

By 1900, there had long been difficulties raising a crew at Spittal. It was decided to relocate the lifeboat to the north bank of the River Tweed, on the Berwick town side, where a crew could always be found. A new boathouse was constructed at Ferry Landing in 1901, costing £867-2s-11d. It had doors at each end, so the boat could be launched one way into the river, or the other way on a carriage, to be conveyed along the coast, should that be required.

The barque Jacob Rauers of Gothenburg, on passage to Grangemouth with timber, was wrecked in Marshall Meadows Bay on 29 March 1913. The Matthew Simpson (ON 512) was launched just after 9:30pm. Unable to get along side, the lifeboat used the method of 'veering down', by dropping anchor, and allowing a line out to get near the casualty. Getting within 60 feet (18 m) of the Jacob Rauers, a line was thrown across, and one by one, 11 men were hauled through the surf to the lifeboat, landing them at Berwick at 2:00am. For this service, Coxswain Robert Burgon and Second Coxswain James Jamieson were awarded with Silver Medals from the Swedish Government. Burgon would also receive the RNLI Silver Medal. Robert Burgon would be drowned when his fishing boat sank in 1927

It was announced that a new motor-lifeboat would be placed at Berwick in 1927. A new boathouse and slipway needed to be constructed, with the most suitable site being back across the river again, on the south side at Spittal. It was completed in 1928, at a cost of £4,600, and the new boat, a 35ft 6in Self-righting motor lifeboat Westmorland (ON 727), arrived on 21 February 1930. However, after nine years, the RNLI had decided that a larger boat was required at Berwick. The Westmorland was sent away for overhaul in 1939, returning to service at Cullercoats in 1940. The Berwick station was closed while the 1928 boathouse was dismantled, and reconstructed just up river at Tweedmouth, on top of concrete pilings, with a deep-water slipway. This boathouse is still in use today. The station reopened when a 40ft 6in Watson motor lifeboat J. and W. (ON 722) was placed on service in 1940.

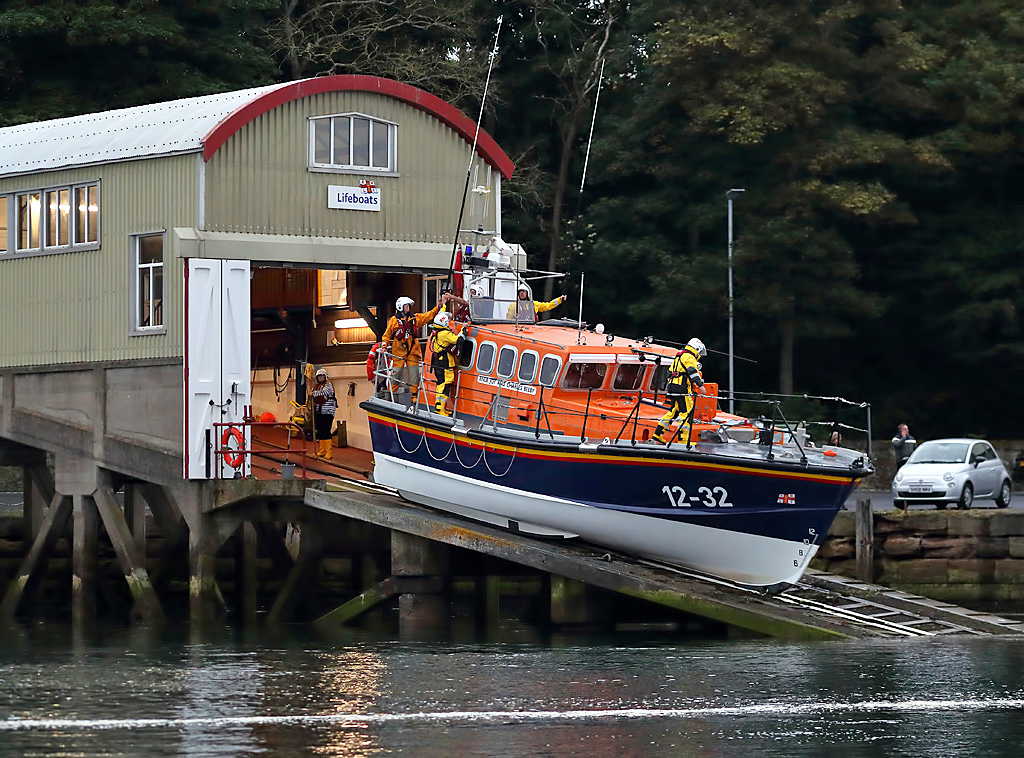
Mersey-class lifeboat 12-32 Joy and Charles Beeby

In 1976, it was decided to withdraw the All-weather lifeboat, and place the B-class (Atlantic 21) Inshore lifeboat R. A. O. B. (B-535) on station.

This decision was reversed some 17 years later, when it was announced that an All-weather lifeboat would once again be placed at Berwick-upon-Tweed. The Atlantic 21-class Inshore lifeboat Elizabeth Bestwick (B-541), adapted to be permanently afloat, was assigned to the station temporarily, until modifications were carried out on the boathouse to accommodate a Mersey-class lifeboat.

The new 12 m (39 ft) Mersey-class lifeboat arrived on station on 5 February 1993. At a service of dedication and naming ceremony at Carr Rock Pier on 23 March 1993, the lifeboat was named 12-32 Joy and Charles Beeby (ON 1191) by HRH The Duchess of Kent.

In 2020, another B-class (Atlantic 85) Inshore lifeboat Eric C Guest (B-855) was sent to the station for evaluation, followed by a permanently assigned Atlantic 85 Pride of Fred. Olsen (B-913) in 2021.

With the consideration that fast 25-knot Shannon-class lifeboats had been placed at Seahouses to the south, and at Eyemouth, just 8 miles (13 km) to the north, it was announced in October 2022, that once again, the Berwick-upon Tweed All-weather lifeboat would be withdrawn.

The Mersey-class lifeboat 12-32 Joy and Charles Beeby (ON 1191) finally departed for the relief fleet on the 15 April 2023.

In 2024, Berwick-upon-Tweed lifeboat station would receive a new Atlantic 85-class when Penny J (B-940) was placed on service.

== Station honours ==
The following are awards made at Berwick-upon-Tweed

- RNIPLS Gold Medal

Lt. David Rymer, RN, H.M. Coastguard – 1838

- RNIPLS Silver Medal

Lt. Henry Baillie, RN, H.M. Coastguard – 1834

Lt. Edward Bunbury Nott, RN, Revenue Cutter Mermaid – 1838

- RNLI Silver Medal

Dr David Francis Sitwell Cahill, MD – 1855

Alexander Aitchison, Fisherman – 1908

Robert Burgon, Coxswain – 1913

James Jamieson, Acting Coxswain – 1915

- Silver Medal, awarded by the Swedish Government

Robert Burgon, Coxswain – 1913
James Jamieson, Second Coxswain – 1913

- RNLI Bronze Medal

William Shearer, Helm – 1975

- The Thanks of the Institution inscribed on Vellum

Norman Jackson, crew member – 1975

- Testimonial on Parchment, awarded by the Royal Humane Society

William Johnson, Helm – 2005

== Roll of honour ==
In memory of those lost whilst serving Berwick-upon-Tweed lifeboat.

- Died later of exposure, after service to the Result of Guernsey, 1 January 1877

Thomas Elliott (26)

== Berwick-upon-Tweed lifeboats ==
=== Pulling and Sailing (P&S) lifeboats ===
ON (Note: ON is the RNLI's Official Number of the boat.)	Name	Built	On station	Class	Comments
Pre-166	Unnamed	1834	1835–1852	26-foot Palmer	(Note: 26-foot x 6-foot 3in (6-oared) Palmer-class non-self-righting lifeboat, funded by the RNIPLS, built by Harton of Limehouse, London, costing £63.)
No lifeboat available, 1852–1855
Pre-295	Unnamed	1855	1855–1864	30-foot Peake Self-righting (P&S)	(Note: 30-foot x 7-foot 6in (10-oared) Peake-class self-righting (P&S) lifeboat, funded by local subscription, built by Forrestt of Limehouse, London, costing £156.)
Pre-415	Albert Victor	1864	1864–1888	33-foot Peake Self-righting (P&S)	(Note: 33-foot x 8-foot 1in (10-oared) Peake-class self-righting (P&S) lifeboat, funds collected by R. A. Whitworth of Manchester, built by Forrestt of Limehouse, London, costing £250)
201	John and Janet	1888	1888–1903	37-foot Self-righting (P&S)	(Note: 37-foot x 8-foot (12-oared) self-righting (P&S) lifeboat, gift of the late Mrs J. Barr of Kenley, Surrey, built by D. and W. Henderson and Company of Partick, costing £497.)
512	Matthew Simpson	1903	1903–1924	37-foot Self-righting (P&S)	(Note: 37-foot x 9-foot 3in (10-oared) self-righting (P&S) lifeboat, gift of the Misses Simpson of Lancaster, built by Thames Ironworks, of Blackwall, London, costing £928.)
640	Procter	1914	1924–1930	35-foot Rubie Self-righting (P&S)	(Note: 35-foot Dungeness-class (Rubie) self-righting (P&S) lifeboat, gift of the late Mr W. J. Proctor of Newcastle-upon-Tyne, built by Thames Ironworks of Blackwall, London, completed by S. E. Saunders of Cowes, costing £1,251.); Previously at Hayling Island

Pre ON numbers are unofficial numbers used by the Lifeboat Enthusiast Society to reference early lifeboats not included on the official RNLI list.

=== All-weather lifeboats ===
ON	Op. No. (Note: Op. No. is the RNLI's Operational Number of the boat carried on the hull.)	Name	Built	On station	Class	Comments
727	–	Westmorland	1930	1930–1939	35-foot 6in Self-righting (motor)	(Note: 35-foot 6in Self-righting motor lifeboat, built by Saunders-Roe of Cowes. Single 35 hp Weyburn AE6 petrol-engine, giving 7.5 knots, costing £4,597)
Station closed during reconstruction of the boathouse, 1939–1940
722	–	J. and W.	1929	1940–1957	40-foot 6in Watson (motor)	(Note: 40-foot 6in Watson-class motor lifeboat, built by J. Samuel White of Cowes. Single 50 hp Weyburn CE4 petrol-engine, giving 7.7 knots, costing £6,052); Previously at Portpatrick
941	–	William and Mary Durham	1957	1957–1976	42-foot Watson	(Note: 42-foot Watson-class lifeboat, built by Wm. Osborne of Littlehampton. Twin 48 hp Gardner 4LW engines giving 8 knots, costing £29,500)
All-weather lifeboat withdrawn 1976, Reintroduced 1993
1191	12-32	Joy and Charles Beeby	1992	1993–2024	Mersey	(Note: 12m Mersey-class lifeboat. FRC hull by Green Marine, fitted out by FBM Ltd of Cowes, twin 285 hp Caterpillar diesel-engines, giving 16 knots)

All-weather lifeboat withdrawn, 2024

=== Inshore lifeboats ===
==== B-class ====
Op. No.	Name	On station	Class	Comments
B-535	R. A. O. B.	1976–1992	B-class (Atlantic 21)	
B-541	Elizabeth Bestwick	1992–1993	B-class (Atlantic 21)	
Atlantic-class lifeboat withdrawn 1993. Reintroduced 2021
B-855	Eric C Guest	2020–2021	B-class (Atlantic 85)	Evaluation
B-913	Pride of Fred. Olsen	2021–2024	B-class (Atlantic 85)	
B-940	Penny J	2024–	B-class (Atlantic 85)	

==== D-class ====
Op. No.	Name	On station	Class	Comments
D-111	Unnamed	1967–1976	D-class (RFD PB16)	
D-class lifeboat withdrawn 1976. Reintroduced 1995
D-433	Marjorie	1995–1996	D-class (EA16)	
D-494	Sunrise	1996–2005	D-class (EA16)	
D-639	Howard and Mary Broadfield	2005–2015	D-class (IB1)	
D-777	Vi and Charles Hogbin	2015–2025	D-class (IB1)	
D-900	Glenis Joan Felstead	2025–	D-class (IB1)	

== See also ==
- List of RNLI stations
- List of former RNLI stations
- Royal National Lifeboat Institution lifeboats
