= Kinsale Lifeboat Station =

RNLI lifeboat station in County Cork, Ireland

- Kinsale Lifeboat Station, County Cork

- Location within Ireland

General information
- Type: RNLI Lifeboat Station
- Location: Adams Quay, Worlds End, Kinsale, County Cork,, Ireland
- Coordinates: 51°42′00.3″N 8°31′04.2″W
- Opened: 11 July 2003
- Owner: Royal National Lifeboat Institution

Website
- Kinsale RNLI Lifeboat Station

Kinsale Lifeboat Station is located at Adams Quay in Kinsale, a historic port and fishing town in County Cork, sitting at the mouth of the River Bandon, on the south coast of Ireland.

The Inshore lifeboat station at Kinsale was established in 2003 by the Royal National Lifeboat Institution (RNLI).

The station currently operates the B-class (Atlantic 85) Inshore lifeboat with the longest name in the RNLI fleet, Miss Sally Anne (Baggy) II, Never Fear, Baggy's Here (B-909), on station since 2018.

== History ==
It is recorded that a lifeboat was first stationed at Kinsale in 1818, operating until 1824. There are no records available of any boats or services.

The Royal National Institution for the Preservation of Life from Shipwreck (RNIPLS), founded in 1824, later to become the RNLI in 1854, would award medals for deeds of gallantry at sea, even if no lifeboats were involved. At 04:00 on 13 January 1826, the brig Eliza was wrecked on Sandycove Island. One boy was lost from the wreck, but in two trips, Lt. Garrett Barry, with five coastguards, managed to rescue the remainder of the crew. Garrett Barry was awarded the RNIPLS Silver Medal.

Some 40 years later, on 8 June 1866, the brigantine Anna, on passage from Kinsale to Cardiff, was wrecked at Hangman's Point, when she hit a sunken rock. In stormy conditions, a woman and child were rescued by a coastguard boat. One of the coastguard crew, boatman Patrick Mackell, at great risk to himself, then waded out into the surf, managing to get a line to the vessel, and five crew were rescued. Patrick Mackell was awarded the RNLI Silver Medal.

It would be another 137 years before a lifeboat was once again stationed at Kinsale. After years of fundraising by the local RNLI branch, it was announced in 2002, that an Inshore lifeboat station was to be established at Kinsale. A base, working out of storage containers and a caravan, was established at Kinsale Yacht Club marina. Selected volunteers were sent for training at the Inshore Lifeboat Centre at Cowes on the Isle of Wight, and the B-class (Atlantic 75) lifeboat Vera Skilton (B-705) arrived on station. At 20:00 on 11 July 2003, the lifeboat station was officially declared operational.

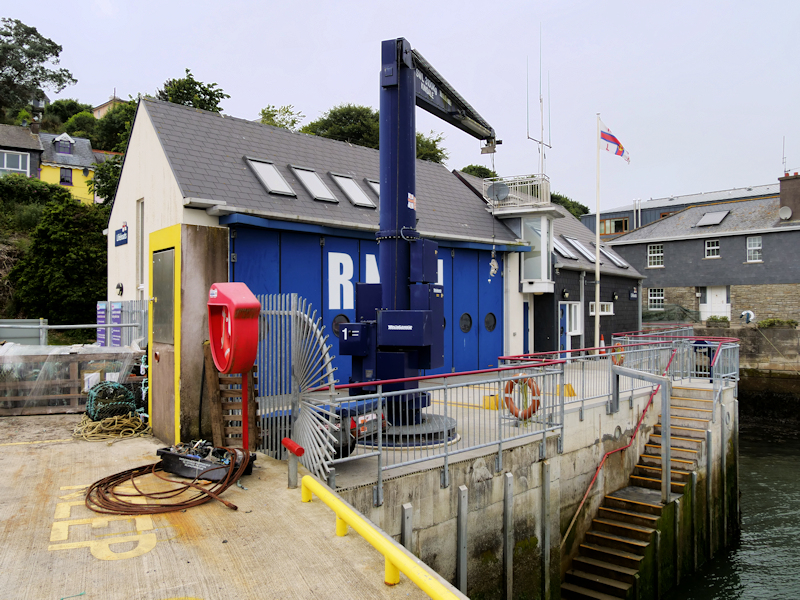
Kinsale Lifeboat Station and Davit

Vera Skilton (B-705) was only at the station for a few months, replaced later in 2003 by another lifeboat built for the relief fleet, Miss Sally Anne (Baggy) (B-796). After first receiving one of the earliest Atlantic 75 lifeboats, B-705, constructed in 1994, the station would receive the very last one, built in 2003. The boat was named at Cowes on 5 November 2003, in recognition of the donor, Miss Sally Anne Odell. When the station was declared as permanent, Miss Sally Anne (Baggy) was also permanently assigned to the station.

Construction of Kinsale's new lifeboat station started in 2009. The station was built at Adams Quay, and along with crew facilities, office and training room, a retail outlet, and boat storage, a Schat davit was installed to lower the lifeboat into the water. Completed later in 2009, the station cost £1,280,000.

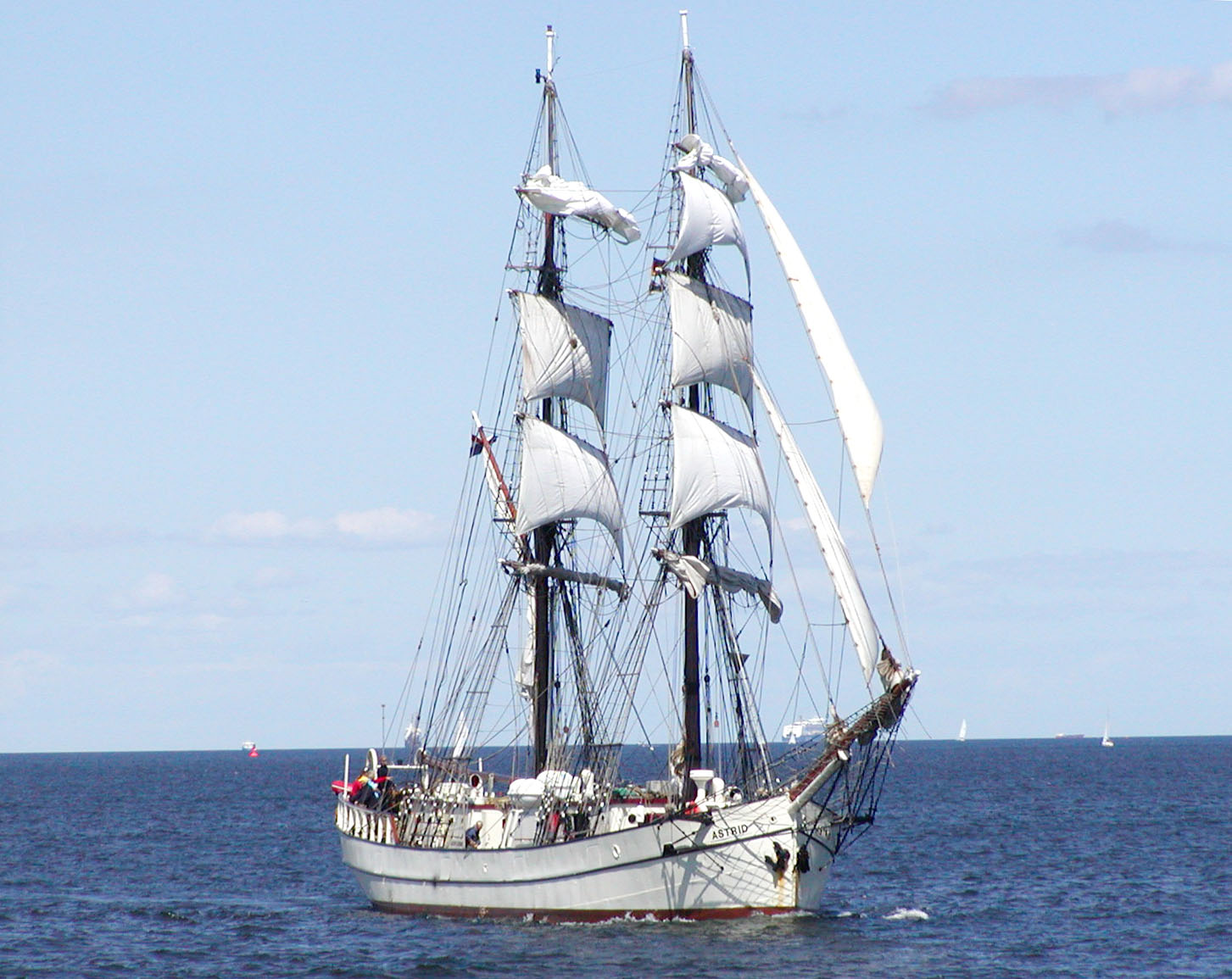
STV Astrid in 2008

Around midday on 24 July 2013, two lifeboats, from Kinsale and Courtmacsherry Harbour were called to the aid of the Sailing Training Vessel Astrid, along with two rescue helicopters. The vessel had suffered engine failure shortly after setting out from Oysterhaven, and was holed when she was blown onto Quay Rock at Ballymacus Point, near the Sovereign Islands, in force 5–6 winds. The Kinsale Inshore lifeboat was quickly on scene. 12 crew were immediately taken aboard the lifeboat, subsequently being transferred to another sailing vessel, the Spirit of Oysterhaven. With the vessel sinking rapidly, the remaining 18 crew disembarked to a life-raft, which was towed to calmer waters by the Inshore lifeboat. Two more lifeboats from Ballycotton and Crosshaven were also tasked, but not required. All 30 crew were saved, but the vessel was a total loss.

At 18:00 on 10 April 2016, crew member Matthew Teehan spotted lifeboat Helm Nick Searls down the street. He knew something was happening - "‘You wouldn’t often see Nicky running." The lifeboat was launched at 18:10, and was on scene within five minutes. The casualty vessel was the Fishing trawler Sean Anthony with three Portuguese fishermen aboard, driven aground on the rocks at the entrance to Kinsale harbour in a force 8–9 gale. With no way of getting the lifeboat in close, the crew had just one option – to jump into the water. All with life-jackets, the three men jumped one by one, quickly picked up by the lifeboat and brought ashore. The rescue would feature in Series 2, Episode 1, of the BBC Television series 'Saving Lives at Sea' in 2018.

In 2018, Miss Sally Anne (Baggy) (B-796) was withdrawn to the relief fleet. Kinsale would receive a new Atlantic 85-class lifeboat, this time funded from the legacy of Miss Sally Anne Odell. At a naming ceremony on Saturday 25 August 2018, the lifeboat was named in accordance with the benefactors wishes, Miss Sally Anne (Baggy) II, Never Fear, Baggy's Here (B-909).

== Miss Sally Anne (Baggy) Odell ==
Sally Anne Odell (1936–2017) was born in Banstead, Surrey, was never married, and had no children. After inheriting a significant sum on the death of her father, she decided that some should be used for some charitable good. On suggesting she wanted to make a substantial gift to the RNLI, she was offered the opportunity to purchase the last of the B-class (Atlantic 75) lifeboats being built at the Inshore Lifeboat Centre in Cowes, Isle of Wight.

I went over to the Isle of Wight in August to see the boat being built - she looked like a fine craft that would serve her crew well. I was very impressed by the set up at the RNLI's boat building facility at Cowes. Everyone was so friendly and it was a very enjoyable day. The RNLI does such a good job in helping people in difficulty and saving lives at sea - it's easy to forget sometimes that they rely on donations from the public to continue their work. It's good to know that I've been able to contribute to such a vitally important cause and long may they continue.

— Miss Sally Anne (Baggy) Odell

The lifeboat was named Miss Sally Anne (Baggy), a joking reference to her 'nickname', a survivor of bowel cancer, but needing a colostomy bag. She would tell everyone, "Better a bag than a box". Familiar with the south coast of Ireland – she was a direct relative of Kay Odell, who took the last known photograph of the RMS Titanic departing Cobh – and on hearing that a new station was to be set up at Kinsale, she requested that her boat be placed there, and retained if the station was made permanent.

Sally was a regular visitor to the station, and was affectionately known by the crew as 'Godmother'. Arriving sometimes at Cobh by cruise ship, it would be 'arranged' for the lifeboat to accompany the vessel into harbour, and she would tell everyone that it was 'her' lifeboat.

When Sally died in 2017, a large box of documentation, letters and news clippings was delivered to the station, items she treasured over the years. Sally also left a bequest of €350,000 to pay for a new boat when it was due, and to be named in such a way, as to represent her sense of humour.

== Station honours ==
The following are awards made at Kinsale.

- RNIPLS Silver Medal
  Lt. Garrett Barry, RN, H.M. Coastguard, Sandy Island – 1826
- RNLI Silver Medal
  Patrick Mackell, Boatman, H.M. Coastguard, Batty's Cove – 1866
- 'The Thanks of the Institution inscribed on Vellum'
  Nicky Searls, crew member – 2006

== Kinsale lifeboats ==
Op.No. (Note: Op.No. is the RNLI's Operational Number of the boat carried on the hull.)	Name	On station	Class	Comments
B-705	Vera Skilton	2003	B-class (Atlantic 75)	
B-796	Miss Sally Anne (Baggy)	2003–2018	B-class (Atlantic 75)	
B-909	Miss Sally Anne (Baggy) II, Never Fear, Baggy's Here	2018–	B-class (Atlantic 85)	

== See also ==
- List of RNLI stations
- List of former RNLI stations
- Royal National Lifeboat Institution lifeboats

== Sources ==
- Leonard, Richie; Denton, Tony (2026). Lifeboat Enthusiasts Handbook 2026. Lifeboats Enthusiasts' Society.
