= Alondra =

Alondra may refer to:

- Alondra (TV series), a Mexican telenovela
- Alondra (given name)
- Alondra (shipwreck), an 1899 English steamer
- Dienogest, a progestin medication
