= Oubre =

Oubre is a surname. Notable people with the surname include:

- Alondra Oubré, American medical anthropologist
- George T. Oubre (1918–1998), American politician
- Kelly Oubre Jr. (born 1995), American basketball player
- Linda Oubré, American college president
- Louis Oubre (born 1958), American football player
