= Hornsea Inshore Rescue =

Independent Search and rescue service in East Riding of Yorkshire, England

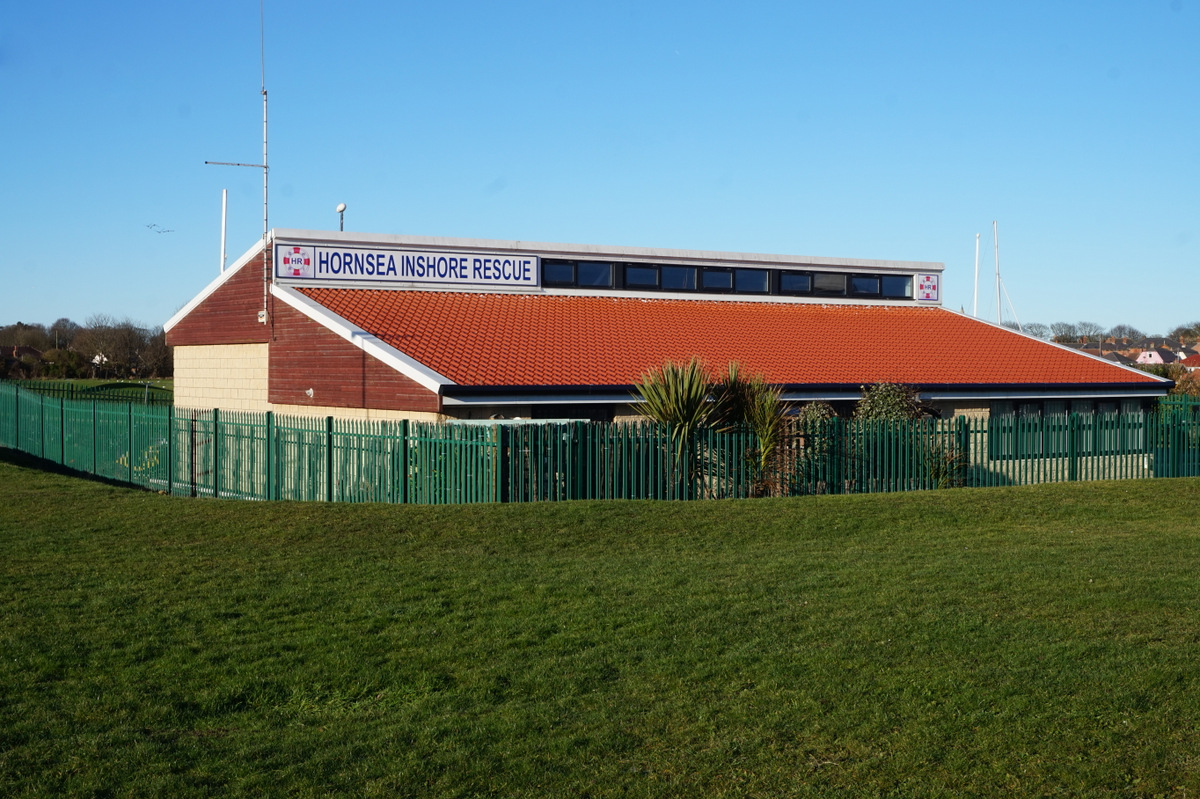
- Hornsea Inshore Rescue

- Hornsea, East Riding of Yorkshire

General information
- Status: Operational
- Type: Lifeboat Station
- Location: The Boat House,, 16 Hornsea Burton Rd, Hornsea, East Riding of Yorkshire, HU18 1TJ, United Kingdom
- Coordinates: 53°54′29.1″N 0°9′32.2″W
- Opened: 1994

Website
- Hornsea Inshore Rescue

Hornsea Inshore Rescue is located at 16 Hornsea Burton Rd in Hornsea, a seaside town and resort sitting approximately 12 miles (19 km) north-east of Hull, on the coast of the East Riding of Yorkshire.

The independent search and rescue (SAR) service was established in 1994, although an RNLI station operated at Hornsea between 1852 and 1924.

Hornsea Inshore Rescue currently operates an Atlantic 85 Inshore lifeboat, The Spirit of Hornsea, on station since 2024.

Hornsea Inshore Rescue is a registered charity (No. 1154954), and has 'Declared Facility' status with H.M. Coastguard.

== History ==
A local committee was formed in Hornsea in 1851, with the aim of establishing a lifeboat station. Needing a lifeboat, carriage and boathouse, a sum of £161 was raised, but even with the donation from Hull Trinity House of a reserve lifeboat needing some repair work, they were still £108 short. Negotiations were then held by chairman John Thorley with The Shipwrecked Fishermen and Mariners' Royal Benevolent Society (SFMRBS), who agreed to take on the management of the station, and paid the £108 required.

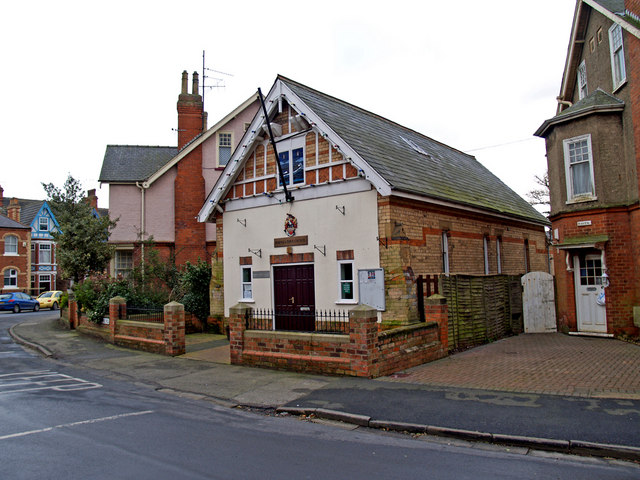
1878 Hornsea lifeboat house

On 7 December 1854, all eight lifeboat stations of the SFMRBS, including Hornsea, were transferred to the management of the Royal National Lifeboat Institution (RNLI).

In 1878, J. Reynard constructed a new boathouse, at the junction of Burton Road and Eastbourne Road, for a cost of £325-18s-0d.

The station remained in operation until 17 January 1924, when it was decided that sufficient rescue cover for the area was provided by the motor-powered lifeboat at Humber Lifeboat Station, and the 'Pulling and Sailing' (P&S) lifeboat at Hornsea, one with oars and sails, was effectively obsolete.

For further information, please see:– Hornsea RNLI Lifeboat Station

== Independent Service ==
After the withdrawal of Hornsea's lifeboat, the nearest lifeboats to Hornsea were at Bridlington, 14 miles (23 km) to the north, and Humber, 28 miles (45 km) to the south at Spurn Point. In 1974, the RNLI reopened the station at Withernsea, 17 miles (27 km) to the south, with a small D-class (RFD PB16) Inshore lifeboat, and in 1975, HM Coastguard reopened their watch station at Hornsea. Whilst the coastguard didn't have a 'lifeboat', their rescue craft, initially a Zodiac inflatable, and later an Avon Searider RIB, provided some level of cover if needed.

When Hornsea coastguard station closed again in the early 1990s, this left no rescue provision for the 31 miles of coastline, regularly enjoyed by locals and holidaymakers. Hornsea Inshore Rescue was established in 1994 with the support of local residents.

Work began in 2008, on the construction of a boat house and education centre at the southern end of South Promenade, next to the Hornsea Day Launch building. The new building was formally opened by H.R.H Anne, Princess Royal on 14 December 2010.

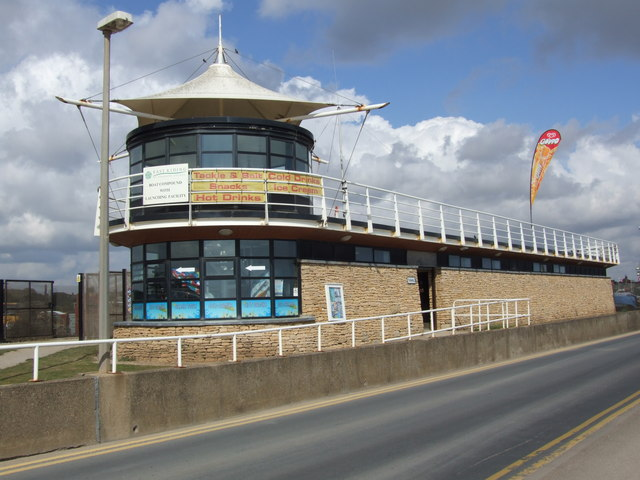
Hornsea Boat launch office and cafe

In 2012, with a view to raising the £35–45,000 per annum required to keep the service operational, Hornsea Inshore Rescue won the contract from East Riding of Yorkshire Council, to operate the Hornsea Day Boat launch office, yard and cafe. A not-for-profit company, Hornsea Rescue Boat Launch Ltd, was established, with the contract starting on 1 April 2012.

2024 would see the arrival of an 8.5 m (28 ft) Atlantic 85 Inshore lifeboat, the first of its class to be sold from service by the RNLI. The boat, first in service at Criccieth from 2007, was first sent to specialist E. P. Barrus of Bicester, for two new marinised 115-hp engines, before being transported to its station free of charge by Neill & Brown Global Logistics of Hessle. The new boat replaced their previous Atlantic 75, also a former RNLI boat, which had been on station since 2019.

A crowdfunding appeal to raise £400,000 was launched in 2025, to construct a cafe on the roof of the boat launch building. The building already operates a small cafe, of which all profits go the maintaining lifeboat operations. Planning permission has been granted, and the development is intended to make best use of the large rooftop area, affording excellent views of the coast.

== Station honours ==
The following are awards made at Hornsea.

- Member, Order of the British Empire (MBE)

Susan Hickson-Marsay, Chair, Station Manager and Training Officer – 2022NYH

== Hornsea independent lifeboats ==
=== Lifeboats ===
Name	Class	On Station	Engine	Comments
Charity Venture	Ribtec RIB	????–2013	Twin 40-hp Mercury	
Spirit of Hornsea	Atlantic 75	2013–2019		Formerly Bessie (B-708) at Minehead and Baltimore
Spirit of Hornsea	Atlantic 75	2019–2024	Twin 90-hp Yamaha	Formerly Duckhams 2001 (B-773) at Carrybridge
Spirit of Hornsea	Atlantic 85	2024–	Twin 115-hp	Formerly Doris Joan (B-823) at Criccieth

== See also ==
- Independent lifeboats in Britain and Ireland
- List of RNLI stations
- List of former RNLI stations
