= Loch Ness Lifeboat Station =

RNLI lifeboat station on Loch Ness, Scotland

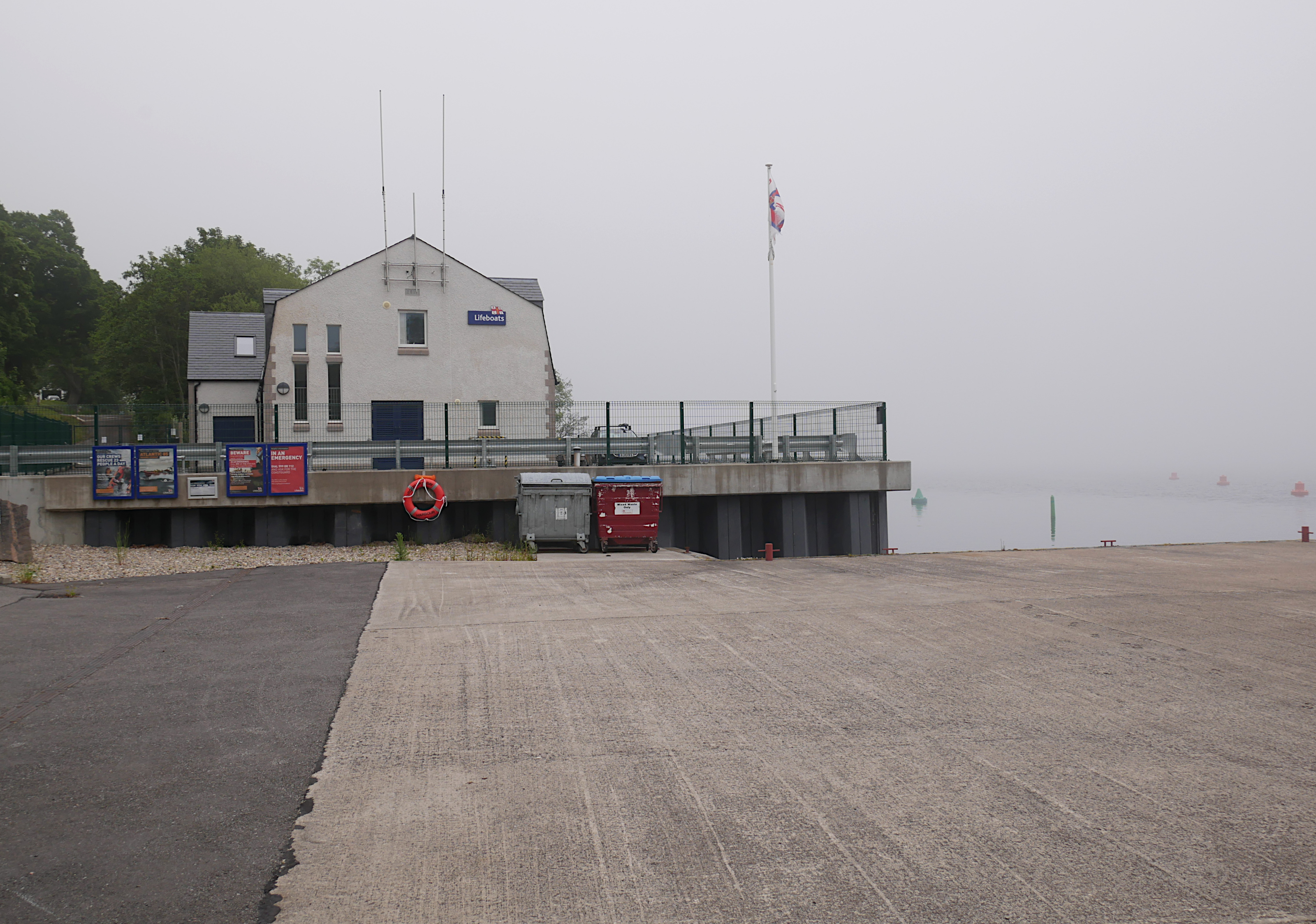
- Loch Ness Lifeboat Station

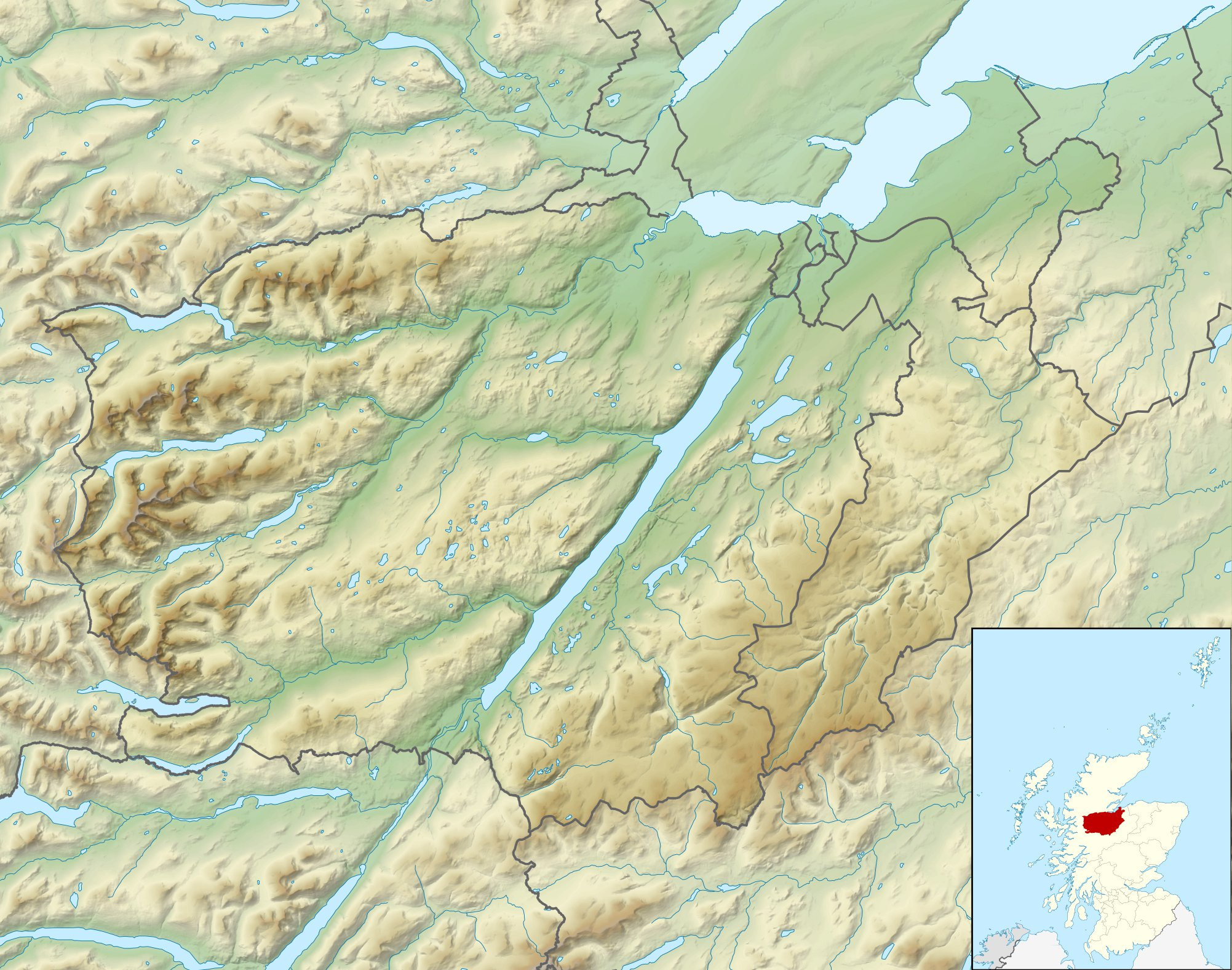
- Location within Inverness area

General information
- Type: RNLI Lifeboat Station
- Location: Urquhart Bay Harbour, Drumnadrochit, Highland, IV63 6XR, Scotland
- Coordinates: 57°20′11.4″N 4°26′54.0″W
- Opened: 2008
- Owner: Royal National Lifeboat Institution

Website
- Loch Ness RNLI Lifeboat Station

Loch Ness Lifeboat Station is located on the A82 at Urquhart Bay, just east of the town of Drumnadrochit, just north of the mid-point of Loch Ness, 13.5 miles (21.7 km) south-east of Inverness, in the Highland region of Scotland.

A rescue boat was first stationed here by H.M. Coastguard in the 1980s. A lifeboat station was established here by the Royal National Lifeboat Institution (RNLI) in 2008.

The station currently operates a B-class (Atlantic 85) Inshore lifeboat, Sheila & Dennis Tongue IV (B-902), on station since 2018.

== History ==
Loch Ness has long played a vital part of the 60 mi (97 km) sea-transit route, down the Great Glen Fault between Inverness and Oban, following the construction of the Caledonian Canal by Thomas Telford in 1822. Vessels of a modest size were able to cut off the dangerous route around north-west Scotland, through the Pentland Firth and around Cape Wrath, but it was only in the 1980s that a rescue service was provided by H.M. Coastguard. In 1996, a boathouse was constructed at Temple Pier at Drumnadrochit, and a 5.5 m (18 ft) RIB powered by a single 74hp engine, capable of 30 knots, was placed on service.

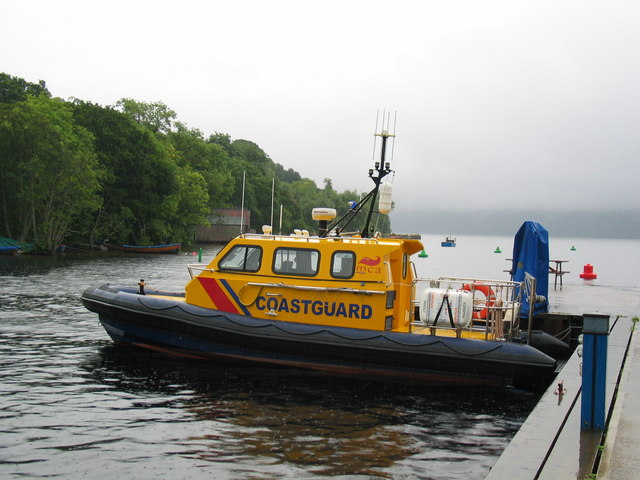
Coastguard boat MCA Harrier

The Marchioness disaster on the River Thames in 1989 highlighted that Inland waterways can also be treacherous, and that there was a need for rescue services. This resulted in the creation of 4 RNLI lifeboat stations on the Thames, at Teddington, Chiswick, Tower, and Gravesend, along with new RNLI stations on the larger waterways in Ireland, such as Lough Derg and Enniskillen.

In 2007, an agreement was drawn up for the transfer of services from H.M. Coastguard at Loch Ness, to the RNLI, and Loch Ness Lifeboat Station began operating on 2 April 2008, following the placement of the B-class (Atlantic 75) lifeboat Mercurious (B-707).

An appeal was launched in 2015 to raise £1million towards the construction of a new station building and boathouse with launching platform. By 13 July, the amount raised was just £45,000 short.

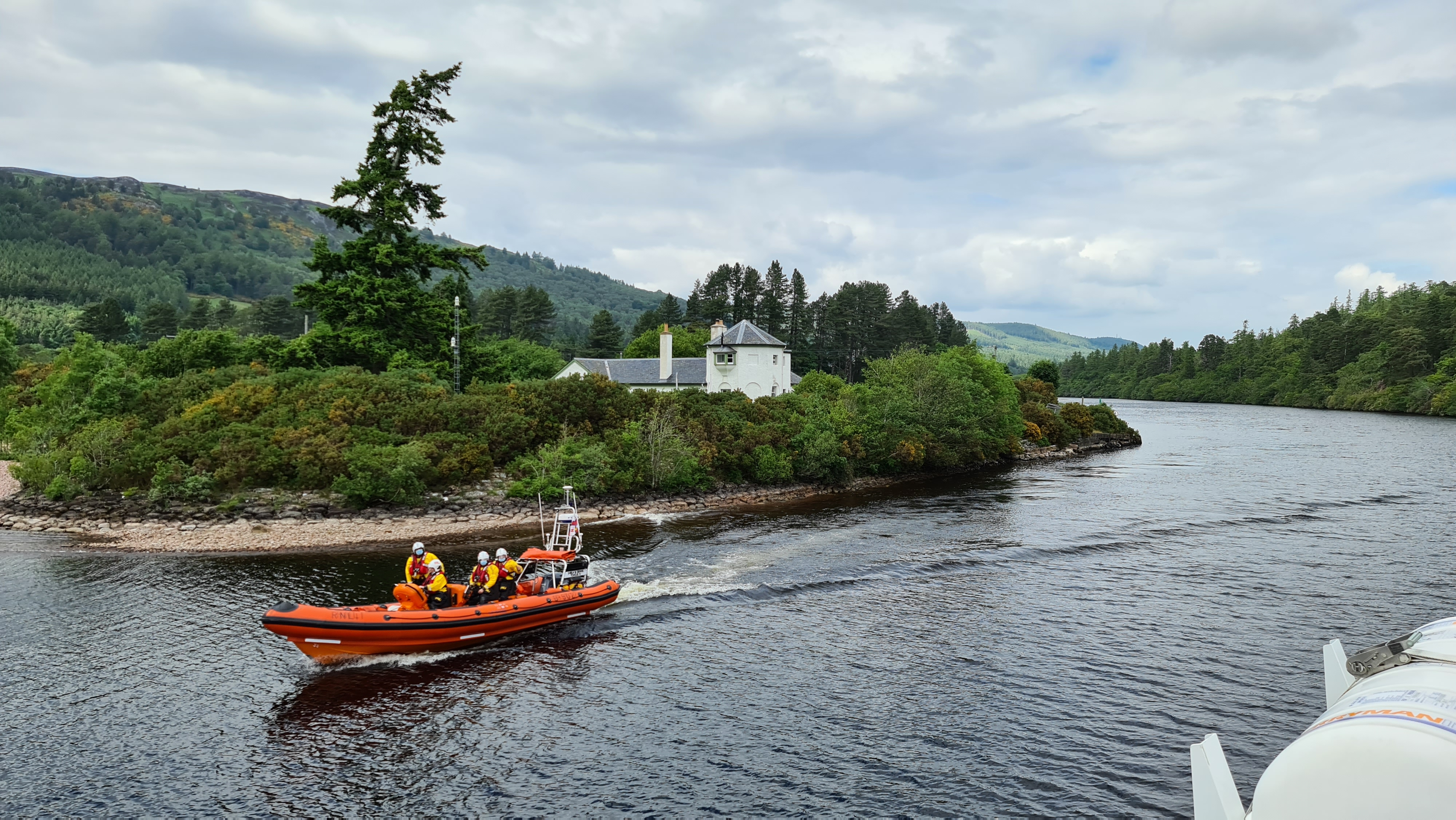
B-class (Atlantic 85) Sheila & Dennis Tongue IV

The new station building sits on top of reclaimed land behind a sheet pile retaining wall, with a boathouse at 90deg facing the water, and a slipway passing through a recess in the retaining wall. A new access road was also created. Construction was completed in December 2017. The rest of the funding for the project, thought to total £2.7million, was met from the generous bequest of Mrs Agnes A. P. Barr, of the Irn-Bru Barr family.

In 2018, the Atlantic 75 lifeboat on station, Colin James Daniel (B-763), one of the last of the class, was withdrawn, and Loch Ness received the new Atlantic 85 Sheila & Dennis Tongue IV (B-902). Funding for the boat was from the bequest of the late Dennis Tongue, of Exeter, who died in 2014. He left provisions in his Will to purchase four Atlantic-class lifeboats, the Loch Ness lifeboat being the last of the four.

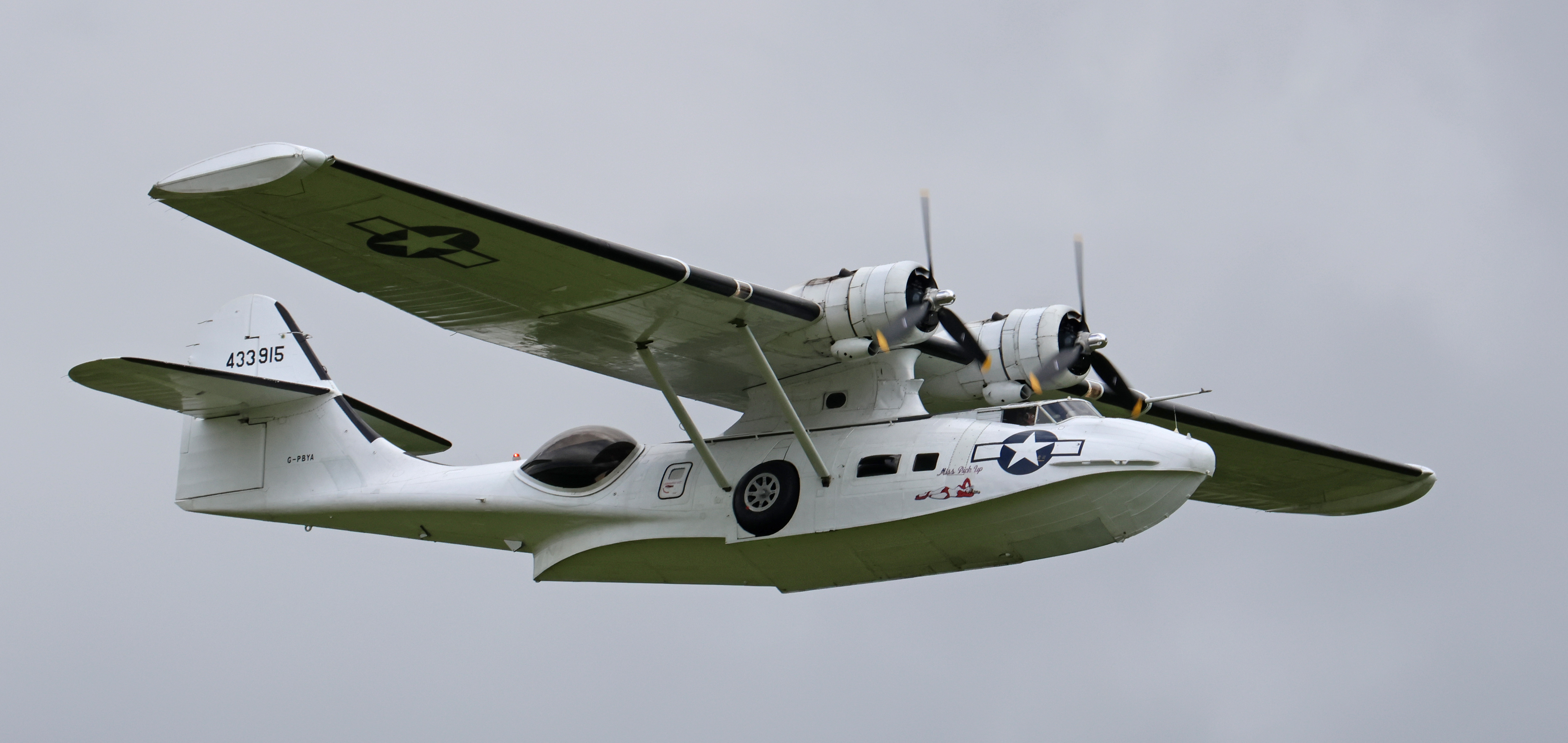
Catalina Flying Boat Miss Pick Up

On 17 October 2020, the Loch Ness lifeboat crew encountered one of the more unusual vessels needing assistance, when they were called to the aid of Miss Pick Up, a World War 2 Consolidated PBY Catalina flying boat. After a day of filming, the aircraft, belonging to the Imperial War Museum Duxford, suffered engine failure before take-off, and was recovered by the RNLI to a mooring buoy. The aircraft was subsequently brought ashore for an engine swap, costing £30,000, much of which was met by an impromptu crowdfunding request, bringing in over two thirds of the cost. Miss Pick Up took off safely on 1 December 2020, and returned to her base at Duxford.

Loch Ness RNLI volunteer Linda Izquierdo-Ross was presented with a Red Cross of Monaco Silver Medal by Albert II, Prince of Monaco in November 2023, for her voluntary service as medical communication at the 'Sortie Tunnel', for the Monaco Grand Prix

In December 2023, Linda Izquierdo-Rossin was asked to present No.120 of the 200 'RNLI 200' anniversary podcasts. Whilst admitting that "its a great place to hide a Monster", she explained that "Loch Ness most definitely is home to at least one monster". Loch Ness is exceptionally deep, water visibility is next to zero, the water is very cold, and without salt, the water of Loch Ness is less buoyant. Highlighting the dangers of the water, it may be that the Loch Ness Monster is Loch Ness itself.

== Loch Ness lifeboats ==
| Op.No. (Note: Op. No. is the RNLI's Operational Number of the boat carried on the hull.) | Name | On station | Class | Comments |
|---|---|---|---|---|
| B-707 | Mercurious | 2008−2011 | B-class (Atlantic 75) | Now on display, at the National Maritime Museum, Falmouth. |
| B-737 | Thelma Glossop | 2011−2013 | B-class (Atlantic 75) | |
| B-763 | Colin James Daniel | 2013−2018 | B-class (Atlantic 75) | |
| B-902 | Sheila & Dennis Tongue IV | 2018− | B-class (Atlantic 85) | |

== See also ==
- List of RNLI stations
- List of former RNLI stations
- Royal National Lifeboat Institution lifeboats
