= Alondra (given name) =

- Gender: female
- Language: Spanish

Origin
- Meaning: "helper and defender of mankind", "defender"

Other names
- Short form: Alo
- See also: Alejandra

Alondra is a feminine given name. It is the Spanish word for "lark". It was the most popular name for girls born in Puerto Rico in 2009.

== People ==
- Alondra Camargo (born 1995), Mexican footballer
- Alondra de la Parra (born 1980), Mexican conductor
- Alondra Hidalgo (born 1989), Mexican voice actress
- Alondra Johnson (born 1965), Canadian Football League linebacker
- Alondra Nelson, American academic and writer
- Alondra Oubré, American female medical anthropologist
