= Hornsea RNLI Lifeboat Station =

Former lifeboat station in the East Riding of Yorkshire, England

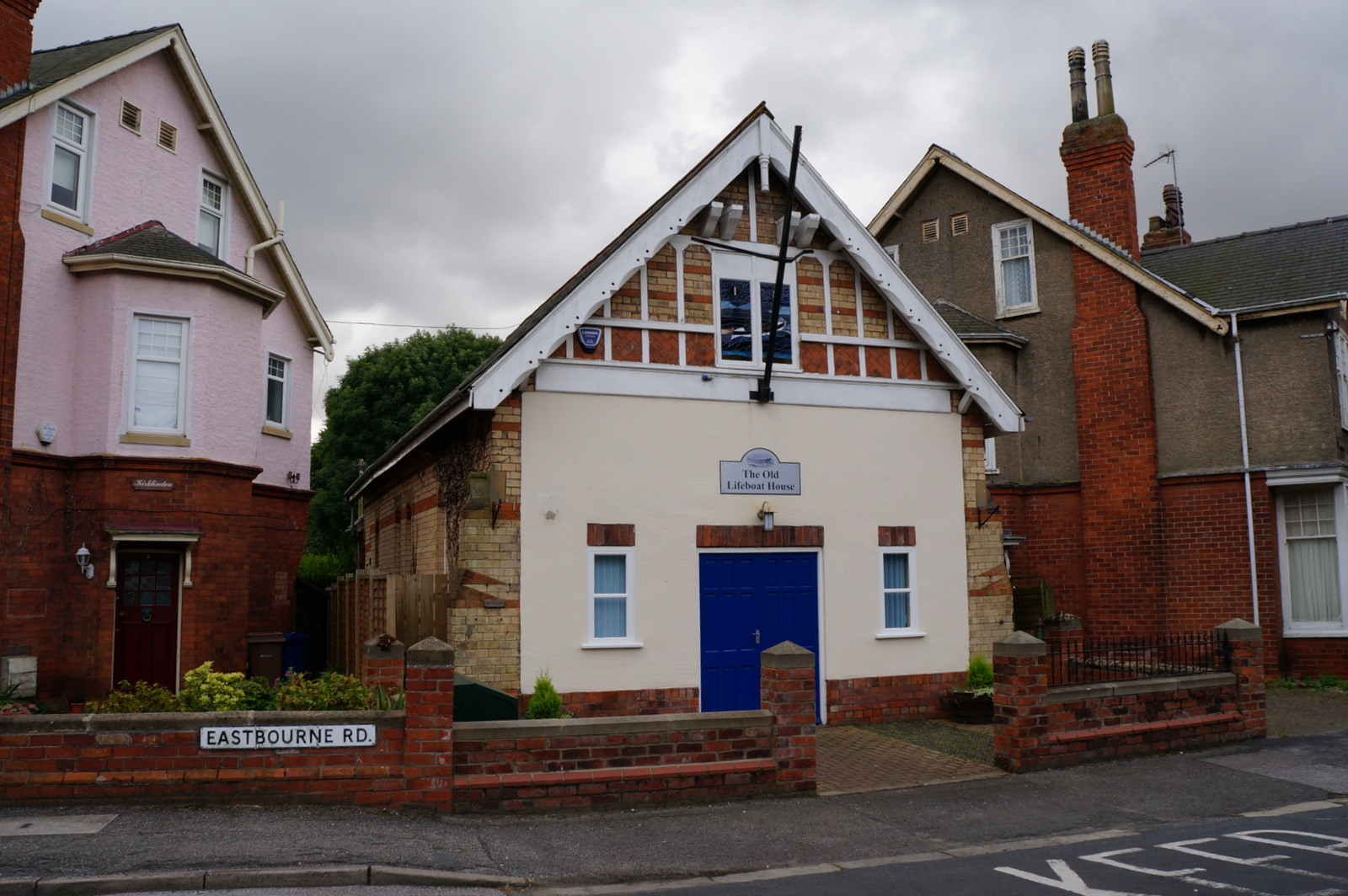
- Hornsea 1878 Lifeboat House

- Hornsea , East Riding of Yorkshire

General information
- Status: Closed
- Type: RNLI Lifeboat Station
- Location: The Old Lifeboat House, Burton Road, Hornsea, East Riding of Yorkshire, England
- Coordinates: 53°54′41.6″N 0°09′57.8″W
- Opened: 1852–1924

Website
- Hornsea Inshore Rescue

Hornsea RNLI Lifeboat Station was located at the junction of Burton Road and Eastbourne Road, in Hornsea, a seaside town approximately 12 miles (19 km) north-east of Hull, on the coast of the East Riding of Yorkshire.

A lifeboat was first stationed at Hornsea in 1852, by The Shipwrecked Fishermen and Mariners' Royal Benevolent Society (SFMRBS). Management of the station was transferred to the Royal National Lifeboat Institution (RNLI) in 1854.

After operating for 72 years, Hornsea RNLI Lifeboat Station was closed in 1924.

An independent lifeboat station, Hornsea Inshore Rescue, was established at Hornsea in 1994.

== History ==
Following a series of local shipwrecks, a local committee was formed in Hornsea in 1851, with their objective being to establish a lifeboat station. They were donated a reserve lifeboat from Hull Trinity House, but she needed essential work, and also a carriage and boathouse, but despite raising £161, they were still £108 short. Negotiations were then held by chairman John Thorley with The Shipwrecked Fishermen and Mariners' Royal Benevolent Society (SFMRBS), who agreed to take on the management of the station, and paid the £108 debt. A carriage was ordered from Crosskill of Beverley, and a wooden boathouse, with a thatched roof, was constructed near the beach. In June 1852, the station opened, with the boat being named Heroine.

By 1854, the SFMRBS was involved in the management of eight lifeboat stations, Lytham, Rhyl, Portmadoc, Tenby, Llanelli, Teignmouth, Newhaven and Hornsea. On 7 December 1854, an agreement was made between the SFMRBS and the RNLI, where one would concentrate on the welfare of those rescued, whilst the other would be involved in lifeboats, stations and rescues. Management of all eight stations was transferred to the RNLI.

In 1856, Mrs Ann Wood of Eltham offered to donate £150 for a new lifeboat, if she could name the boat. This was gladly accepted, and the gift was appropriated to Hornsea. A new 28-foot Self-righting 'pulling and sailing' (P&S) lifeboat, one with oars and sails, was constructed by Forrestt of Limehouse, and was transported, along with a new carriage and all her equipment, from London to Hull, free of charge, by the General Steam Navigation Company, arriving in March 1857. The lifeboat was named B. Wood.

Neither of the first two lifeboats at Hornsea was ever launched on service. In 1864, a 30-foot lifeboat was placed at Hornsea. The boat was already 5-years old, and had served at Carmarthen Bay Lifeboat Station. On arrival at Hornsea, the boat would be renamed B. Wood.

This lifeboat would be launched on 29 October 1869, but couldn't get close to the casualty vessel, the brig Giuseppina, on passage from Naples to Leith when she was driven ashore and wrecked. Three of the 10 crewmen had been lost, but six were rescued by a fishing boat. John Banyard, Chief Officer, H.M. Coastguard Hornsea, then swam out to the wreck with a line, rescuing the Master. For his efforts, he was awarded the RNLI Silver Medal.

The full-rigged ship Martha of Norway was driven ashore on 7 February 1871. 15 crewmen were rescued by the Hornsea lifeboat. A few days later, whilst salvage work continued on the vessel, another storm picked up, becoming the Great Gale of 1871, and 13 men were again rescued from the Martha by the Hornsea lifeboat.

One of the more remarkable fundraising efforts for the RNLI was not made anywhere near the coast, but in Settle, North Yorkshire, mostly due to the efforts of Mr. Christopher Brown, of Stainforth, North Yorkshire. A lifeboat had already been provided from the Settle fund for Penmon on Anglesey, where a life boat (and two subsequent lifeboats), would be named Christopher Brown. The fund would now support the purchase of a boat for Hornsea, a 32-foot self-righting (P&S) lifeboat, built by Woolfe of Shadwell, costing £286-15s-0d, and a launching carriage, costing a further £112-8s-0d. The boat was first taken to Settle, where it was named Ellen and Margaret of Settle. Later, the lifeboat was transported by rail to Hornsea, where on the 29 May 1875, the boat was launched in front of a large crowd of supporters, who had taken special trains from Settle to Hornsea. The next three lifeboats at Hornsea would be provided from the Settle fund, and all bear the name Ellen and Margaret of Settle

In 1877, the boathouse was found to be in a state of very poor repair, and in 1878, the freehold of a site was obtained for a new boathouse for £80, within the expanding town of Hornsea. J. Reynard constructed a boathouse a little way into the town, at the junction of Burton Road and Eastbourne Road, for a cost of £325-18s-0d.

By 1910, operating the Hornsea lifeboat was getting difficult. A number of groynes had been placed along the beach to retain the sand, but this made some launches difficult. With the local fishing industry in decline, fewer men were available for the crew. However, with no shortage of available crew in Bridlington, 12 men there were enrolled. In the event of a call, they would be transported by motor car the 17 miles to Hornsea.

In 1919, a motor-powered lifeboat was placed at the Humber Lifeboat Station. With less sailing vessels travelling the coast, a decline in the number of calls, which were already few in number, and sufficient cover provided by the Humber lifeboat, it was decided to close the station. Hornsea Lifeboat Station was closed with immediate effect on 17 January 1924.

The last lifeboat at Hornsea, Ellen & Margaret of Settle (ON 633) was transferred to the relief fleet, serving for another 14 years. The boathouse still exists, and after a period of use by the local council, is now a private residence.

== 1970s onwards ==
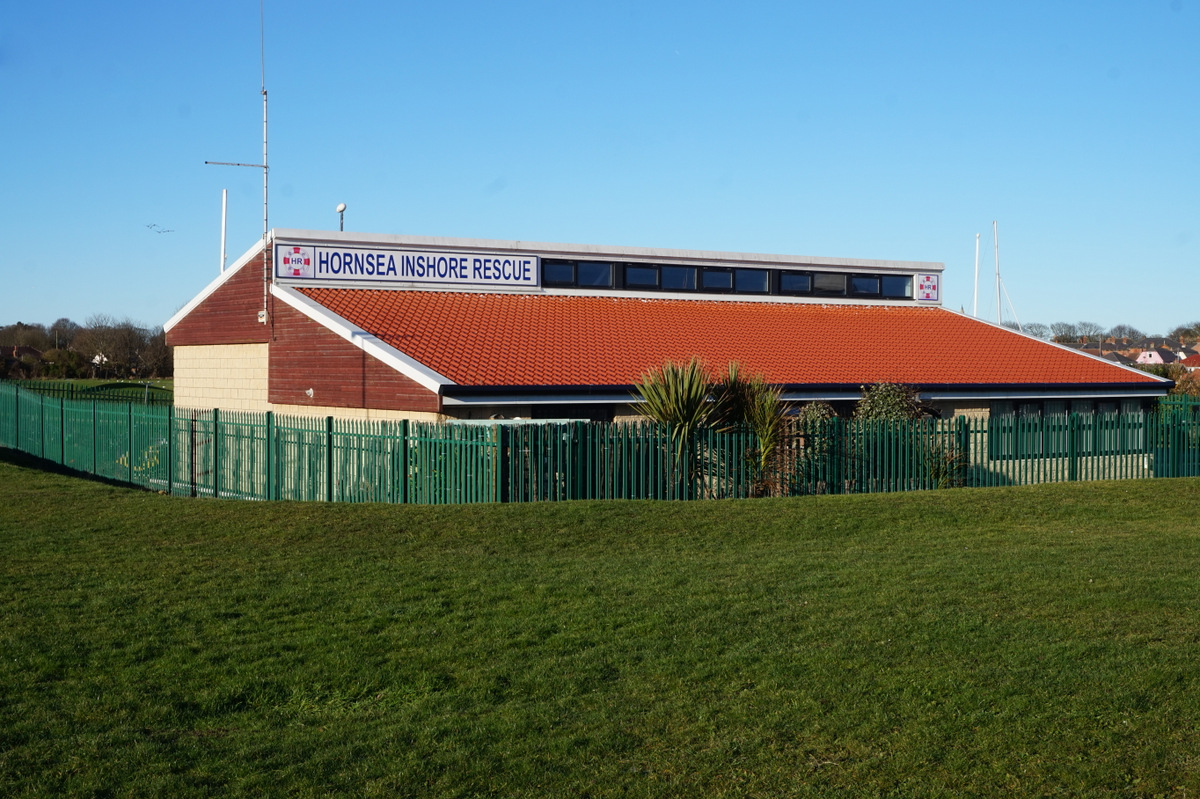
2010 Hornsea Inshore Rescue boathouse

HM Coastguard re-established a watch station at Hornsea in 1975. Whilst they didn't have a 'lifeboat', their rescue craft, initially a Zodiac inflatable, and later an Avon Searider RIB, provided some level of cover if needed.

When Hornsea coastguard station closed again in the early 1990s, this left no rescue provision for the 31 miles of coastline between the RNLI stations of Bridlington and Withernsea, an area regularly enjoyed by locals and holidaymakers. Hornsea Inshore Rescue was established in 1994 with the support of local residents. Hornsea Inshore Rescue operates independently of the RNLI or Government, and is entirely self-funding.

== Station honours ==
The following are awards made at Hornsea.

- RNLI Silver Medal

John Banyard, Chief Officer, H.M. Coastguard – 1870

- The Thanks of the Institution inscribed on Vellum

Rev J. Webb, Honorary Secretary – 1875

== Hornsea RNLI lifeboats ==
=== Pulling and Sailing (P&S) lifeboats ===
ON (Note: ON is the RNLI's Official Number of the boat.)	Name	Built	On station	Class	Comments
Pre-184	Heroine	1839	1852–1857	25-foot 6in Non-self-righting	(Note: 25-foot 6in x 9-foot 3in (8/10-oared) non-self-righting lifeboat, funded by the SFMRBS, built by Thomas Mason of Hull.); Previously unnamed at Humber.
Pre-305	B. Wood	1856	1857–1864	28-foot Peake Self-righting (P&S)	(Note: 28-foot x 6-foot (5/6-oared) Peake-class self-righting (P&S) lifeboat, gift of Mrs A. M. Wood of Eltham, built by Forrestt of Limehouse, London, costing £129.)
Pre-350	B. Wood	1859	1864–1875	30-foot Self-righting (P&S)	(Note: 30-foot x 7-foot 2in (10-oared) self-righting (P&S) lifeboat, gift of Mrs A. M. Wood of Eltham, built by Forrestt of Limehouse, London, costing £148.); Previously at Carmarthen Bay
Pre-595	Ellen & Margaret of Settle	1875	1875–1887	32-foot Prowse Self-righting (P&S)	(Note: 32-foot x 7-foot 6in (10-oared) Prowse-class self-righting (P&S) lifeboat, gift of the Settle LB fund, built by Woolfe of Shadwell, London, costing £287.)
139	Ellen & Margaret of Settle	1887	1887–1905	34-foot Self-righting (P&S)	(Note: 34-foot x 7-foot 6in (10-oared) self-righting (P&S) lifeboat, gift of the Settle LB fund, built by Forrestt of Limehouse, London, costing £406.)
540	Ellen & Margaret of Settle	1904	1905–1912	34-foot Self-righting (P&S)	(Note: 34-foot x 8-foot 6in (10-oared) self-righting (P&S) lifeboat, gift of the Settle LB fund, built by Thames Ironworks, of Blackwall, London, costing £766.)
633	Ellen & Margaret of Settle	1912	1912–1924	35-foot Self-righting (P&S)	(Note: 35-foot x 8-foot 3in (10-oared) self-righting (P&S) lifeboat, gift of the Settle LB fund, built by Thames Ironworks, of Blackwall, London, costing £1,016.)

Pre ON numbers are unofficial numbers used by the Lifeboat Enthusiast Society to reference early lifeboats not included on the official RNLI list.

== See also ==
- List of RNLI stations
- List of former RNLI stations
- Independent lifeboats in Britain and Ireland
- Royal National Lifeboat Institution lifeboats
