= Haverigg Inshore Rescue Team =

Search and rescue service in Cumbria, England

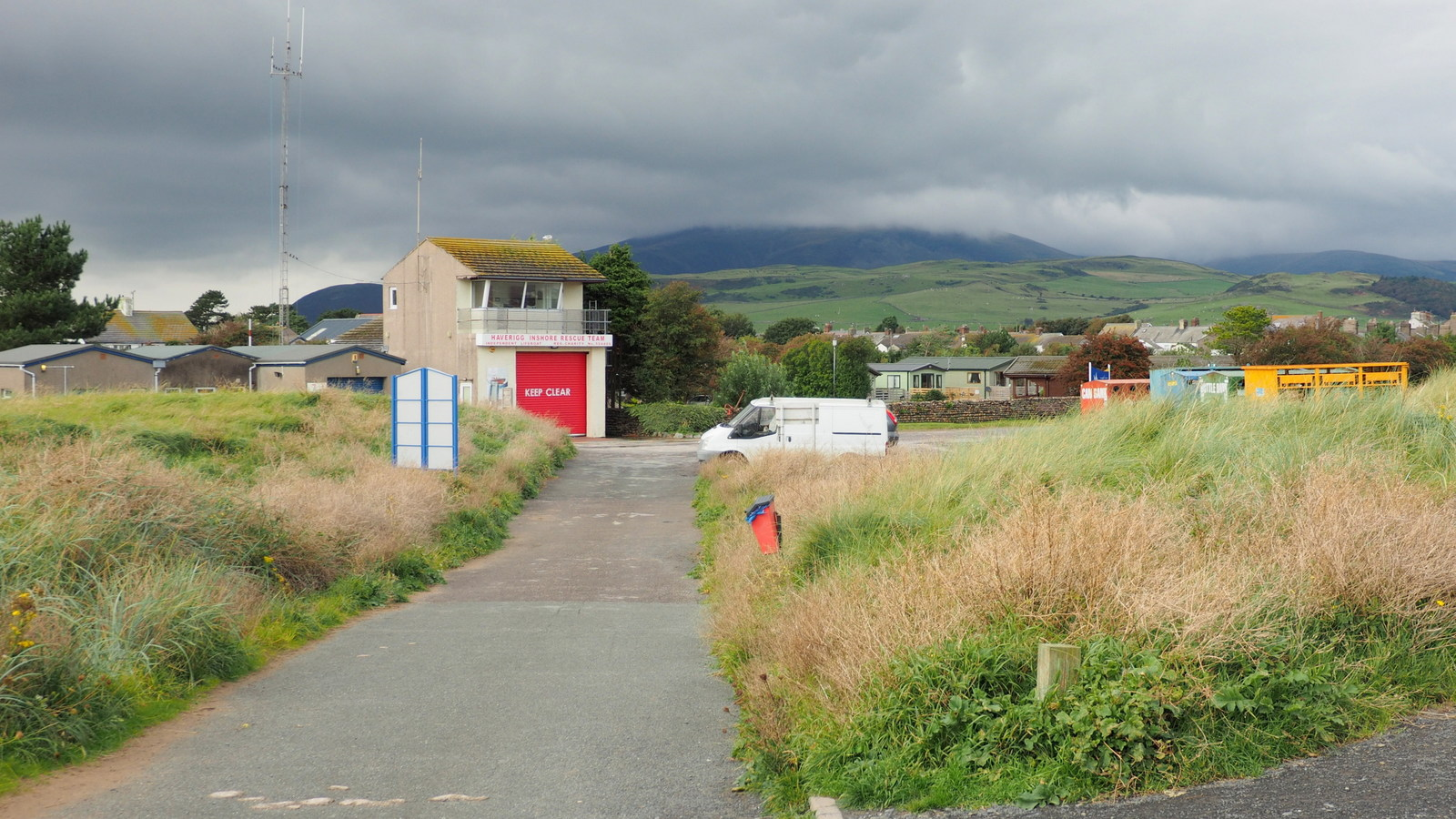
- Haverigg Inshore Rescue

- Location within Cumbria

General information
- Type: Lifeboat Station
- Location: Haverigg Beach, Sea View,, Haverigg, Cumbria, LA18 4GY, United Kingdom
- Coordinates: 54°11′40.9″N 3°17′24.1″W
- Inaugurated: 1973

Website
- Haverigg Inshore Rescue Team

Haverigg Inshore Rescue Team (HIRT) is located at Haverigg Beach on Sea View in Haverigg, a village in Cumberland sitting at the mouth of the Duddon Estuary, 1.5 miles (2.4 km) south-west of Millom, in south-west Cumbria.

This voluntary independent search and rescue (SAR) service was established in 1973, and currently operates a B-class (Atlantic 75) Inshore lifeboat, on station since 2017.

Haverigg Inshore Rescue Team is a registered charity (No. 504409), and is a member of the National Independent Lifeboats Association (NILA).

== History ==
On Thursday 10 May 1973, a father and son were sailing their dinghy off Haverigg, when it capsized, just a few hundred yards off the beach. Mr Clark was rescued, but six-year-old Gary Clark drowned.

The accident was the catalyst for the establishment of a local rescue boat at Haverigg in 1973. A committee was formed to organise fundraising, and investigate equipment options, resulting in the purchase of an Avon S650 Inflatable boat. A trailer was built by local volunteers, and a two-wheel-drive Nuffield tractor was acquired for launching. In all, the total cost including crew kit and equipment was £1600. The boat was stored in a shed at a nearby caravan park.

Plans were finally approved for the construction of a boathouse in 1975, which was completed by volunteers in 1976. In the same year, a matched funding grant was received from The Tourist Board, which assisted with the construction costs, and allowed the purchase of a 10-year-old David Brown tractor to replace the ageing Nuffield unit, which was taking major efforts to keep operational.

In 1985, a 7 m (23 ft) Flatcraft RIB, with a 140-hp outboard engine, replaced Haverigg's second boat, a Gordon Inflatable, and a 4wd modified loader replaced the David Brown tractor, which was no longer suitable for launching the larger boat. This setup remained in operation until 1991, when the team took delivery of a 7 m (23 ft) Osprey Viper Rib with a 236-hp inboard diesel engine, and a more suitable launch vehicle.

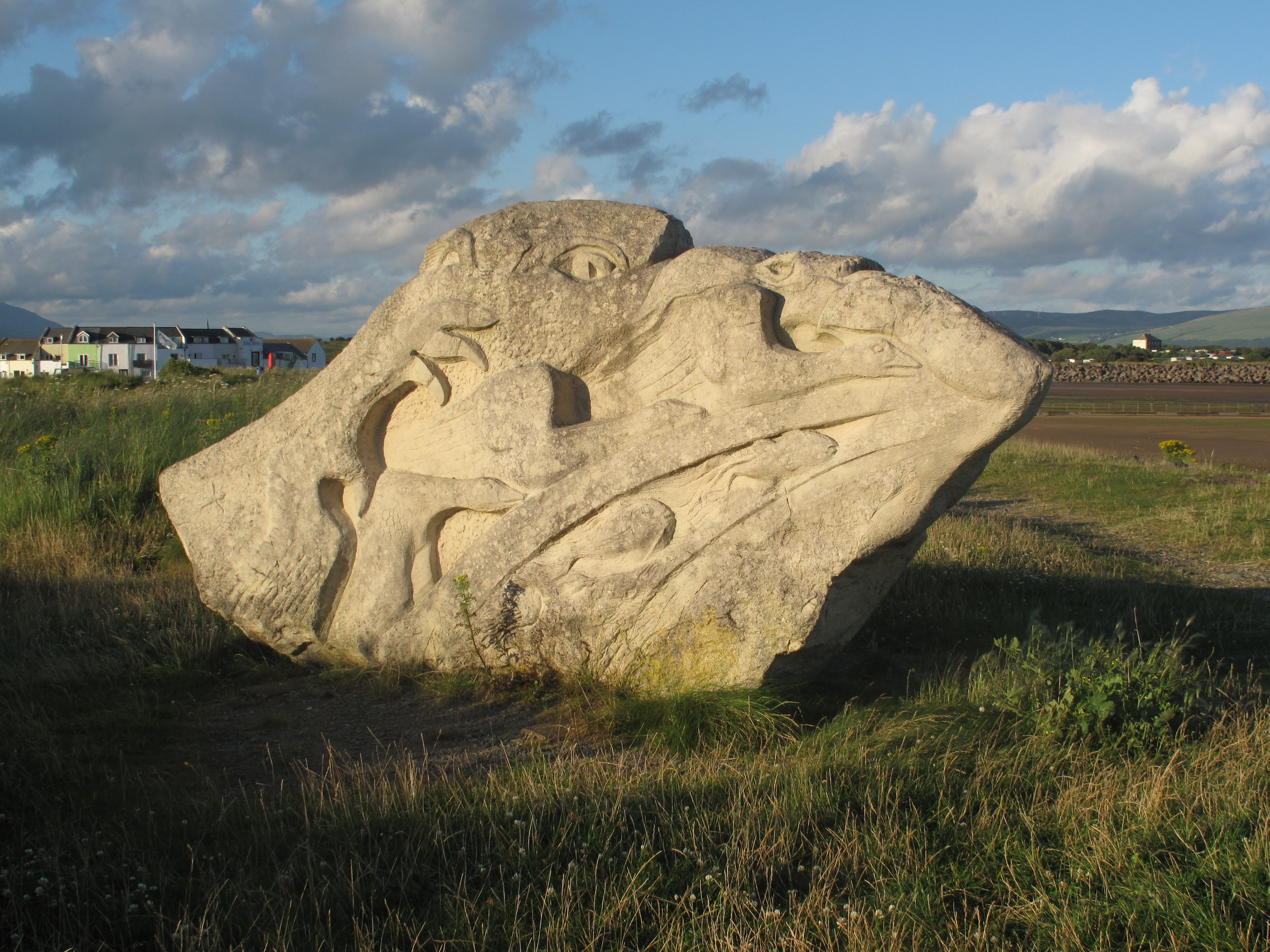
Stone carving Escape to Light at Haverigg

In 2003, a large stone carving was installed near to Haverigg Inshore Rescue station. The carving of the block of magnesium limestone was the last work of Josefina de Vasconcellos (1904–2005). Vasconcellos, of Little Langdale, Cumbria, was a renowned English sculptor of Brazilian and English parents.

The stone, weighing eight tonnes, had first been delivered to Rydal Hall on 24 March 1994, where Vasconcellos, by then aged 90, set about sculpting the work. The piece, completed in 2001, is named Escape to Light, and commemorates the crews of inshore rescue boats across the UK.

2013 would see the arrival of a former RNLI B-class (Atlantic 75) Inshore lifeboat, replacing the Osprey Viper, with trials held on the Duddon Estuary on 19 October 2013. A service of dedication was held the following year in July 2014.

New engines were purchased for the Atlantic 75 in 2021, and a quad bike to assist shore rescues, was acquired in 2022.

Haverigg Inshore Rescue Team, now with 20–25 volunteers, and typically performing 3–4 calls per annum, celebrated the 50th Anniversary of the service in 2023.

On 14 September 2024, thirteen members of the Haverigg Inshore Rescue Team gathered together, to receive the King Charles III Coronation Medal. The presentation was made by Lawrence Ramsay, Commander of the Maritime Rescue Coordination Centre at HM Coastguard Holyhead, and is awarded to civilian emergency service personnel with at least five years service.

== Station honours ==
The following are awards made at Haverigg.

- King Charles III Coronation Medal

Paul Dawson – 2024
Vernon Edmunson – 2024
Martin George – 2024
Hillary Hampson – 2024
Connor Horsefield – 2024
Callum Jackson – 2024
James McIlwraith – 2024

Janet Richards – 2024
Stuart Richards – 2024
Michael Ryce – 2024
Adam Scales – 2024
Lewis Tyson – 2024
Chris Wilson – 2024

== Haverigg lifeboats ==
Name	On Station	Class	Power	Comments
Unnamed	1973–1979	Avon S650 Inflatable	40-hp outboard	Replaced tubes in 1975
Unnamed	1979–1985	Gordon Inflatable	–	
Unnamed	1985–1991	Flatcraft 7 m (23 ft) RIB	140-hp outboard	
Glaxo Smith Kline	1991–2013	Osprey Viper 7 m (23 ft) RIB	236-hp OMC diesel inboard	Full refit in 2003
Haverigg Inshore	2013–2017	Atlantic 75 RIB	2 x 90-hp Honda outboard	Formerly RNLB Amy Constance (B-734).
Haverigg Inshore	2017–	Atlantic 75 RIB	2 x 100-hp Honda outboard	MMSI 235101833. Formerly RNLB BBC Radio Cleveland (B-766) at Hartlepool.

== See also ==
- Independent lifeboats in Britain and Ireland
