= Sligo Bay Lifeboat Station =

RNLI lifeboat station in County Sligo, Ireland

- Sligo Bay Lifeboat Station, County Sligo

- Location within Ireland

General information
- Type: RNLI Lifeboat Station
- Location: Rosses Point, Sligo, County Sligo, F91 CF54, Ireland
- Coordinates: 54°18′17.7″N 8°34′04.9″W
- Opened: 30 May 1998
- Owner: Royal National Lifeboat Institution

Website
- Sligo Bay RNLI Lifeboat Station

Sligo Bay Lifeboat Station is located at Rosses Point, a small village at the head of the Rosses Point Peninsula, at the entrance to Sligo Bay, approximately 7.5 kilometres (4.7 mi) north-west of the town of Sligo in County Sligo, Ireland.

A lifeboat station was established at Rosses Point on 30 May 1998 by the Royal National Lifeboat Institution (RNLI).

The station currently operates the B-class (Atlantic 85) Inshore lifeboat, Sheila & Dennis Tongue (B-888), on station since 2015.

== History ==
On 28 April 1829, James Mulligan, along with two other men, waded out into the surf to rescue two men from the smack Peggy, after the small boat capsized in Sligo Bay, while coming into shore. One man later died. On 5 February 1832, Mullaghmore boatman Michael Duffy, along with five other men, set out in a yawl, and rescued one of two men from the pleasure boat Caroline, which capsized and sank near Sligo.

The Royal National Institution for the Preservation of Life from Shipwreck (RNIPLS), later to become the RNLI in 1854, would award medals for deeds of gallantry at sea, even if no lifeboats were involved. James Mulligan and Michael Duffy were awarded the RNIPLS Silver Medal.

It would be another 166 years before a lifeboat was placed at Sligo Bay.

On 30 May 1998, a lifeboat station was established at Sligo Bay, initially located next to the Sligo Bay Yacht Club at Rosses Point Beach. The D-class (EA16) Inshore lifeboat Storrs (D-427) was placed on station for an evaluation period. It was quickly decided that a larger boat was required for Sligo Bay, and the relief B-class (Atlantic 21) Spix’s Macaw (B-525) arrived on station on 12 March 1999, and was kept on a mooring off Oyster Island.

Re-hulled and named Spix’s Macaw (B-525) in 1992, the lifeboat was named after the Spix's Macaw, a bird native to Brazil, which was threatened with extinction in the early 1990s. The bird was declared extinct in the wild in 1999, but a successful breeding program of birds in captivity, has seen them flourish and be reintroduced to the wild.

Over the next two years, two further Atlantic 21-class lifeboats were placed at Sligo Bay. Construction of a lifeboat station building began, located a little nearer to the village of Rosses Point, providing a boathouse for the lifeboat and launch tractor, along with crew facilities, workshop and retail outlet. It was built in the shadow of Elsinore House, a derelict mansion and landmark.

With the new boathouse now completed, Sligo Bay would receive the new, slightly larger, B-class (Atlantic 75) Inshore lifeboat on 26 February 2002. The boat would be named Elsinore (B-781).

In November 2015, Elsinore was transferred to Lough Derg, and Sligo Bay would receive a new B-class (Atlantic 85). The lifeboat was funded from the legacy of Sheila and Dennis Tongue, both native of Birmingham, but latterly of Exmouth, Devon, where they came to appreciate the work of the RNLI. In all, their legacy would provide four lifeboats. At a naming ceremony on the 16 April 2016, the new lifeboat was formally handed over to the RNLI by Raymond Tongue, nephew and representative of the donors, and the boat was named Sheila & Dennis Tongue (B-888).

== Station honours ==
The following are awards made at Sligo Bay.

- RNIPLS Silver Medal
  James Mulligan – 1829
  Michael Duffy, boatman – 1832

== Sligo Bay lifeboats ==
=== D class lifeboats ===
Op.No. (Note: Op.No. is the RNLI's Operational Number of the boat carried on the hull.)	Name	On station	Class	Comments
D-427	Storrs	1998–1999	D-class (EA16)	

=== B class lifeboats ===
Op.No.	Name	On station	Class	Comments
B-525	Spix's Macaw	1999	B-class (Atlantic 21)	
B-512	U.S.Navy League	1999–2001	B-class (Atlantic 21)	
B-525	Spix's Macaw	2001	B-class (Atlantic 21)	
B-580	Leicester Challenge	2001–2002	B-class (Atlantic 21)	
B-781	Elsinore	2002–2015	B-class (Atlantic 75)	
B-888	Sheila & Dennis Tongue	2015–	B-class (Atlantic 85)	

=== Launch and recovery tractors ===
Op.No.	Reg.No.	Type	On station	Comments
TA50	01-SO-2804	New Holland TN75D	2001–2010	
TA109	10-D-29116	New Holland T5040	2010–	

== See also ==
- List of RNLI stations
- List of former RNLI stations
- Royal National Lifeboat Institution lifeboats

== Sources ==
- Leonard, Richie; Denton, Tony (2026). Lifeboat Enthusiasts Handbook 2026. Lifeboats Enthusiasts' Society.
