= Atlantic 75-class lifeboat =

Second-generation Rigid Inflatable Boat

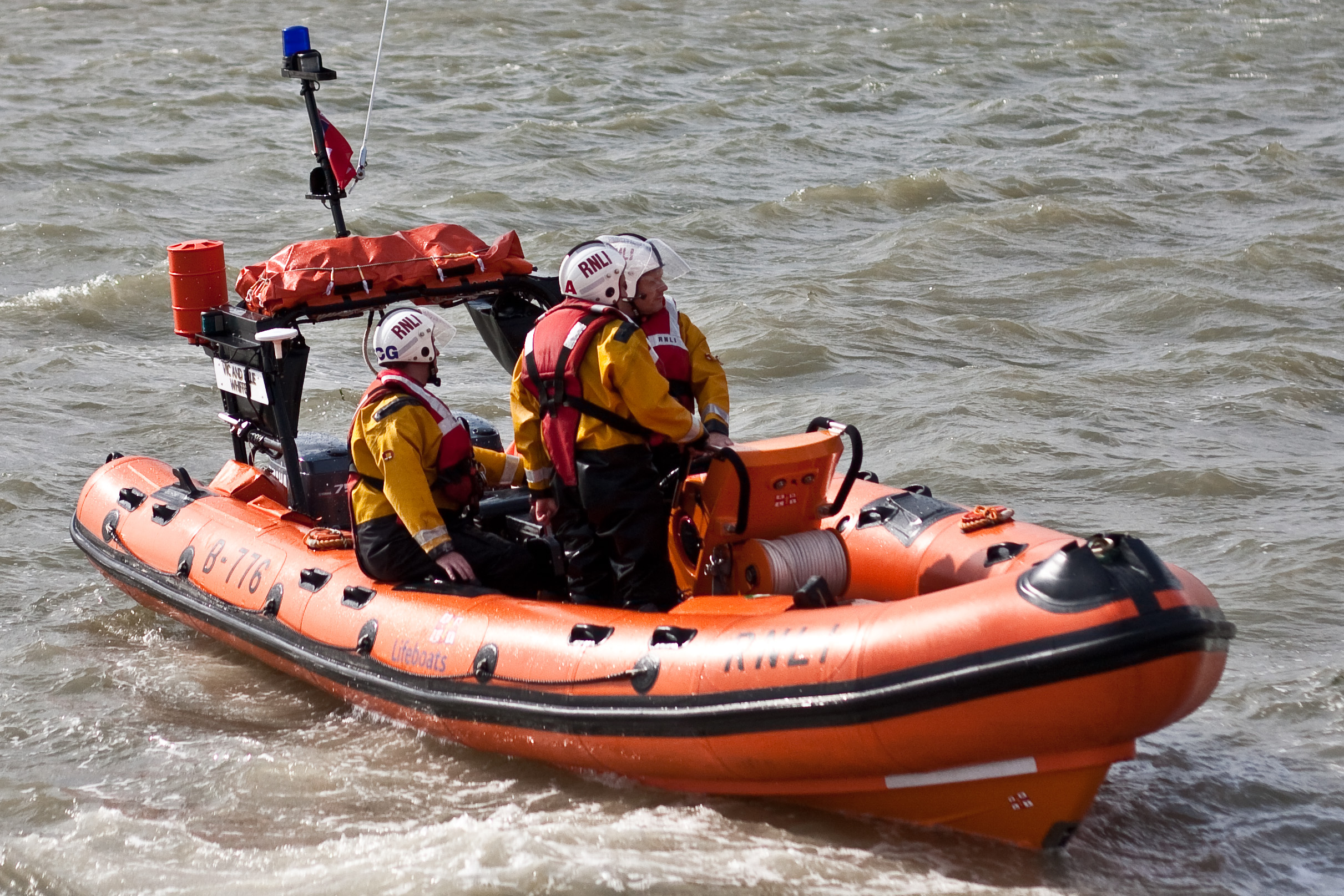
- Atlantic 75 - Southend-on-Sea Lifeboat B-776

Class overview
- Name: Atlantic 75
- Builders: Inshore Lifeboat Centre, Cowes
- Operators: Royal National Lifeboat Institution
- Preceded by: Atlantic 21
- Succeeded by: Atlantic 85
- In service: 1993-2021
- Completed: 97
- Lost: 1
- Retired: 96

General characteristics
- Displacement: 1.6 tonnes
- Length: 7.38 m (24.2 ft)
- Beam: 2.65 m (8.7 ft)
- Draught: 0.41 m (1.3 ft)
- Propulsion: 2 × Evinrude 2-stroke outboard engines, 70 hp (52 kW) or 2 × Yamaha 75 hp (56 kW) engines
- Speed: 32 knots (37 mph; 59 km/h)
- Endurance: 2.5 hours
- Capacity: 23
- Complement: 3

The Atlantic 75 is the second-generation Rigid Inflatable Boat (RIB) in the B-class series of Inshore lifeboats that were operated around the shores of the British Isles and the Channel Islands by the Royal National Lifeboat Institution (RNLI) between 1993 and 2021. This lifeboat was a development of, and gradually replaced, the Atlantic 21-class lifeboat, and was superseded by the Atlantic 85-class lifeboat.

== Description ==
The Atlantic 75 has Hypalon-coated nylon inflatable sponsons. Changing from the grey of the Atlantic 21, all Atlantic 75 sponsons are orange. A conical diaphragm is placed between sections of the sponson, to transfer pressure should damage or leaking occur. The lifeboat has a moulded fibreglass rigid hull, topped with a marine plywood deck, with fuel tanks under the deck. The crew seats are mounted on a fibreglass centre console. A tubular aluminium roll-bar carries communication aerials for GPS satellite navigation and VHF radio, and an inflatable airbag for self-righting. The twin Evinrude 70-hp engines were modified at the RNLI's Inshore Lifeboat Centre at Cowes to prevent water ingress in case of capsize, and allow restart. A tubular mast is provided to mount navigation lights and an emergency blue light.

One of the main improvements made to the Atlantic 75 is the addition of a 200 L (44 imp gal) ballast tank at the front of the boat which enables the boat to launch into larger surf than the Atlantic 21. This tank is filled by a water scoop between the engines; it keeps the bow of the lifeboat weighed down, allowing higher speeds.

All of the following fleet details are referenced to the Lifeboat Enthusiasts' Society Handbook, published annually, with information retrieved directly from RNLI records.

== Atlantic 75 fleet ==
Op. No. (Note: Op. No. is the RNLI's Operational Number of the boat.)	Name	In service	Station	Comments
B-700	Susan Peacock	1992–1996	Trials	Prototype Atlantic 75. Later renamed Vixen, with Poole Harbour Commission
B-700	Susan Peacock	1996–1997	Burnham-on-Crouch	Prototype Atlantic 75. Later renamed Vixen, with Poole Harbour Commission
B-700	Susan Peacock	1997–2003	Relief fleet	Prototype Atlantic 75. Later renamed Vixen, with Poole Harbour Commission
B-700	Susan Peacock	2003	Looe	Prototype Atlantic 75. Later renamed Vixen, with Poole Harbour Commission
B-700	Susan Peacock	2003	Relief fleet	Prototype Atlantic 75. Later renamed Vixen, with Poole Harbour Commission
B-700	Susan Peacock	2003–2004	Burnham-on-Sea	Prototype Atlantic 75. Later renamed Vixen, with Poole Harbour Commission
B-700	Susan Peacock	2004–2005	Relief fleet	Prototype Atlantic 75. Later renamed Vixen, with Poole Harbour Commission
B-700	Susan Peacock	2005	Plymouth	Prototype Atlantic 75. Later renamed Vixen, with Poole Harbour Commission
B-700	Susan Peacock	2006–2009	Training fleet	Prototype Atlantic 75. Later renamed Vixen, with Poole Harbour Commission
B-701	Gordon England	1994–2001	Relief fleet	
B-701	Gordon England	2001–2002	Littlestone-on-Sea	
B-701	Gordon England	2002–2005	Relief fleet	
B-701	Gordon England	2005–2007	Weston-super-Mare	
B-702	Manchester Unity of Oddfellows	1994–2007	Sheringham	First Atlantic 75 to be officially placed on service
B-702	Manchester Unity of Oddfellows	2007–2012	Enniskillin (Lower)	First Atlantic 75 to be officially placed on service
B-703	Jason Logg	1994–2007	Flamborough	Sold 2013
B-703	Jason Logg	2008–2013	Enniskillin (Upper)	Sold 2013
B-704	Enid Mary	1994–2007	Aberystwyth	2021, Sold to the Finnish Lifeboat Institute. Served in Tampere from 2012 to 2022 and moved to Iisalmi in 2023.
B-704	Enid Mary	2007–2009	Relief fleet	2021, Sold to the Finnish Lifeboat Institute. Served in Tampere from 2012 to 2022 and moved to Iisalmi in 2023.
B-704	Enid Mary	2009–2011	Training fleet	2021, Sold to the Finnish Lifeboat Institute. Served in Tampere from 2012 to 2022 and moved to Iisalmi in 2023.
B-705	Vera Skilton	1994–1997	Relief fleet	Sold 2010
B-705	Vera Skilton	1997	Appledore	Sold 2010
B-705	Vera Skilton	1997–2003	Relief fleet	Sold 2010
B-705	Vera Skilton	2003	Kinsale	Sold 2010
B-705	Vera Skilton	2003–2004	Relief fleet	Sold 2010
B-705	Vera Skilton	2004	Sunderland	Sold 2010
B-705	Vera Skilton	2005–2007	Gravesend	Sold 2010
B-705	Vera Skilton	2007–2010	Lough Derg	Sold 2010
B-706	Blue Peter V	1994–2009	Portaferry	Sold 2011
B-706	Unnamed	2009–2011	Training fleet	Sold 2011
B-707	Mercurious	1994–2007	Criccieth	To National Maritime Museum, Falmouth 2015
B-707	Mercurious	2007–2008	Relief fleet	To National Maritime Museum, Falmouth 2015
B-707	Mercurious	2008–2011	Loch Ness	To National Maritime Museum, Falmouth 2015
B-707	Mercurious	2011–2015	Relief fleet	To National Maritime Museum, Falmouth 2015
B-708	Bessie	1994–2007	Minehead	
B-708	Bessie	2007–2008	Relief fleet	
B-708	Bessie	2008–2012	Baltimore	
B-708	Bessie	2012–2013	Relief fleet	
B-708	Spirit of Hornsea	2013–2019	Hornsea Inshore Rescue	
B-709	Lucy Beryl	1995–2001	Relief fleet	2011, Sold to Finnish Lifeboat Institution, Kaskinen Finland
B-709	Lucy Beryl	2001–2002	Kessock	2011, Sold to Finnish Lifeboat Institution, Kaskinen Finland
B-709	Lucy Beryl	2002–2007	Relief fleet	2011, Sold to Finnish Lifeboat Institution, Kaskinen Finland
B-709	Lucy Beryl	2007–2011	Training fleet	2011, Sold to Finnish Lifeboat Institution, Kaskinen Finland
B-710	Friendly Forrester II	1995–2008	Poole	Sold 2013.
B-710	Friendly Forrester II	2008–2009	Relief fleet	Sold 2013.
B-710	Friendly Forrester II	2009–2012	Happisburgh	Sold 2013.
B-710	Friendly Forrester II	2012–2013	Relief fleet	Sold 2013.
B-711	Helene	1995–2009	Bundoran	Sold in Holland 2012.
B-711	Helene	2009–2012	Training fleet	Sold in Holland 2012.
B-712	Betty Battle	1995–2009	Hayling Island	Sold to ICE-SAR 2010, at Eyrarbakki, Iceland.
B-712	Betty Battle	2009–2010	Relief fleet	Sold to ICE-SAR 2010, at Eyrarbakki, Iceland.
B-713	OEM Stone I	1995–2008	Relief fleet	With Dorset Police (P003)
B-713	OEM Stone I	2008	Kilkeel	With Dorset Police (P003)
B-713	OEM Stone I	2008–2009	Relief fleet	With Dorset Police (P003)
B-714	Spirit of Cumbria	1995–2008	Silloth	Sold to KNRM 2010
B-714	Spirit of Cumbria	2008–2009	Relief fleet	Sold to KNRM 2010
B-715	Phyllis	1995–2007	Newquay	Sold to KNRM 2012
B-715	Phyllis	2007–2008	Relief fleet	Sold to KNRM 2012
B-715	Phyllis	2008	Gravesend	Sold to KNRM 2012
B-715	Phyllis	2008–2009	Relief fleet	Sold to KNRM 2012
B-715	Phyllis	2009–2012	Training fleet	Sold to KNRM 2012
B-716	Unnamed	1995–1999	Relief fleet	Capsize Training boat at RNLI College
B-716	Gordon Mote	1999–2017	RNLI College	Capsize Training boat at RNLI College
B-717	Daisy Aitken	1995–2007	Lough Swilly	Sold to ICE-SAR, at Skagaströnd.
B-717	Daisy Aitken	2007	Newquay	Sold to ICE-SAR, at Skagaströnd.
B-717	Daisy Aitken	2007–2009	Relief fleet	Sold to ICE-SAR, at Skagaströnd.
B-717	Daisy Aitken	2009	Training fleet	Sold to ICE-SAR, at Skagaströnd.
B-718	Rotaract I	1995–1996	Relief fleet	Sold to ICE-SAR
B-718	Rotaract I	1996–1998	Blackpool	Sold to ICE-SAR
B-718	Rotaract I	1998–2002	Relief fleet	Sold to ICE-SAR
B-718	Rotaract I	2002	Crosshaven	Sold to ICE-SAR
B-718	Rotaract I	2002–2008	Relief fleet	Sold to ICE-SAR
B-718	Rotaract I	2008–2009	Kirkcudbright	Sold to ICE-SAR
B-718	Rotaract I	2009	Training fleet	Sold to ICE-SAR
B-719	Percy Henry Patmore MBE MM	1995–2009	St Bees	Sold to ICE-SAR
B-719	Percy Henry Patmore MBE MM	2009	Training fleet	Sold to ICE-SAR
B-720	Frederick Robertson	1995–2009	Kinghorn	
B-720	Frederick Robertson	2009–2012	Training fleet	
B-721	Rock Light	1996–2009	New Brighton	Sold to ICE-SAR, at Keflavik
B-721	Rock Light	2009	Relief fleet	Sold to ICE-SAR, at Keflavik
B-722	Beatrice Dorothy	1996–1998	Relief fleet	Dorset Police (P-006) at 2012 Summer Olympics in Weymouth. Last reported with Captain Paul Watson Foundation UK - Marine Conservation Charity
B-722	Beatrice Dorothy	1998	Blackpool	Dorset Police (P-006) at 2012 Summer Olympics in Weymouth. Last reported with Captain Paul Watson Foundation UK - Marine Conservation Charity
B-722	Beatrice Dorothy	1998–2010	Relief fleet	Dorset Police (P-006) at 2012 Summer Olympics in Weymouth. Last reported with Captain Paul Watson Foundation UK - Marine Conservation Charity
B-722	Beatrice Dorothy	2010–2013	Hired to Dorset Police (P-006)	Dorset Police (P-006) at 2012 Summer Olympics in Weymouth. Last reported with Captain Paul Watson Foundation UK - Marine Conservation Charity
B-723	Walters Lifeboat	1996–2009	Relief fleet	
B-723	Walters Lifeboat	2009	Porthcawl	
B-723	Walters Lifeboat	2009-2011	Relief fleet	
B-724	Rotarian Dennis Cullen	1996–2008	Relief fleet	
B-724	Rotarian Dennis Cullen	2008-2010	Training fleet	
B-724	Rotarian Dennis Cullen	2010-2014	Relief fleet	
B-725	Spirit of Penarth	1996–2010	Penarth	
B-725	Spirit of Penarth	2010–2012	Relief fleet	
B-726	Giles	1996–2009	Porthcawl	
B-726	Giles	2009–2013	Hired to Dorset Police (P-004)	
B-727	Commander & Mrs Rodney Wells	1996–2010	Rye Harbour	
B-727	Commander & Mrs Rodney Wells	2010–2011	Relief fleet	
B-728	Dorothy Mary	1996–2010	Red Bay	
B-728	Dorothy Mary	2010–2012	Relief fleet	
B-728	Dorothy Mary	2012-2014	Lough Ree	
B-729	Rose West	1996–2010	Kilrush	
B-729	Rose West	2010–2011	Relief fleet	
B-729	Rose West	2011–2013	Portishead Lifeboat Trust	
B-730	CSMA-Frizell	1996–2010	Portsmouth	
B-730	CSMA-Frizell	2010–2012	Relief fleet	
B-730	CSMA-Frizell	2012	Training fleet	
B-731	Dorothy Selina	1997–2010	Trearddur Bay	Bought by Nisos Yacht Charter as support vessel in the Ionian Islands, Greece
B-731	Dorothy Selina	2010–2011	Relief fleet	Bought by Nisos Yacht Charter as support vessel in the Ionian Islands, Greece
B-731	Dorothy Selina	2011–2014	Burry Port	Bought by Nisos Yacht Charter as support vessel in the Ionian Islands, Greece
B-732	Elizabeth Ann	1997–2007	Relief fleet	
B-732	Elizabeth Ann	2007–2008	Gravesend	
B-732	Elizabeth Ann	2008–2009	Relief fleet	
B-732	Elizabeth Ann	2009–2012	Hired to Dorset Police	
B-733	Brandy Hole	1997–2011	Burnham-on-Crouch	
B-733	Brandy Hole	2011–2012	Relief fleet	
B-733	Brandy Hole	2012–2013	Training fleet	
B-733	Brandy Hole	2013–2015	Portishead Lifeboat Trust	
B-734	Amy Constance	1997–2002	Relief fleet	
B-734	Amy Constance	2002	Gravesend	
B-734	Amy Constance	2002–2004	Chiswick	
B-734	Amy Constance	2004	Gravesend	
B-734	Amy Constance	2004–2005	Chiswick	
B-734	Amy Constance	2005–2008	Relief fleet	
B-734	Amy Constance	2008–2009	Gravesend	
B-734	Amy Constance	2009–2010	Relief fleet	
B-734	Amy Constance	2010–2012	Training fleet	
B-734	Haverigg Rescue	2013–2017	Haverigg Inshore Rescue	
B-735	Donald and Ethel Macrae	1997–2012	Queensferry	Last reported as a private pleasure boat in the Isles of Scilly
B-735	Donald and Ethel Macrae	2012–2014	Training fleet	Last reported as a private pleasure boat in the Isles of Scilly
B-736	Toshiba Wave Warrior	1997–2002	Relief fleet	
B-736	Toshiba Wave Warrior	2002–2004	Gravesend	
B-736	Toshiba Wave Warrior	2004–2007	Relief fleet	
B-736	Toshiba Wave Warrior	2007–2008	Weston-super-Mare	
B-736	Toshiba Wave Warrior	2008	Relief fleet	
B-736	Toshiba Wave Warrior	2008	Poole	
B-736	Toshiba Wave Warrior	2008–2009	Relief fleet	
B-736	Toshiba Wave Warrior	2009–2010	Training fleet	
B-736	Toshiba Wave Warrior	2010–2012	Lough Derg	
B-737	Thelma Glossop	1997–2011	Brighton	
B-737	Thelma Glossop	2011–2013	Loch Ness	
B-738	Dochas	1997–2010	Galway	Withdrawn from service as uneconomic repair. Sold as repairable to Private owner in Netherlands.
B-739	Peggy Keith Learmond	1997–2011	Largs	Sold to ICE-SAR, at Húsavík
B-739	Peggy Keith Learmond	2011–2012	Relief fleet	Sold to ICE-SAR, at Húsavík
B-740	Alexander Cattanach	1997–2011	Kyle of Lochalsh	
B-740	Alexander Cattanach	2011–2013	Relief fleet	
B-740	Alexander Cattanach	2013–2014	Stonehaven	
B-741	Pearl of Dorset	1997–2012	Lyme Regis	
B-741	Pearl of Dorset	2012–2014	Relief fleet	
B-742	Douglas Paley	1997–2012	Appledore	
B-742	Douglas Paley	2012	Relief fleet	
B-742	Douglas Paley	2012–2015	Happisburgh	
B-742	Douglas Paley	2015–2016	Relief fleet	
B-743	Alex & Maime Preston	1998–2012	Tighnabruaich	Last reported on service with Red Cross in Biscay, Basque Country
B-743	Alex & Maime Preston	2012–2013	Relief fleet	Last reported on service with Red Cross in Biscay, Basque Country
B-744	Robert George Alexander	1998–2012	Clacton-on-Sea	Now on service with Red Cross in Biscay, Basque Country
B-744	Robert George Alexander	2012–2013	Relief fleet	Now on service with Red Cross in Biscay, Basque Country
B-745	CSMA 75th Anniversary	1998–2012	Newbiggin	
B-745	CSMA 75th Anniversary	2012–2013	Relief fleet	
B-745	CSMA 75th Anniversary	2013–2015	Training fleet	
B-746	Phyl Clare 3	1998–2015	Weymouth	
B-747	Rockabill	1998–2012	Skerries	Last reported on service in Lesbos, Greece with HRT
B-747	Rockabill	2012–2013	Relief fleet	Last reported on service in Lesbos, Greece with HRT
B-747	Rockabill	2013–2015	Lough Derg	Last reported on service in Lesbos, Greece with HRT
B-747	Rockabill	2015–2017	Relief fleet	Last reported on service in Lesbos, Greece with HRT
B-748	Bickerstaffe	1998–2013	Blackpool	
B-748	Bickerstaffe	2013–2014	Relief fleet	
B-748	Bickerstaffe	2014–2016	Training fleet	
B-749	D J S Haverhill	1998–2011	Hunstanton	Sold to ICE-SAR, at Reykjavík
B-750	Leslie Tranmer	1998–2013	Southwold	
B-750	Leslie Tranmer	2013–2015	Relief fleet	
B-750	Leslie Tranmer	2015–2017	Training fleet	
B-751	Benjamin Dowing Fairbridge	1999–2013	Clifden	
B-751	Benjamin Dowing Fairbridge	2013–2015	Enniskillin (Upper)	
B-752	Tanni Grey	1999–2013	Cardigan	
B-752	Tanni Grey	2013–2014	Relief fleet	
B-753	City of Bradford V	1999–2001	Relief fleet	Last reported on service in Lesbos, Greece, with HRT
B-753	City of Bradford V	2001–2002	Penlee	Last reported on service in Lesbos, Greece, with HRT
B-753	City of Bradford V	2002–2009	Relief fleet	Last reported on service in Lesbos, Greece, with HRT
B-753	City of Bradford V	2009	Aberystwyth	Last reported on service in Lesbos, Greece, with HRT
B-753	City of Bradford V	2009–2012	Relief fleet	Last reported on service in Lesbos, Greece, with HRT
B-753	City of Bradford V	2012–2013	Baltimore	Last reported on service in Lesbos, Greece, with HRT
B-753	City of Bradford V	2013–2014	Helvick Head	Last reported on service in Lesbos, Greece, with HRT
B-753	City of Bradford V	2014–2016	Relief fleet	Last reported on service in Lesbos, Greece, with HRT
B-754	Pride of Sherwood	1999–2000	Relief fleet	
B-754	Pride of Sherwood	2000–2001	St Catherine	
B-754	Pride of Sherwood	2001	Relief fleet	
B-754	Pride of Sherwood	2001–2002	Mablethorpe	
B-754	Pride of Sherwood	2002–2012	Relief fleet	
B-754	Pride of Sherwood	2012–2013	Skerries	
B-754	Pride of Sherwood	2013–2016	Relief fleet	
B-755	London's Anniversary 175	1999–2003	Relief fleet	
B-755	London's Anniversary 175	2003	Salcombe	
B-755	London's Anniversary 175	2003–2012	Relief fleet	
B-755	London's Anniversary 175	2012–2013	Lough Derg	
B-755	London's Anniversary 175	2013–2014	Relief fleet	
B-755	London's Anniversary 175	2014–2015	Humber (BB)	
B-755	London's Anniversary 175	2015–2016	Southend-on-Sea	
B-755	London's Anniversary 175	2016	Relief fleet	
B-756	Eve Pank	1999–2005	Relief fleet	Sold to the Finnish Lifeboat Institution, SMPS, last reported at Naantali as PV Reka, callsign VLS4984.
B-756	Eve Pank	2005–2007	St Helier	Sold to the Finnish Lifeboat Institution, SMPS, last reported at Naantali as PV Reka, callsign VLS4984.
B-756	Eve Pank	2007–2019	Falmouth	Sold to the Finnish Lifeboat Institution, SMPS, last reported at Naantali as PV Reka, callsign VLS4984.
B-757	Miss Miriam and Miss Nellie Garbutt	1999–2010	Relief fleet	
B-757	Miss Miriam and Miss Nellie Garbutt	2010–2011	Galway	
B-757	Miss Miriam and Miss Nellie Garbutt	2011–2015	Relief fleet	
B-758	Sandwell Lifeline	1999–2016	Aberdovey	
B-758	Sandwell Lifeline	2016–2017	Relief fleet	
B-759	Spirit of Clovelly	1999–2014	Clovelly	
B-759	Spirit of Clovelly	2014–2015	Relief fleet	
B-759	Spirit of Clovelly	2015	Portishead	
B-759	Spirit of Clovelly	2015–2018	Relief fleet	
B-760	Alice and Charles	1999–2013	Helvick Head	
B-760	Alice and Charles	2013–2016	Baltimore	
B-760	Alice and Charles	2016–2017	Relief fleet	
B-761	Dignity	2000–2014	West Mersea	
B-762	Jack & Joyce Burcombe	2000–2004	Relief fleet	
B-762	Jack & Joyce Burcombe	2004–2007	Sunderland	
B-762	Jack & Joyce Burcombe	2007–2014	Relief fleet	
B-762	Jack & Joyce Burcombe	2014–2017	Stonehaven	
B-762	Sea Weaver	2021–	Hemsby Lifeboat	
B-763	Colin James Daniel	2000–2013	Atlantic College	
B-763	Colin James Daniel	2013–2018	Loch Ness	
B-764	Oxford Town & Gown	2000–2014	Whitstable	
B-764	Oxford Town & Gown	2014–2015	Relief fleet	
B-765	Bob Turnbull	2000–2014	Ramsgate	
B-766	BBC Radio Cleveland	2000–2015	Hartlepool	
B-766	BBC Radio Cleveland	2015–2017	Relief fleet	
B-766	Haverigg Inshore	2017–	Haverigg Inshore Rescue	
B-767	Maritime Nation	2000–2002	Relief fleet	Sold to ICE-SAR, at Suðureyri
B-767	Maritime Nation	2002	Chiswick	Sold to ICE-SAR, at Suðureyri
B-767	Maritime Nation	2002–2014	Relief fleet	Sold to ICE-SAR, at Suðureyri
B-767	Maritime Nation	2014–2017	Union Hall (Eval.)	Sold to ICE-SAR, at Suðureyri
B-768	Blue Peter II	2000–2010	Beaumaris	
B-768	Blue Peter II	2010	Relief fleet	
B-768	Blue Peter II	2010–2011	Burry Port	
B-769	Coventry & Warwickshire	2001–2005	Weston-super-Mare	Last reported with Falkland Islands Fire and Rescue Service, February 2022
B-769	Coventry & Warwickshire	2005–2006	Plymouth	Last reported with Falkland Islands Fire and Rescue Service, February 2022
B-769	Coventry & Warwickshire	2006–2008	Relief fleet	Last reported with Falkland Islands Fire and Rescue Service, February 2022
B-769	Coventry & Warwickshire	2008–2018	Weston-super-Mare	Last reported with Falkland Islands Fire and Rescue Service, February 2022
B-770	The Boys Brigade	2001–2014	Arran (Lamlash)	
B-770	The Boys Brigade	2014–2015	Relief fleet	
B-770	The Boys Brigade	2015	St Abbs	
B-770	The Boys Brigade	2015–2017	Relief fleet	
B-770	The Boys Brigade	2017–2018	Training fleet	
B-771	The Moray Dolphin	2002–2014	Kessock	
B-771	The Moray Dolphin	2014–2016	Relief fleet	
B-772	The Eric Rowse	2001–2010	St Catherine	Now with Toila SAR
B-772	The Eric Rowse	2010–2014	Relief fleet	Now with Toila SAR
B-772	The Eric Rowse	2014–2019	Lough Ree	Now with Toila SAR
B-773	Duckhams 2001	2001–2015	Relief fleet	
B-773	Duckhams 2001	2015–2017	Enniskillen (upper)	
B-773	Spirit of Hornsea	2019–2024	Hornsea Inshore Rescue	
B-774	Braemar	2001–2014	Relief fleet	
B-774	Braemar	2014	Stonehaven	
B-774	Braemar	2014–2015	Relief fleet	
B-774	Braemar	2015–2021	Weymouth	
B-775	Millennium Forrester	2001–2004	Relief fleet	
B-775	Millennium Forrester	2004–2018	Plymouth	
B-775	Millennium Forrester	2018	Dart (Eval.)	
B-776	Vic and Billie Whiffen	2001–2015	Southend-on-Sea	
B-776	Vic and Billie Whiffen	2015–2016	Relief fleet	
B-776	Vic and Billie Whiffen	2016–2019	Blyth (Eval.)	
B-777	Leicester Challenge II	2001–2012	Redcar	
B-777	Leicester Challenge II	2012–2014	Relief fleet	
B-777	Leicester Challenge II	2014–2018	Burry Port	
B-778	Joan Mary	2002–2015	Mablethorpe	2021, Sold to the Finnish Lifeboat Institution. Last reported as a training and backup boat in Bågaskär training center.
B-778	Joan Mary	2015–2017	Happisburgh	2021, Sold to the Finnish Lifeboat Institution. Last reported as a training and backup boat in Bågaskär training center.
B-779	Blue Peter I	2002–2016	Littlehampton	
B-779	Blue Peter I	2016–2017	Relief fleet	
B-779	Blue Peter I	2017–2019	Training fleet	
B-780	Patricia Jennings	2002–2016	Youghal	Transferred to Merseyside Fire and Rescue Service
B-780	Patricia Jennings	2016–2018	Baltimore	Transferred to Merseyside Fire and Rescue Service
B-781	Elsinore	2002–2015	Sligo Bay	
B-781	Elsinore	2015–2019	Lough Derg	
B-782	Miss Betty	2002–2016	Crosshaven	
B-782	Miss Betty	2016–2017	Relief fleet	
B-782	Miss Betty	2017–2019	Stonehaven	
B-782	Miss Betty	2019–2020	Relief fleet	
B-783	Dorothy and Katherine Barr II	2002–2015	St Abbs	
B-783	Dorothy and Katherine Barr II	2015–2016	Humber	
BB-783	Dorothy and Katherine Barr II	2016–2023	Boarding Boat (Humber)	
B-784	Victor "Danny" Lovelock	2002–2015	Lymington	
B-784	Victor "Danny" Lovelock	2015–2020	Relief fleet	
B-784	Spirit of the West Wight IV	2020–2024	Freshwater Bay	
B-785	Fred Clarke	2002–2021	Littlestone-on-Sea	Last Atlantic 75 on RNLI Service
B-786	Seahorse IV	2002–2017	Great Yarmouth and Gorleston	Written off
B-787	Paul Alexander	2002–2016	Penlee	
B-787	Paul Alexander	2016–2018	Relief fleet	
B-787	Paul Alexander	2018–2020	Weston-super-Mare	
B-788	Pride of Leicester	2002–2016	Staithes and Runswick	
B-788	Pride of Leicester	2016–2017	Relief fleet	
B-788	Pride of Leicester	2017–2021	Great Yarmouth and Gorleston	
B-789	Sure and Steadfast	2003–2018	Harwich	
B-789	Sure and Steadfast	2018–2019	Relief Fleet	
B-789	Sure and Steadfast	2019–2021	Blyth	
B-790	Margaret Bench of Solihull	2002–2015	Abersoch	2021, Sold to the Finnish Lifeboat Institution.
B-790	Margaret Bench of Solihull	2015–2017	Relief fleet	2021, Sold to the Finnish Lifeboat Institution.
B-790	Margaret Bench of Solihull	2017–2021	Union Hall	2021, Sold to the Finnish Lifeboat Institution.
B-791	Gladys Winifred Tiffney	2002–2017	Helensburgh	Transferred to Merseyside Fire and Rescue Service
B-792	Joseph and Mary Hiley	2002–2008	Relief fleet	
B-792	Joseph and Mary Hiley	2008–2012	Training fleet	
B-792	Joseph and Mary Hiley	2012–2018	Enniskillen (Lower)	
B-793	Alan and Margaret	2003–2016	Looe	
B-793	Alan and Margaret	2016–2018	Relief fleet	
B-793	Alan and Margaret	2018–2019	Burry Port	
B-794	Joan Bate	2003–2018	Salcombe	
B-794	Joan Bate	2018-2019	Dart (Eval.)	
B-794	Joan Bate	2020-2021	Weston-super-Mare	
B-795	Staines Whitfield	2004–2018	Burnham-on-Sea	
B-795	Staines Whitfield	2018-2019	Relief fleet	
B-795	Staines Whitfield	2019-2020	Dart	
B-796	Miss Sally Anne (Baggy)	2003–2018	Kinsale	
B-796	Miss Sally Anne (Baggy)	2018-2019	Relief Fleet	
B-796	Miss Sally Anne (Baggy)	2019	Blyth	
