= Baltimore Lifeboat Station =

RNLI lifeboat station in County Cork, Ireland

- Baltimore Lifeboat Station in 2026

- Location within Ireland

General information
- Type: RNLI Lifeboat Station
- Location: Baltimore Lifeboat Station,, Bull Point, Baltimore, County Cork, Ireland
- Coordinates: 51°29′16.0″N 09°22′19.0″W
- Opened: 1919
- Owner: Royal National Lifeboat Institution

Website
- Baltimore RNLI Lifeboat Station

Baltimore Lifeboat Station is located at Bull Point, near Baltimore, a town approximately 85 km (53 mi) south west of Cork, on the south-west tip of County Cork, on the south coast of Ireland.

A lifeboat station was established at Baltimore by the Royal National Lifeboat Institution (RNLI) in 1919.

The station currently operates a Tamar-class All-weather lifeboat, 16-22 Alan Massey (ON 1302), on station since 2012, and a B-class (Atlantic 85) Inshore lifeboat, Rita Daphne Smyth (B-910), on station since 2018.

== History ==
Having considered the report of the deputy Chief Inspector of Lifeboats, following his visit to the south-west coast of Ireland, a meeting of the RNLI committee of management on Thursday 10 April 1913 resolved to establish a motor-lifeboat station at Baltimore.

A local branch of the RNLI was established at Baltimore, with the Venerable Archdeacon John Richard Hedge Becher, MA appointed Honorary Secretary of Baltimore Lifeboat Station. The lifeboat was due on station in 1916, but by 1917, she still hadn't arrived, due to difficulties encountered with the supply of engines during World War One. However, the lifeboat was to be funded by the United Grand Lodge of Freemasons of England, in commemoration of the safe return from Canada of H.R.H. Prince Arthur, Duke of Connaught and Strathearn, seventh child of Queen Victoria, and was to be named Duke of Connaught (ON 649).

On 29 December 1916, the steamship Alondra ran aground on Kedge Rock. 16 crew got away in one of the vessels lifeboats, but the boat capsized, and all were drowned. With no lifeboat available, Archdeacon Becher brought together a crew, and set out in a local boat. Twice they were unsuccessful in reaching the Alondra, and with failing light, put ashore. The following day, with the rocket apparatus, and the assistance of two Royal Navy Trawlers, 23 crew of the Alondra were rescued. Ever since its founding in 1824, the Royal National Institution for the Preservation of Life from Shipwreck (RNIPLS), later to become the RNLI in 1854, would award medals for deeds of gallantry at sea, even if no lifeboats were involved. Archdeacon John Becher and Lt. Arthur Sanderson, RNR, of H.M. Trawler Indian Empire, were each awarded the RNLI Silver Medal.

Just three days later, four fishermen were each awarded the RNLI Silver Medal, for their efforts to save some of the crew of the steamship Nestorian, on passage from Galveston to Liverpool, when she was wrecked on Cape Clear Island. A further three medals for gallantry were awarded in the area before 1918.

On 17 August 1919, a 45-foot Watson class motor-powered lifeboat, Duke of Connaught (ON 649), costing £6,013, arrived at Baltimore. The following year, with a westerly gale blowing, a service of dedication and official naming ceremony took place on 19 April 1920. The ceremony was led by Baltimore RNLI Honorary Secretary Archdeacon Becher, with music provided by the Brass and Reed Band of the Baltimore Fishery School. When handing over the lifeboat to the care of the Baltimore RNLI branch, Commander Stopford Douglas, RN, explained that "the lifeboat was a non-self-righting Life-boat of the Watson type, 45 feet by 12 feet 6 inches, fitted with a 'Tylor' engine, able to develop 60 B.H.P., and that she could stow away 69 people in comfort and 96 at a pinch".

However, in the intervening years since a lifeboat for Baltimore had been announced, the political landscape between the United Kingdom and Ireland had changed, following the Easter Rising. Whilst no official record can be found, it is thought that naming an Irish lifeboat after a member of the British royal family may have been unacceptable in 1920. Lady Coghill of Castletownsend broke a bottle of champagne over the lifeboat, and named the lifeboat Shamrock (ON 649). A different 45-foot Watson-class lifeboat, funded by the United Grand Lodge of Freemasons of England, was named Duke of Connaught (ON 668), and placed on service at Peterhead in Scotland in 1921.

A masonry lifeboat house and slipway had been constructed at Bull Point, at a cost of £2,765. This was used for all of the station's lifeboats until 2012, being adapted and upgraded over the years for newer lifeboats.

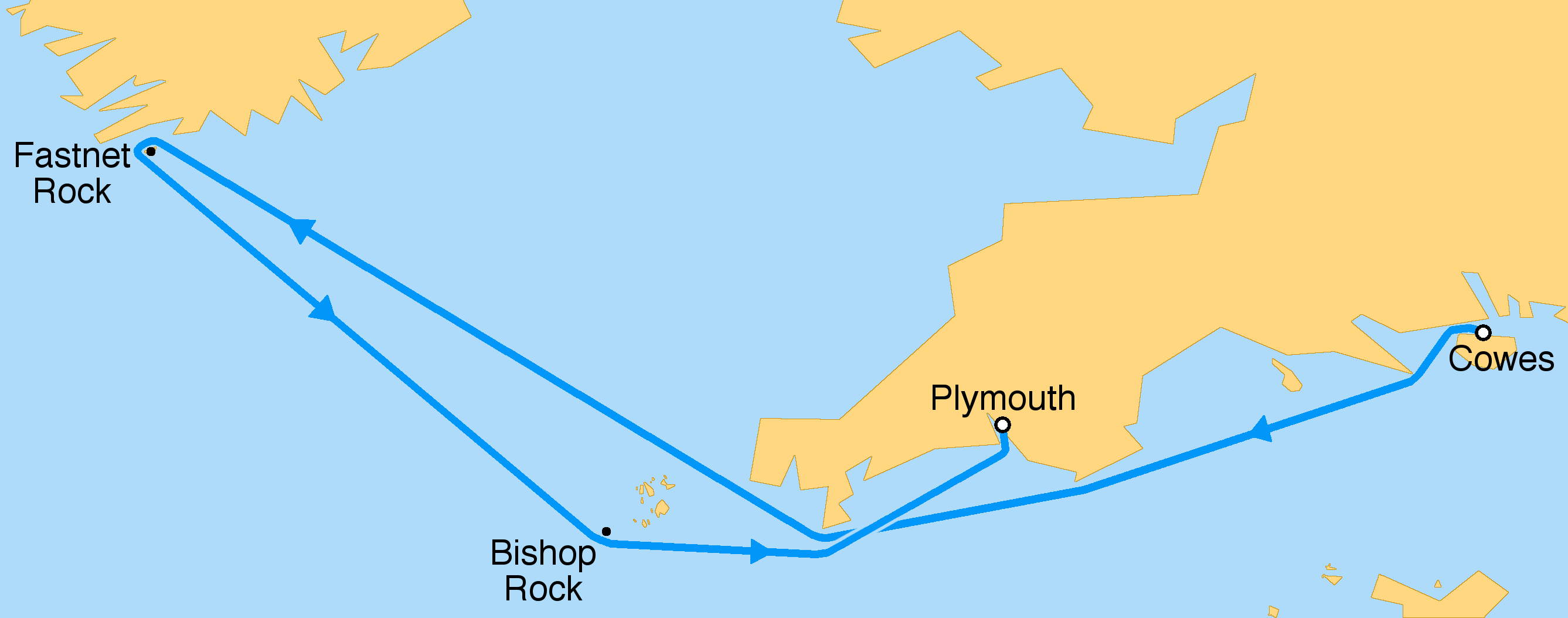
Route of the Fastnet Race

Much has been documented elsewhere about the disastrous 1979 Fastnet Race, the 28th Royal Ocean Racing Club's Fastnet yacht race, usually held every two years since 1925 on a 605-nautical-mile (1,120 km; 696 mi) course from Cowes to the Fastnet Rock, and then to Plymouth, via south of the Isles of Scilly.

The race started on 11 August 1979 in force 4 conditions. But from midday on 13 August, the weather quickly deteriorated.

- 13:55: "Sole, Lundy, Fastnet – south-westerly 4 to 6, increasing 6 or 7 for a time, veering westerly later. Occasional rain or showers. Moderate, locally poor, becoming good later."
- 16:05: "Sole, Fastnet, Shannon – south-westerly gale force 8 imminent."
- 18:30: "Finisterre, Sole, Fastnet – south-westerly gale force 8, increasing severe gale force 9 imminent."
- 23:00: "Fastnet – south-westerly severe gales force 9, increasing storm force 10 imminent."

Baltimore's 47-foot Watson-class lifeboat The Robert was the first to launch, at 22:15 on 13 August. The yacht Regardless was found south-east of Fastnet Rock. The yacht with nine crew was towed into Baltimore at 08:15 on Tuesday morning, the lifeboat having been at sea for 10 hours. The lifeboat crew remained on board on standby, and at 09:05, was tasked by the Marine Rescue Control Centre at Shannon, to the aid of the Marionette. It would be 14:45 before the yacht was found, rudderless, 40 km (25 mi) south west of Galley Head. The vessel with 12 crew was towed back to Baltimore, arriving at 22:30.

In October 1985, the lifeboat rescued the Irish Leader of the Opposition, Charles Haughey, when his yacht sank at the Mizen Head.

In August 2011, the Baltimore lifeboat Hilda Jarret (ON 1137) was involved in the rescue of the yacht Rambler 100, that capsized south of the Fastnet Rock when taking part in the 2011 Fastnet Race. 21 crew, including its skipper, George David, were recovered either from the upturned hull, or from the water.

With the arrival of the new Tamar-class All-weather lifeboat in 2012, the decision was taken not to rebuild the boathouse to take the larger boat. Instead a mooring pen was dredged alongside the boathouse, and the lifeboat is kept afloat. The boathouse has been reconfigured to provide enhanced crew facilities.

== Notable rescues ==
Baltimore lifeboat was called to the fishing vessel Japonica, 13 miles west of Fastnet Rock, at 17:00 on the 30 October 1991. After battling storm Force 10 conditions for over 2 hours, the lifeboat arrived on scene, and after a tow was finally established, the boat was brought to the shelter of Bantry Bay just after 06:00.

Putting into Castletownbere for repairs, the lifeboat was once again tasked to the 60 ft (18 m) sailing boat Atlantic Adventurer south of Fastnet Rock. Setting out at 13.25, into Force 9 conditions, the lifeboat arrived on scene at 16:00, and after setting up a tow, arrived back to Baltimore at 18:50. Coxswain Kieran Cotter was awarded the RNLI Bronze Medal

== Station honours ==
The following are awards made to the crew of Baltimore Lifeboat Station

- RNLI Silver Medal
  The Venerable Archdeacon John Richard Hedge Becher, MA Honorary Secretary - 1917
  Lt. Arthur Lakeland Sanderson, RNR, H.M. Trawler Indian Empire – 1917
  John Daly, Fisherman – 1917
  Tim Daly, Fisherman – 1917
  Michael Cadogan, Fisherman – 1917
  Tim Cadogan, Fisherman – 1917
  John Hart, Master of the Fishing Yawl Mary Annie – 1918
- RNLI Bronze Medal
  Timothy Murphy – 1918
  Jeremiah McCarthy – 1918
  Kieran Cotter, Coxswain – 1992
- The Maud Smith Award 1991
  (for the bravest act of lifesaving during the year by a member of a lifeboat crew)
  Kieran Cotter, Coxswain – 1992
- 'A Framed Letter of Thanks signed by the Chairman of the Institution'
  Vincent O’Driscoll, Assistant Mechanic – 1992
  Ronald Carthy, crew member – 1992
  Michael O’Regan, crew member – 1992
  Aidan Bushe, crew member – 1992
  Cairán Sweeney, crew member – 1992
- A special framed certificate in recognition of their services
  Coxswain and crew – 1979 (Fastnet Race)

== Baltimore lifeboats ==
=== All-weather lifeboats ===
ON (Note: ON is the RNLI's Official Number of the boat.)	Op.No. (Note: Op.No. is the RNLI's Operational Number of the boat carried on the hull.)	Name	Built	On station	Class	Comments
649	–	Duke of Connaught	1919	1919–1920	45-foot Watson	Named Shamrock at the naming ceremony.
649	–	Shamrock	1919	1920–1950	45-foot Watson	Named Shamrock at the naming ceremony.
854	–	Sarah Tilson	1949	1950–1978	46-foot 9in Watson	
955	–	The Robert	1960	1978–1984	47-foot Watson	Previously at Broughty Ferry. Transferred to Lytham St Annes.
1015	48-12	Charles Henry	1968	1984–1987	48-foot 6in Oakley	Previously at Selsey.
949	–	Ethel Mary	1959	1987–1988	52-foot Barnett (Mk.II)	Previously at Ballycotton.
1137	47-024	Hilda Jarrett	1987	1988–2012	Tyne	
1302	16-22	Alan Massey	2011	2012–	Tamar	

More post-service details can be found on the respective lifeboat class pages.

=== Inshore lifeboats ===
==== B class ====
Op.No.	Name	On station	Class	Comments
B-708	Bessie	2008–2012	B-class (Atlantic 75)	
B-753	City of Bradford V	2012–2013	B-class (Atlantic 75)	
B-760	Alice and Charles	2013–2016	B-class (Atlantic 75)	
B-780	Patricia Jennings	2016–2018	B-class (Atlantic 75)	
B-910	Rita Daphne Smyth	2018–	B-class (Atlantic 85)	

== See also ==
- List of RNLI stations
- List of former RNLI stations
- Royal National Lifeboat Institution lifeboats

== Sources ==
- Leonard, Richie; Denton, Tony (2026). Lifeboat Enthusiasts Handbook 2026. Lifeboats Enthusiasts' Society.
