= Crosshaven Lifeboat Station =

RNLI lifeboat station in County Cork, Ireland

- Crosshaven Lifeboat Station in 2026

- Location within Ireland

General information
- Type: RNLI Lifeboat Station
- Location: Hugh Coveney Pier, Pier Road, Crosshaven, County Cork, Ireland
- Coordinates: 51°48′16.3″N 8°17′52.9″W
- Opened: 29 June 2000
- Owner: Royal National Lifeboat Institution

Website
- Crosshaven RNLI Lifeboat Station

Crosshaven Lifeboat Station is located at Hugh Coveney Pier on Pier Road, in Crosshaven, a village in County Cork, at the mouth of the River Owenabue, overlooking lower Cork Harbour, on the south coast of Ireland.

The Inshore lifeboat station at Crosshaven was established in 2000 by the Royal National Lifeboat Institution (RNLI).

The station currently operates the B-class (Atlantic 85) Inshore lifeboat, John and Janet (B-892), on station since 2016.

== History ==
In 1866, the RNLI had established a lifeboat station at Queenstown, today known as Cobh, at the top end of Cork Harbour. The station operated a 'Pulling and Sailing' (P&S) lifeboat, one with oars and sails, up to its closure in 1920.

On 24 December 1878, the brigantine Princess Royal was driven ashore and wrecked at Camden Fort near Crosshaven. Gunner Henry Stevens of the 10th Brigade, Royal Artillery, swam out twice in an attempt to rescue the crew. He was awarded the RNLI Silver Medal.

120 years later, in May 1998, the RNLI was approached by a delegation from the Royal Cork Yacht Club, with a view to a lifeboat once again being placed at Cork Harbour, a natural harbour covering approximately 181 km^{2} (70 sq mi). An RNLI coastal review had already highlighted that the area was in need of improved lifeboat cover. A suitable site at Crosshaven was identified, with sufficient local population to provide a crew. After much hard work and preparation, a station was established, comprising a portakabin and containers, and a B-class (Atlantic 21) Inshore lifeboat from the relief fleet, John Batstone (B-575), originally stationed at Peel in the Isle of Man, arrived on station on 3 April 2000, to start the 12-month evaluation period.

An intense period of training began, with familiarisation trips to Youghal, two groups sent for training at the Inshore Lifeboat Center at Cowes on the Isle of Wight, and the RNLI mobile training unit taken to Crosshaven.

During the training period, one of the more unusual calls the station would receive, was to a dead Orca (Killer Whale) - twice. The orca, which had been living with its family in the harbour for a few weeks, was retrieved to a local boatyard for a postmortem. It was later disposed of at sea, only for it to wash up on a beach three days. The lifeboat crew were once again requested to retrieve it, this time to a more accessible beach, for the local authority to dispose of permanently.

At 18:30 on 29 June 2000, the lifeboat was declared operational. Less than 5 minutes later, the lifeboat was already on service, called to a dinghy in difficulties with three people aboard. They had been on a fundraising event, to raise money for the RNLI.

By the end of July 2001, the lifeboat had been launched 43 times. The station was declared permanent, and construction of a station building began. As well as housing for the lifeboat, which would be launched with the aid of a Schat davit into the harbour off the quay, the station would have an office, training room, and workshop and kit storage. On 27 June 2002, the new permanent B-class (Atlantic 75) lifeboat arrived on station.

At a dual ceremony on 19 October 2002, the 42nd lifeboat station in Ireland was officially declared open. On the same day, the naming ceremony of the new lifeboat took place. The lifeboat was funded by Mr Clayton Love, son of Irish businessman and former RNLI deputy chairman Mr Clayton Love Jnr, who requested it to be named Miss Betty (B-782) after his father's first wife. The naming was carried out by Emma Love and Rachael Cronin, grandchildren of Clayton and Betty.

For his skill and leadership shown during the rescue of a surfer on the evening of 27 October 2005, Helm Aiden O’Connor was accorded 'The Thanks of the Institution inscribed on Vellum' in 2006.

Miss Betty (B-782) was withdrawn to the relief fleet in June 2016. In her place, the station received a brand new larger and more powerful B-class (Atlantic 85). At a naming ceremony on 11 September 2016, the lifeboat was named John and Janet (B-892). Between arriving on station, and the naming ceremony, the lifeboat had been launched 17 times and rescued 34 people.

== Station honours ==
The following are awards made at Crosshaven:

- RNLI Silver Medal
  Henry Stevens, Gunner, 10th Brigade, RA – 1879
- 'The Thanks of the Institution inscribed on Vellum'
  Aiden O’Connor, Helm – 2006

== Crosshaven lifeboats ==
Op.No. (Note: Op.No. is the RNLI's Operational Number of the boat carried on the hull.)	Name	On station	Class	Comments
B-575	John Batstone	2000–2002	B-class (Atlantic 21)	
B-718	Rotaract I	2002	B-class (Atlantic 21)	
B-782	Miss Betty	2002–2016	B-class (Atlantic 75)	
B-892	John and Janet	2016–	B-class (Atlantic 85)	

== See also ==
- List of RNLI stations
- List of former RNLI stations
- Royal National Lifeboat Institution lifeboats

== Sources ==
- Leonard, Richie; Denton, Tony (2026). Lifeboat Enthusiasts Handbook 2026. Lifeboats Enthusiasts' Society.
