= Lough Derg Lifeboat Station =

RNLI lifeboat station in County Tipperary, Ireland

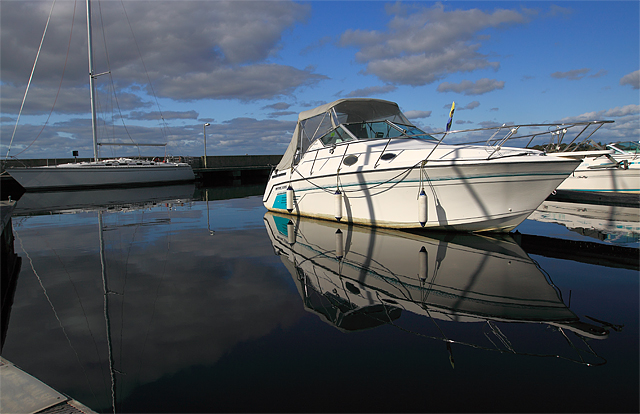
- Lough Derg Harbour, County Tipperary

- Location within Ireland

General information
- Type: RNLI Lifeboat Station
- Location: Lough Derg Yacht Club, Dromineer, County Tipperary, Ireland
- Coordinates: 52°55′36.1″N 8°16′30.9″W
- Opened: 25 May 2004
- Owner: Royal National Lifeboat Institution

Website
- Lough Derg RNLI Lifeboat Station

Lough Derg Lifeboat Station is located at Lough Derg Yacht Club, in Dromineer, a small village on the eastern shore of Lough Derg, the largest lake on the River Shannon, in County Tipperary, Ireland.

A lifeboat station was established on Lough Derg in 2004 by the Royal National Lifeboat Institution (RNLI).

The station currently operates the B-class (Atlantic 85) Inshore lifeboat, Jean Spier (B-911), on station since 2019.

== History ==
In 2003, the Irish Coast Guard took over responsibility for Inland Search and Rescue. A request was made of the RNLI to place a lifeboat on Lough Derg, the largest lake on the River Shannon. At approximately 39 kilometres (24 mi) long and up to 13 kilometres (8.1 mi) wide, it is effectively a small sea, and attracts thousands of leisure craft each year onto its waters.

A site at the Lough Derg Yacht Club at Dromineer was deemed strategically suitable, both physically, and with sufficient local population to provide crew. A group of volunteers were selected, and training was undertaken at the Inshore Lifeboat Centre at Cowes on the Isle of Wight. The relief B-class (Atlantic 21) Inshore lifeboat Clothworker (B-586) was initially sent to the station, and the station was declared operational at 8.45pm on Tuesday 25 May 2004.

On the 18 July 2007, another lifeboat from the relief fleet, the larger B-class (Atlantic 75) Vera Skilton (B-705), was placed at the station. Over the next twelve years, a succession of Atlantic 75-class lifeboats from the relief fleet were placed on station, the last being Elsinore (B-781), previously on service at Sligo Bay.

After 15 years on service, Lough Derg would finally get a 'new' lifeboat assigned to the station. The B-class (Atlantic 85) Jean Spier (B-911) arrived on station on 5 March 2019. The boat was funded by Mr Robert Spier, and named after his late wife. At a naming ceremony on Saturday 11 May, the lifeboat was formally accepted by Paddy McLaughlin, RNLI Irish Council Member, and then handed to the care of Lough Derg RNLI.

The Lough Derg crew would feature in Series 5, Episode 4, of the BBC Television series 'Saving Lives at Sea' in 2020, to rescue a man who had fallen overboard in rough weather, and a night time launch into the fog responding to voices heard.

== Lough Derg lifeboats ==
Op. No. (Note: Op. No. is the RNLI's Operational Number of the boat carried on the hull.)	Name	On Station	Class	Comments
B-586	Clothworker	2004–2007	B-class (Atlantic 21)	
B-705	Vera Skilton	2007–2010	B-class (Atlantic 75)	
B-736	Toshiba Wave Warrior	2010–2012	B-class (Atlantic 75)	
B-755	London's Anniversary 175	2012–2013	B-class (Atlantic 75)	
B-747	Rockabill	2013–2015	B-class (Atlantic 75)	
B-781	Elsinore	2015–2019	B-class (Atlantic 75)	
B-911	Jean Spier	2019–	B-class (Atlantic 85)	

=== Launch and recovery tractors ===
Op. No.	Reg. No.	Type	On Station	Comments
TA52	02-D-86634	New Holland TN55D	2022–	

== See also ==
- List of RNLI stations
- List of former RNLI stations
- Royal National Lifeboat Institution lifeboats
