= Sandycove Island =

Island in County Cork, Ireland

Native name: Cnoc an Rois
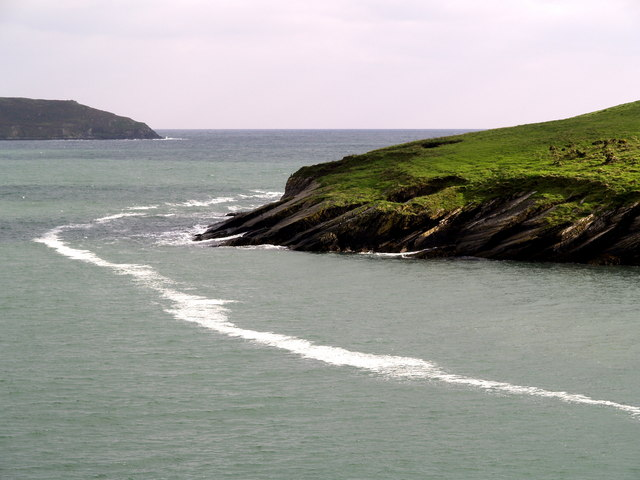
- Sandy Cove Island from the Irish Mainland

- Location within island of Ireland

Geography
- Coordinates: 51°40′34″N 08°31′08″W

Administration
- Ireland
- County: County Cork

Demographics
- Ethnic groups: Irish

Sandycove Island (Cnoc an Rois in Irish) is a small island and townland at the mouth of Ardkilly Creek on the south coast of Ireland, just to the west of the Castlepark peninsula, which forms the western side of the entrance to Kinsale harbour in County Cork.

It is located directly opposite the tiny hamlet of Sandycove (population around 100) and no more than 200 metres (656 ft) off the shore.

The island is uninhabited except for a herd of feral goats which has grazed on the island for generations, an indication that there is probably a reliable source of fresh water on the island.

Over the centuries a number of ships have foundered on the rocks off the island, including the 147-ton brig Eliza which went aground on the island in 1826.

The Sandycove Island Challenge is an open-water swimming race that has been held annually since 1994. The 1,600m course runs from the slipway at Sandycove on the mainland, around Sandycove Island and back to the slipway.
