= Alondra (shipwreck) =

English steamer wrecked off Ireland

Alondra was an English steamer owned by Yeoward Bros. Ltd. out of Liverpool. She sank on 29 December 1916, in the North Atlantic after running aground at Kedge Rock in Baltimore, County Cork, Ireland. Seventeen men of the crew died while the remaining 23 were rescued.

== Construction and ownership ==
In 1899, David J. Dunlop of Port Glasgow, Renfrewshire, Scotland, built Alondra for the London-based Rio Tinto Company. She was launched on 9 July 1899, and was classified as a passenger and cargo steamship. She was built of steel and was about 300 feet (91 meters) long, 40 feet (12 meters) wide, and 20 feet (6.1 meters) deep. She was rigged as a schooner and had two masts. In 1915, Yeoward Bros. Ltd. of Liverpool took possession of the ship and she was their property the day that she ran aground on 29 December 1916.

== Accident and Rescue ==
The cause of the wreck of Alondra is not entirely clear. What is known is that the ship ran aground on 29 December 1916 on Kedge Rock, an island off Baltimore, County Cork, Ireland, with sheer rock cliffs. After Alondra struck Kedge Rock, 16 of her crew were able to get aboard one of the ship's lifeboats, but they drowned before they could reach safety. Another man died on board. Meanwhile, Archdeacon John Richard Hedges Becher, who was serving as the honorary secretary of the Baltimore Royal National Lifeboat Institution (RNLI), set out with a rescue lifeboat. He failed to reach Alondra on the first or second try. When the sun rose, he and his lifeboat crew set out a third time using a rocket apparatus and managed to reach the vessel.

While the lifeboat worked from one position, the crews of Royal Navy trawlers worked from the tops of the cliffs to lift other surviving crew members out of Alondra. In total, 23 men were rescued from the ship. The RNLI awarded Silver Medals for Gallantry to Archdeacon Becher and to Lieutenant Sanderson for assisting with the rescue.

In 1913, the RNLI had established a lifeboat station in Baltimore, which could have been of assistance in rescuing the crew of the Alondra. Unfortunately, World War I delayed the official opening of the base until 1919.

== Depiction in Film ==
In 2013, a professional film crew sponsored by Arts Council England created a film based on the events surrounding the Alondra shipwreck of 1916. The film was made in collaboration with the RNLI and the Baltimore Drama Group, and featured Pat Flaherty, Tadhg Collins, Michael Walsh, Cornie Bohane, Rupert Stutchbury, and Bernie O’Driscoll. The film was included in an RNLI touring exhibition commemorating the organisation's involvement in World War I.

== Dive Site ==
Today, wreck diving is popular in Baltimore at sites such as the Alondra wreck. The ship settled at a depth of 5 to 20 meters (16 to 66 ft) and is located at 51°27′40″N 09°20′44″W.
