= Linda Oubré =

American academic administrator

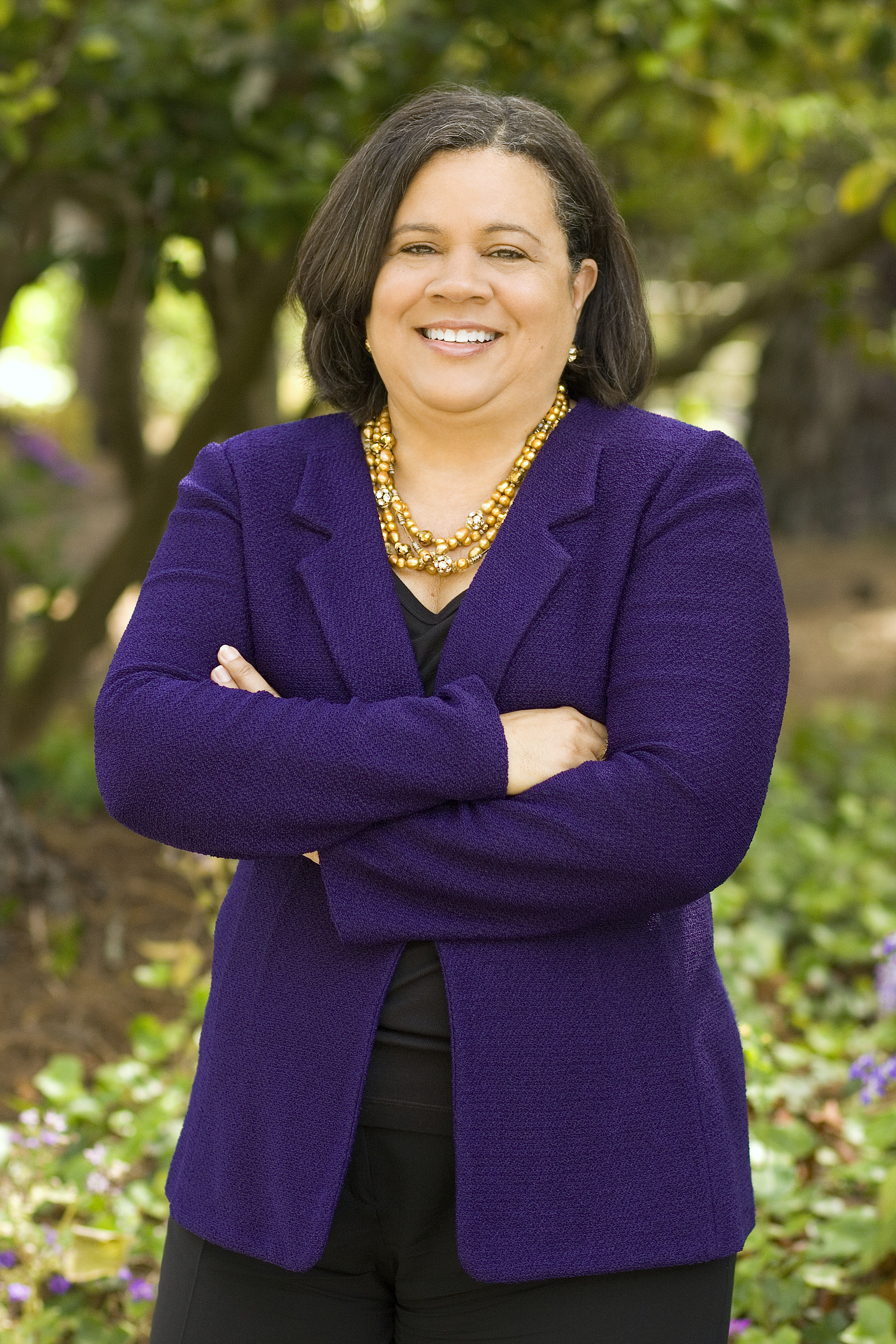

Academic background
- Education: University of Pennsylvania
- Thesis: Seeing What Sticks! Revenue Diversification and New Venturing in the Business Schools of the California State University (2017)

Linda Oubré is an American academic administrator who served as president of Whittier College from 2018 to 2023.

== Early life and education ==
Oubré grew up in Los Angeles and was a first-generation college student whose grandparents did not finish elementary school, but were labor and civil rights activists. She graduated from Hollywood High School, and earned a B.A. in economics from the University of California, Los Angeles in 1980. After college she worked for a commercial bank before earning an MBA from Harvard Business School in 1984, and an Ed.D. in higher education management from the University of Pennsylvania.

== Career ==
After Oubré graduated from Harvard Business School she worked in the admissions department. She was a founder of BriteSmile, and worked with the company from 1998 until 2002, including serving as president of the company when it went public on NASDAQ.

She has worked in multiple companies including Tri Com Ventures, Times Mirror Company, Syncom Capital, and the Walt Disney Company. In 2003, Oubré was an executive in residence at the University of California, Davis, and she returned in 2011 to work in corporate relations, business development, and was the chief diversity officer for the Graduate School of Management.

In 2012, Oubré moved to San Francisco State University where she was the Dean of the College of Business. In 2018, Oubré was named president of Whittier College. She is the first African-American and the third woman to serve as president of the college.

In 2019 she was named to the board of directors for the College Futures Foundation.

On May 12, 2023, Oubré announced her resignation as president of Whittier College, effective June 30, 2023.

== Honors and awards ==
Oubré was named a "Forever influential woman in business" by the San Francisco Business Times in 2014, and received the Trailblazer Award from the San Francisco chapter of the Council of 100 Black Women in 2015.
