= Alondra Oubré =

American medical anthropologist

Alondra Oubré is an American medical anthropologist.

== Early life and education ==
Born in San Francisco and raised in the Bay Area, she resides in Southern California.

Oubré earned her M.A. in anthropology and a Ph.D. in anthropology and medical anthropology from UC Berkeley.

== Career ==
In 1992, she joined Shaman Pharmaceuticals as a staff scientist.

She is the author of Instinct and Revelation, which a reviewer wrote that "Oubré (1997) makes an intriguing case for the evolutionary importance in humans of an evolved capacity for states of transcendental consciousness...."

She also has written on plant drug research, pharmacology, and human biodiversity.

Oubré has advocated for "youth who speak Ebonics to ... take steps to learn and adapt Standard English as their primary tongue."

Her work on violence amongst the Māori in the face of resource scarcity has been critiqued as "not unattractive".

== See also ==
- African-American Vernacular English and social context
