= Wandsworth Riverside Lifeboat Station =

RNLI lifeboat station in West London, on the River Thames

- Wandsworth Riverside Lifeboat Station

- Location within Greater London

General information
- Type: RNLI Lifeboat Station
- Location: 90 Point Pleasant, Wandsworth, London SW18 1PP, United Kingdom
- Coordinates: 51.462222°N 0.199444°W
- Opened: 2026
- Owner: Royal National Lifeboat Institution

Website
- Wandsworth Riverside RNLI Lifeboat Station

Wandsworth Riverside Lifeboat Station is located on the south bank of the River Thames, at Point Pleasant, Wandsworth, next to the Thames Clipper jetty in west London.

It is the newest lifeboat station operated by the Royal National Lifeboat Institution (RNLI), with operations commencing on 22 September 2026, replacing the station which operated at Chiswick from 2002.

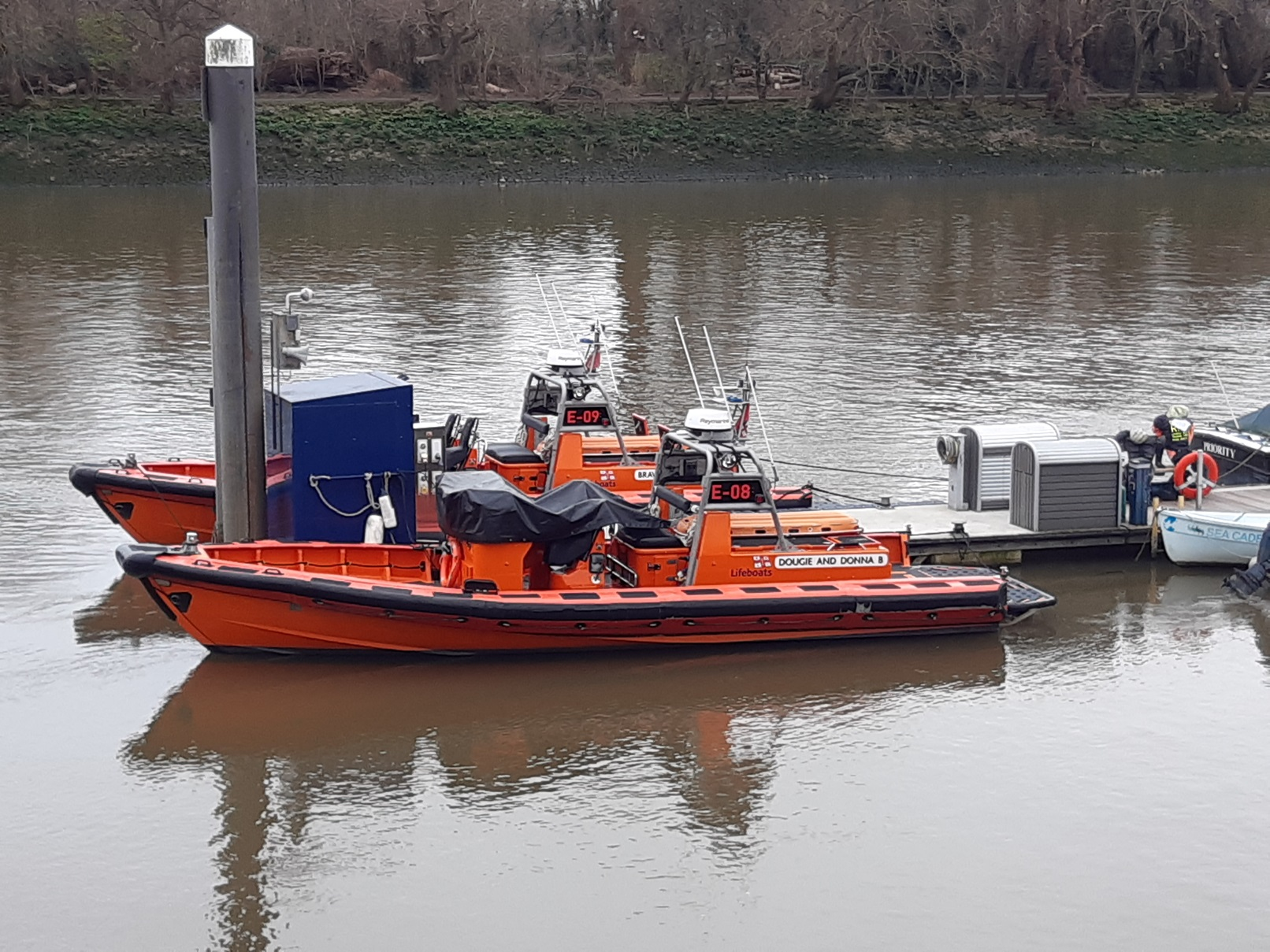
E-class RNLI lifeboats E-08 and E-09

The station will principally operate two E-class lifeboats, Dougie and Donna B (E-08) and Brawn Challenge (E-09), both on service since 2012, but boats may be interchanged with those at Tower lifeboat station if required, to meet service requirements.

== History ==
The inquiry set up after the collision in 1989 between the Marchioness and the dredger Bowbelle, that resulted in the loss of 51 lives, recommended a dedicated search and rescue presence on the River Thames. The government approached the RNLI, who agreed to provide a rescue service that covered the tidal Thames, between Teddington and the sea.

Locations were approved for stations at Teddington, Tower (now located at Victoria Embankment next to Waterloo Bridge), Gravesend, and at Chiswick. All four stations became operational at the beginning of 2002.

Demand for the services of the Thames lifeboats proved to be much higher than originally anticipated. In 2002, their first year of operation, Thames lifeboats were called out over 800 times, accounting for 10% of the total number of call-outs, or "shouts", for the whole of the RNLI nationwide. Within two months of opening, Chiswick became the UK's second busiest lifeboat station, after Tower Lifeboat Station in Central London. Since the service became operational in 2002, Chiswick Lifeboat has attended over 5,000 incidents and rescued over 2,500 people.

Three new E-class lifeboat Mark II lifeboats, E-07, E-08 and E-09, joined the Thames fleet in 2012, and served at both Chiswick and Tower stations. With a new larger E-class lifeboat Mark III lifeboat (E-10) arriving at Tower in 2019, Chiswick became the principal station for Dougie and Donna B (E-08), and Brawn Challenge (E-09).

The station at Chiswick had been shared with the Chiswick Pier Trust. The meeting rooms, kitchen and toilets were all shared spaces, and the 60 volunteers had to take their kit home after every shift, due to insufficient storage facilities. No longer large enough for operational requirements, in 2023, the RNLI acquired the former marketing building in Wandsworth Riverside Quarter, approximately 3.5 miles (5.6 km) downstream from the Chiswick station.

Wandsworth Riverside Lifeboat Station

The majority of funding for the new station was provided from a generous benefactor, with a fundraising appeal launched to raise a further £300,000. Planning permission was granted for change of use, and conversion work began to fit-out the building, with an operational target date of Autumn 2025.

Operations finally commenced from the new station on 22 September 2026. Although still covering the same stretch of the River Thames, one key advantage of the move, based on call-out history, is that the station will be much nearer the majority of incidents usually encountered, which should therefore dramatically reduce response times. The station has ten times the amount of floor area than the previous station, and much improved facilities for crew, many of whom will be on station for several days during each 12-hour shift. The station also has a separate Visitor Centre, which will be able to hosts groups for educational purposes, and has a retail outlet for fundraising.

== Crew ==
The Wandsworth Riverside station will be staffed continuously to provide an immediate response, and is coordinated by the Coastguard. The crew is drawn from both full-time staff, and a pool of about 60 volunteers.

== Wandsworth Riverside lifeboats ==
Op.No. (Note: Op.No. is the RNLI's Operational Number of the boat carried on the hull.)	Name	On station	Class	Comments
E-08	Dougie and Donna B	2026–	E-class (Mk II)	
E-09	Brawn Challenge	2026–	E-class (Mk II)	

== See also ==
- List of RNLI stations
- List of former RNLI stations
- Royal National Lifeboat Institution lifeboats
