= Marine Policing Unit =

Policing Unit of London

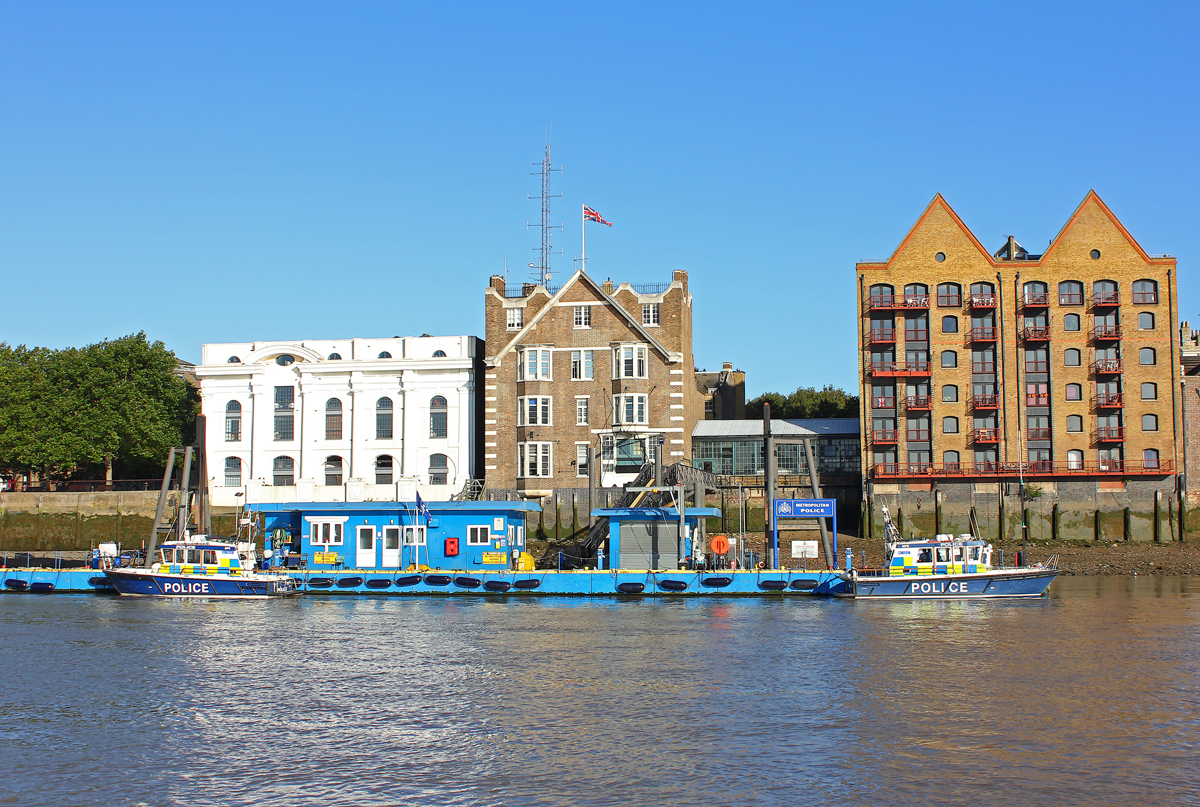
Wapping Police jetty

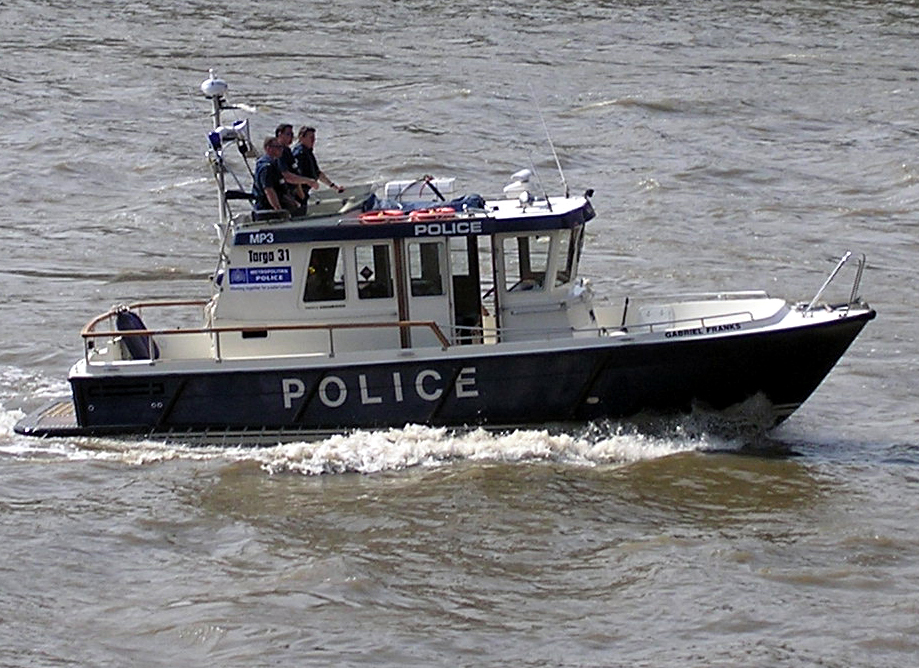
The Gabriel Franks, a Fast Response Targa 31 boat of the Metropolitan Police Marine Policing Unit, named after a lumper employed by the Marine Police killed in 1798, regarded as the first British marine police officer to be killed in the line of duty.

The Marine Policing Unit (MPU) is the waterborne policing unit of London's Metropolitan Police Service, forming part of the Met Taskforce (MO7) within Met Operations. Its 22 vessels are responsible for waterborne policing of the River Thames in Greater London and supporting the rest of the Metropolitan Police and to the City of London Police when dealing with incidents in or around any waterway in London. A specialist underwater and confined-spaces search team carries out searches throughout the Metropolitan Police District. The unit also has 24 officers who are trained in rope access techniques and trained to carry out searches and counter-demonstrator operations at height.

In 1839 the Marine Police Force was merged into the Metropolitan Police as the Thames Division. It held that name until being renamed the Marine Support Unit in 2001 and taking on its present name seven years later. The unit is still headquartered at Wapping, where a former carpenters' workshop also houses the River Police Museum, opened in August 1975 by Deputy Commissioner Colin Woods and now curated by John Joslin and Rob Jeffries, two former officers with the unit.

== Area of responsibility ==
Originally focusing on the Pool of London, since the 19th century it has had responsibility for the 47 miles of the Thames between Hampton Court in the west and Dartford Creek in the east. This includes the stretch of river within the City of London, since the City of London Police does not have its own marine unit. Above Hampton Court, Surrey Police have responsibility for policing but a launch is supplied by the Environment Agency. Below Dartford Creek, responsibility lies with both Essex Police and Kent Police, who have combined forces and formed a joint marine unit, with Kent based at Sheerness and Essex based at Burnham-on-Crouch.

== Ranks ==
Before 1839 the River Police held the ranks of 3rd, 2nd and 1st Inspector due to the special powers invested to Inspectors on the river by legislation regarding the boarding of vessels on the Thames. These ranks were retained when the River Police became Thames Division, uniquely among Metropolitan Police divisions and taking the place of Sergeants or Station Sergeants in the Metropolitan Police's other divisions. 3rd Class Inspectors were ranked and paid as Sergeants in the rest of force, 2nd Class Inspectors as Station Sergeants and 1st Class Inspectors as substantive Inspectors. These ranks were replaced by normal Metropolitan Police ranks in 1903, though for many years after that date Thames Division officers are still ranked on their service sheets using these old Inspector ranks.

== History ==
=== 1839–1945 ===
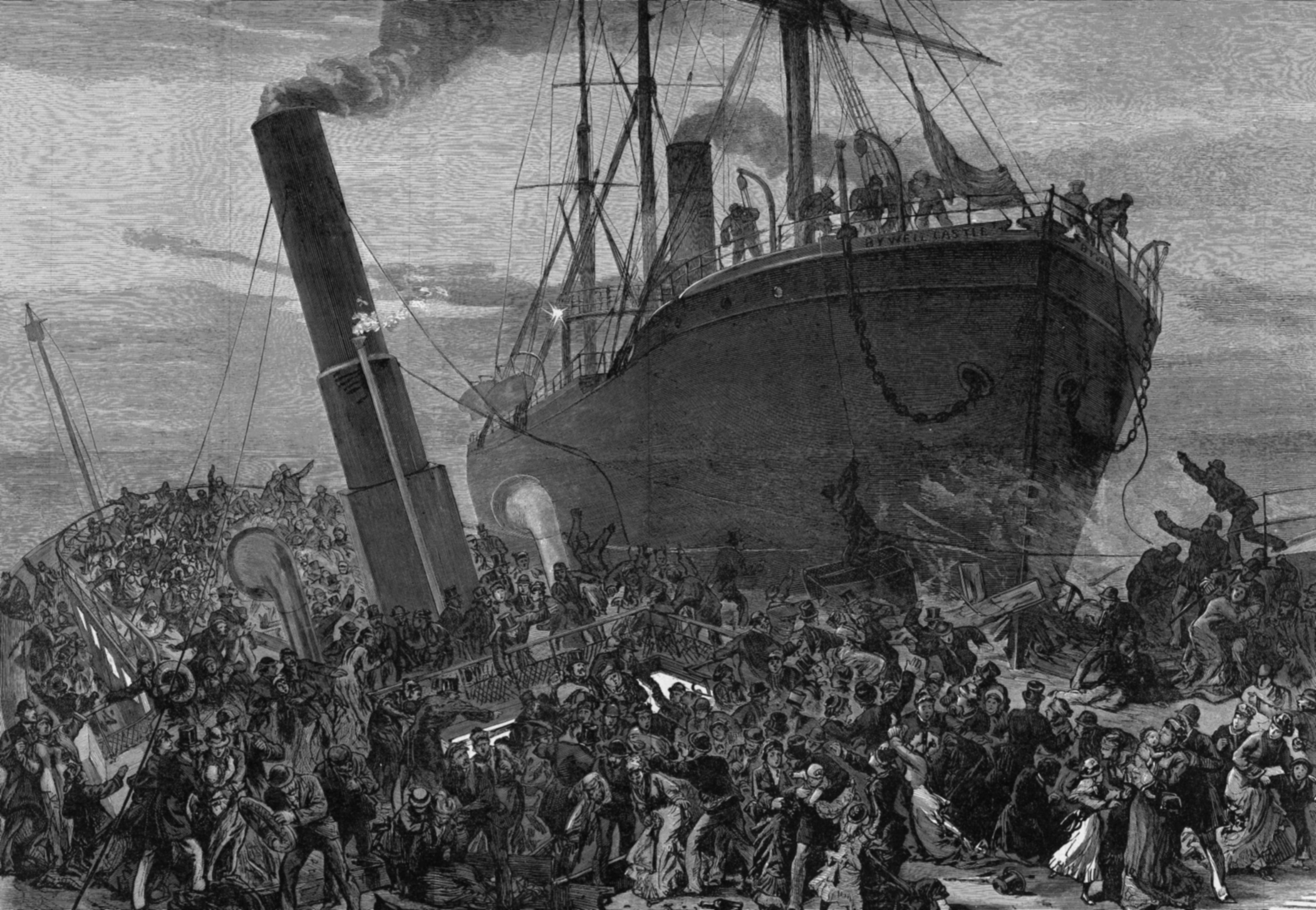
The Princess Alice disaster

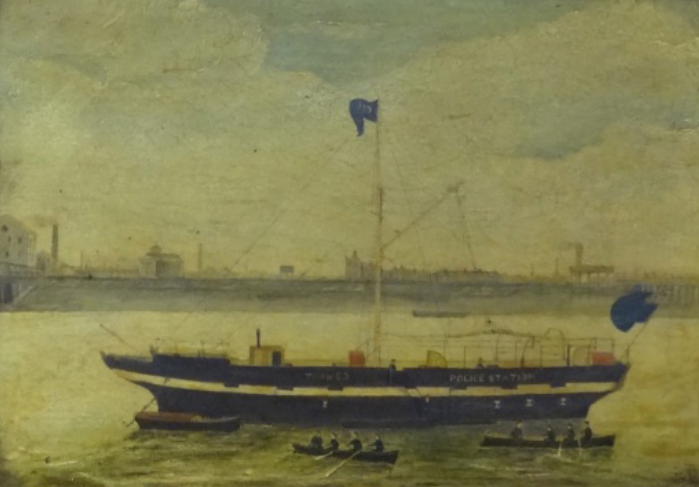
HMS Royalist, one of the hulks used to house officers of the River Police and Thames Division

In 1839 the Marine Police Force was merged into the Metropolitan Police Force, retaining its Wapping base. Initially patrols continued in rowing boats, some of which remained in use until 1905. Impetus to change was provided when, on 3 September 1878, the steam collier Bywell Castle ran into the pleasure steamer Princess Alice in Galleons Reach, resulting in the loss of over 600 lives. The subsequent inquest and inquiry recommended that Thames Division should have steam launches, as rowing galleys had shown themselves to be inadequate for police duty, and the first two were commissioned in the mid-1880s. In 1910 the first motor vessels were introduced.

Wapping and a number of ex-navy hulks were the Division's only bases until 1874, when it opened a station at Waterloo Police Pier (now Tower Lifeboat Station). A second land station was built further east at Blackwall in 1893 using land freed up from the General Steam Navigation Company's cattle wharf at Coldharbour - it was a three-storey building comprising cells, accommodation and a boat-launch. In 1907 the present Wapping station was built.

=== 1945–present ===
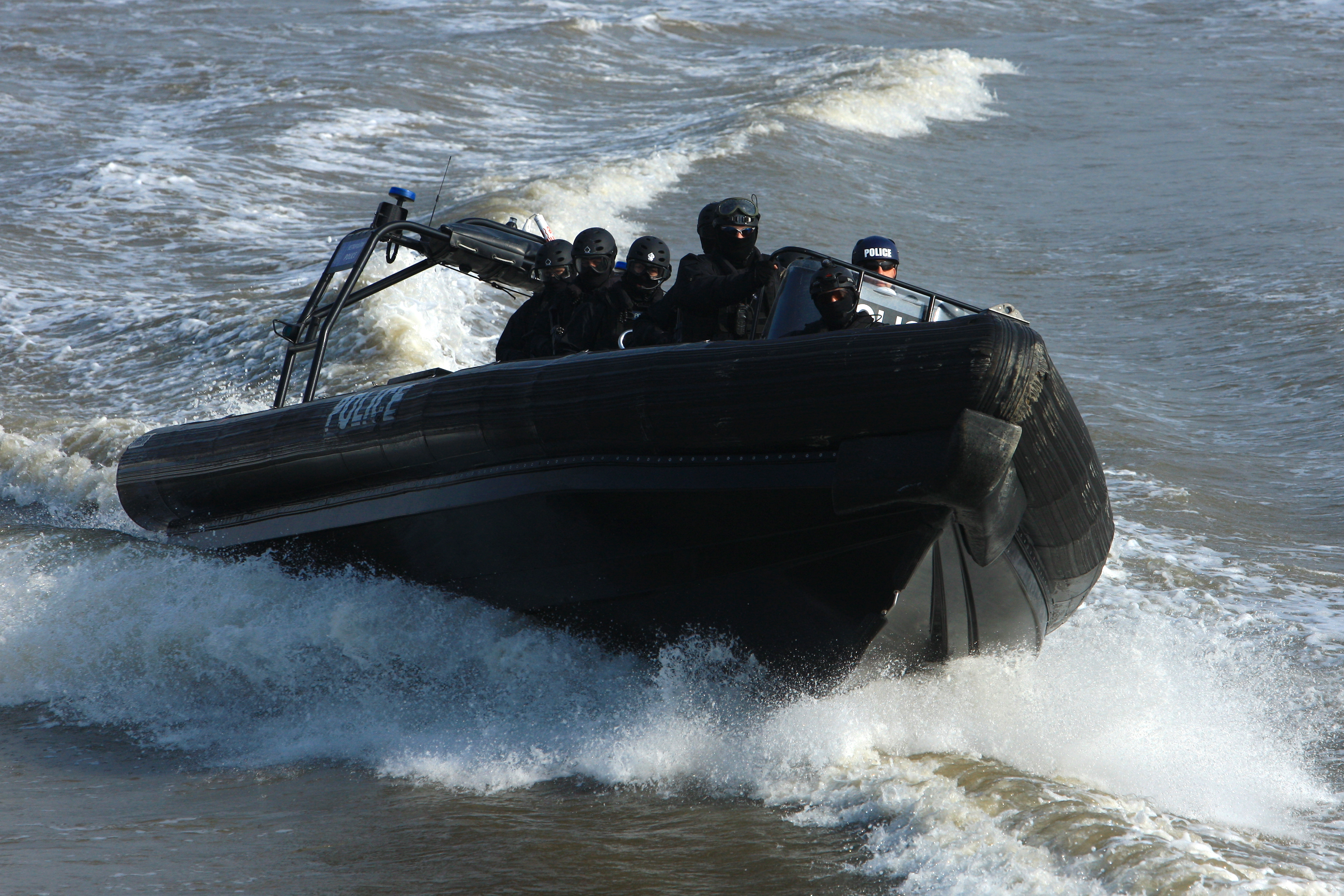
Metropolitan Police officers using a rigid inflatable boat during the London 2012 Olympic Games.

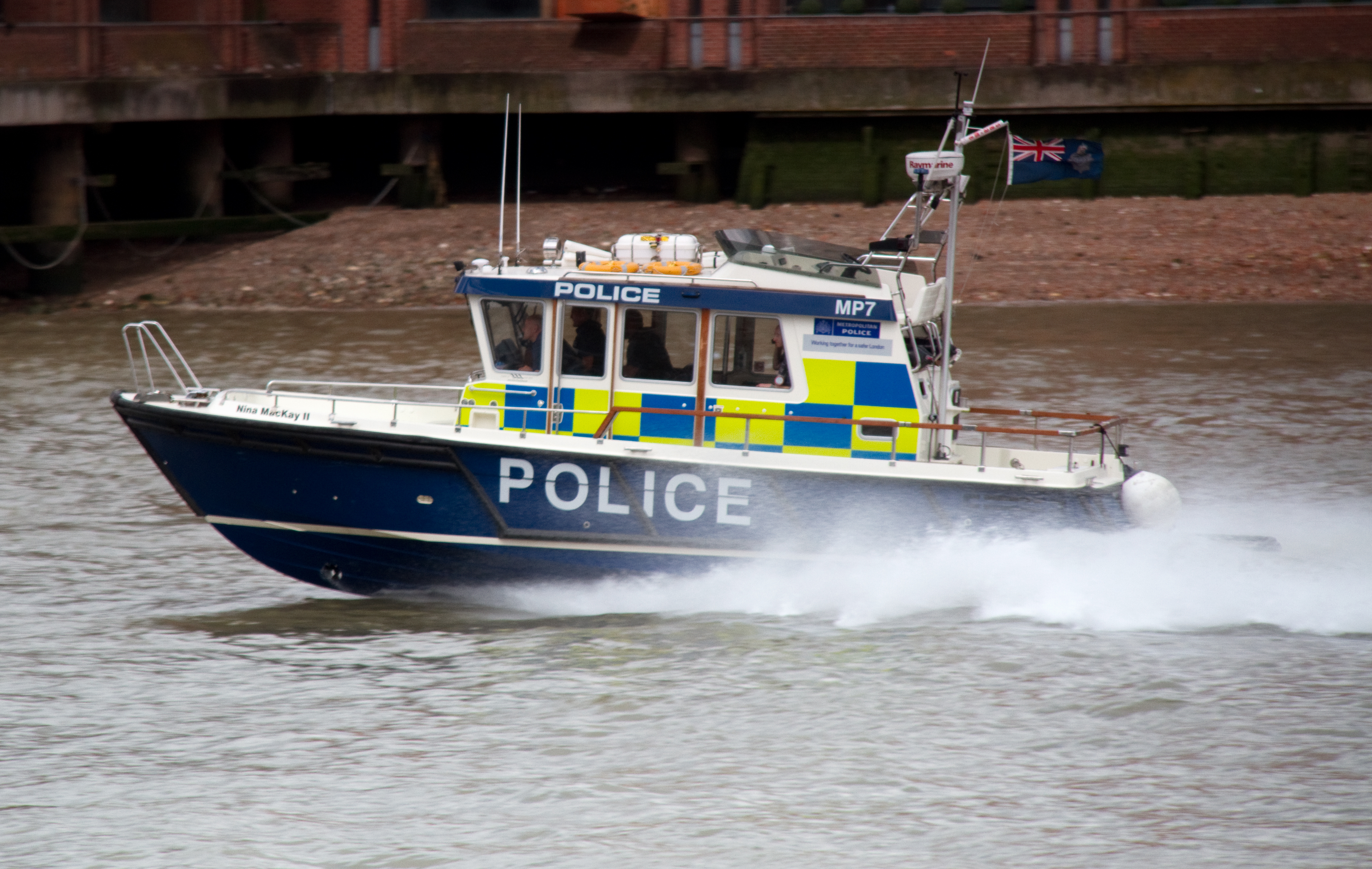
Nina MacKay II on the Thames in 2011, the Unit's second vessel named after Nina Mackay, a Met officer killed on duty in 1997.

Post-war Thames Division commemorated its founders with police vessel names including the supervision launches John Harriott (1947–1963) and Patrick Colquhoun (1963–2003), and Targa duty boats in use, the John Harriott and the Gabriel Franks.

Due to the decline of the docks on the Isle of Dogs in the late 20th century, the Blackwall River Police Station was closed in the 1970s and converted to residential properties in 1982. In November 1978, Thames Division became a specialist unit under the direct command of Assistant Commissioner "A".

On 20 August 1989 the Marchioness disaster occurred when an aggregate dredger, the Bowbelle, collided with a passenger vessel, the Marchioness, near Cannon Street Railway Bridge. Four Metropolitan Police patrol boats assisted in the rescue of 87 people. Fifty-one passengers died, though, and following subsequent inquiries the government asked the Maritime and Coastguard Agency, the Port of London Authority and the Royal National Lifeboat Institution to work together to set up a dedicated search and rescue service for the tidal River Thames. Consequently, on 2 January 2002, the RNLI set up four lifeboat stations at Gravesend, Tower Pier, Chiswick and Teddington, taking over the role of primary search and rescue service on the river from Thames Division.

In August 2020 funding was approved by the Mayor of London for the replacement of the 6 fast patrol vessels in use with the MPU - this would be 1 of the larger Command and Control Vessels and 5 Fast Patrol Vessels.

The new vessels were delivered in a phased programme with them being commissioned between January 2022 and March 2023.

The Fast Patrol Vessels are all Targa 32s and the new Command and Control Vessel is another Targa 37.

Table showing names and MPS codes for the 6 new vessels listed by date in to service
Vessel name	MPS Code	Commissioning Date
Sir Robert Peel III	MP9	January 2022
Gabriel Franks III	MP3	Spring 2022
Nina McKay III	MP4	August 2022
John Harriott V	MP7	Summer 2022
Peter Kruger (command vessel)	MP15	November 2022
Tim Ruprecht	MP2	March 2023
