= HMS Royalist (1841) =

Royal Navy ship

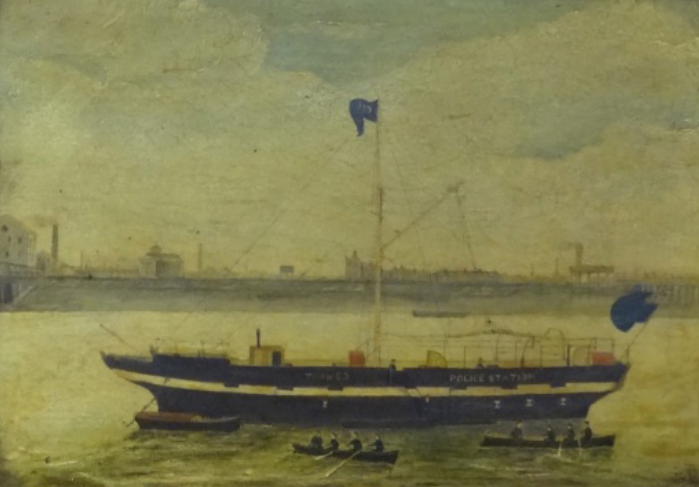
- HMS Royalist in use as a police station by an unknown 19th century artist (Thames Police Museum).

History

United Kingdom
- Name: HMS Royalist (previously Mary Gordon)
- Acquired: 1841
- Decommissioned: 1856
- In service: 1841
- Out of service: 1856
- Renamed: 1841
- Reinstated: 1894
- Fate: Broken up, 1894

HMS Royalist was a Royal Navy ship, built as the Mary Gordon and bought by the Navy on 9 July 1841 for £7200.

== History ==
She and HMS Sulphur were dismasted in a typhoon at Hong Kong on 20 July 1841. The following year she was recorded as stationed at Chusan, whilst in November 1844 she was mentioned as arriving in Singapore after losing three commanding officers and sailing under the command of her acting Second Master.

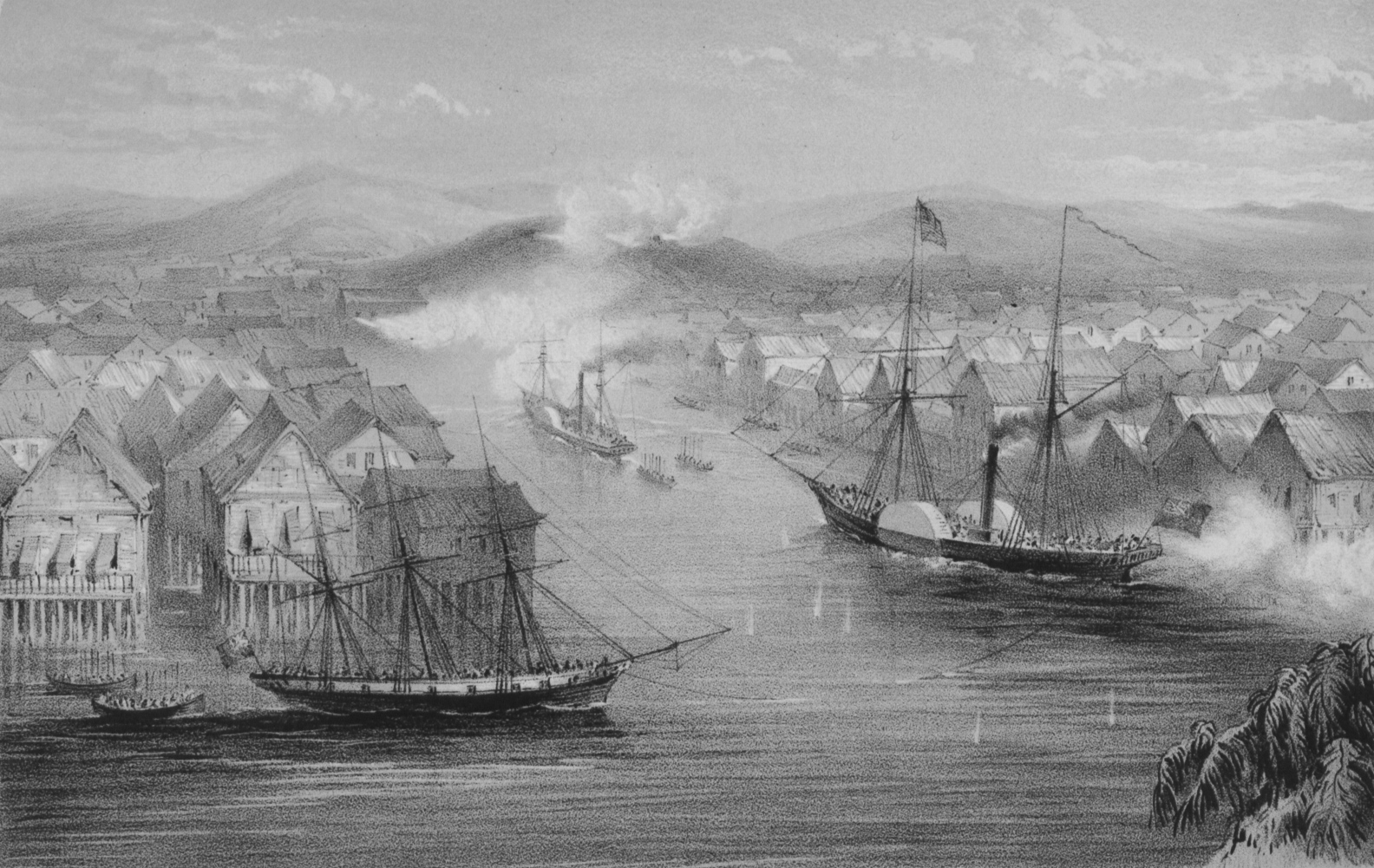
Capture of Brunei, 1846. HEICS Phlegethon in front, HMS Spiteful towing the Royalist (far left), by Rodney Mundy

She then served in Borneo, Hong Kong and the East Indies in general until 1856, when she left the navy and was acquired by the Thames Division of the Metropolitan Police.

With only one shore base (Wapping Police Station), Thames Division used Royalist as an additional floating police station - she was recorded as moored off Somerset House until 1874, when a new station was opened on land at Waterloo Pier. She then moved to East Greenwich in 1874. On 21 January 1878, she was run into by the steamship Chimborazo and was severely damaged. On 20 February, she was run into by the sailing ship Flying Venus and was severely damaged. On 13 October 1879, she was run into by the steamship Palmyra and was damaged.

Royalist remained at East Greenwich until the opening of the land-based police station at Blackwall in 1894. She was then returned to the Royal Navy and broken up.
