= E-class lifeboat =

RNLI lifeboat class

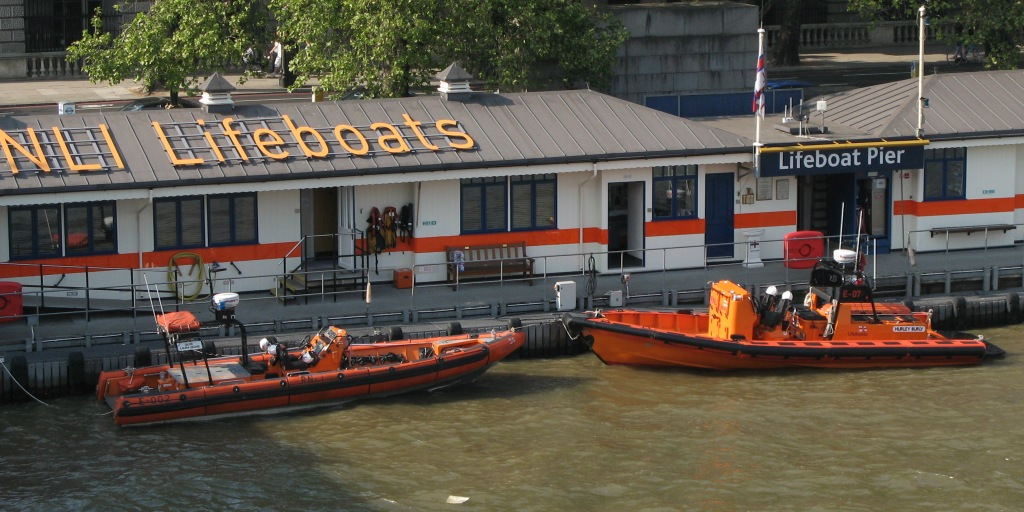
- Mark I E-002 (left) and Mark II E-07 (right) at Tower Lifeboat Station

Class overview
- Name: E-class
- Operators: Royal National Lifeboat Institution
- In service: 2002–present
- Completed: 10
- Active: 4
- Retired: 5
- Preserved: 1

General characteristics
- Displacement: 3.86 tonnes / 5.4 tonnes
- Length: 9 m (30 ft) / 10.5 m (34 ft)
- Beam: 2.94 m (9.6 ft) / 3.5 m (11 ft)
- Draught: 0.67 m (2.2 ft) / 0.7 m (2.3 ft)
- Propulsion: Diesel powered waterjets
- Speed: 33 knots (61 km/h) / 40 knots (74 km/h)
- Endurance: 4 hours / 3 hours
- Capacity: 20
- Complement: 3 / 4

The E-class lifeboat forms part of the Royal National Lifeboat Institution (RNLI) lifeboat fleet of the United Kingdom, operating exclusively in the tidal reach of the River Thames in London.

== History ==
The class was introduced in 2002, to serve the River Thames, which had not previously been covered by an RNLI rescue service. This was the result of a much delayed inquiry into the Marchioness disaster in 1989, in which 51 people died. The inquiry criticised the lack of a rescue service for the tidal Thames, and the UK government asked the Maritime and Coastguard Agency, the Port of London Authority and the RNLI to work together, to set up a dedicated Search and Rescue service for this stretch of the river.

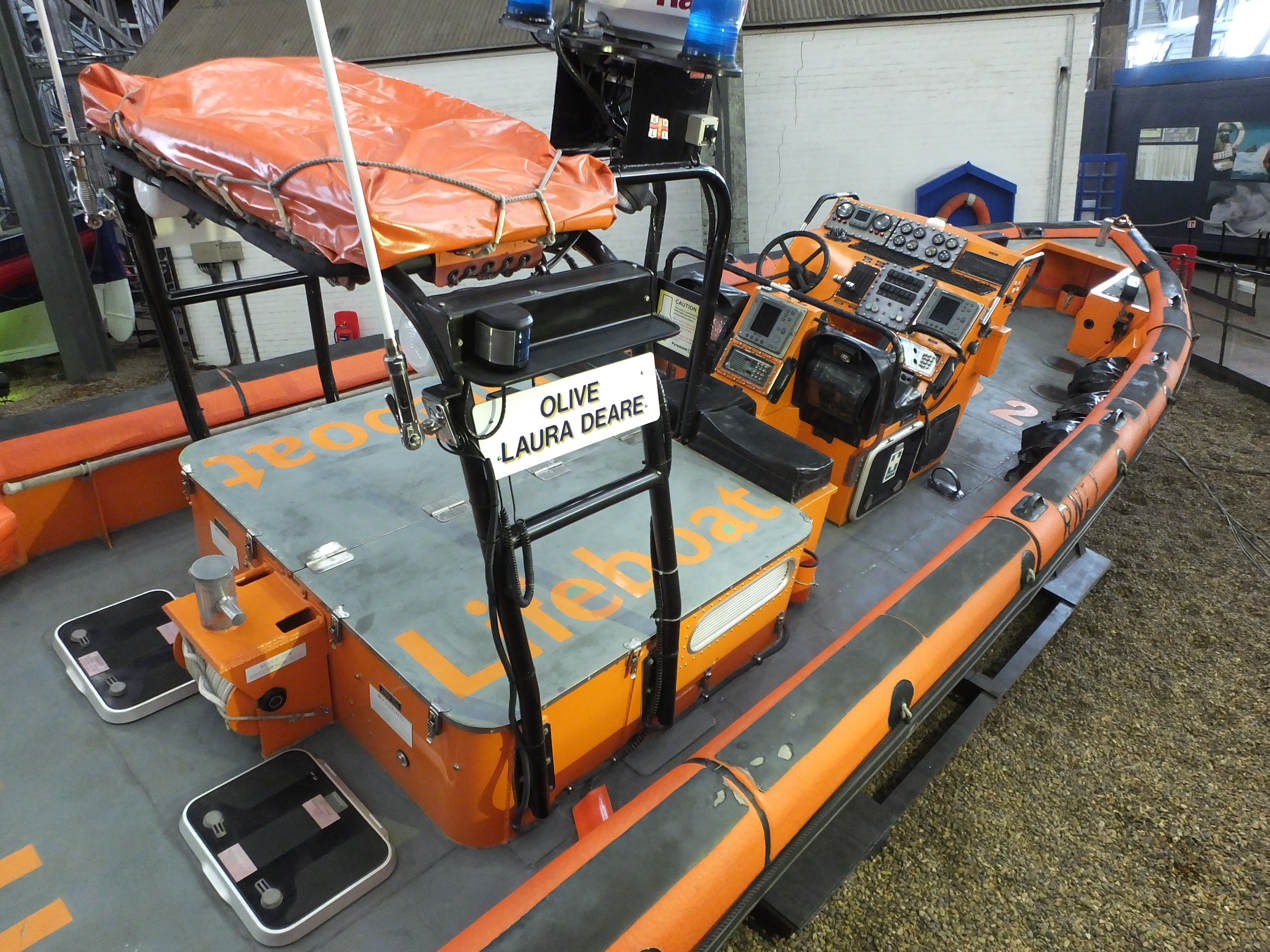
Gravesend Mk.I lifeboat Olive Laura Deare (E-002), now on display at Chatham Historic Dockyard

Four RNLI stations were established to cover the River Thames, Gravesend, Tower, Chiswick, and at Teddington, the latter operating the smaller D-class (IB1) Inshore lifeboat, allowing service inland beyond the tidal reach of the river at Teddington Lock.

An E-class boat, Olive Laura Deare (E-002), initially operated from Gravesend Lifeboat Station, to the east of London, but it proved less suitable for the more estuarine conditions found there, and was replaced with the B-class (Atlantic 85), Olive Laura Deare II (B-827), in 2008.

There are three different versions of the E-class, described as the Mark I, Mark II and Mark III. The Mark I boats operated from 2002, but their service came to an end in 2021, with the retirement of Legacy (E-005).

All versions of the E-class carry a variety of rescue equipment, including a marine VHF radio, a first aid kit, emergency defibrillator, a GPS navigation system, night vision equipment, a self-righting system, a radar interrogator, towing equipment, and lighting equipment.

As of December 2025, there are four E-class lifeboats in service: three Mark II's, split between Chiswick Lifeboat Station to the west of central London, and Tower Lifeboat Station at Victoria Embankment in central London, and a Mk III, Hearn Medicine Chest (E-10), operating at Tower.

A 4th E-class, a Valiant RIB, bearing no relationship to the Thames boats, was designated E-01 in 2001, and stationed at Enniskillen (Lower) in Northern Ireland between 2001 and 2003.

== Mark I ==
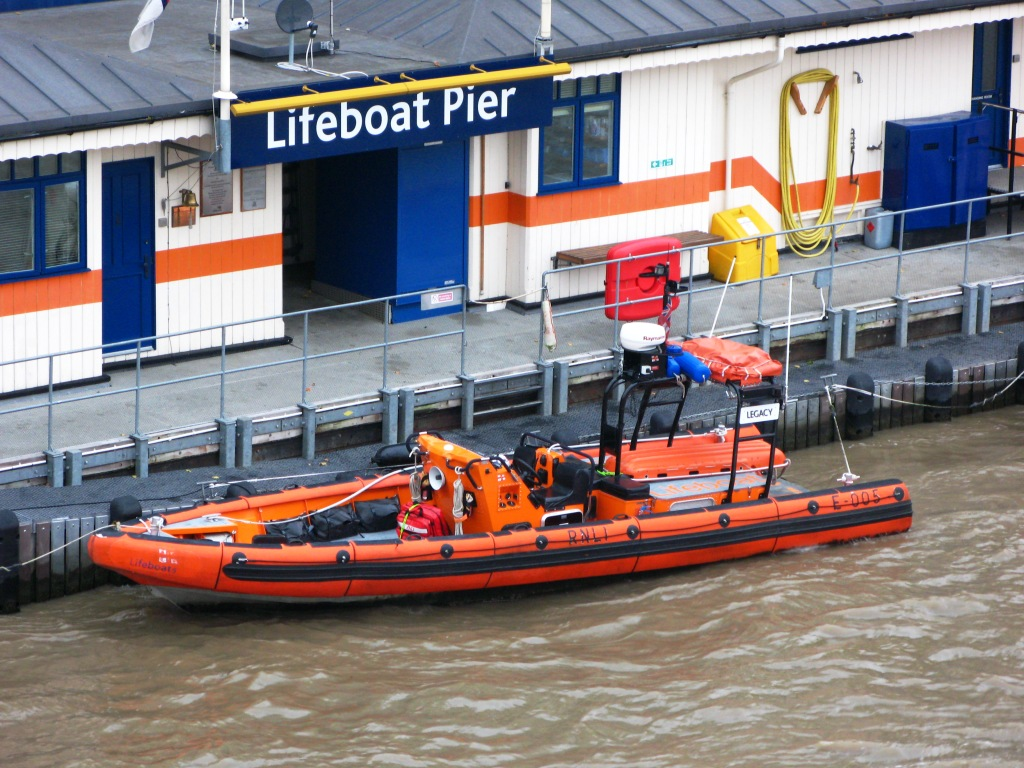
Mark I Legacy (E-005) on station

The Mark I boat was an off the shelf design built by Tiger Marine. It is made of an aluminium alloy with a closed cell polythene foam collar, and is powered by two Steyr marine diesel engines, each delivering 240 horsepower (180 kW) at 4,100rpm and driving Hamilton waterjets. This combination gives the boats a maximum speed of 33 knots (38 mph; 61 km/h) and the extreme maneuverability which is essential to enable crews to reach casualties in the fast flowing river.

The boat is 9 metres (30 ft) long, has a beam of 2.94 metres (9 ft 8 in), a draft of 0.64 metres (2 ft 1 in), a displacement of 3.86 tonnes (3.80 long tons; 4.25 short tons), and carries three crew. The maximum endurance at full speed is 4 hours.

Op. No. (Note: Op. No. is the RNLI's Operational Number of the boat carried on the hull.)	Name	In service	Principal Station	Comments
E-001	Public Servant (Civil Service No.44)	2002–2012	Tower	Damaged beyond repair, scrapped 2017.
E-001	Public Servant (Civil Service No.44)	2012–2015	Relief fleet	Damaged beyond repair, scrapped 2017.
E-002	Olivia Laura Deare	2002–2009	Gravesend	On display in RNLI Heritage Collection from 2012 at Chatham Historic Dockyard, December 2025.
E-002	Olivia Laura Deare	2009–2012	Relief fleet	On display in RNLI Heritage Collection from 2012 at Chatham Historic Dockyard, December 2025.
E-003	Chelsea Pensioner	2002–2015	Chiswick	
E-004	Ray and Audrey Lusty	2004–2012	Tower	
E-005	Legacy	2004–2018	Tower	
E-005	Legacy	2018–2021	Chiswick	
E-006	Joan and Ken Bellamy	2005–2018	Chiswick	Sold. Refit at Diverse Marine, Cowes, April 2023.

== Mark II ==
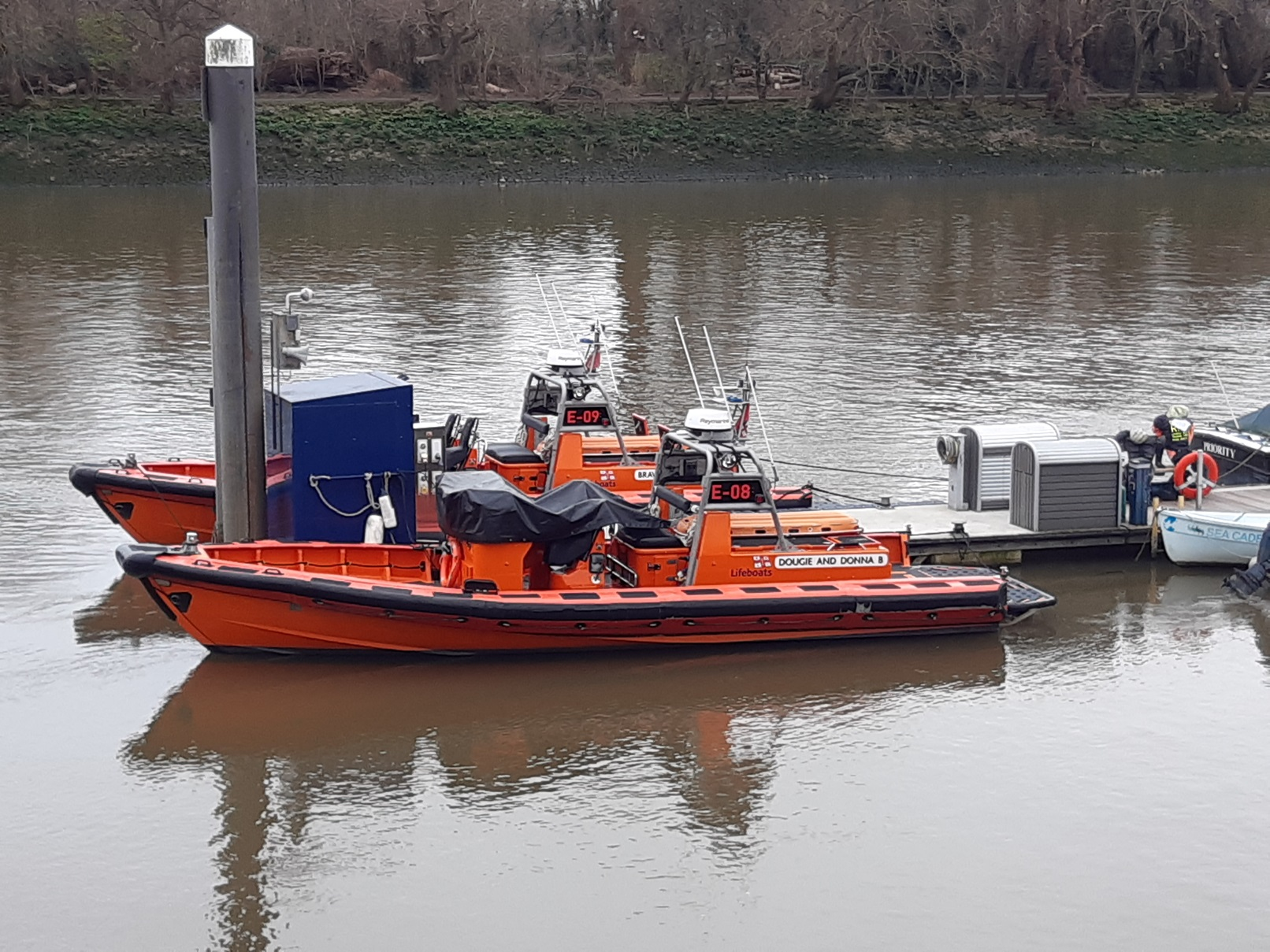
Mark II lifeboats Dougie and Donna B (E-08) and Brawn Challenge (E-09) at Chiswick

The Mark II boat was designed by RNLI engineers, incorporating experience gained with the Mark I boats, and built by Marine Specialised Technology in Liverpool. It has a glass epoxy-resin composite hull with a detachable polyurethane covered solid closed-cell foam collar, and is powered by two Volvo marine diesel engines delivering 435 horsepower (324 kW) each at 3,300rpm and driving Hamilton waterjets. This combination gives the boats an improved maximum speed of 40 knots (46 mph; 74 km/h).

The boat is 10.5 metres (34 ft) long, has a beam of 2.9 metres (9 ft 6 in) without collar and 3.5 metres (11 ft) with collar, a draft of 0.7 metres (2 ft 4 in), a displacement of 5.4 tonnes (5.3 long tons; 6.0 short tons), and carries four crew. The maximum endurance at full speed is 3 hours.

Op. No.	Name	In service	Principal Station	Comments
E-07	Hurley Burly	2012–	Tower	
E-08	Dougie and Donna B	2012–	Chiswick	
E-09	Brawn Challenge	2012–	Chiswick	

== Mark III ==
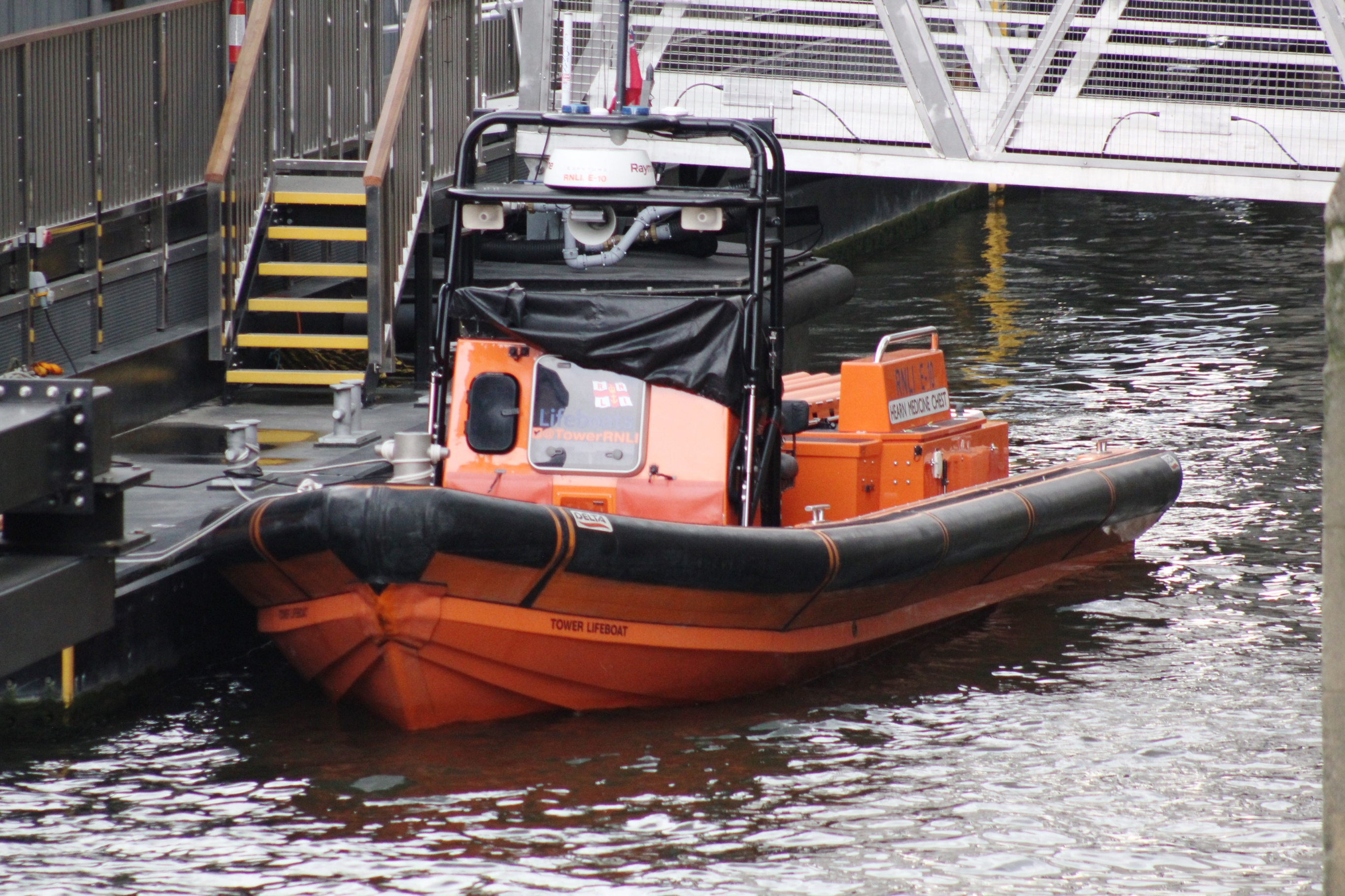
Hearn Medicine Chest (E-10) at Tower

The Mark III E-class Lifeboat is a Delta 1100TX 11m RIB Lifeboat, built by Delta Power Group of Hazel Grove, Stockport, Cheshire. The hull is a deep 'V' Glass Reinforced Plastic (GRP) moulding. It is powered by two Volvo D6-440 marine diesel engines delivering 440 horsepower and driving two Hamilton HJ274 waterjets, with a maximum speed of 45 knots (52 mph; 83 km/h).

The boat is 11.05 metres (36.3 ft) long, has a beam of 2.78 m (9 ft 1 in) without collar and 3.36 metres (11.0 ft) with collar, with a displacement of 7780 kg (with four crew). The maximum endurance at full speed is 3 hours.

Op. No.	Name	In service	Station	Comments
E-10	Hearn Medicine Chest	2019–	Tower	

== E-01 ==
For a short period, the RNLI operated a Valiant RIB at Enniskillen (Lower) Lifeboat Station, on Lough Erne in Northern Ireland, which was allocated the operational number E-01.

Op. No.	Name	In service	Station	Comments
E-01	Unnamed	2001–2003	Enniskillen (Lower)	

== See also ==
- List of RNLI stations
- List of former RNLI stations
- Royal National Lifeboat Institution lifeboats
