= Chiswick Lifeboat Station =

Lifeboat station in Chiswick, west London, on the River Thames

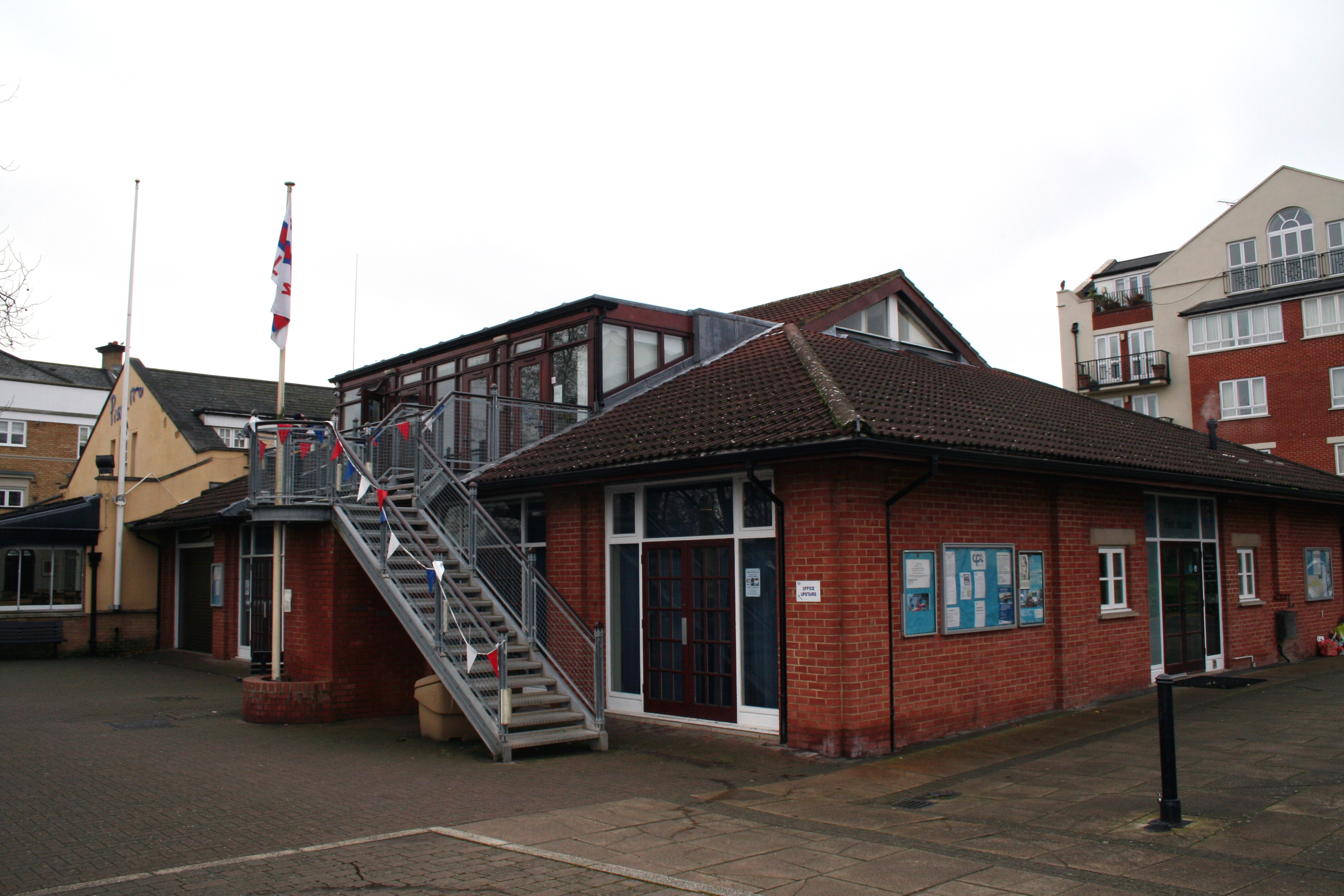
- RNLI lifeboat station by Chiswick Pier

- Location within Greater London

General information
- Type: RNLI Lifeboat Station
- Location: The Pier House, Corney Reach,, Chiswick, London, W4 2UG, United Kingdom
- Coordinates: 51°28′56″N 0°15′06″W
- Opened: 2002
- Owner: Royal National Lifeboat Institution

Website
- Chiswick RNLI Lifeboat Station

Chiswick Lifeboat Station was located on the north bank of the River Thames at Corney Reach, Chiswick, in west London.

The lifeboat station was established by the Royal National Lifeboat Institution (RNLI) in 2002. It s notable for being one of the first stations to cover a stretch of river, rather than estuarial waters or the sea.

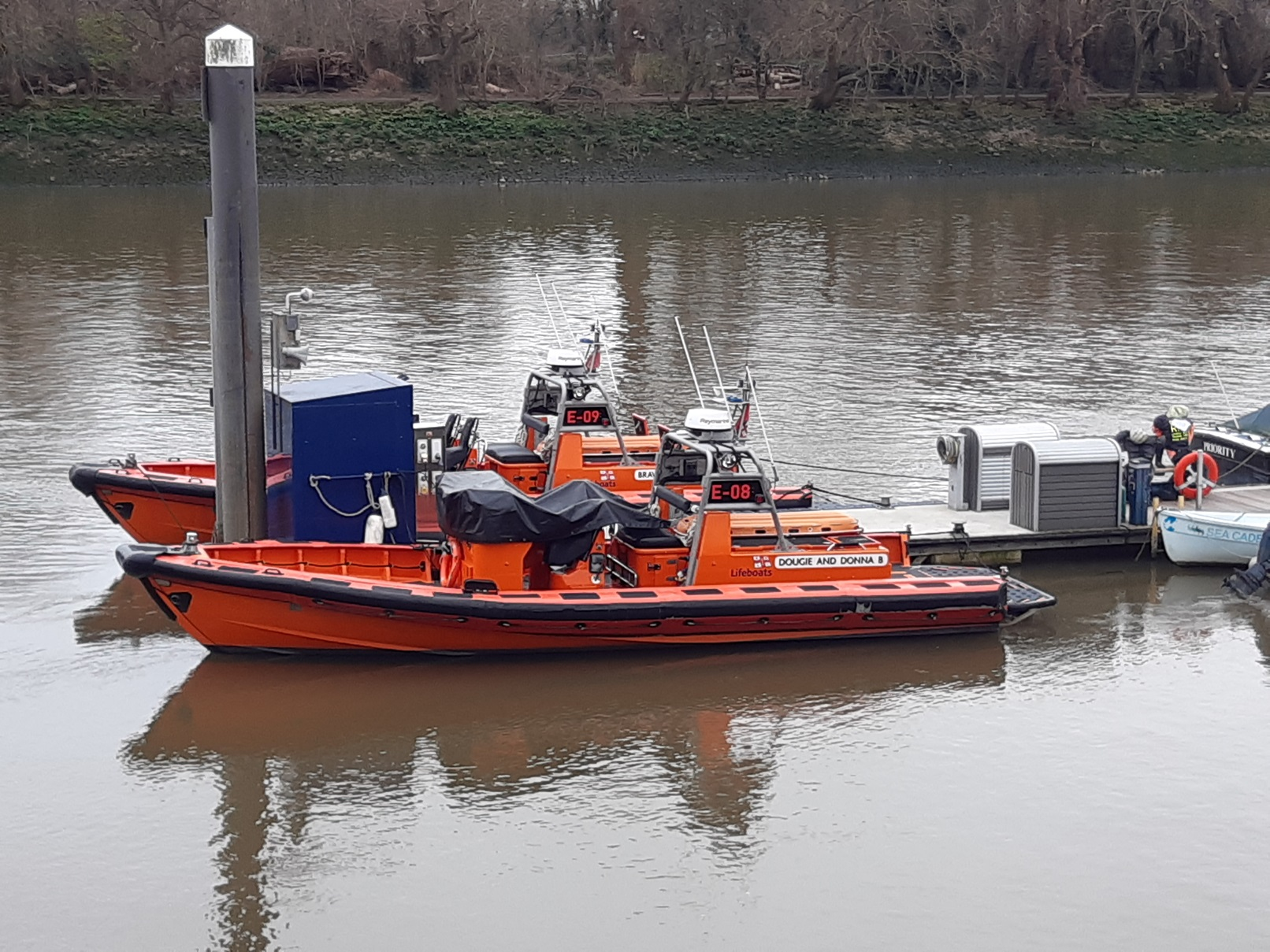
Chiswick RNLI lifeboats E-08 and E-09

The station closed in September 2026, when operations were relocated to the new Wandsworth Riverside station.

== History ==
The inquiry set up after the collision in 1989 between the Marchioness and the dredger Bowbelle, that resulted in the loss of 51 lives, recommended a dedicated search and rescue presence on the Thames. The government approached the RNLI, who agreed to provide a rescue service that covered the tidal Thames, between Teddington and the sea.

Locations were approved for stations at Teddington, Chiswick, Tower (located at Victoria Embankment next to Waterloo Bridge), and at Gravesend. All four stations became operational at the beginning of 2002.

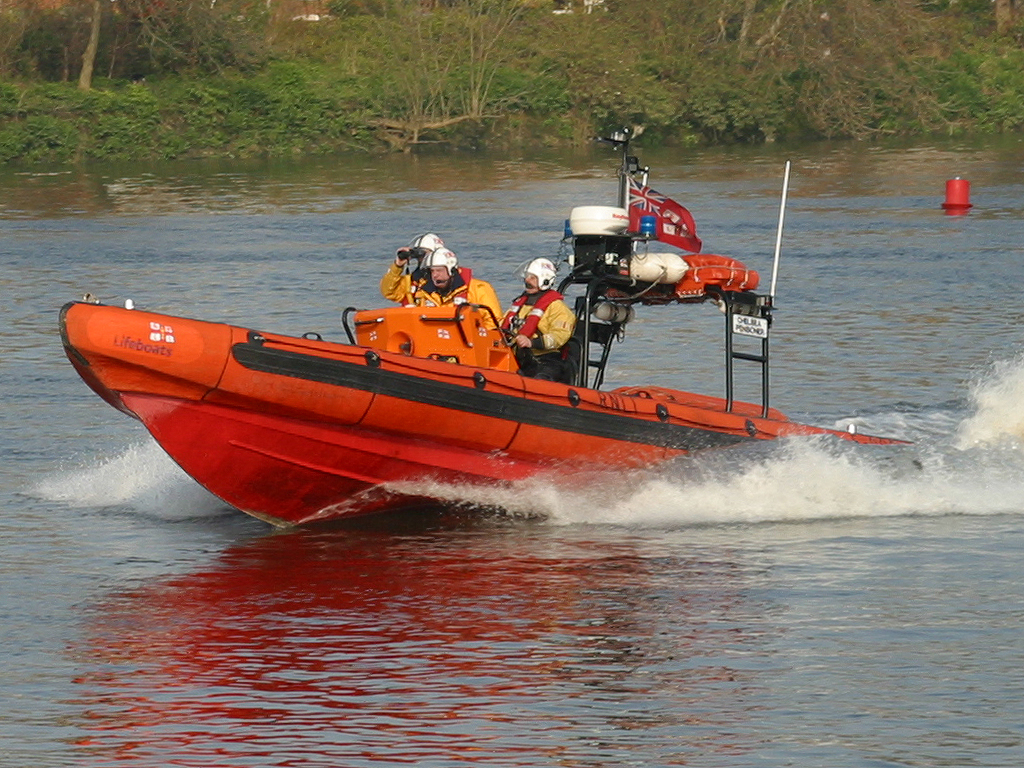
Chelsea Pensioner (E-003) on call

Chiswick Lifeboat Station commenced service on 2 January 2002, and operated initially with two temporary B-class (Atlantic 75) Inshore lifeboats. An E-class Tiger Marine fast response boat was soon placed on service, and was named Chelsea Pensioner (E-003) at a ceremony held at the Royal Hospital Chelsea on 19 July 2002. A second E-class lifeboat Joan and Kenneth Bellamy (E-006) also arrived on service at Chiswick in 2002.

Demand for the services of the Thames lifeboats proved to be much higher than originally anticipated. In 2002, their first year of operation, Thames lifeboats were called out over 800 times, accounting for 10% of the total number of call-outs, or "shouts", for the whole of the RNLI nationwide. Within two months of opening, Chiswick became, and continued to be, the UK's second busiest lifeboat station after Tower Lifeboat Station in Central London. Between 2002 and mid-2018, Chiswick was called to 3,387 incidents and rescued more than 1,620 people.

In 2012, three new E-class lifeboat Mark II lifeboats, E-07, E-08 and E-09, joined the Thames fleet at served at both Chiswick and Tower stations. Chelsea Pensioner (E-003) was retired in 2015, followed in 2018 by Joan and Kenneth Bellamy (E-006). With a new larger E-class lifeboat Mark III lifeboat arriving at Tower in 2019, Chiswick became the principal station for Dougie and Donna B (E-08), and Brawn Challenge (E-09).

== New station ==
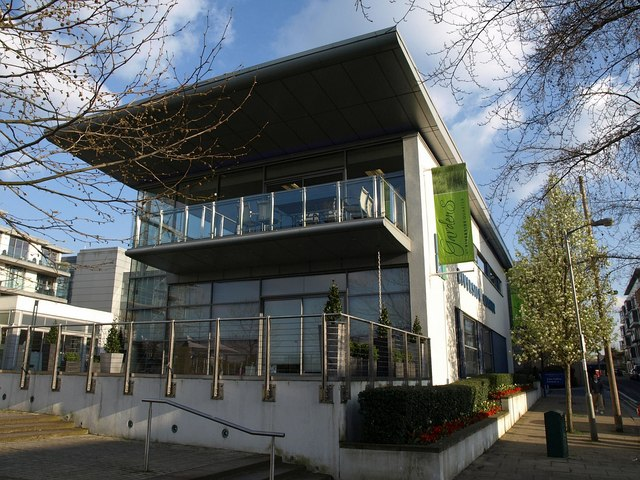
The Pavilion, Riverside Quarter

At Chiswick, the RNLI shared the building with the Chiswick Pier Trust. With insufficient storage facilities, the 60 volunteers had to take their kit home after every shift. The meeting rooms, kitchen and toilets were all shared spaces. In late 2023, with the Chiswick station no longer large enough for operational requirements, the RNLI acquired the former marketing building in Wandsworth Riverside Quarter, approximately 3.5 miles (5.6 km) downstream from the Chiswick station.

Planning permission was granted for change of use, with the building converted to be the new lifeboat station.

Operations began from Wandsworth Riverside on 22 October 2026.

== Chiswick lifeboats ==
Op.No. (Note: Op.No. is the RNLI's Operational Number of the boat carried on the hull.)	Name	On station	Class	Comments
B-767	Maritime Nation	2002	B-class (Atlantic 75)	
B-734	Amy Constance	2002–2004	B-class (Atlantic 75)	
E-003	Chelsea Pensioner	2002–2015	E-class (Mk.I)	
E-006	Joan and Kenneth Bellamy	2002–2018	E-class (Mk.II)	
E-005	Legacy	2018–2021	E-class (Mk.II)	
E-08	Dougie and Donna B	2012–2026	E-class (Mk.II)	Transferred to Wandsworth Riverside.
E-09	Brawn Challenge	2012–2026	E-class (Mk.II)	Transferred to Wandsworth Riverside.

Station closed in 2026.

== See also ==
- List of RNLI stations
- List of former RNLI stations
- Royal National Lifeboat Institution lifeboats
