= Tower Lifeboat Station =

Lifeboat pier on the River Thames in London

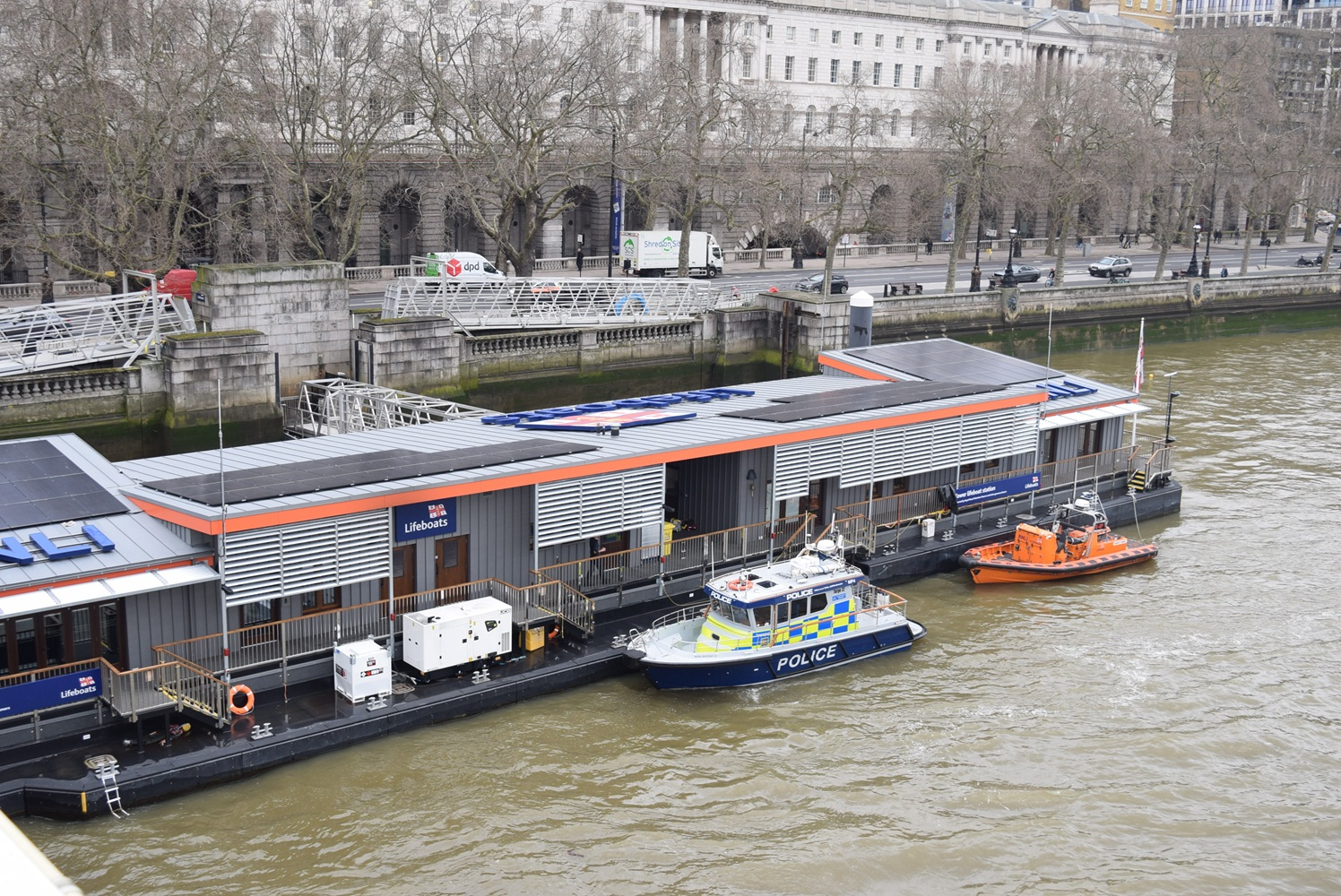
- Tower Lifeboat Station

- Location within City of Westminster

General information
- Type: Lifeboat station
- Location: Tower Lifeboat Station, Lifeboat Pier, Victoria Embankment, Westminster, London, WC2R 2PP, England
- Coordinates: 51°30′36″N 0°07′03″W
- Opened: 2002
- Owner: RNLI

Technical details
- Material: Pier

Website
- Tower RNLI Lifeboat Station

Tower Lifeboat Station is located on a custom made Floating dock (jetty), at Victoria Embankment on the North Bank of the River Thames, next to Waterloo Bridge.

It is one of the newest lifeboat stations operated by the Royal National Lifeboat Institution (RNLI), established in 2002.

Two E-class lifeboats, Hurley Burley (E-07), since 2012, and Hearn Medicine Chest (E-10), since 2019, are principally stationed at Tower Lifeboat Station. The E-class lifeboats are capable of 40-knots, and are the fastest lifeboats in the RNLI fleet.

== History ==
A new search and rescue service for the River Thames was announced on 22 January 2001. The RNLI was asked by the Government to provide lifeboat cover, the first time it had been specifically asked to cover a river rather than estuarial waters. This came as a result of the findings of the Thames Safety Inquiry into the collision between the pleasure cruiser Marchioness and the dredger Bowbelle, which resulted in the loss of 51 lives in 1989.

Locations were approved for stations at Teddington, Chiswick, Tower, and at Gravesend. All four stations became operational at the beginning of 2002.

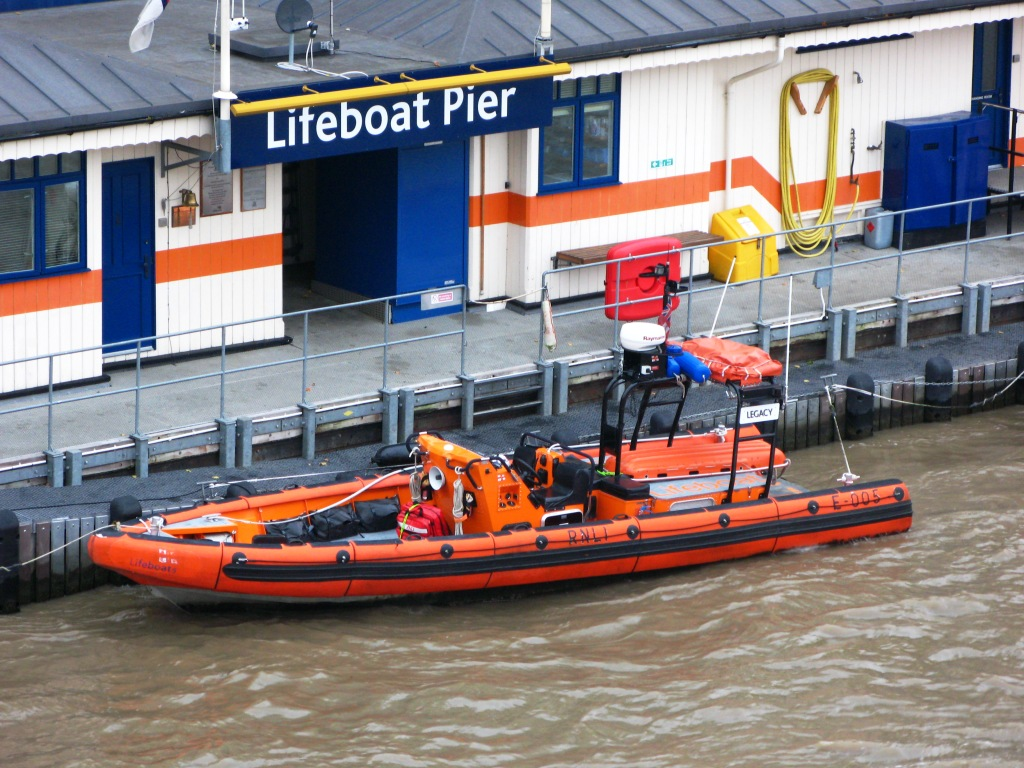
E-class lifeboat Legacy (E-005)

At 12:00 on 2 January 2002, Tower Lifeboat Station was established at Tower Pier, next to the Tower of London, when the new search and rescue arrangements for the tidal reaches of the River Thames came into operation, with an E-class lifeboat placed on service. The four Thames lifeboat stations are among nine RNLI stations now operating on inland waterways, with four in Ireland, and one at Loch Ness.

The station is staffed continuously to provide an immediate response and is coordinated by the Maritime and Coastguard Agency from a Port of London Authority operations room at the Thames Barrier. Two of the three-person crew at each station are full-time and the third crew member is a volunteer. This enables the boats to arrive at any incident within 15 minutes.

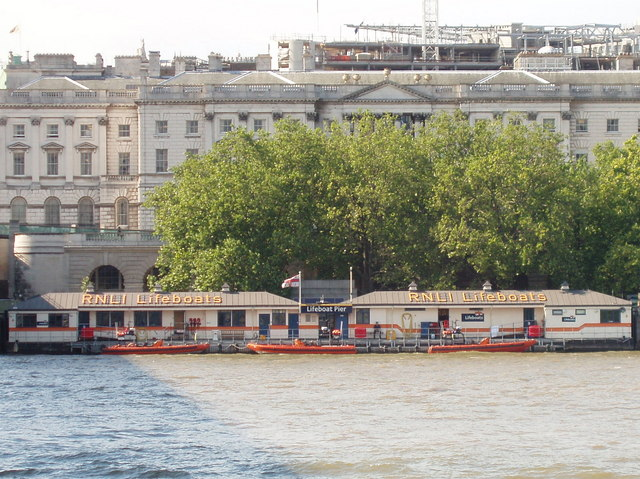
Former Tower Lifeboat Station

In 2004, the RNLI acquired the Floating dock (jetty) at Waterloo Bridge, formerly known as the Waterloo Police Pier, and a base for the Thames River Police. After conversion work, Tower Lifeboat Station was relocated, and has operated from this location since 2006. The name "Tower Lifeboat Station" was retained.

Three new E-class lifeboat Mark II lifeboats, Hurley Burley (E-07), Dougie and Donna B (E-08) and Brawn Challenge (E-09), joined the Thames fleet in 2012, and served at both Tower and Chiswick stations. Ray and Audrey Lusty (E-004) was retired in 2012, and Legacy (E-005) moved over to Chiswick in 2018. With the arrival of a new bigger E-class lifeboat Mark III lifeboat (E-10) at Tower in 2019, Tower became the principal station for Hurley Burley (E-07) and Hearn Medicine Chest (E-10).

== New facilities ==
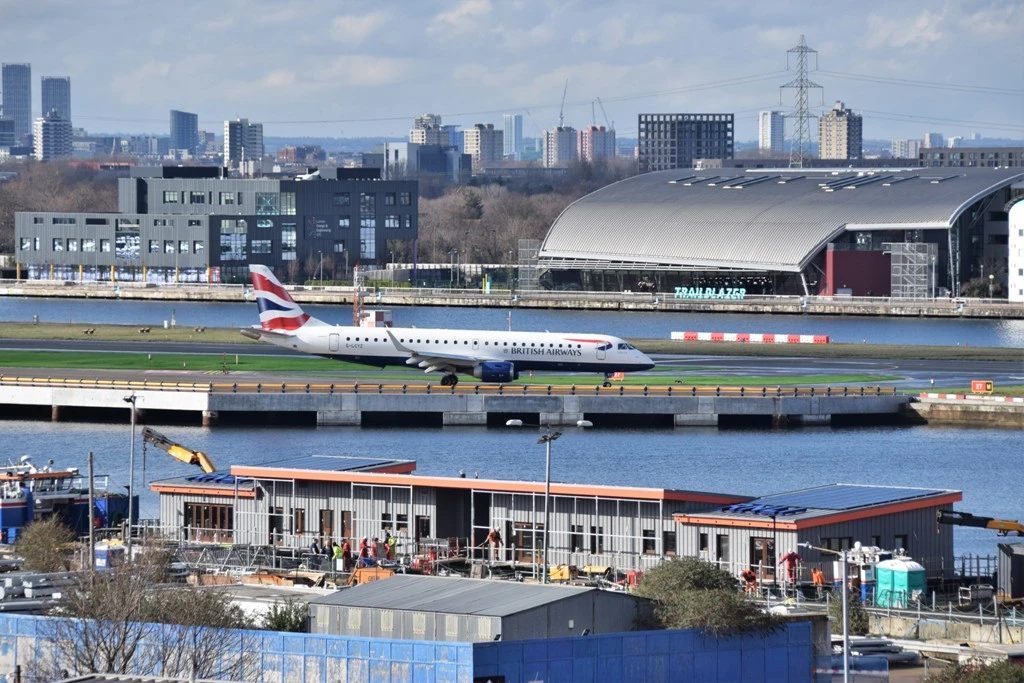
A view looking across the King George V Dock in East London showing the building of the new RNLI Tower Lifeboat Station with a British Airways plane at London City Airport in the background. Image dated 17th March 2023

On 13 January 2023, the lifeboats and crew were temporarily relocated to HMS President, the Royal Naval Reserve's training facility in London near Tower Bridge.

The original Floating dock (jetty) was withdrawn from service, and was removed from its mooring on 24 January 2023. In July 2024, the former station departed its storage location in the Royal Docks, and was towed to Ramsgate Harbour to be repurposed.

A new, purpose built, floating lifeboat station was delivered to the site at Waterloo Bridge on 30 March 2023, having been constructed over a period of 5 months at the King George V Dock in London's Royal Docks.

On Friday, 28 April 2023, operations were transferred to the new station at Waterloo Bridge. The new Tower Lifeboat Station was officially opened by HRH The Duke of Kent on Friday, 23 June 2023.

== Station honours ==
The following are awards made at Tower.

- Framed certificate for First Aid, signed by Surgeon Rear Admiral F. Golden and the Chief Executive.

Mike Sinacola, Helm – 2004
Michael Neild, Mechanic – 2004
Will Laurie, crew member – 2004

- A Framed Letter of Thanks signed by the Chair of the Institution

Jai Gudgion, Commander – 2024
Craig Burn, Commander – 2024
Paul Tattam, crew member – 2024

- Member, Order of the British Empire (MBE)

Anthony Alexander Vlasto, President, City of London RNLI Committee – 2025KBH

== Tower lifeboats ==
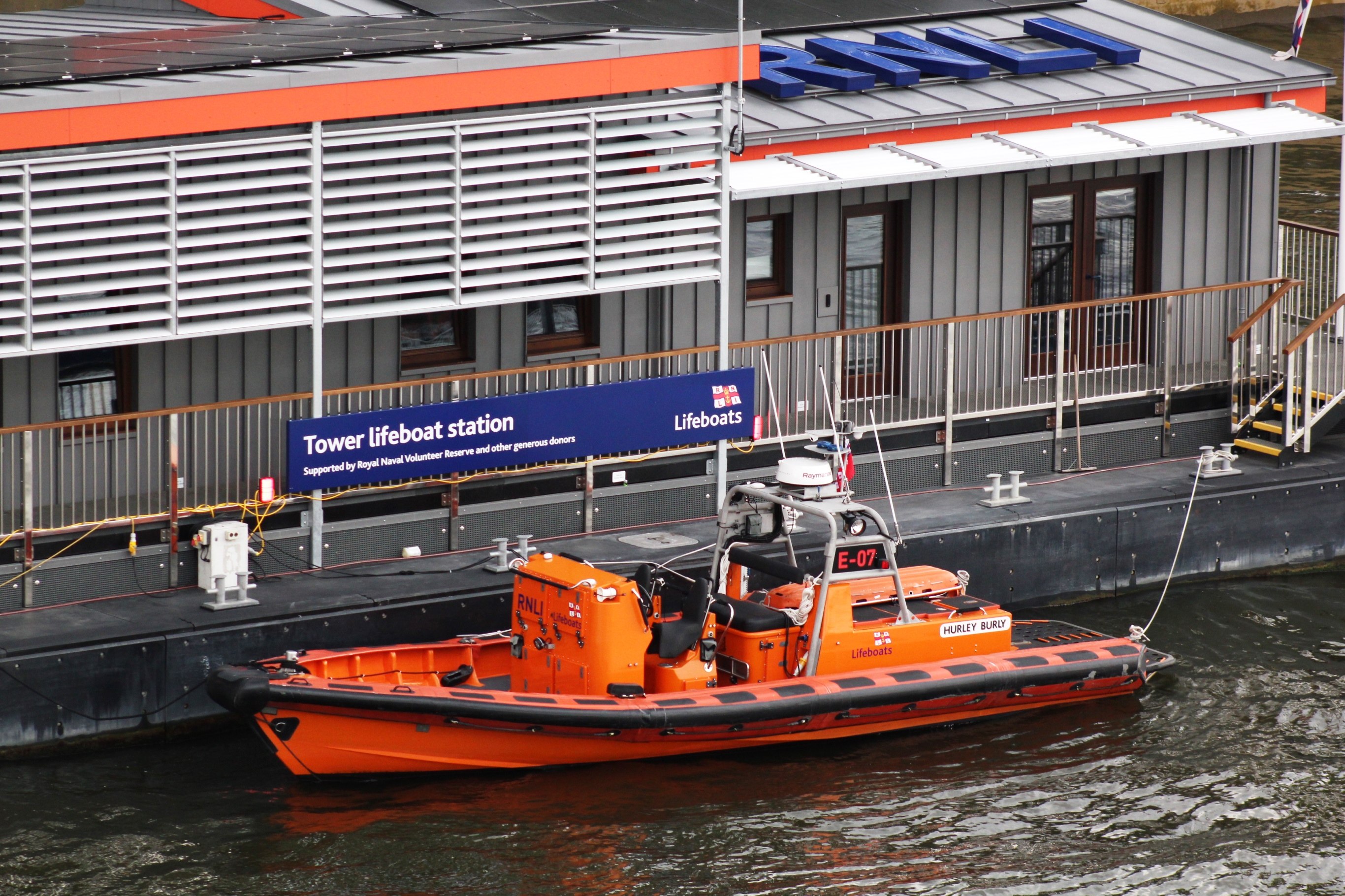
Hurley Burley (E-07)

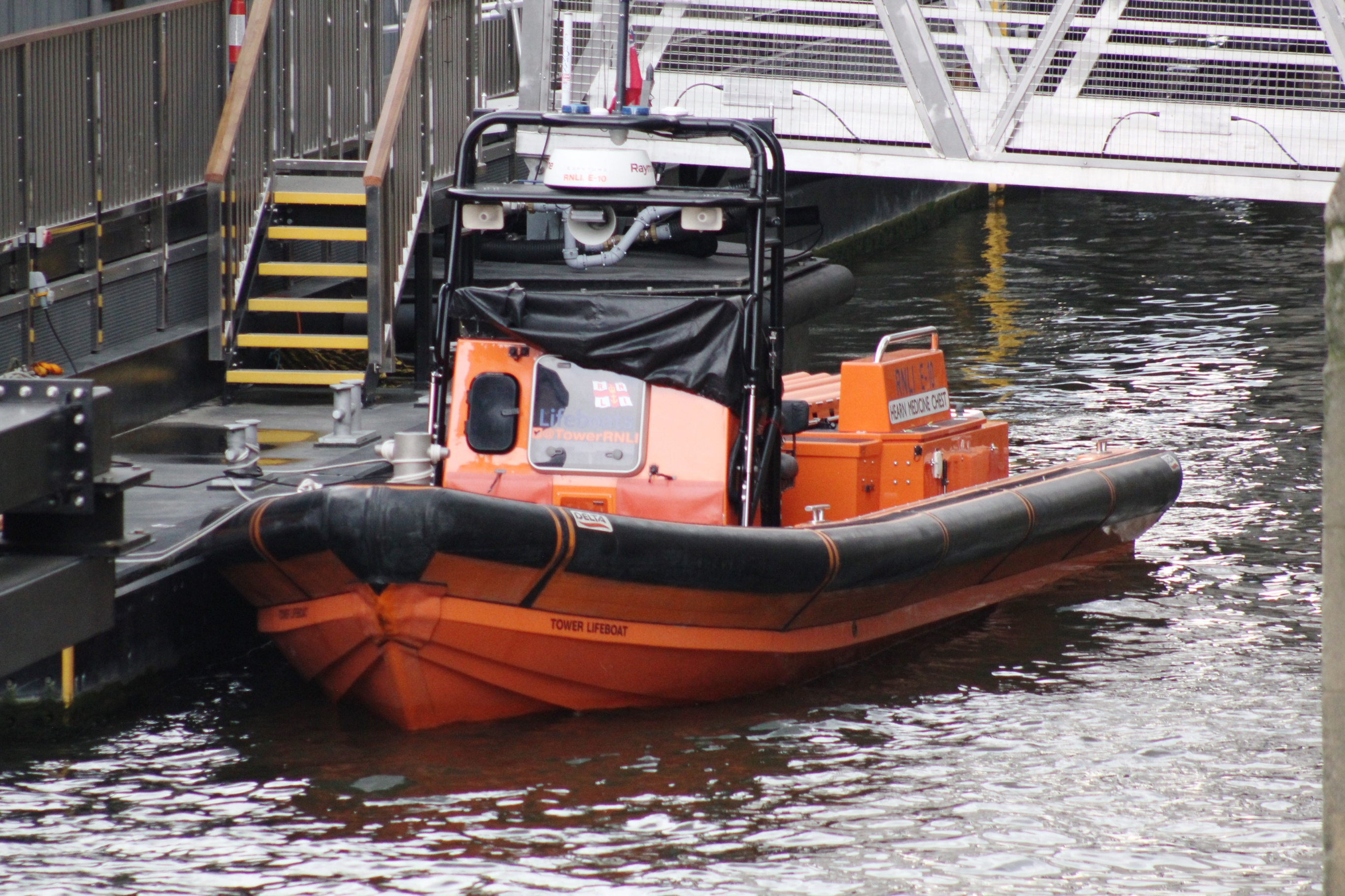
Hearn Medicine Chest (E-10)

On Station	Op. No. (Note: Op. No. is the RNLI's Operational Number of the boat carried on the hull.)	Name	Class	Comments
2002–2012	E-001	Public Servant (Civil Service No.44)	E-class (Mk I)	
2002–2012	E-004	Ray and Audrey Lusty	E-class (Mk I)	
2002–2018	E-005	Legacy	E-class (Mk I)	
2006	B-801	The Drayton Manor	B-class (Atlantic 85)	
2012–	E-07	Hurley Burley	E-class (Mk II)	
2019–	E-10	Hearn Medicine Chest	E-class (Mk III)	

== See also ==
- List of RNLI stations
- List of former RNLI stations
- Royal National Lifeboat Institution lifeboats
