= Gravesend Lifeboat Station =

RNLI Lifeboat station on the River Thames in Kent

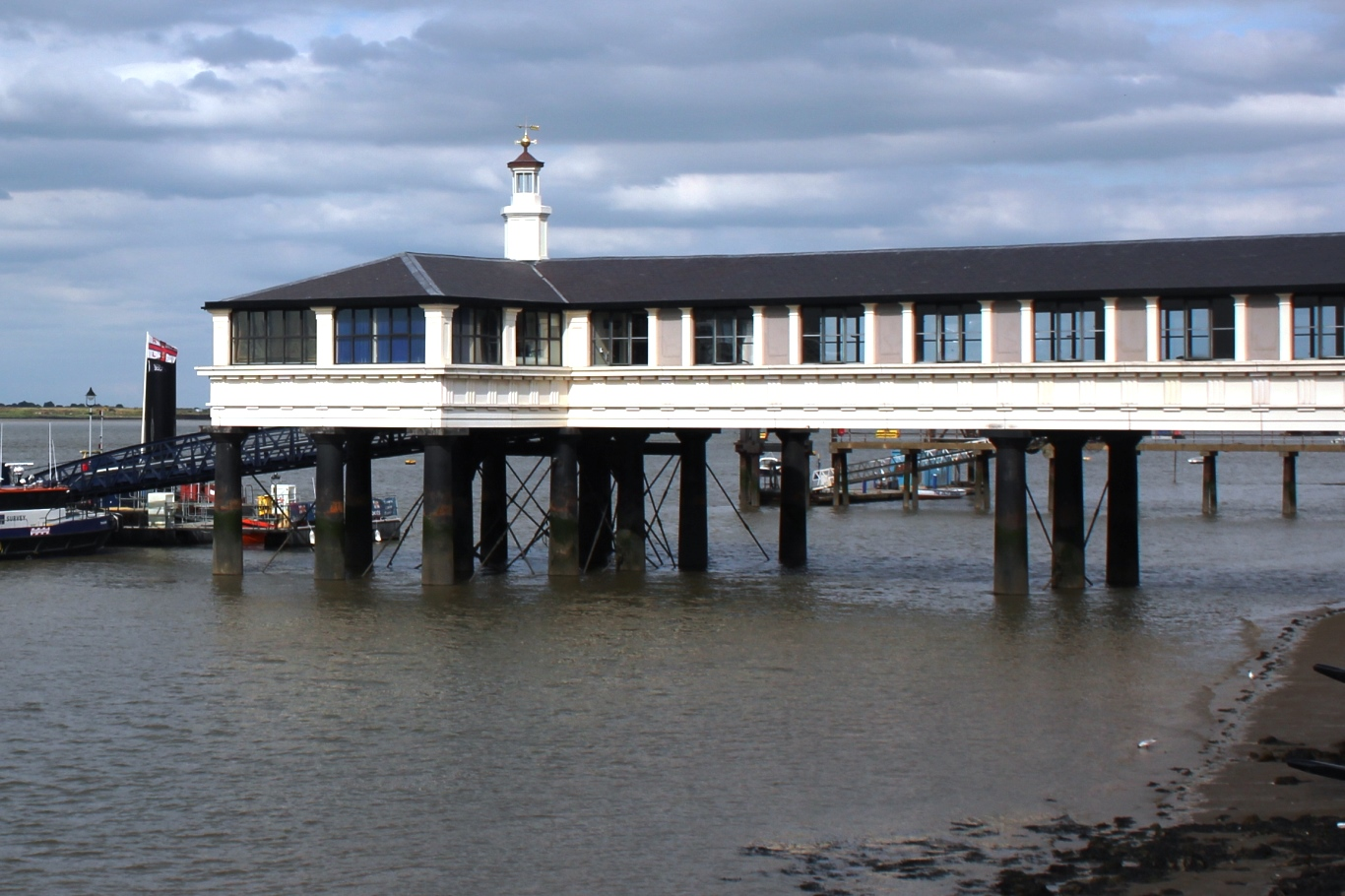
- Royal Terrace Pier, Gravesend

- Location within Kent

General information
- Type: Lifeboat station
- Location: Royal Terrace Pier, Royal Pier Road,, Gravesend, Kent, DA12 2BG, United Kingdom
- Coordinates: 51°26′43″N 0°22′29″E
- Opened: 2002
- Owner: RNLI

Website
- Gravesend RNLI Lifeboat Station

Gravesend Lifeboat Station is situated on the Royal Terrace Pier in Gravesend, approximately 25 miles (40 km) downstream from the centre of London, on the southern shore of the River Thames, in the county of Kent.

It is one of the newest lifeboat stations operated by the Royal National Lifeboat Institution (RNLI), established in 2002, and one of the first to cover a river rather than the sea or estuarial waters.

The station currently operates a B-class (Atlantic 85) Inshore lifeboat, Olive Laura Deare II (B-827), on station since 2008.

In 2026 it was announced on social media by the RNLI that Gravesend would receive an E-class Lifeboat, to replace the B-class currently on station. This new E-class would also be part of the RNLI's Launch a Memory campaign.

== Establishment ==
The inquiry set up after the 1989 collision on the Thames in London between the Marchioness and the dredger Bowbelle, that resulted in the loss of 51 lives, recommended a dedicated search and rescue presence on the Thames. As a part of this, the government approached the RNLI, who agreed to provide a rescue service that covered the tidal Thames between Teddington and the Channel. Locations were approved for stations at Teddington, Chiswick, Tower and Gravesend. These all became operational at the beginning of 2002, with Gravesend covering the river from the Thames Barrier at Woolwich to the western end of Canvey Island, a distance of 26 miles.

== History ==
Gravesend Lifeboat Station commenced service on 2 January 2002. After initial operations and training using two B-class (Atlantic 75) Inshore lifeboats, one of the Atlantic-75 lifeboats was replaced with an E-class Tiger Marine fast response boat, specially modified for work on the Thames.

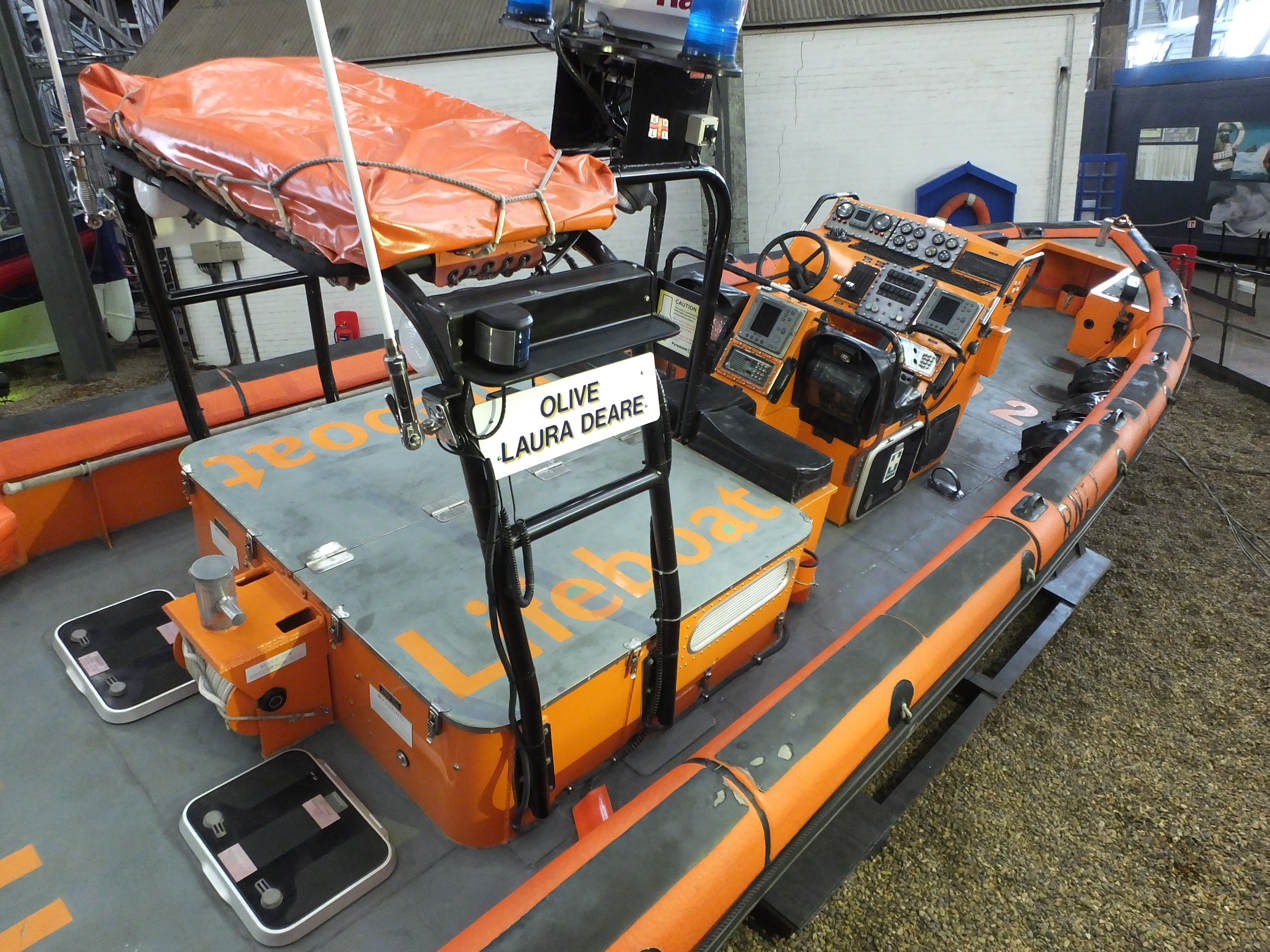
Olive Laura Deare (E-002)

The new lifeboat was funded from the bequest of the late Mrs Olive Laura Deare, who had lived in the Gravesend area all her life. Her grandparents had operated fishing boats from Gravesend. On the 26 April 2003, a ceremony was held in the New Tavern Fort gardens. After a blessing by the Rev. Andrew Huckett, the lifeboat was officially named Olive Laura Deare (E-002).

Previously housed in portacabins in a near-by car-park, the station was relocated to the end of the Royal Terrace Pier in June 2007, adjacent to the pontoon where the lifeboat is moored. This move provided much improved crew facilities, and helped reduce launch times.

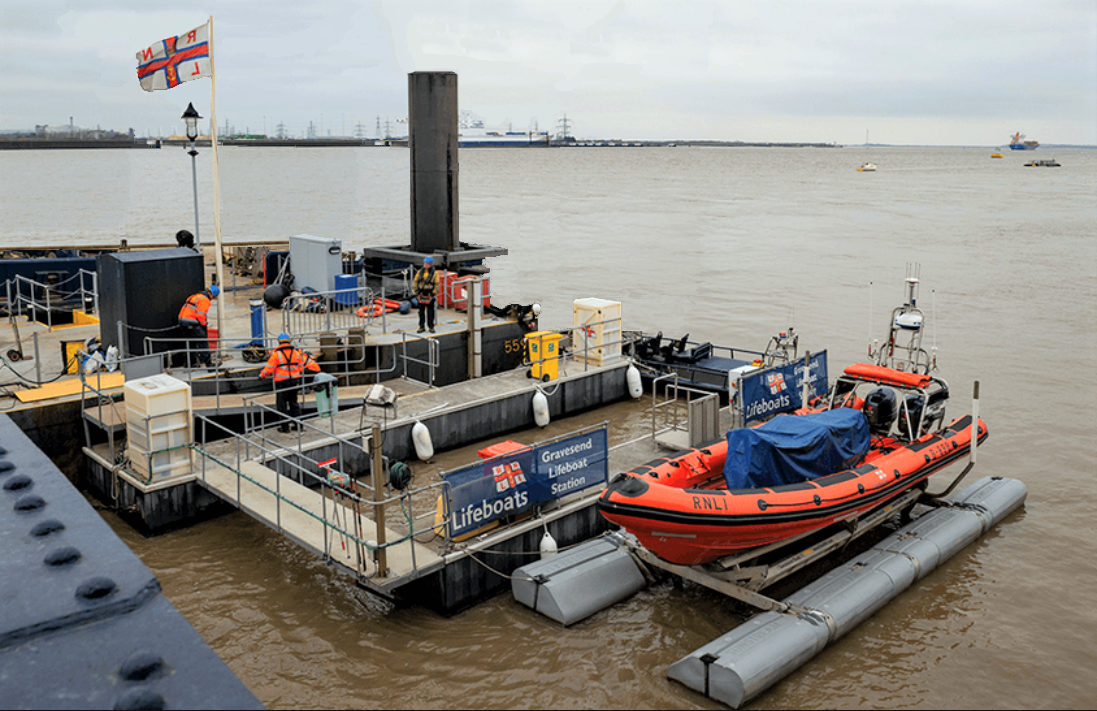
Olive Laura Deare II (B-827), on the Aquadock at Gravesend

Gravesend has one of the highest lifeboat call out rates in Kent, and is among the busiest stations in the British Isles. In the fifteen years to May 2017 its lifeboat launched 1,500 times, rescuing 797 people and saving 69 lives.

In 2008, a new B-class (Atlantic 85) Inshore lifeboat was put on service, and named Olive Laura Deare II (B-827). The second lifeboat on station was withdrawn. The original Olive Laura Deare (E-002) was transferred to the relief fleet until 2012, when she went on display at the RNLI Historic Lifeboat Collection at the Chatham Historic Dockyard.

== Crew ==
Since it was established in January 2002, the Gravesend station has been staffed 24 hours a day on a shift system, helping to meet the requirement to reach 90% of incidents within 15 minutes of receiving an alert. The crew is drawn from both full-time staff and a pool of volunteers.

== Gravesend lifeboats ==
| On Station | Op. No. (Note: Op. No. is the RNLI's Operational Number of the boat carried on the hull.) | Name | Model | Comments |
|---|---|---|---|---|
| 2002 | B-734 | Amy Constance | Atlantic 75 | |
| 2002–2004 | B-736 | Toshiba Wave Warrior | Atlantic 75 | |
| 2002–2008 | E-002 | Olive Laura Deare | E-class (Mark I) | On display at Chatham Historic Dockyard since 2012. |
| 2004 | B-734 | Amy Constance | Atlantic 75 | |
| 2005–2007 | B-705 | Vera Skilton | Atlantic 75 | |
| 2008 | B-732 | Elizabeth Ann | Atlantic 75 | |
| 2008 | B-715 | Phyllis | Atlantic 75 | |
| 2008–2009 | B-734 | Amy Constance | Atlantic 75 | |
| 2008– | B-827 | Olive Laura Deare II | Atlantic 85 | |

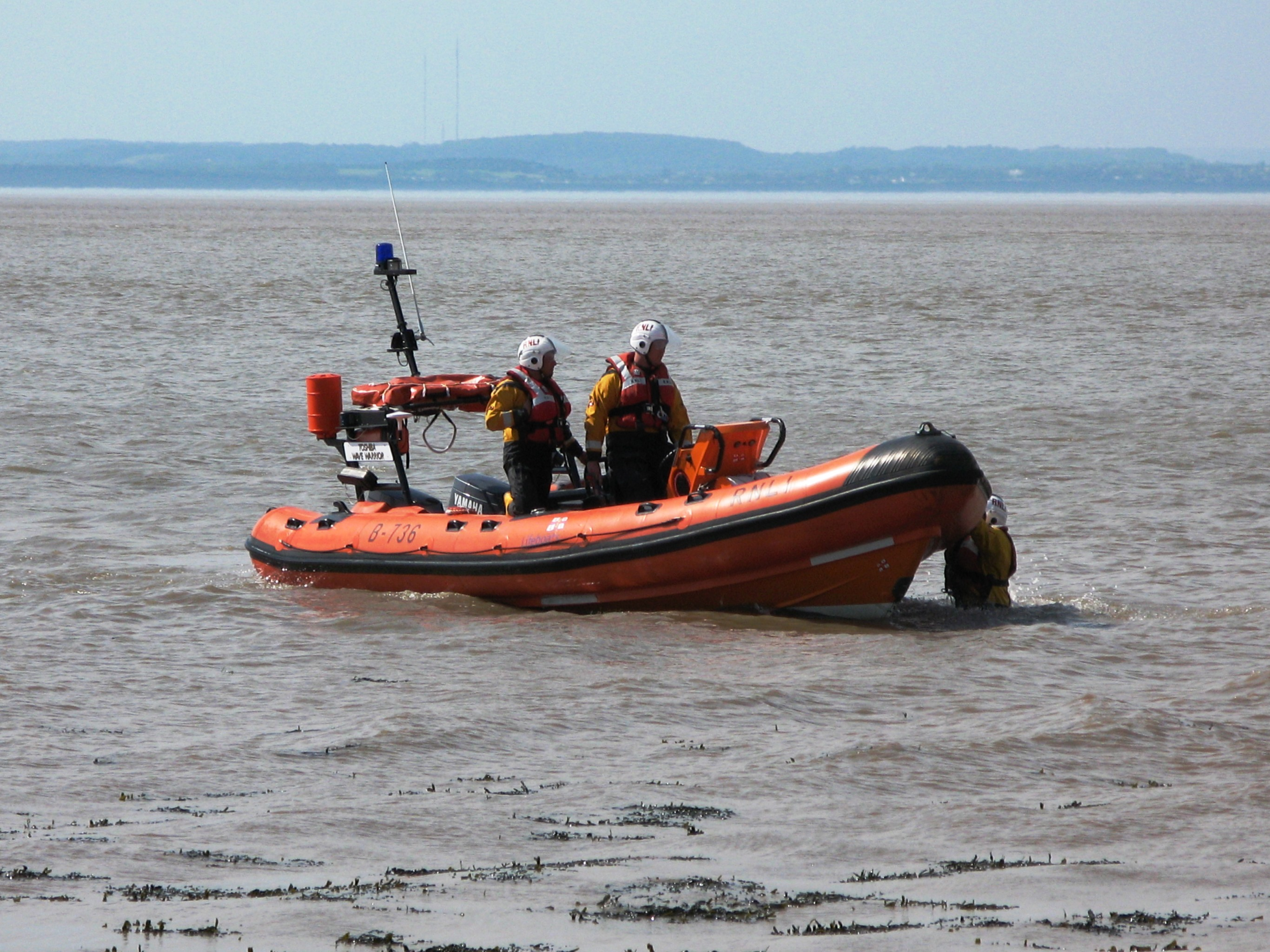
Toshiba Wave Warrior (B-736), (at Gravesend 2002–2004)

== See also ==
- List of RNLI stations
- List of former RNLI stations
- Royal National Lifeboat Institution lifeboats
