= Thames River Police =

Police force for the docks and wharfs of London (1800–1839)

Agency overview
- Formed: 1800
- Preceding agency: Marine Police (1798)
- Dissolved: 1839
- Superseding agency: Metropolitan Police Service

Jurisdictional structure
- Operations jurisdiction: River Thames and in its vicinity, England
- General nature: Local civilian police

The Thames River Police was formed in 1800 to tackle theft and looting from ships anchored in the Pool of London and in the lower reaches and docks of the Thames. It replaced the Marine Police, a police force established in 1798 by magistrate Patrick Colquhoun and justice of the peace John Harriott that had been part funded by the West India Committee to protect trade between the West Indies and London. It is claimed that the Thames River Police was England's first modern municipal police force.

The Thames River Police merged with the Metropolitan Police Service in 1839 with that nascent force instigated by Robert Peel. Its base was (and remains) in Wapping High Street. It has gradually evolved into the Marine Policing Unit.

== Marine Police ==
Where a 'police force' extends beyond organised constables of a single borough or city corporation this constitutes the oldest force in England. Merchants were losing an estimated £500,000 (equivalent to £54.3 million in 2025) of stolen cargo annually from the Pool of London on the River Thames by the late 1790s. A plan was devised to curb the problem in 1797 by an Essex justice of the peace and master mariner, John Harriot, who joined forces with Patrick Colquhoun and utilitarian philosopher, Jeremy Bentham. Armed with Harriot's proposal and Bentham's insights, Colquhoun was able to persuade the West India planters committees and the West India merchants to fund the new force. They agreed to a one-year trial and on 2 July 1798, after receiving government permission, the Thames River Police began operating with Colquhoun as superintending magistrate and Harriot the resident magistrate.

With the initial investment of £4,200, they took a lease of premises on the current site of Wapping Police Station and appointed a Superintendent of Ship Constables with five surveyors to patrol the river, day and night. These surveyors were rowed in open galleys by police watermen. They also had four surveyors visiting ships being loaded and unloaded, with ship constables (who were appointed and controlled by the Marine Police Force but paid for by ship owners) supervising gangs of dockers. A Surveyor of Quays with two assistants and thirty police quay guards watched over cargoes on shore.

The force policed 33,000 workers in the river trades, of whom Colquhoun claimed 11,000 were known criminals and "on the game". The river police first received a hostile reception by those dockyard and wharf workers not wishing to lose an illicit income. A mob of 2,000 attempted to burn down the police office with the police inside. The skirmish that followed resulted in the first line of duty death for the new force with the killing of Gabriel Franks. Nevertheless, Colquhoun reported to his backers that his force was a success after its first year, and his men had "established their worth by saving £122,000 worth of cargo and by the rescuing of several lives."

== Thames River Police ==
Word of the success of the Marine Police spread quickly. Colquhoun published a book on the Marine Police, Treatise on the Commerce and Police of the River Thames recommending a legislated fully government funded police force. The government passed the Depredations on the Thames Act 1800 (39 & 40 Geo. 3. c. 87) on 28 July 1800 establishing the Thames River Police together with new laws including police powers. The force was responsible for offences committed on the River Thames, and in its vicinity, within the counties of Middlesex, Surrey, Kent, Essex, and the City and Liberty of Westminster and Liberties of the Tower of London.

By 1829, the Thames River Police had expanded to occupy three stations at Wapping, Waterloo, and Blackwall. Ten years later, in 1839, it amalgamated with the Metropolitan Police Service, becoming the latter's Thames Division.

== Legacy ==
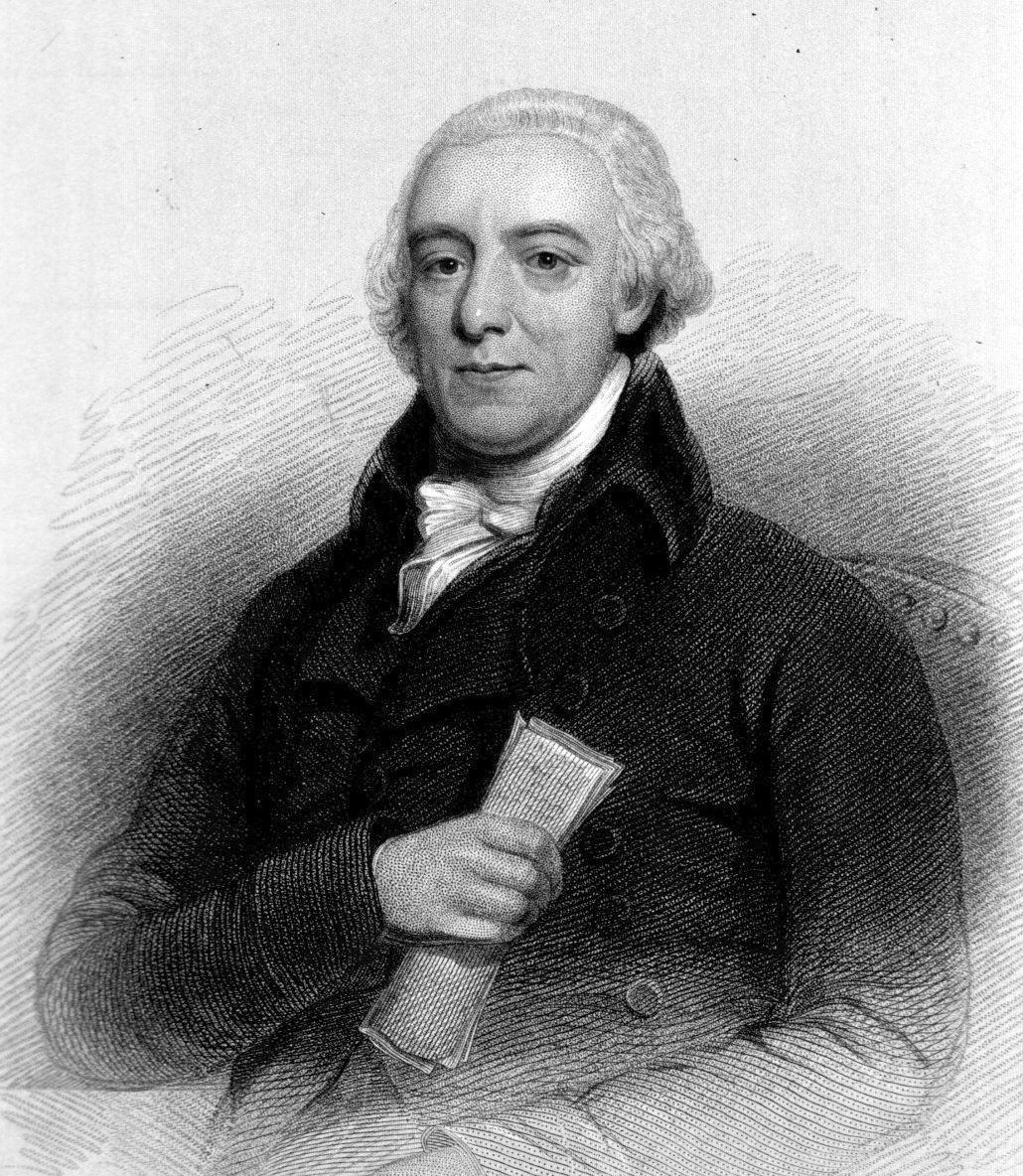
Patrick Colquhoun (1745–1820)

Historians of policing credit Colquhoun's innovation as a critical development leading up to Robert Peel's "new" police three decades later. Along with the Bow Street Runners, the Thames River Police was eventually absorbed by the Metropolitan Police in the 19th century. Colquhoun's utilitarian approach to the problem – using a cost-benefit analysis to obtain support from businesses standing to benefit – allowed him to achieve what Henry and John Fielding failed for their Bow Street detectives. Unlike the stipendiary system at Bow Street, the river police were full-time, salaried officers prohibited from taking fees.

The idea of a salaried police as it existed in France was considered an affront to the English ruling class who favoured ad hoc justice, particularly during this century of economic change. Britain was industrialising and expanding its Empire. Cautious of being seen as autocratic, many politicians felt the existing often sporadic local justice system with severe penalties should not be nationalised. Colquhoun made an economic rather than political case to show that a police dedicated to crime prevention was "perfectly congenial to the principle of the British constitution". Moreover, he went so far as to praise the French system, which had reached "the greatest degree of perfection".

As impressive as Colquhoun's ability to sell the idea of a publicly funded police force was, his main contribution is recognized as the introduction of crime prevention, or preventive policing, as a fundamental principle to the English police system. His police were to be a deterrent to crime by their permanent presence on the Thames. He arrived at this conclusion by viewing crime fighting as a science, and in utilitarian fashion, attempted to press that science into the service of the national economy. He published two dozen treatises on a variety of social problems, but the most significant is his 1797 A Treatise on the Police of the Metropolis.

The Metropolitan Police Service commemorated the founders with police vessel names including the supervision launches John Harriott (1947-1963) and Patrick Colquhoun (1963-2003), and Targa duty boats in use, the John Harriott and the Gabriel Franks.
