= Teddington Lifeboat Station =

RNLI Lifeboat station in west London, on the River Thames

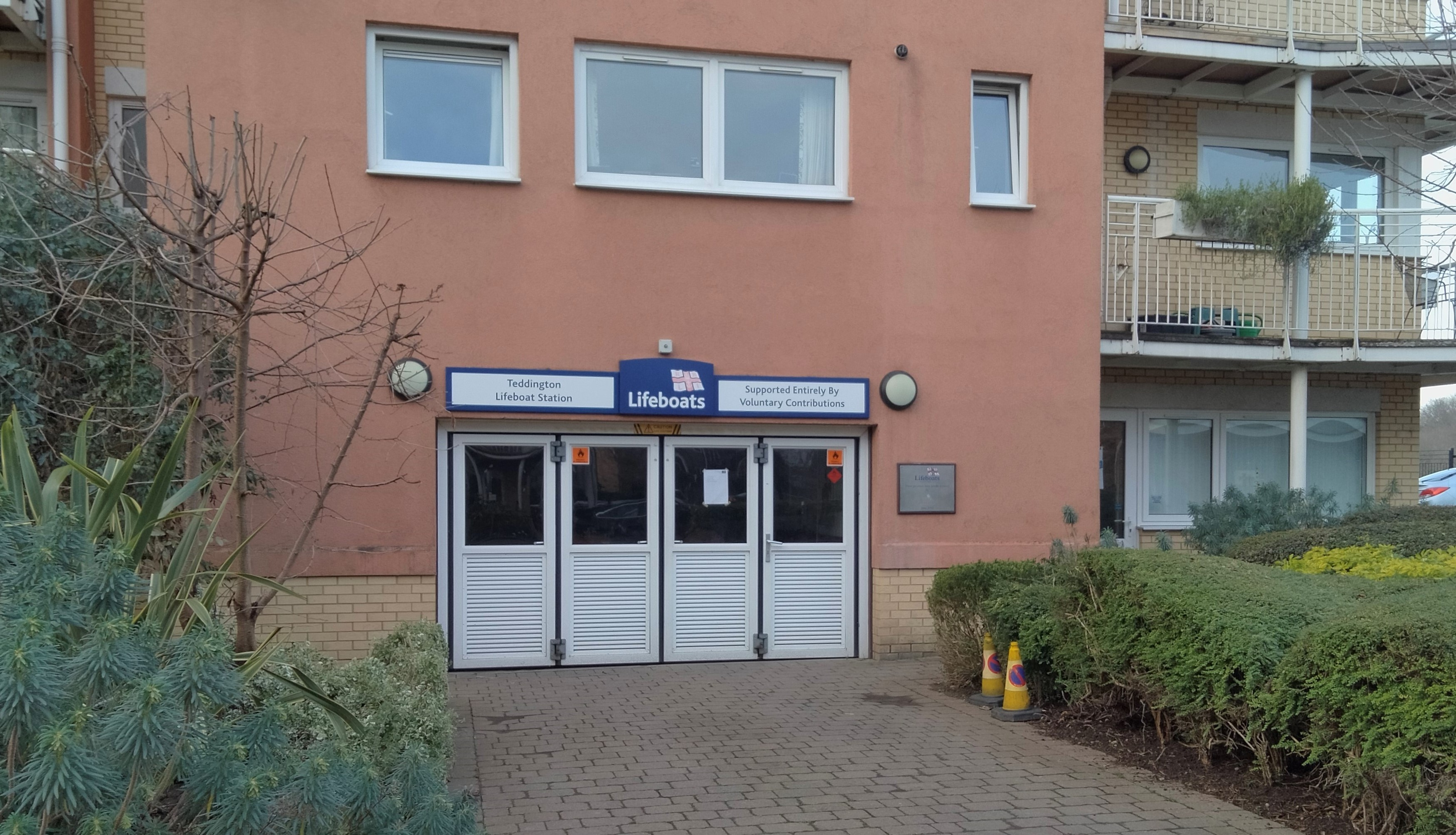
- Teddington Lifeboat Station

- Location within Greater London

General information
- Type: RNLI Lifeboat Station
- Location: Teddington Lifeboat Station, Fairmile House, Twickenham Road, Teddington, London Borough of Richmond upon Thames, England
- Coordinates: 51°25′51.24″N 0°19′33.24″W
- Opened: 2002
- Owner: Royal National Lifeboat Institution

Website
- Teddington RNLI Lifeboat Station

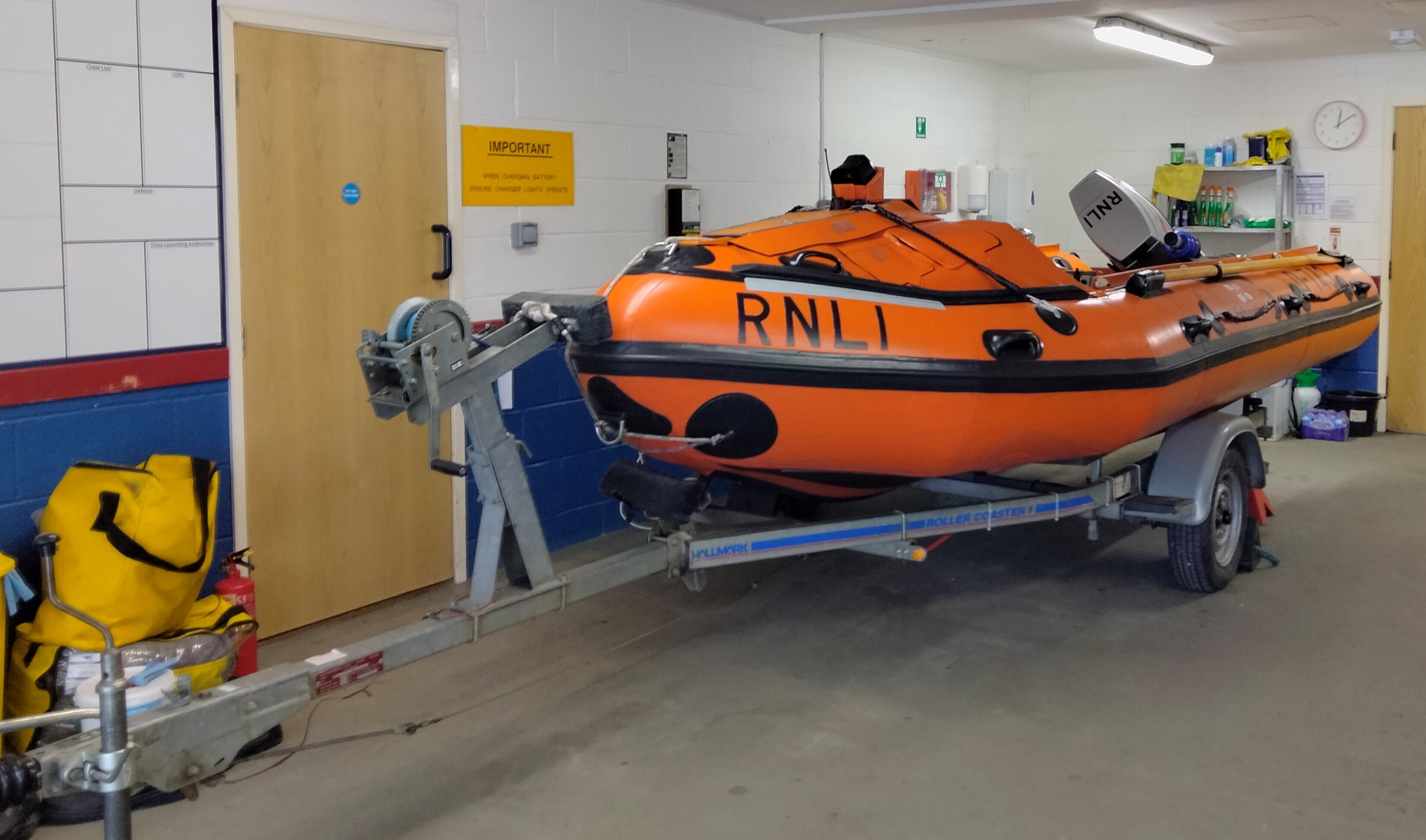
Lifeboat Olwen and Tom (D-743) at Teddington Lifeboat Station

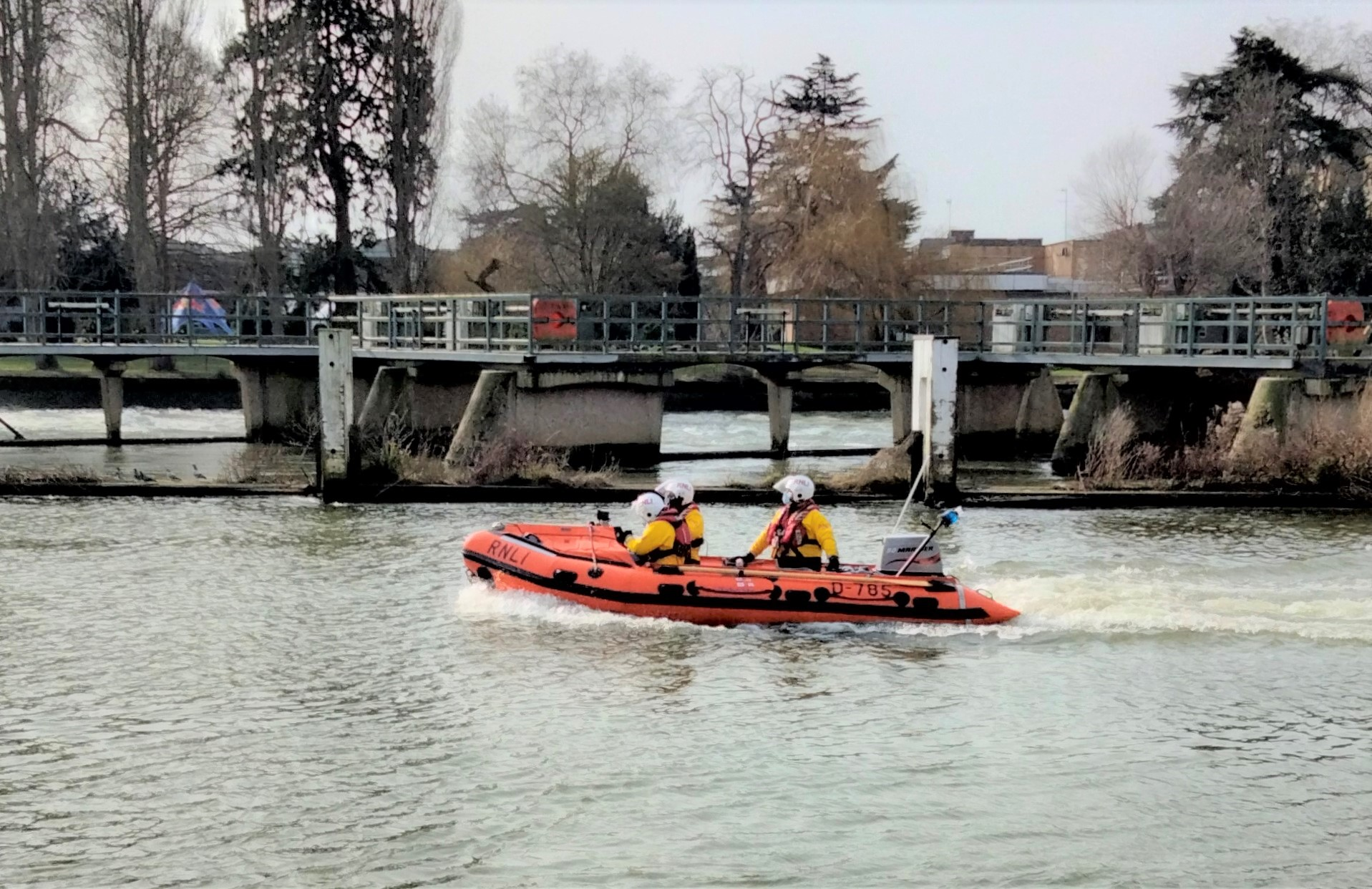
Lifeboat Peter Saw (D-785) at Teddington Lock

Teddington Lifeboat Station is located on the north bank of the River Thames at Fairmile House, on Twickenham Road in Teddington, next to Teddington Lock in West London.

It is one of four lifeboat stations established on the Thames in 2002, and is operated by the Royal National Lifeboat Institution (RNLI). It is notable for being one of the first stations to cover a stretch of river, rather than estuarial waters or the sea. Teddington Lock is the highest tidal point on the Thames, and the lifeboat station is situated to enable launch of the lifeboats both upstream and downstream of the lock.

The station currently operates two D-class (IB1) Inshore lifeboats, Peter Saw (D-785), on station since 2015, and Alderman Penny Shelton (D-874), on station since 2023.

== History ==
Following the collision in 1989 between the Marchioness and the dredger Bowbelle that resulted in the loss of 51 lives, the "Thames Safety Inquiry" recommended a centrally coordinated search and rescue presence on the Thames. The Maritime and Coastguard Agency (MCA) was chosen to coordinate the services that already existed on the Thames. Since they already had operational duties, they approached the RNLI and asked if they could provide a rescue service.

The RNLI recommended the creation of four lifeboat stations on the Thames to cover the tidal area between Teddington and the Channel, with locations approved at Teddington, Chiswick, Tower and Gravesend.

On 1 January 2002 Teddington lifeboat station became fully operational. It was thought that the lifeboat stations on the Thames would have to deal with approximately 50 call-outs per year. However, in the first year of operation, there were over 800 call-outs. In fact, the Thames lifeboat stations accounted for 10% of the total number of call-outs, or "shouts", that the RNLI responded to.

Although Teddington is not the busiest Thames station it was quickly realised that its presence should extend further upstream to Molesey Lock, thereby including Kingston upon Thames within its operational area. In order to deal with this additional area, and to ensure operational effectiveness above and below Teddington Lock, Teddington is equipped with two D-class lifeboats and, unlike the other Thames stations, is run on a purely voluntary basis.

== Crew ==
There are approximately 30 voluntary crew members, including engineers, bankers and designers, few members having any professional seafaring experience. They train every week in order to achieve the high standards of competence and safety expected of the RNLI.

In the event of a call-out, every crew member's pager is simultaneously activated by the London Coastguard. Twenty-four hours a day, 365 days of the year, the crew aim to launch one or both boats, depending on the nature of the incident, within six minutes of the call to the Coastguard. Their operational target is to be on scene within 15 minutes of the original call.

== Teddington lifeboats ==
=== Retired lifeboats ===
==== Pride of Nuneaton and Bedworth (D-477) ====
Pride of Nuneaton and Bedworth (D-477) was Teddington RNLI's first ever lifeboat and was the first operational boat for the station. The lifeboat was one of two funded from the Civic Appeal of the Mayor of the Borough of Nuneaton and Bedworth, councillor Bob Copland, which raised over £23.000. The lifeboat initially served in the RNLI relief fleet, and then at Kippford in Scotland. She entered service at the station's inception, having been used as a training craft whilst the station was being set up during 2001. Once the station became operational, she was the station's only boat until the arrival of Spirit of the Thames. She left Teddington after the arrival of Spirit of Mortimer and returned to the reserve fleet.

==== Spirit of the Thames (D-576) ====
This boat entered service at Teddington in June 2002. The boat was purchased from funds raised by Twickenham and Teddington fundraising branch. This boat was the last of the D-class (EA16) lifeboats to be built, before the introduction of the D-class (IB1). She was officially named Spirit of the Thames (D-576) in June 2003.

==== Spirit of Mortimer (D-648) ====
Spirit of Mortimer entered service at Teddington in May 2005, having made an appearance on the floor of the Barbican Arts Centre during the RNLI AGM. She was purchased from funds raised by the Mortimer RNLI branch, and was Teddington's first D-class (IB1). She left Teddington on the arrival of Peter Saw.

==== Olwen and Tom (D-743) ====
Olwen and Tom entered service at Teddington in December 2010. She was the gift of Peter and Hilary Saw, in memory of the latter's parents, Gwladys Olwen Martin and Thomas Frederick Shelton. She was formally named on 21 May 2011.

=== Active lifeboats ===
==== Peter Saw (D-785) ====
Peter Saw (D-785) entered service at Teddington in October 2015. She was a gift by Hilary Saw, in memory of her husband Peter Henry Saw. Since joining the station, she has been the main station boat and was formally named on 7 May 2016.

==== Alderman Penny Shelton (D-874) ====
The lifeboat was the third donated by local resident Hilary Saw, in memory of her sister Penny, who died in 2021. The lifeboat was namedAlderman Penny Shelton (D-874) on 2 August 2023.

=== List of Teddington lifeboats ===
Op. No. (Note: Op. No. is the RNLI's Operational Number of the boat carried on the hull.)	Name	On Station	Class	Comments
D-477	Pride of Nuneaton and Bedworth	2002–2010	D-class (EA16)	
D-576	Spirit of the Thames	2002–2010	D-class (EA16)	
D-648	Spirit of Mortimer	2005–2015	D-class (IB1)	
D-743	Olwen and Tom	2010–2023	D-class (IB1)	
D-785	Peter Saw	2015–	D-class (IB1)	
D-874	Alderman Penny Shelton	2023–	D-class (IB1)	

== See also ==
- List of RNLI stations
- List of former RNLI stations
- Royal National Lifeboat Institution lifeboats
