= Bilo =

Bilo may refer to:

- Bilo, Ethiopia, a town in central Ethiopia
- Bilo, Dobrich Province, a village in Bulgaria
- Bilo (Dimitrovgrad), a village in Serbia
- Bilo (music), a percussion instrument
- William C. Bilo (born 1944), United States Army Brigadier General
- Gabriela Biló (born 1989), Brazilian photojournalist
- Bilo Mountains (Bulgaria), a part of the Balkan Mountains in Sofia Province
- Saint Bilo, 5th-century Welsh Christian
- Bilo, Croatia, a village near Cetingrad
- Bilo, a Fijian name for a coconut shell cup

== See also ==
- BI-LO (disambiguation)
- Billo (disambiguation)
- Bilu (disambiguation)
- Bilo-bilo, a Filipino dessert
