= Bille =

Bille may refer to:

- Bille (given name)
- Bille (surname)
- Bille (Elbe), a river in Germany
- Billé, a French commune
- Bille (noble family), a Danish noble family
- Bille tribe, Ijaw tribe in Nigeria
- Bille (tetraeder) a monostable object able rolling to one side

== See also ==
- Billa (disambiguation)
