= Bilu =

Bilu may refer to:

== People ==
- Bilú (footballer, 1900-1965), Virgílio Pinto de Oliveira, Brazilian football manager and former centre-back
- Asher Bilu (born 1936), Australian artist
- Bilú (footballer, born 1974), Luciano Lopes de Souza, Brazilian football manager and former defensive midfielder
- Rafael Bilú, Brazilian football player
- Vidi Bilu (born 1959), Israeli film director
- Yoram Bilu, Israeli professor of anthropology

== Places ==
- Bilu, Baneh, Iran
- Bilu, Marivan, Iran
- Bilu Island, Myanmar
- Kfar Bilu, Israel
- Talmei Bilu, Israel

== Other ==
- Bilu (movement), Jewish movement

== See also ==
- Bilo (disambiguation)
