= Billo =

Billo may refer to:

- Bilo, Ethiopia, a plain and village in the Oromo-held lands of Ethiopia formerly spelled Billo or Billò
- Billo (film), a 1951 Pakistani Punjabi-language film
- Billo Barber, a 2008 Indian film
- Billo De Ghar, an album by Abrar Ul Haq
- Billo Frómeta, a Dominican musician
  - Billo, Grandes Éxitos (album), by Billo Frómeta
- a nickname for Bill O'Reilly (political commentator)
- a nickname for William Rees (rugby)
- MV Billo (1964), a dredger in service 1992–96

== See also ==
- Bilo (disambiguation)
- Billa (disambiguation)
