= Billa =

Billa may refer to:

== Films ==
- Billa (1980 film), 1980 Indian Tamil film starring Rajinikanth
- Billa (2007 film), 2007 Indian Tamil film starring Ajith Kumar, remake of Billa (1980)
  - Billa (soundtrack), soundtrack by Yuvan Shankar Raja for Billa (2007)
  - Billa II, a prequel to Billa (2007)
- Billa (2009 film), 2009 Indian Telugu film
- Billa (2015 film), 2015 Indian Kannada film

== People ==
- Billa Flint (1805–1894), Canadian businessman and politician
- Billa Harrod (1911-2005), British architectural conservationist
- Efstrat Billa (born 1980), Albanian footballer
- Nicole Billa (born 1996), Austrian footballer
- Ranga and Billa, perpetrators of the 1978 Geeta and Sanjay Chopra kidnapping case in Delhi, India

== Other uses ==
- Billa (character), fictional Indian gangster as featured in the Tamil films
- Bila, Ethiopia, formerly known as Billo and Billa, a village in western Ethiopia
- Billa, Lebanon, a village in the Bsharri District
- Billa, townland in the parish of Ballysadare, Co. Sligo, Ireland
- Billa (supermarket), a European supermarket chain
- Bille, a new 3-D geometrical form created 2025 in Budapest by Gergö Almádi & Gábor Domokos.

== See also ==
- Bille (disambiguation)
- Bili (disambiguation)
- Billo (disambiguation)
- Bila (disambiguation)
