= Bilu, Iran =

Bilu (Persian: بيلو) may refer to:

- Bilu, Baneh
- Bilu, Marivan
