= Louise Christian =

British human rights solicitor (born 1952)

Louise Hilda Christian (born 22 May 1952 in Oxford) is a British human rights solicitor. She is the daughter of Jack and Maureen Christian.

Christian was admitted to the Law Society as a solicitor on 16 January 1978. In 1985, she and Michael Fisher, a solicitor best known for his work representing those accused of Irish terrorist offences, whose firm, Fisher Meredith, she had worked in, set up a firm called Christian Fisher. An early case was representing 49 Liverpool councillors who were being prosecuted for wilful misconduct. The councillors were surcharged a total of £106,000; however, they appealed unsuccessfully to the high court, which awarded £242,000 legal costs against the councillors. Sadiq Khan (now Mayor of London) joined the firm as a trainee in 1994, and became a partner in 1997. The firm was renamed Christian Khan when Fisher left in 2002. Khan left in 2004; at the time the firm employed about 50 staff. Christian Khan earned money almost entirely from legal aid. Christian has represented detainees at the American Guantanamo Bay detention camp in Cuba. and the bereaved in various disasters – the Marchioness disaster, the Southall, Ladbroke Grove and Potters Bar Rail crashes and the Lakanal House fire. Christian left in 2010; and the firm merged with Imran Khan & Partners in 2012.

Christian has been prominent in far left politics, fighting Hendon South for Labour in 1987 (finishing third of three candidates, with 20.85% of the vote) before standing as a Socialist Alliance candidate in Hornsey and Wood Green in the 2001 election (coming fifth of seven candidates, with 2.5% of the vote). Louise Christian has long been associated with human rights' pressure group Liberty (formerly known as the National Council for Civil Liberties) and was the chair from July 2007 until October 2009. She has contributed to The Guardian, and is the author or co-author of several books.

== Publications ==
- Louise Christian; Joanna Glynn (1995). The law: freedom of expression and human rights advocacy in Turkey. KHRP.
- Leslie Thomas (barrister), Danny Friedman, Louise Christian (2002). Inquests: a practitioner's guide. Legal Action Group. ISBN 978-0-905099-97-2.
- Louise Christian (1983). Policing by coercion: the Police and Criminal Evidence Bill. Greater London Council. Police Committee Support Unit.
- Louise Christian; Joanna Glynn; Philip Kirkpatrick (1995). The European Convention under attack: the threat to lawyers in Turkey and ... International Bar Association. ISBN 978-1-85328-313-0.
