= Marchioness disaster =

Collision between two ships in London in 1989

Coordinates: 51.5088°N 0.0936°W

Marchioness, beached on the north bank of the River Thames after she was raised from the river bed

The Marchioness disaster was a collision between two vessels on the River Thames in London in the early hours of 20 August 1989, which resulted in the deaths of 51 people. The pleasure boat Marchioness sank after being hit twice by the dredger Bowbelle at about 1:46 am, between Cannon Street railway bridge and Southwark Bridge.

Marchioness had been hired for the evening for a birthday party and had about 130 people on board, four of whom were crew and bar staff. Both vessels were heading downstream, against the tide, Bowbelle travelling faster than the smaller vessel. Although the exact paths taken by the ships, and the precise series of events and their locations, are unknown, the subsequent inquiry considered it likely that Bowbelle struck Marchioness from the rear, causing the latter to turn to port, where she was hit again, then pushed along, turning over and being pushed under Bowbelle's bow. It took thirty seconds for Marchioness to sink; 24 bodies were found within the ship when it was raised.

An investigation by the Marine Accident Investigation Branch (MAIB) blamed a lack of lookouts, but their report was criticised by the families of the victims, as the MAIB had not interviewed anyone on Marchioness or Bowbelle, but relied on police interviews. The government refused to hold an inquiry, despite pressure from the families. Douglas Henderson, the captain of Bowbelle, was charged with failing to have an effective lookout on the vessel, but two cases against him ended with a hung jury. A private prosecution for manslaughter against four directors of South Coast Shipping Company, the owners of Bowbelle, and corporate manslaughter against the company was dismissed because of lack of evidence.

A formal inquiry in 2000 concluded that "The basic cause of the collision is clear. It was poor lookout on both vessels. Neither vessel saw the other in time to take action to avoid the collision." Criticism was also aimed at the owners of both ships, as well as the Department of Transport and the Port of London Authority. The collision and the subsequent reports led to increased safety measures on the Thames, and four new lifeboat stations were installed on the river.

== Background ==
=== Marchioness ===
The pleasure boat Marchioness was built in 1923 by the Salter Brothers of Oxford for Joseph Mears, a businessman whose interests included running pleasure launches on the River Thames. She was 85.5 ft (26.1 m) long and 14.5 ft (4.4 m) at the beam, and measured 46.19 gross tons. She spent most of her life on the Thames, including when she was requisitioned during the Second World War by the Thames Hospital Emergency Service, when she was stationed in Dagenham. Her service included being one of the little ships that aided in the 1940 Dunkirk evacuation. Marchioness was sold to Thames Launches in 1945, when Mears's company was wound up. She was purchased by Tidal Cruises Ltd in 1978 and the upper works were rebuilt to form an upper and lower saloon. The new upper saloon obstructed the vision from the wheelhouse, and there was, the later inquiry established, a lack of easily accessible emergency exits, particularly from the lower decks. Marchioness had seven life rafts—each of which could support twenty people—and seven lifebuoys—each of which could support two people. Registered in London, she was licensed to carry 165 passengers. From the early 1970s there was an increase in the number of boats for evening or night-time parties and discos, and Marchioness was part of this market.

Marchioness carried a crew of two: her captain was Stephen Faldo; the mate was Andrew McGowan. On the night of her sinking, she also carried two members of bar staff. Faldo and McGowan had a business partnership, Top Bar Enterprises, which provided the bar staff and drink for the party. Faldo was 29 at the time of the sinking. He had begun working on the Thames at the age of 17 and had earned his full waterman's river licence in June 1984. He began work at Tidal Cruises in 1986 and became the permanent captain of Marchioness in 1987. He had forgotten to renew his riverman's licence in the run-up to the night of the collision, and was technically not entitled to skipper the vessel that night. A later inquiry considered the lack of licence was "a minor point because he was undoubtedly qualified to do so and could have renewed his licence by paying 50 pence". McGowan, age 21, became an apprentice to a waterman in June 1986. By February 1988 he had completed courses at the Port of London Authority for chartwork and seamanship, and obtained his apprentice licence in May 1988; he joined Marchioness as a crew member around the same time.

=== Bowbelle ===
The aggregate dredger Bowbelle

The aggregate dredger Bowbelle was launched in 1964 by the Ailsa Shipbuilding Company of Troon, Scotland. She was 262 ft (79.9 m) long and 45 ft (13.8 m) at the beam; her deadweight tonnage was 1,850 long tons (1,880 t) and she measured 1,474.72 gross tons. Bowbelle was one of six "Bow" ships owned by East Coast Aggregates Limited; they were managed by South Coast Shipping Company Limited. (Note: Of the five other vessels, Bowbelle and Bowtrader regularly travelled along the upper Thames; a third vessel, Bowsprite, had previously navigated the same waters, but sank in July 1988.) East Coast Aggregates Limited (ECA) was part of the larger RMC Group, a concrete products company. Bowbelle had a crew of nine: a master, two mates, three engineers, two able seamen and a cook. The ship's captain, Douglas Henderson, aged 31, undertook a Deep Sea apprenticeship until 1978 and joined ECA in November 1987, when he became second mate on Bowsprite. In May 1989 he became the master of Bowbelle.

Vessels from ECA, including Bowbelle, had previously been involved in accidents on the Thames. In July 1981 there was a collision between Bowtrader and the passenger launch Pride of Greenwich; three months later Bowtrader was involved in a collision with Hurlingham, another pleasure cruiser owned by Tidal Cruises. Bowbelle collided with Cannon Street railway bridge in May 1982 and, the following month, was nearly in a collision with a passenger boat.

At the time of the collision with Marchioness, Bowbelle was in ballast (having discharged her aggregate cargo) and was trimmed down at the stern; (Note: A vessel's trim is the difference between the draughts fore and aft. Bowbelle was trimmed down at the stern, which meant the bow was higher, thus reducing the forward visibility.) this, along with the dredging equipment, limited the forward vision from the bridge. On 19 August 1989 Henderson visited several public houses over a period of three and a half hours and drank six pints (3.4 L; 120 imp fl oz) of lager. He returned to the ship at 6:00 pm for food and a short sleep; one of the ship's company, Terence Blayney, who acted as the forward lookout that night, was with Henderson, and drank seven pints over the same period.

=== Jonathan Phang and Antonio de Vasconcellos ===
Marchioness was hired for a party for the night of 19–20 August 1989. It was organised by Jonathan Phang, a photographic agent, to celebrate the 26th birthday of Antonio de Vasconcellos, who worked in a merchant bank. The pair were good friends and business partners in a photographic agency. Phang paid £695 to hire the boat from 1:00 am to 6:00 am, with extra for the hire of the disco, food and drinks. Many of those at the party were also in their twenties; some were former students and others worked in fashion, journalism, modelling and finance. (Note: £695 in 1989 equates to approximately equivalent to £1,800 in 2025, according to calculations based on Consumer Price Index measure of inflation.) The plan was for Marchioness to go downriver from the Embankment Pier near Charing Cross railway station to Tower Bridge, then back to Charing Cross to land some of the passengers. Marchioness would then travel down to Greenwich before returning again to Charing Cross, arriving back at 5:45 am.

== 20 August 1989 ==
=== 0:00 am – 7:00 am ===
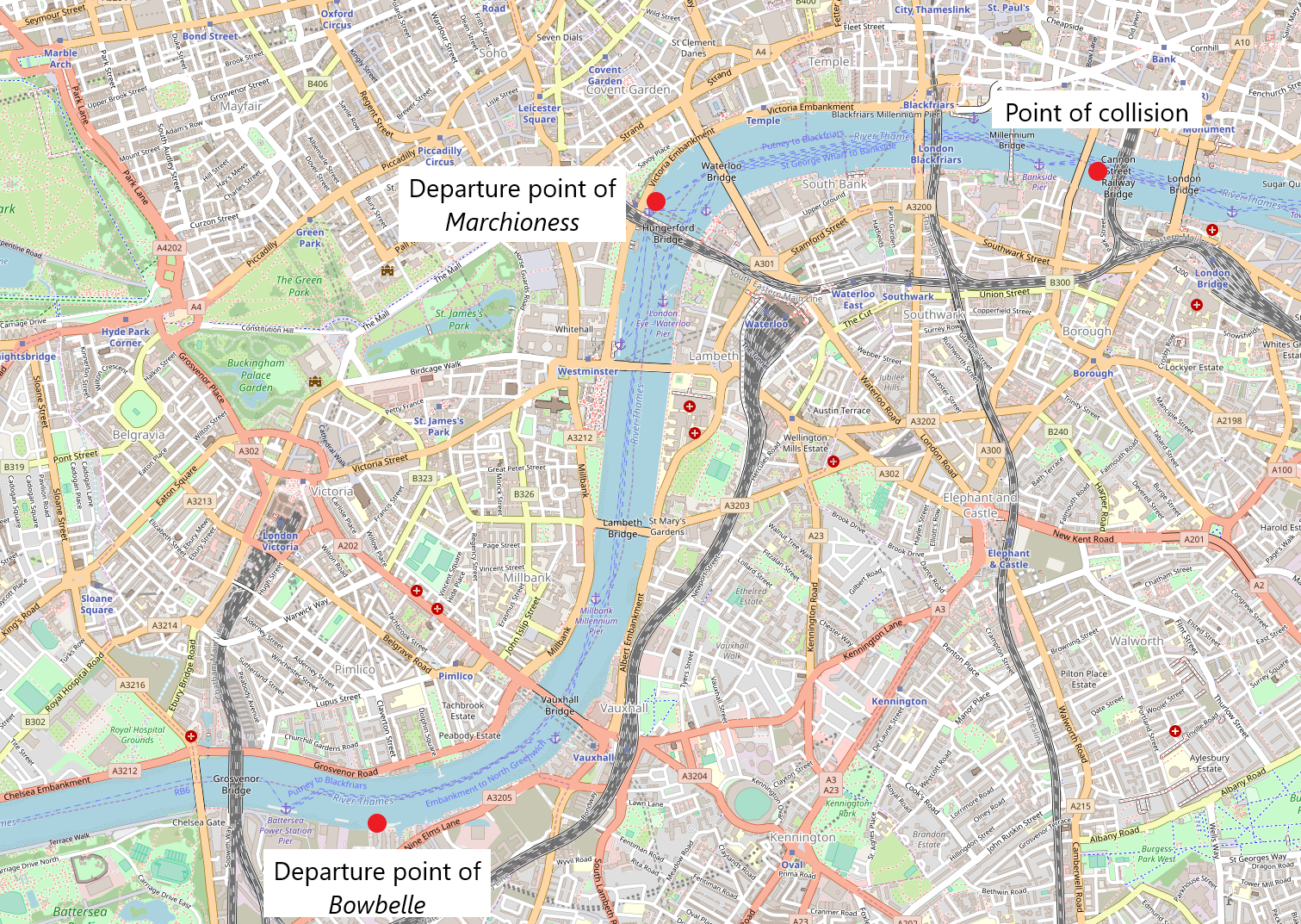
Map of routes and points

The night of 19–20 August 1989 was a clear one; it was three days after the full moon and there was good visibility. There was a negligible wind. It was a spring tide, recorded as one of the highest of the year and the river was at half-tide at the time of the collision; it was running upriver at a rate of three knots. There are several versions of the paths taken by the vessels in the approach to Southwark Bridge and beyond, and no agreement on the point when the two ships collided. (Note: Positions given by eye-witnesses vary from west of Southwark Bridge to near Cannon Street Bridge, although the weight of reports put the collision between the two bridges, in the middle of the river.) Much of the evidence gathered in later investigations was inconsistent and any descriptions of the actions of the ships are based on average speeds and likely positions.

At 1:12 am Bowbelle left her berth at the Nine Elms pier near Battersea Power Station and radioed her move by VHF radio to Thames Navigation Service (TNS), based in Woolwich. She reported passing Vauxhall Bridge at 1:20 am and Waterloo Bridge at 1:35 am. In accordance with the usual procedure, TNS radioed all river traffic at 1:15 am and 1:45 am, advising them of Bowbelle's downstream passage. Bowbelle's average speed was about 5.5 knots (6.3 mph; 10.2 km/h) over the ground. (Note: 5.5 knots over the ground, against a tide of 3 knots (3.5 mph; 5.6 km/h), equates to a speed of 8.5 knots (9.8 mph; 15.7 km/h) through the water.)

Marchioness was supposed to leave Embankment Pier at 1:00 am, but was delayed until 1:25 am. No count was made of the number of passengers, but the accepted number on board is either 130 or 131. Faldo was in the wheelhouse, where he stayed until the collision. Heading downriver, just before Blackfriars Bridge, Marchioness passed her sister pleasure cruiser Hurlingham—which was also hosting a disco that night, and was also heading in the same direction. Marchioness's average speed was about 3.2 knots (3.7 mph; 5.9 km/h) over the ground. (Note: 3.2 knots over the ground, against a tide of 3 knots (3.5 mph; 5.6 km/h), equates to a speed of 6.5 knots (7.5 mph; 12.0 km/h) through the water.) She passed through the central arch of Blackfriars Bridge; at this point she was about 1/2 mile (0.80 km) in front of Bowbelle. At some point after Blackfriars Bridge, Bowbelle overtook Hurlingham and steered for the central arch of Southwark Bridge. Marchioness also went through the central arch, but probably towards the southern side.

The port side of Marchioness, showing the point of the second impact from Bowbelle. The wooden planking on top was the floor of the upper saloon, which was ripped off by Bowbelle's anchor.

When Bowbelle was within 160 feet (50 m) of Marchioness, the smaller vessel was affected by the forces of interaction—the water being pushed ahead of the large ship. At about 1:46 am, just after Marchioness passed under Southwark Bridge, she was hit twice by Bowbelle's bow. The first impact was 20 feet (6.1 m) from Marchioness's stern, which had the effect of turning the smaller vessel to port. The second impact was 33 feet (10 m) from the stern, and caused the pleasure boat to pivot round the bow of Bowbelle, and turn it on its side, probably to an angle of 120°. The upper superstructure of Marchioness was ripped off by Bowbelle's anchor. The lower saloon was quickly flooded and the lights went out. The weight and momentum of Bowbelle pushed Marchioness underwater and she sank, stern first, within 30 seconds of being hit. McGowan had been thrown from the boat into the water, but climbed back on board to tie open the port side door, which led to the dance floor, to allow several people to escape. One eyewitness to the crash, Keith Fawkes-Underwood, who viewed the incident from the south bank of the Thames, reported:

The barge collided with the pleasure boat hitting it in about its centre then mounted it, pushing it under the water like a toy boat. Within a matter of about 20 seconds the pleasure boat had totally disappeared underneath the water.

Of the 130 people on board Marchioness, 79 survived and 51 died. The dead included de Vasconcellos and Faldo. (Note: The youngest victim was 19-year-old ballerina Francesca Dallaglio, the sister of the former England rugby captain Lawrence. Faldo's son, Jeff Brazier, appeared in reality television programmes, and was married to the Big Brother contestant Jade Goody.) No-one on Bowbelle was injured. Marchioness sank so quickly that most people were unable to locate or use the life rafts, buoys or jackets. Survival of those on Marchioness depended partly on their location within the vessel. There were 41 people known to have been on the forward deck and wheelhouse, of whom 9 died and 32 survived, a survival rate of 78%. Of the 13 people known to have been in the lower saloon, 9 died and 4 survived (a 31% survival rate). One of those from the lower saloon who survived was Iain Philpott, who said in his statement to the police:

I remember turning around to head towards the windows to escape the boat, the water started coming in the boat through the window, I knew at this point the boat was going to go down. Within a matter of seconds the general lights went out, everything was in darkness ... I was then thrown forward by a wall of water, the whole boat filled with water instantly ... When I surfaced I was some distance away from the Marchioness which was partly submerged.

Hurlingham was between 45 and 60 metres (150–200 ft) away from the collision, and those on board were in the best position to be eyewitnesses. George Williams, the vessel's captain, put out a call on VHF radio to the Thames Division of the Metropolitan Police Service, based in Wapping: "Woolwich Police, Wapping Police, Wapping Police, Emergency, pleasure boat is sunk, Cannon Street Railway Bridge, all emergency aid please". The call was also picked up by the TNS, who misheard the location as Battersea Bridge; Thames Division only heard part of the call, so TNS informed them that the police should be in attendance at Battersea Bridge.

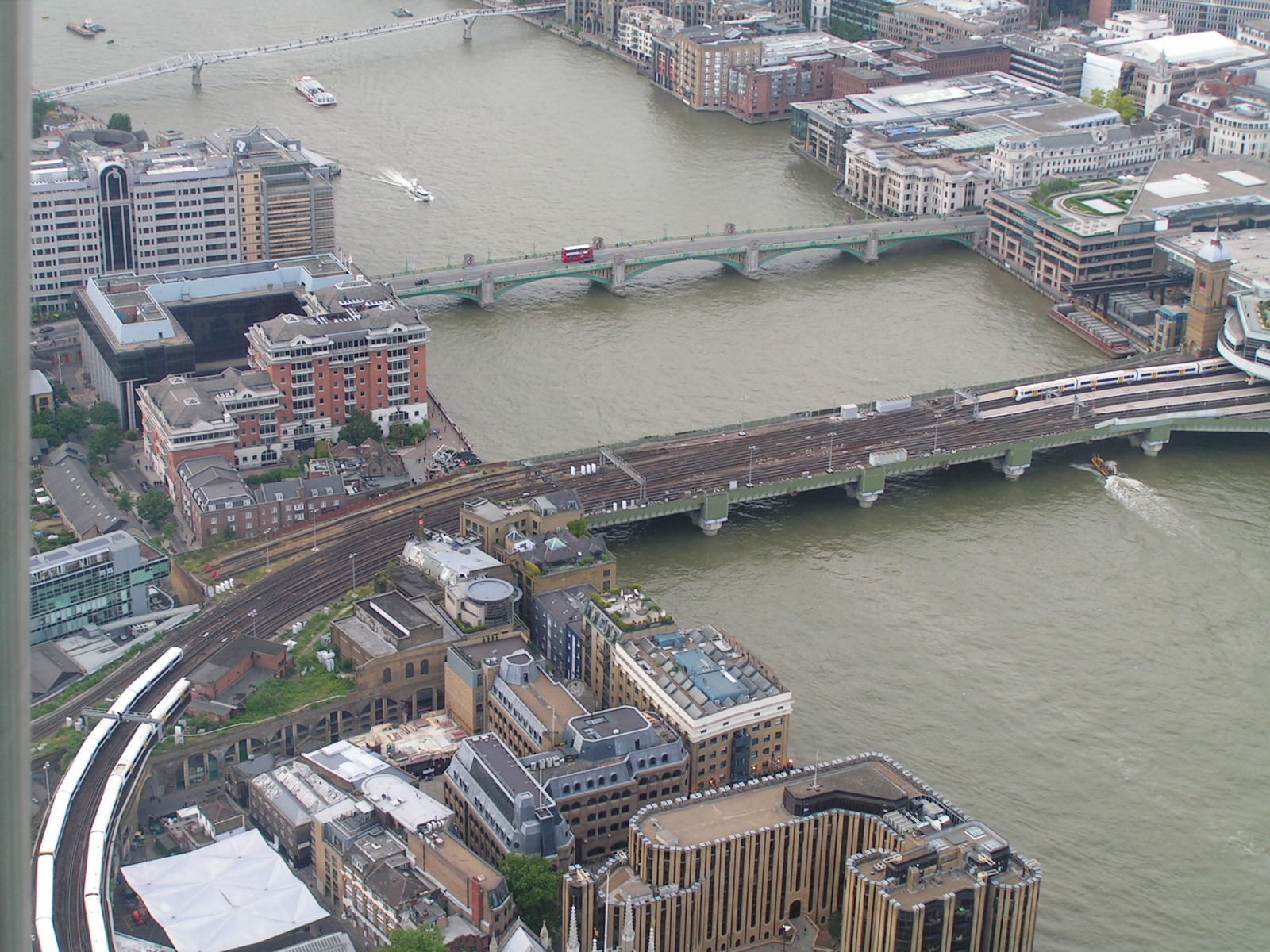
Aerial view, from the south bank, of Cannon Street Railway Bridge (nearest to the camera) and Southwark Bridge. The Millennium Bridge, visible at the top of the picture, was not yet built at the time of the crash.

After colliding with Marchioness, Bowbelle hit one of the piers of Cannon Street Bridge, and radioed TNS at 1:48 am to correct the inaccurate reference to Battersea Bridge; at 1:49 am Henderson reported to TNS:

I have to get underway now and proceed out through bridges. I believe I have struck a pleasure craft. It has sunk. I am getting clear of the bridges now. I was distracted by flashing lights from another pleasure craft. My vessel was proceeding outward bound just approaching Cannon Street bridge and, well, I just lost steerage, um and I don't know after that, I can't really say anything else sir. Over.

After the radio transmission, Bowbelle travelled downstream to Gallions Reach, where she dropped anchor. Her crew did not deploy the ship's lifebuoys, flotation devices or lifeboat and she did not take part in the attempts to rescue survivors. All ships in the area were instructed to go to the area to assist with the rescue. Hurlingham was already on the scene, and the passengers and crew threw lifebuoys and buoyancy aids to those in the water. Many of those from Marchioness were swept into driftwood collection cages, and Hurlingham picked up several survivors—the passengers climbing out onto the cages to help people out of the water. The vessel then dropped all passengers and 28 survivors at the nearby Waterloo Police Pier (now Tower Lifeboat Station) before it took members of the emergency services back out to the collision site. Waterloo Police Pier was used as the landing point for all casualties and the first responders from the emergency services set up a treatment and processing point there. Police launches rescued more than half the survivors from the river; some reached the river bank themselves.

Less than half an hour after Marchioness was hit, a major incident was declared with an incident room at New Scotland Yard. The police's body recovery team were also deployed, and the first body arrived at Wapping Police Station—where the Thames Division were based—at 6:50 am. The station acted as a holding area for bodies before they were taken to the mortuary in Westminster.

=== 7:00 am – 0:00 am ===
Margaret Thatcher, the Prime Minister, returned home early from her holiday in Austria to be briefed by Michael Portillo, the Minister of State for Transport. His senior in the department, the Secretary of State for Transport Cecil Parkinson, also returned home early in response. Portillo announced that an investigation would be made by the Marine Accident Investigation Branch (MAIB), but that no decision had yet been made as to whether to hold a public inquiry. Within 24 hours of the collision, the decision was made that there would be no public inquiry, and that the MAIB investigation would be sufficient.

A Port of London (PLA) hydrographic surveyor located the wreckage of Marchioness and, during the late afternoon of 20 August, work began on lifting the vessel. The bodies of 24 party-goers were found on board, 12 of them in the lower saloon. The wreckage was moored against the north bank of the Thames.

While the lifting operation was progressing, police arrested and interviewed Henderson and Kenneth Noble, Bowbelle's second mate who was at the wheel for the collision. Both men were breathalysed; the police announced soon afterwards that alcohol was not a cause of the collision.

== Inquests and inquiries ==
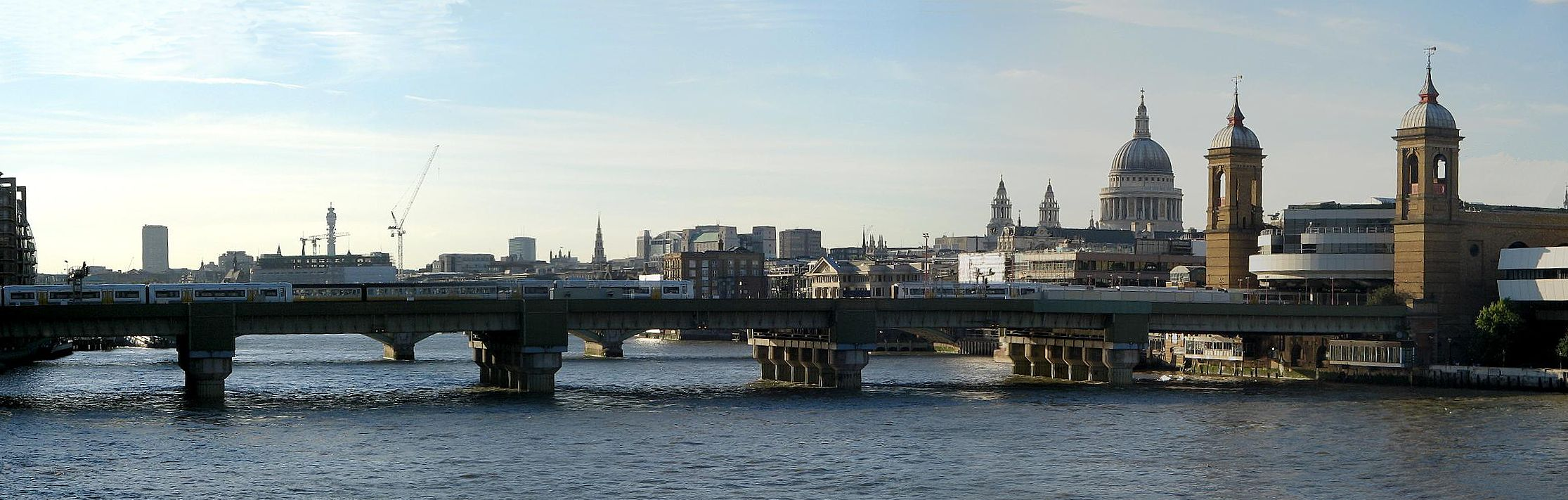
Looking upstream to Cannon Street railway bridge, scene of the disaster

=== 1989 to 1997 ===
On the day following the collision Paul Knapman, the coroner for the City of Westminster, opened and adjourned the inquest into the deaths. In the days after the collision, bodies were still being found and recovered from the water. (Note: Most bodies were recovered between 20 and 23 August. The last body to be recovered was that of de Vasconcellos, which was located on 1 September.) To help with the identification process, Knapman opted to use several methods, including dental records, identification of personal items and clothing descriptions from descriptions provided by the families, and fingerprints. As part of their approach, Knapman decided that:

With those bodies which were not recovered from the Marchioness and which would be likely to surface only when putrification and bloating meant that they would float, the following would apply:

a. Visual identification would be unreliable, perhaps impossible, and cause distress for relatives so that it should not be used: and

b. In circumstances where it was impossible to take adequate fingerprints from the bodies without removing the hands of those bodies to the Fingerprint Laboratory, those hands should be removed.

During the post-mortem examinations, 25 pairs of hands were removed; no written records were kept of the removal. No guidelines were issued over which hands should be removed and no individual was given responsibility for making the decision. The majority were identified through other means—visual identification of the face, or through identification of clothing or personal items, and only four of the victims were identified through their fingerprints. Families of the victims later complained that they were not told in a timely fashion that bodies had been recovered, that some were denied access to view the bodies of their relatives, (Note: Margaret Lockwood-Croft, the mother of one of the victims, was later shown police photographs of some of the victims: in her opinion the bodies were still acceptable to be viewed and had not decomposed too far to make recognition difficult.) and were not told of the processes that would be used—including that the hands would be removed. One family was shown the body of the wrong person, then given the right body, but without the hands; these were sent on later with apologies, and a request not to tell other parents about the need to remove them as this was a 'one-off' mistake. (Note: The hands of one of the victims were lost by the coroner's office, and only found four years later, wrapped in plastic at the back of a fridge.)

On 24 August Marchioness was taken from her mooring near Southwark Bridge, and towed downstream to Greenwich, where she was broken up.

The MAIB issued an interim report towards the end of August, with recommendations as to increasing safety on the Thames. These included a requirement that vessels over 130 ft (40 m) had to have a forward lookout in contact with the bridge by radio, and tighter controls on the passage of vessels along the upper Thames. Their investigation continued with a reconstruction of the events on the night of 16–17 September; Bowbelle took part, and a PLA launch was used as a stand-in for Marchioness. This was later criticised by Brian Toft, a disaster and risk-management expert commissioned by the Marchioness Action Group (MAG), as being unsatisfactory. Toft identified that there were several problems, including no second pleasure cruiser, no fare-paying passengers and no disco lights or music included in the re-enactment.

In October 1989 the companies behind Bowbelle and Marchioness agreed to pay up to £6 million in compensation to the families of the victims, without either company admitting any liability for the crash. The sum offered was under a calderbank condition that the offer stood to be withdrawn if a judge awarded a lower amount. A week later a report was compiled for Allan Green, the Director of Public Prosecutions (DPP), which recommended that criminal charges should not be brought against Henderson.

That December, Knapman met the DPP to discuss the progress of the inquests. Green agreed that the first part of the inquest should go ahead—dealing with the causes of death—irrespective of the other investigations of the police and the possibility of later criminal charges. A second part of the inquest—establishing the responsibility of the crash and making safety recommendations—would be discussed at a later stage. When Knapman re-opened the inquest on 23 April 1990, he was critical of the DPP for taking eight months to decide on whether to bring criminal charges against anyone, which meant that a full inquest could not take place in case it prejudiced any future trial. The inquest was, in effect, a series of what the legal scholar Hazel Hartley calls "mini inquests", one each for each of the 51 bodies.

On 26 April the DPP stepped in to stop the inquest, stating that charges would now be brought against Henderson. Because of his decision to stop the inquest, the information on how the collision occurred, who was to blame or what could be done to ensure it could not be repeated, was not considered. Henderson was charged under the Merchant Shipping Act 1988 for failing to have an effective lookout on the vessel. The case against him opened on 4 April 1991 at the Old Bailey and ran to 14 April. The jury failed to reach a decision; the DPP decided that a retrial would be in the public interest. This took place between 17 and 31 July the same year; it again ended with a hung jury.

At the end of July 1991 Ivor Glogg, the husband of one of the victims, began a private prosecution for manslaughter against four directors of South Coast Shipping Company, the owners of Bowbelle, and corporate manslaughter against the South Coast Shipping Company. Two weeks later the Transport Secretary, Malcolm Rifkind, took the decision to publish the MAIB Report, repeating that because an appropriate body had undertaken an investigation, there was no requirement to have a public inquiry. Families of the victims were angry with the move, pointing out that Rifkind had delayed publication of the report on the basis that publication could prejudice the case against Henderson, but that the publication could now jeopardise Glogg's private prosecution. The DPP demanded that Glogg hand over the papers for the case, stating he would take it over, then drop it; Glogg refused to comply, stating that it was out of the remit of the DPP, and that it was for a magistrates' court to decide if the case was adequate. The DPP withdrew and allowed Glogg's case to proceed. The case was dismissed after the magistrate stated that there was insufficient evidence.

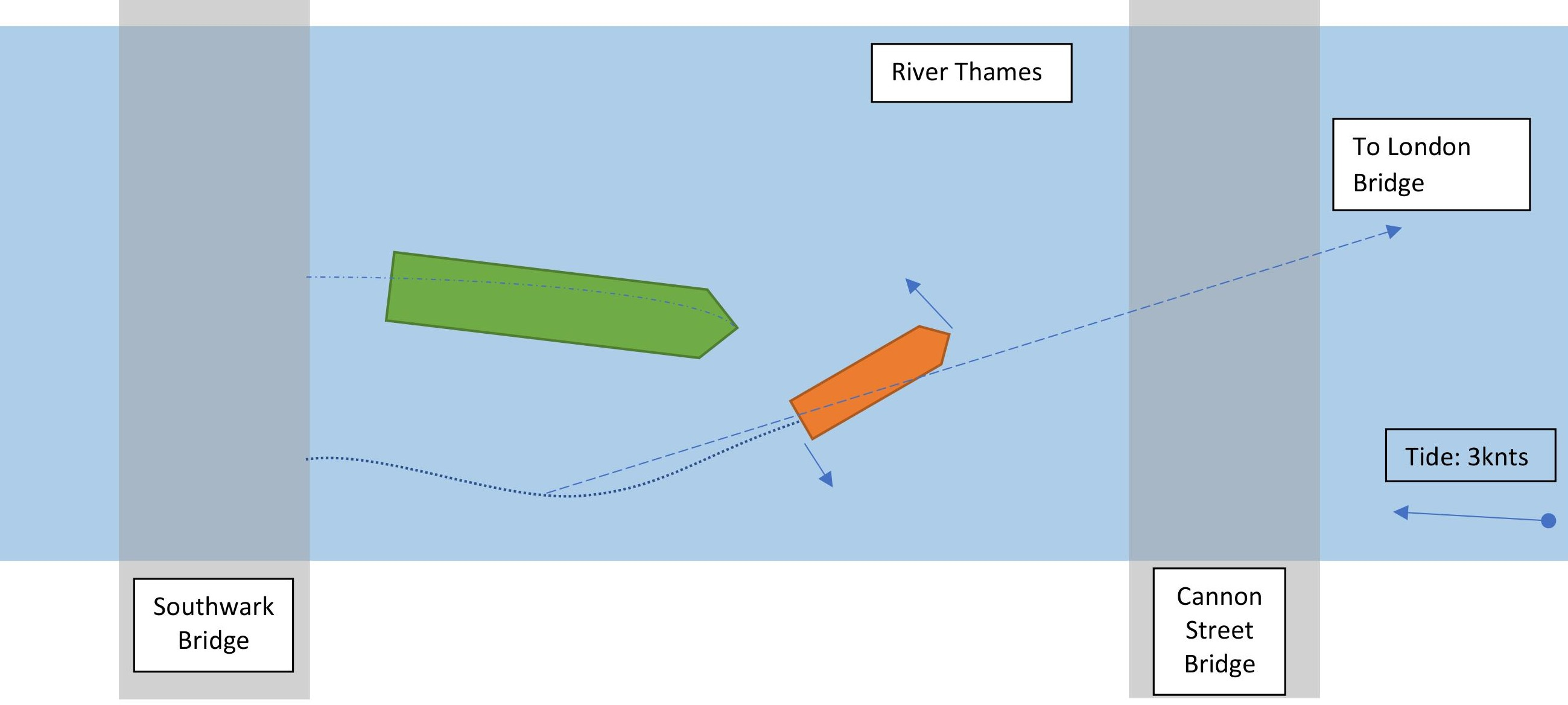
Simplified version of the incident, according to the Marine Accident Investigation Branch investigation. (Not to scale)

The MAIB report considered that Marchioness had altered her course to port, which put her in line with Bowbelle's path. The report concluded that:

18.3 ... no one in either vessel was aware of the other's presence until very shortly before the collision. No one on the bridge of BOWBELLE was aware of MARCHIONESS until the collision occurred.

The immediate cause of the casualty was therefore failure of look-out in each vessel.

18.4 The principal contributory factors were that:

visibility from the wheelhouse of each vessel was seriously restricted;

both vessels were using the middle part of the fairway and the centre arches of the bridges across the river;

clear instructions were not given to the forward look-out in BOWBELLE.

The families of the victims criticised the MAIB report. They pointed out that the investigation had not directly interviewed anyone on Marchioness or Bowbelle, but relied on the police interviews; they stated that there were errors in methodology, approach and fact within the report. Toft provided a critique of the MAIB's work and concluded that:

The inconsistencies, contradictions, confusions, conjecture, erroneous conclusions, missing and inappropriate recommendations as well as epistemological, ontological and methodological problems, created by the then current maritime safety culture ... raises serious doubts as to the objectivity of the investigation, the validity of the findings, the judgement of the Department of Transport in holding an inquiry of this type, and as a result whether or not all the appropriate lessons were uncovered during the MAIB's inquiry into this tragedy.

The report was handed to Rifkind, who again declined to open a public inquiry, but commissioned a private one—the Hayes Report, published in July 1992—that looked at health and safety on the Thames, rather than the sinking of Marchioness. (Note: The Hayes Report was written by John Hayes, the secretary general of the Law Society.)

In 1992 the families of the victims became aware that the hands had been removed from many of the bodies. In March that year an account in The Mail on Sunday, "Cover up!", was published; (Note: The article was Wigmore, Bill; Allen, Denna (22 March 1992). "Cover Up! An Awful Truth Brings New Grief to the Mother of a Marchioness Victim". The Mail on Sunday. p. 8.) when Knapman met the two journalists to deny the accusation of a cover-up, he advised them not to base reports on what Margaret Lockwood-Croft, the mother of one of the victims, said: he described her as "unhinged". He also showed them photographs of the victims, without discussing the matter with the families. In July, Knapman informed the families that the inquests—suspended since April 1990 because of the case against Henderson—would not be recommenced. The families tried to apply for a judicial review on the basis that "the use of the word 'unhinged' and reference to a number of 'mentally unwell' relatives betrayed an attitude of hostility, however unconscious, towards ... members of the Marchioness Action Group". Initially turned down by High Court, the Court of Appeal then found in favour of the group to allow an appeal. In June 1994 Knapman and his assistant were stood down and replaced by another coroner, John Burton. He was initially dismissive of the concerns of the MAG, accused their solicitor of trying to mislead the Court of Appeal and indicated that he was inclined not to grant any further inquests. Burton was told that another judicial review would be applied for if he refused to hold the inquests, and he subsequently announced that they would go ahead.

The resumed inquest took place in March and April 1995. When questioned about the MAIB report, Captain James de Coverley—one of the report's authors—withdrew the suggestion that Marchioness had steered to port in the last moments before the crash, saying it had never been his intention that the text could be understood that way. In summing up, Burton instructed the coroner's jury that a verdict of unlawful killing could not be applied to anyone who had already been cleared by a court. The jury retired for four hours and returned a verdict of unlawful killing. Burton asked them "Did you understand my Direction?", but the decision stood.

=== 1997 to 2001 ===
Following the 1997 election, which brought the Labour Party to power, the MAG petitioned John Prescott, the Secretary of State for the Environment, Transport and the Regions and Deputy Prime Minister, to open an inquest. In August 1999 he instructed Lord Justice Clarke to undertake a non-statutory inquiry into safety on the Thames. Clarke reported in February 2000, concluding:

I was asked to advise

whether there is a case for a further investigation or inquiry into the circumstances surrounding the MARCHIONESS disaster and its causes on 20th August 1989.

My answer to that question is yes.

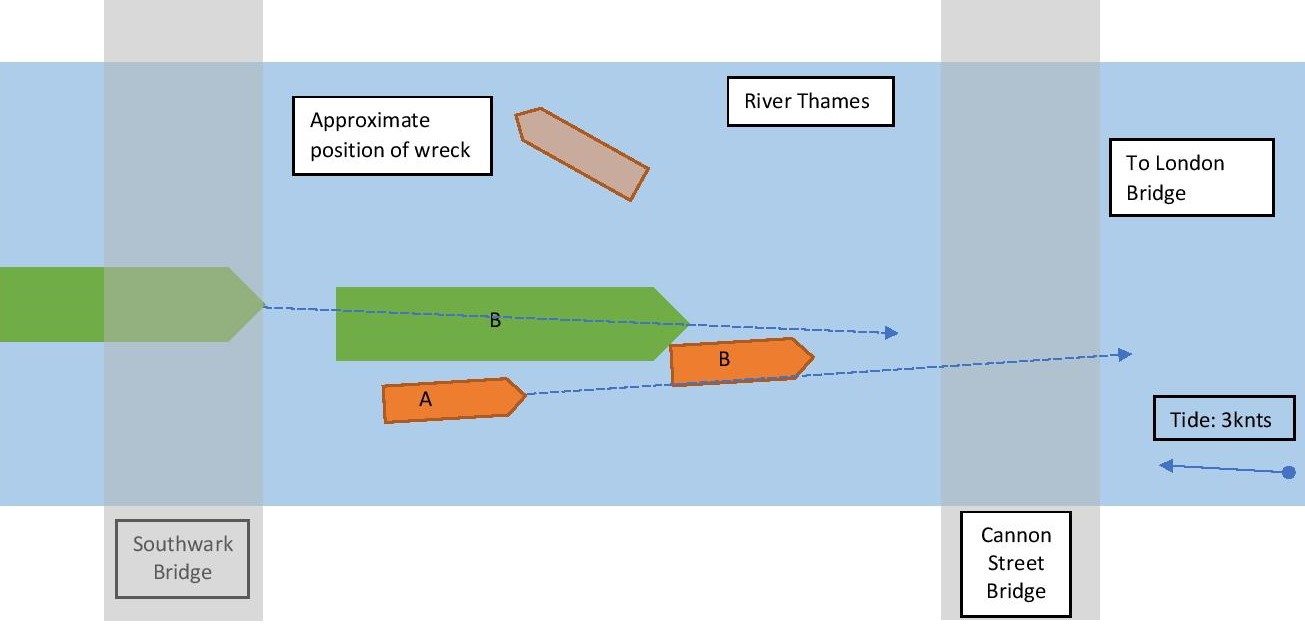
Simplified version of the incident, according to the Clarke Inquiry (not to scale)

Prescott accepted the recommendation and the public inquest took place in October and November 2000, with Clarke chairing proceedings; the report was published in March 2001. Clarke concluded that "The basic cause of the collision is clear. It was poor lookout on both vessels. Neither vessel saw the other in time to take action to avoid the collision." The underlying causes on why neither vessel saw the other were that Henderson did not ensure a proper lookout on Bowbelle; that Blayney the lookout was not equipped with suitable radio equipment to inform his captain; that Faldo had not set up a lookout system on Marchioness, nor did he keep a lookout aft himself. Focusing on Henderson, Clarke wrote "We cannot stress too strongly how much we deprecate Captain Henderson's conduct in drinking so much alcohol before returning to his vessel as master"; Clarke added "but we do not think that it is shown on the balance of probabilities that Captain Henderson would have acted differently if he had not consumed the alcohol or had the amount of sleep which he had". The captain was also criticised for his actions after the collision, when he did not broadcast a mayday call and did not deploy either the lifebuoys or life raft, in contravention of section 422 of the Merchant Shipping Act 1894. Clarke also found that the owners and managers of the vessels held some blame. For Bowbelle, the owners "must bear their share of responsibility for the collision for failing properly to instruct their masters and crews and for failing thereafter to monitor them"; the owners of Marchioness gave no instructions about all-round lookouts; and failed to adequately instruct, supervise or monitor their boats' captains.

Clarke also allotted blame to the Department of Transport, who, he said, were "well aware of the problems posed by the limited visibility from the steering positions on both types of vessel" yet failed to deal with the problem. The PLA also failed to act in this regard, and should have issued instructions for the placement of lookouts on such vessels. Clarke found that because no individual's actions could be ascertained as the single cause of the collision, a manslaughter charge would be bound to fail.

=== Compensation ===
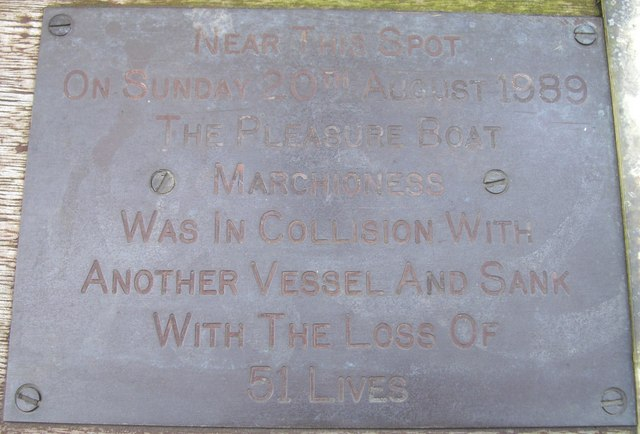
Memorial plaque on the south bank of the Thames

English law provides no compensation for fatal accidents, other than for funeral expenses, unless financial dependency at the time of death can be proved. In most cases, the families of the Marchioness victims received little more than the cost of the funeral. Louise Christian, the human rights solicitor who acted for the families of the victims, wrote that "When young unmarried people die in circumstances of gross negligence as here, death comes cheap and the boat owners and their insurance companies suffer little in the way of financial penalties".

Civil claims for compensation were brought on behalf of the victims' families; the amounts received ranged between £3,000 and £190,000. Eileen Dallaglio, the mother of Francesca Dallaglio, one of the victims, reported that she had been awarded £45,000. After the costs of having to go to the Court of Appeal to obtain damages, and the bills for the memorial and funeral service, she was left with £312.14. According to Irwin Mitchell, the solicitors who represented the families, the amounts were "modest" because many of those killed were young, without dependants and had no established careers. Under the Fatal Accidents Act 1976, damages were only paid to certain categories of people, and were based on the economic loss to the victim. The saxophonist Josephine Wells, who had toured with Tears for Fears and the Communards, who was aboard the Marchioness and had a cousin die in the disaster, subsequently suffered a mental health crisis and was unable to work. She sued the owners of Bowbelle and Marchioness for loss of earnings and in 1997 she received £150,000 in damages.

== Aftermath ==
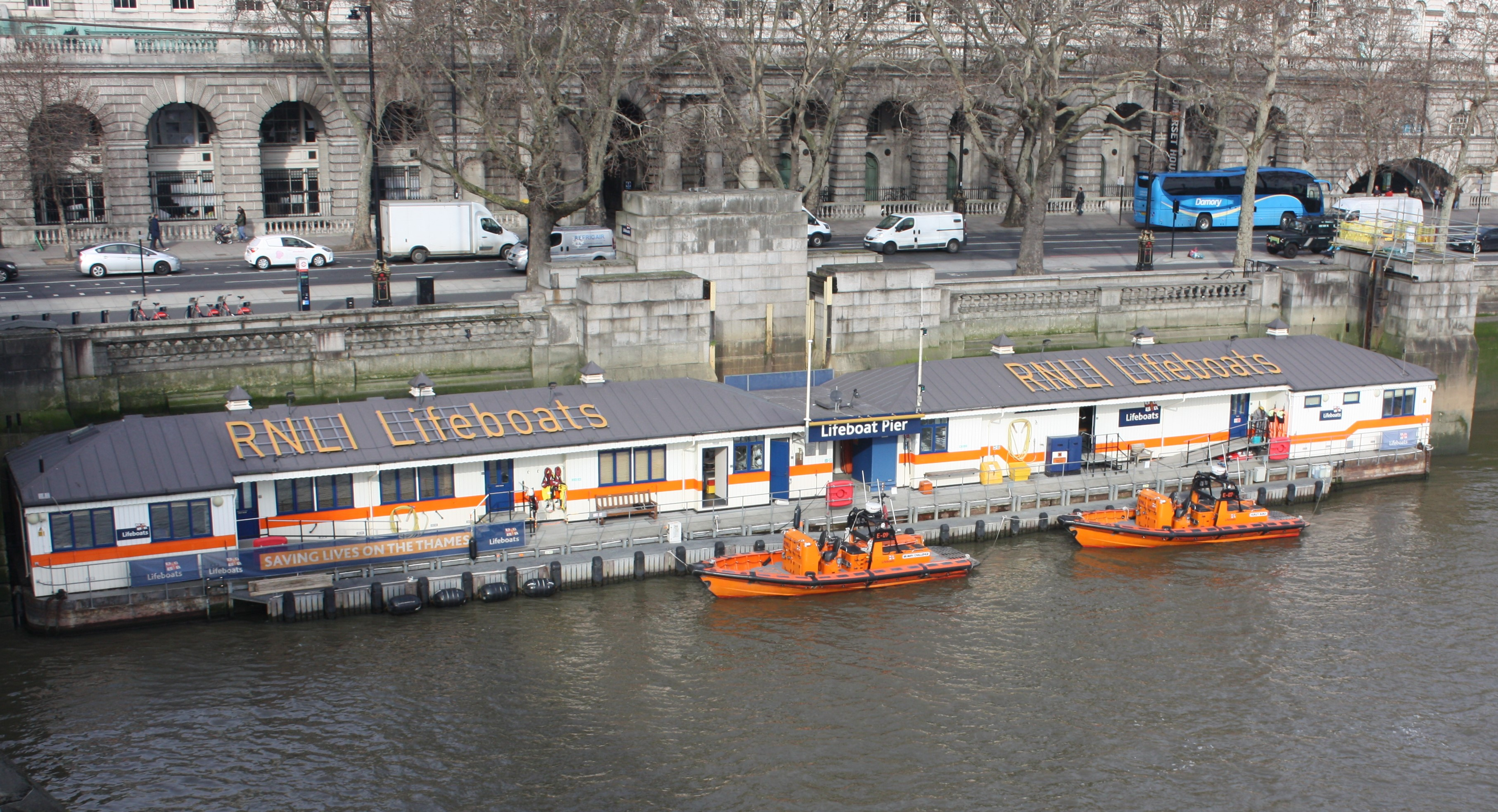
Tower Lifeboat Station, London

After recommendations made in the Clarke report relating to the improvement of river safety, the government asked the Maritime and Coastguard Agency (MCA), the PLA and the Royal National Lifeboat Institution (RNLI) to work together to set up a dedicated search and rescue service for the Thames. In January 2001 the RNLI agreed to set up four lifeboat stations—at Gravesend, Tower, Chiswick and Teddington—which were opened in January the following year.

Following the report, Prescott ordered the MCA to conduct a competency review into the actions and behaviour of Henderson. This took place in December 2001. The MCA picked up on something that had been raised during the Clarke inquiry: that Henderson had forged certificates and testimonials of his service from 1985 to 1986. They stated that they "deplored" the forgeries, which Henderson had used to gain his Master's Licence. The MCA concluded that he should be allowed to keep his master's certificate as he met all the service and medical fitness requirements; they stated that the agency "accepted that events which occurred in 1986 have no practical relevance on his current fitness".

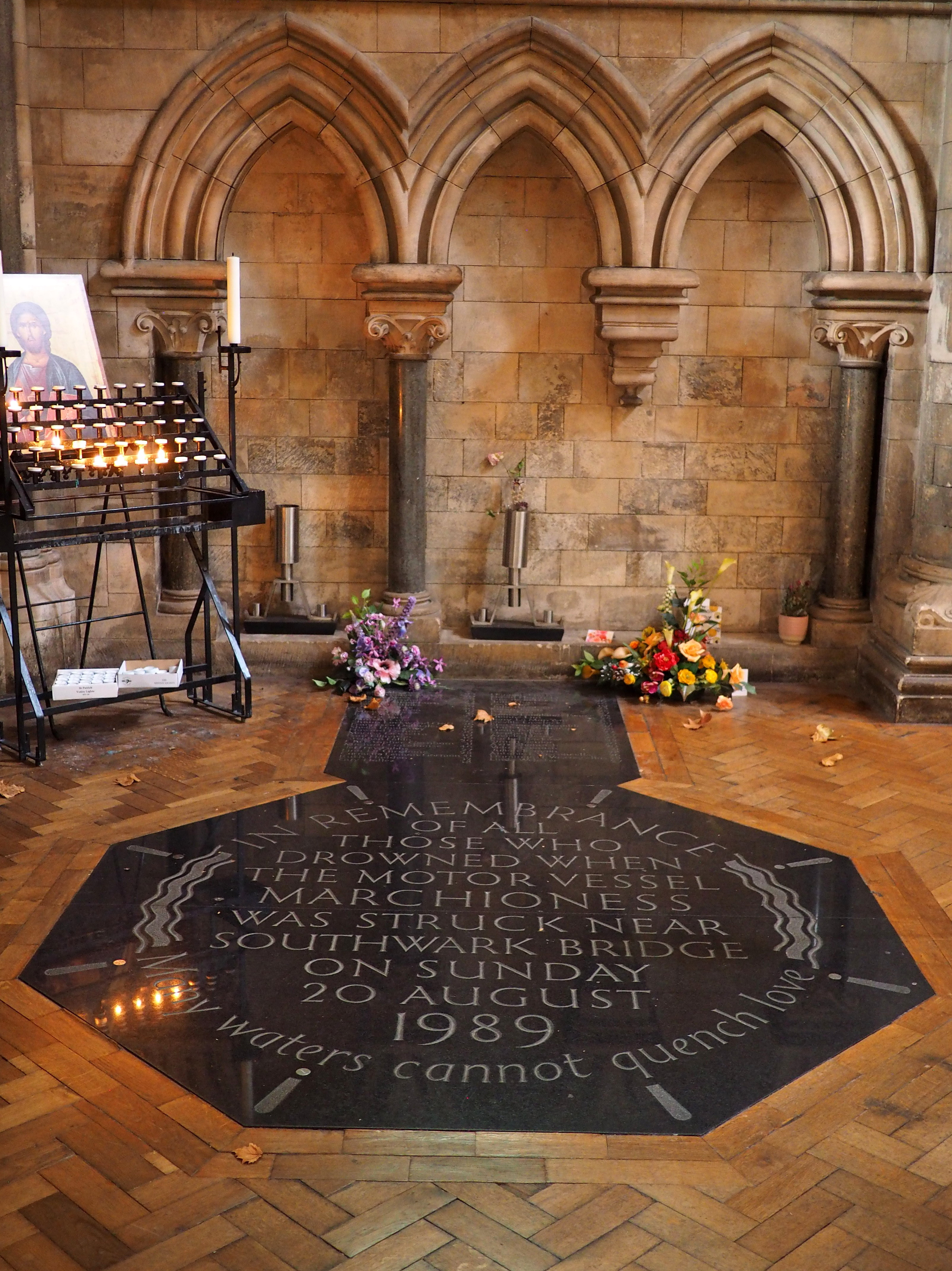
Memorial in Southwark Cathedral

In 2001 the Royal Humane Society made nineteen bravery awards to people involved in rescuing the victims of the collision, many of whom were passengers on Hurlingham. Eight policemen on duty that night were given the Metropolitan Police Commissioner's High Commendation.

Following the Clarke report and a subsequent review of emergency planning procedures, the government introduced the Civil Contingencies Act 2004 that provided a coherent framework and guidance for emergency planning and response. Clarke's recommendations to examine the coroner system were a major factor in the overhaul of the system that resulted in the Coroners and Justice Act 2009.

The events surrounding the sinking of Marchioness have been examined or depicted on television several times, including a documentary on Channel 4's Dispatches in December 1994, a drama-documentary in the BBC Two series Disaster in March 1999 and a 2009 documentary focusing on Jonathan Phang. A drama about the events surrounding the disaster was scheduled for broadcast on ITV in late 2007. Some of the victims' families requested that the programme should not be broadcast, although some thought it positive that it was going to be shown. Speaking at the Edinburgh International Television Festival that August, the former ITV Director of Drama Nick Elliot confirmed that the drama would not be shown "in its present form"; it has since been released on DVD.

In September 1989 a black granite memorial stone was uncovered in the nave of Southwark Cathedral, about 400 ft (120 m) from the site of the collision. The stone lists the names and ages of those who died. Memorial services have been held at the cathedral on anniversaries of the sinking.

Bowbelle was sold in 1992 to Sealsands Maritime, based in Kingstown, Saint Vincent and the Grenadines; she was renamed Billo. Four years later she was sold to Antonio Pereira & Filhos of Funchal, Madeira, who named the vessel Bom Rei. She broke in two and sank off Madeira the same year with the loss of one crew member.

== See also ==
- List of disasters in Great Britain and Ireland by death toll
- Sinking of SS Princess Alice

== Notes and references ==
=== Sources ===
==== Books ====
- Eyre, Anne; Dix, Pam (2014). Collective Conviction: The Story of Disaster Action. Liverpool: Liverpool University Press. ISBN 978-1-78138-123-6.
- Foley, Michael (2011). "The Marchioness". Disasters on the Thames. Stroud, Gloucestershire: The History Press. pp. 151–155. ISBN 978-0-7524-5843-4.
- Harpwood, Vivienne (2005). Modern Tort Law. London: Cavendish Publishing. ISBN 978-1-85941-976-2.
- Hartley, Hazel (2001). Exploring Sport & Leisure Disasters: A Socio-Legal Perspective. London: Cavendish Publishing. p. 1. ISBN 978-1-85941-650-1.
- Molland, Anthony F. (2008). The Maritime Engineering Reference Book: A Guide to Ship Design, Construction and Operation. Oxford: Elsevier. ISBN 978-0-7506-8987-8.
- Plummer, Russell (1990). The Ships That Saved an Army: A Comprehensive Record of the 1,300 'Little Ships' of Dunkirk. Wellingborough, Northamptonshire: Patrick Stephens. ISBN 978-1-8526-0210-9.
- Ryan, Mick (1996). Lobbying From Below: Inquest in Defence of Civil Liberties. London: Taylor & Francis Group. ISBN 978-1-85728-256-6.
- Walker, Graham; Mallett, Xanthé (2011). "The Marchioness Riverboat Disaster, August 20, 1989". In Black, Sue; Sunderland, Graham; Hackman, S. Lucinda; Mallett, Xanthé (eds.). Disaster Victim Identification: Experience and Practice. Boca Raton, FL: CRC Press. pp. 127–142. ISBN 978-1-4200-9412-1.

==== Reports ====
- Clarke, Lord Justice (2000). Thames Safety Inquiry. Final Report by Lord Justice Clarke (PDF). London: Her Majesty's Stationery Office. ISBN 978-0-1014-5582-4.
- Clarke, Lord Justice (2000). Non-statutory Inquiry: Chronology (PDF). London: Her Majesty's Stationery Office.
- Clarke, Lord Justice (2001a). Marchioness / Bowbelle: Formal Investigation under the Merchant Shipping Act 1995. Volume 1 – Report (PDF). London: Her Majesty's Stationery Office. ISBN 978-0-1170-2550-9.
- Clarke, Lord Justice (2001b). Marchioness / Bowbelle: Formal Investigation under the Merchant Shipping Act 1995. Volume 2 – Appendices (PDF). London: Her Majesty's Stationery Office. ISBN 978-0-1170-2550-9.
- Marine Accident Investigation Branch (1991). Report of the Investigation into the Collision Between the Passenger Launch Marchioness and MV Bowbelle with the Loss of Life on the River Thames on 20 August 1989, Part 1 (PDF). London: Her Majesty's Stationery Office. OCLC 988045019.
- Marine Accident Investigation Branch (1991). Report of the Investigation into the Collision Between the Passenger Launch Marchioness and MV Bowbelle with the Loss of Life on the River Thames on 20 August 1989, Part 2 (PDF). London: Her Majesty's Stationery Office. OCLC 988045019.
- Marine Accident Investigation Branch (1991). Report of the Investigation into the Collision Between the Passenger Launch Marchioness and MV Bowbelle with the Loss of Life on the River Thames on 20 August 1989, Part 3 (PDF). London: Her Majesty's Stationery Office. OCLC 988045019.
- Marine Accident Investigation Branch (1991). Report of the Investigation into the Collision Between the Passenger Launch Marchioness and MV Bowbelle with the Loss of Life on the River Thames on 20 August 1989, Part 4 (PDF). London: Her Majesty's Stationery Office. OCLC 988045019.
- Marine Accident Investigation Branch (1991). Report of the Investigation into the Collision Between the Passenger Launch Marchioness and MV Bowbelle with the Loss of Life on the River Thames on 20 August 1989, Part 5 (PDF). London: Her Majesty's Stationery Office. OCLC 988045019.
- Marine Accident Investigation Branch (1991). Report of the Investigation into the Collision Between the Passenger Launch Marchioness and MV Bowbelle with the Loss of Life on the River Thames on August 1989, Annexes (PDF). London: Her Majesty's Stationery Office. OCLC 988045019.

==== Journals ====
- Davis, Howard (April 2013). "Contextual Challenges for Crisis Support in the Immediate Aftermath of Major Incidents in the UK". The British Journal of Social Work. 43 (3): 504–521. doi:10.1093/bjsw/bcr197.
- Gibson, Kevin (2011). "Toward an Intermediate Position on Corporate Moral Personhood". Journal of Business Ethics. 101 (S1): 71–81. doi:10.1007/s10551-011-1174-5.
- Hartley, Hazel J. (2002). "A Party on the River: The 1989 Marchioness Disaster—Regulation of Safety on the River Thames and the 'Political Economy' of Risk". World Leisure Journal. 44 (4): 30–43. doi:10.1080/04419057.2002.9674289.
- Plummer, Russell (October 1989). "Thames Pleasure Boat Disaster". Ships Monthly. 24 (10): 7. OCLC 537997776.
- Taylor, Tim (May 2001). ""Marchioness"/"Bowbelle": A Legal Odyssey". Shipping and Trade Law. 1 (5): 1–5. ISSN 2329-3179.

==== News articles ====
- Billson, Anne (21 November 2008). "History of a Sleeve Shocker". The Guardian.
- "Bowbelle Sinks". The Times. 23 May 1996. p. 2.
- "Bowbelle Skipper Keeps his Licence". BBC News. 3 December 2001.
- Campbell, Duncan (13 August 1991). "DPP will let Marchioness case proceed". The Guardian. p. 3.
- "Captain 'Failed'". The Times. 18 July 1991. p. 2.
- Chaudhary, Vivek (4 April 1991). "Captain 'At Fault' Before Fatal Sinking". The Guardian. p. 3.
- Clancy, Ray (15 April 1991). "Crown Seeks Bowbelle Case Retrial". The Times. p. 2.
- Cooper, Glenda (8 April 1995). "Pleasure boat disaster on River Thames was 'A birthday voyage from celebration to tragedy'". The Independent. p. 4.
- Daniel, John; Myers, Paul (1 August 1991). "Bowbelle Firm Faces Private Prosecution". The Guardian. p. 2.
- Donovan, Patrick (17 August 1990). "Bowbelle 'Had a History of Accidents'". The Guardian. p. 8.
- "DPP Refused Private Evidence in Boat Manslaughter Case". The Guardian. 7 August 1991. p. 3.
- Dyer, Clare (22 June 1992). "Bereaved Husband Loses Private Case Over Marchioness Disaster". The Guardian. p. 3.
- Ecott, Tim (9 August 2009). "Interview: 'I felt like it was time to let go. I couldn't be bothered fighting any more'". The Guardian.
- Ezard, John (19 September 1989). "Marchioness Service Reflects Life's Ebb and Flow". The Guardian. p. 3.
- France, Anthony (4 May 2001). "Honours for Marchioness Heroes at Last". The Evening Standard. p. 23.
- Fresco, Adam (23 January 2001). "Life Boats to Rescue on Thames". The Times. p. 9.
- Gilbert, Gerard (1 October 2011). "The boy done good: Jade Goody's ex Jeff Brazier on surviving reality TV". The Independent.
- Herbert, Ian (18 August 2001). "'Marchioness' Victims Insulted Over Bigger Pay-Out for Captain's Family". The Independent. p. 9.
- Jenkins, Lin (4 April 1991a). "Bowbelle Master 'Failed to Instruct Look-Out Properly'". The Times. p. 2.
- Jenkins, Lin (20 April 1991b). "Bowbelle Master Disputes Decision to Seek a Retrial". The Times. p. 3.
- Jenkins, Lin (1 August 1991c). "Bowbelle's Captain Cleared After Second Hung Jury". The Times. p. 3.
- Johnson, Angella (8 April 1995). "Quest That Led Marchioness Relatives to New Start". The Guardian. p. 7.
- Jury, Louise (9 April 1997). "Damages for musician whose career perished in disaster". The Independent.
- Katz, Ian (15 August 1991). "Fury at Rifkind on Disaster Report". The Guardian. p. 5.
- King, Geoff (22 August 1989). "Police Say Cruiser Carried Too Many". The Times. p. 2.
- Leathley, Arthur (21 August 1989). "Invitation-only Party Organized by Friends". The Times. p. 2.
- Lister, Sam (3 January 2002). "First Thames Lifeboats Launched". The Times. p. 9.
- "Marchioness Boat Disaster Marked". BBC News. 20 August 2009.
- "Marchioness Hands 'Lost for Years'". BBC News. 8 December 2000.
- "Marchioness Victims Remembered 25 Years on at Service". BBC News. 20 August 2014.
- Martin, Nicole (24 August 2007). "Marchioness Families Ask ITV to Drop Drama". The Daily Telegraph.
- Nikkhah, Roya (20 February 2011). "Lawrence Dallaglio's guilt at using sister's death to improve his game". The Daily Telegraph.
- Parry, Gareth (21 August 1989a). "60 Feared Drowned in Thames: Captain and Second Mate of Dredger are Arrested". The Guardian. p. 1.
- Parry, Gareth (22 August 1989b). "Minister Orders River Shake-Up". The Guardian. p. 1.
- Parry, Gareth (23 August 1989c). "Bowbelle Crew was Sober, Marchioness Inquest Told". The Guardian. p. 1.
- Parry, Gareth (24 August 1989d). "Another 13 Marchioness Victims Found". The Guardian. p. 2.
- Perera, Shyama (21 August 1989). "Thatcher Flies Back to Scene of Tragedy". The Guardian. p. 3.
- "Report calls for Thames Lookouts". The Guardian. 1 September 1989. p. 25.
- Sapstead, David (23 October 1989). "Report Clears Dredger Crew". The Times. p. 1.
- Sapstead, David (27 April 1990). "Captain of Thames Dredger to Face Charge". The Times. p. 5.
- Souster, Mark (24 April 1990a). "Thames Disaster Inquest Reopens Amid Criticism". The Times. p. 3.
- Souster, Mark (27 April 1990b). "Captain of Thames Dredger to Face Charge". The Times. p. 5.
- Stacey, Robin; King, Geoff (22 August 1989). "Fashion Industry Mourns Deaths on Party Cruiser". The Times. p. 2.
- Wallis, Lynne (20 April 1999). "You can't always get what you want". The Independent.

==== Internet ====
- "Bowbelle (6413235)". Miramar Ship Index.
- Butcher, Louise (15 June 2010). "Shipping: Safety on the River Thames and the Marchioness Disaster" (PDF). House of Commons Library. Archived from the original (PDF) on 15 February 2019.
- Christian, Louise (12 April 1995). "Letter: Compensation for Loss of Young Lives". The Independent. Archived from the original on 2 February 2019.
- Clark, Gregory (2020). "The Annual RPI and Average Earnings for Britain, 1209 to Present (New Series)". MeasuringWorth.
- "Disaster". BBC Genome. Archived from the original on 16 February 2019.
- "The Marchioness: a Survivor's Story". BBC Genome. Archived from the original on 16 February 2019.
- "Marchioness Riverboat Disaster: 20 August 1989". Irwin Mitchell. Archived from the original on 20 July 2008.
