= BI-LO =

BI-LO was the name of several different supermarket chains around the world:

- Bi-Lo (Australia)
- BI-LO (United States) in the southeastern United States
- For the Bi-Lo franchise in the northeastern United States, see Penn Traffic

== See also ==
- Bilo (disambiguation)
