= Paul Knapman =

British coroner (1944–2026)

Paul Anthony Knapman DL (5 November 1944 – 5 April 2026) was a British coroner. He served as Her Majesty's coroner for Westminster (and Inner West London) from 1980 to 2011 (and deputy coroner from 1975 to 1980). His responsibility for investigating sudden deaths as an independent judicial officer saw him preside over numerous notable cases.

Knapman was made a deputy lieutenant of Greater London in 2008 and advanced to the representative deputy lieutenant for Westminster in 2013.

== Early life ==
Paul Anthony Knapman was born in Torquay, Devon, England on 5 November 1944. He attended Epsom College, Surrey, King's College London, and St George's Hospital Medical School, London, where he qualified as a doctor – MB, BS (1968). He then read for the Bar at the Council of Legal Education, and was called to the Bar as a barrister by Gray's Inn in 1972.

Honours

- Two medicolegal diplomas, namely DMJ in 1975 and FFLM in 2005
- FRCP (Honoris Causa) in 1997
- FRCS (Honoris Causa) in 1995

== Cases and events ==
As coroner, Knapman dealt with approximately 85,000 deaths and 12,500 inquests including about 500 homicides. One of his last major cases, in October 2010, was presiding over the inquest of the barrister Mark Saunders, shot dead by Metropolitan Police on 6 May 2008. After ruling it a lawful killing, Knapman said he would use his powers as coroner to highlight lessons to be learned by the police and would make copies of his recommendation available to Secretary of State for Justice, Kenneth Clarke.

- Sandra Rivett, Nanny to Lord Lucan, 1975 (deputy coroner)

As deputy coroner, Knapman helped prepare the inquest into the death of Sandra Rivett, nanny to the children of Lord Lucan. He sat with the coroner during the inquest in 1975; the jury ruled Lucan should stand trial at The Old Bailey for the murder of Rivett. Lucan had disappeared and was never found.

- Georgi Markov, 1978 (deputy coroner)

As deputy coroner, he was consulted and involved in all stages following the death of Georgi Markov, on 11 September 1978. Markov was a Bulgarian working for the BBC World Service and considered a thorn in the side of Communist authorities. His cause of death was by a pellet probably containing ricin.

- Iranian Embassy Siege, 1980

The US Embassy in Tehran was besieged by the Iranian Authorities and the American citizens working there taken hostage. A rescue attempt failed when US helicopters crashed in the desert. Subsequently, the Iranian Embassy in London was seized by six terrorists on 30 April, and they shot a hostage before the Special Air Service (SAS) stormed the building on 5 May. At the inquest the jury unanimously returned a verdict of justifiable homicide concerning the deaths of all the terrorists.

- Murder of Yvonne Fletcher, 1984

On 17 April 1984, there was a protest outside the Libyan Embassy in St. James' Square, London. Gunshots from the Embassy injured demonstrators and killed WPC Yvonne Fletcher. At the inquest it was shown that the shots came from the first floor of the Embassy. The jury concluded she was unlawfully killed.

- Clapham Junction rail crash, 1988

On Monday 12 December 1988, outside Clapham Junction railway station a train from Basingstoke was struck by a following train from Bournemouth, a third train from London on the adjacent line collided with the wreckage. Thirty-five people were killed. The inquests into all 35 were held at a special court at Westminster Council House. After an outline of the accident the court heard evidence regarding each of the deceased before the coroner adjourned the inquest for a Public Enquiry to be held.

- Marchioness disaster, 1989

On 20 August 1989, the pleasure boat Marchioness was struck by the dredger Bowbelle on the River Thames in London, killing 51 people. In the following days as victims were still being recovered from the water, methods used to help identify bodies included dental records, identification of personal items and clothing, and fingerprints. The standard practice of the time to remove the hands of decomposed bodies for fingerprint identification caused controversy when families of victims said they had not been told and that it had been unnecessary. Although 25 pairs of hands were removed only four victims were identified in this way, the rest through other means. During an inquiry into Knapman's actions, he said the hands had been removed to get identification of the victims to their families as soon as possible.

In 1992, Knapman refused to resume the inquest into the victims' deaths saying that there had been four inquiries/court proceedings already. In January 1993, mothers of two of the victims began legal action for judicial review of his decision.

After judicial review, the Court of Appeal heard the appeal in June 1994. Lord Justice Brown said "no-one should interpret this judgement as a condemnation of Knapman ... he handled the many difficulties ... with sensitivity [and] evident sympathy for the bereaved families". Lord Justice Farquharson said, "the coroner was most concerned about the welfare of the bereaved families, and [went to lengths] far beyond those normally expected of a Coroner." Master of the Rolls Sir Thomas Bingham said, "I reach this decision with regret, the coroner reacted to this horrific tragedy with energy and public spirit. He went to great lengths to treat the bereaved with sympathy and understanding.....the issue for this court is, however, the single limited question." Knapman and Dolman were stood down and a new coroner, Dr John Burton, was appointed. Burton held the inquest into all the Marchioness deaths.

In February 2000, Deputy Prime Minister John Prescott ordered a Public Enquiry into the Marchioness disaster, overseen by Lord Justice Clarke. Clarke expressed concern over the removal of the hands of the victims. Some victim's family members urged Knapman to resign.

- Ladbroke Grove rail crash, 1999

On 5 October 1999, a Thames train to Bedwyn in Wiltshire left Paddington Station and collided head on with a First Great Western train travelling into Paddington from Cheltenham. The combined speed was 130 mph and fuel ignited, causing a fireball which burnt out the first carriage of the Cheltenham train. 31 people were killed.

The inquests into the 31 dead were held at Westminster Council House, with an outline of the accident followed by details of the casualties. Then a letter from The Lord Chancellor was delivered, requesting the inquest be adjourned pending the result of a public enquiry conducted by Lord Cullen. The inquest was not resumed.

- 7 July London bombings, 2005 (as lead coroner)

On 7 July 2005, in the morning four separate suicide bombs exploded in London, three on London Underground trains and the fourth on a double decker bus, killing a combined total of 56 people. As there were four sites, there were two other coroners involved apart from Knapman. He was Lead Coroner for the first ten days until all bodies had been identified, then handed over to Incident Coroner Dr. Andrew Reid, Coroner for Inner North London. For the first time, Lord Justice Clark's report "Identification of Victims Following Major Transport Accidents" was used. There was also an "Identification Commission" chaired by the coroner to scrutinise documentation etc. before an identification was absolutely confirmed. Inquests were opened and adjourned by each of the three Coroners before all the inquests were transferred to Knapman at Westminster under the provisions of The Coroners' Act 1988. Knapman appointed Lady Justice Hallett as assistant deputy coroner and she held inquests into the deaths.

- Inquest into Diana, Princess of Wales and Dodi Fayed, 2007

In Paris on 31 August 1997, Diana, Princess of Wales and Mr. Dodi Al-Fayed were killed in a car crash. Both bodies were repatriated to London. Protracted enquiries and legal difficulties delayed their inquests until 6 January 2004, held by Michael Burgess, HM Coroner for Surrey and The Royal Household. He resigned from the cases due to "heavy and constant workload" on 24 July 2006, and appointed Lady Butler-Sloss as his deputy. Knapman was appointed coroner on 2 March 2007. Lady Butler-Sloss resigned on 24 April 2007. On 7 June 2007, Knapman appointed Lord Justice Scott Baker as assistant deputy coroner, who began inquests into both Diana and Al-Fayed on 2 October 2007. The jury returned a verdict of "unlawful killing" implicating driver Henri Paul and the paparazzi.

== Posts held ==
- President of The Old Epsomian Club in 1999
- Honorary Colonel Westminster Dragoons
- President of the Coroner's Society in 2009
- President of the Clinical Forensic and Legal section of The Royal Society of Medicine 1995–1997
- Master of the Worshipful Society of Apothecaries 2006–2007
- Representative Deputy Lieutenant for Westminster 2013 – (Greater London Lieutenancy)

== Charitable work ==
Paul Knapman was Chairman of Governors of The London Nautical School 1997–1999, having been a governor for eighteen years in total. He helped found the charity, the Coroners' Courts Support Service, with a pilot scheme in his court, which commenced in January 2003. The charity won the research, advice and support category of The Charity Awards (UK) 2011. He was the Chairman of the board of trustees of the charity until 2011. He was a trustee of The St. John's Wood Alms Houses and The Society of Apothecaries Charitable Trust. He was a member of the Management Committee of Westminster Boating Base.

== Death ==
Knapman died on 5 April 2026, at the age of 81.

== Books and publications ==
- The Law and Practice on Coroners (3rd Edition 1985)
- Medicine and the Law (1989)
- Casebook on Coroners (1989)
- Sources on Coroners Law (1999)
- "Medical Negligence" (1990) (2nd Edition 1994)
- "Atkins' Court Forms Volume 13"1992) (Volume 13 2000)
