= Billa (soundtrack) =

Billa (Original Motion Picture Soundtrack)

Soundtrack album by Yuvan Shankar Raja
- Released: 21 November 2007
- Recorded: 2007
- Genre: Feature film soundtrack
- Length: 24:30
- Language: Tamil
- Label: Ayngaran Music; An Ak Audio; Think Music
- Producer: Yuvan Shankar Raja

Yuvan Shankar Raja chronology
Machakaaran (2007)	Billa (Original Motion Picture Soundtrack) (2007)	Vaazhthugal (2008)

Billa (Original Motion Picture Soundtrack) is the soundtrack album to the 2007 film of the same name directed by Vishnuvardhan starring Ajith Kumar, Nayanthara and Namitha. It is a remake of the eponymous 1980 Tamil film which itself is based on the Hindi film Don (1978). Yuvan Shankar Raja composed the musical score and soundtrack with the lyrics written by Pa. Vijay. The soundtrack consisted of two songs from the original counterpart remixed for the film, three original songs and a theme music. It was released on 21 November 2007 to critical and commercial success.

== Development ==
"Billa has become the most expected movie after Sivaji. I could see that from the day the film was announced. When Vishnu [Vardhan] came and told me that he was directing Billa, and that Ajith would be Billa, I could sense something very big was coming. But I didn't expect this film turning out to be this big."

— Yuvan Shankar Raja

Vishnuvardhan renewed his association with Yuvan Shankar Raja—who worked together in Kurumbu (2003), Arinthum Ariyamalum (2005) and Pattiyal (2006)—for the music of Billa, which was the second time Yuvan had scored an Ajith-starrer since Dheena (2001). The original counterpart was a huge success upon its release in 1980, so as M. S. Viswanathan's compositions for the film which offered him a huge responsibility to the composer. As the film had humongous expectations, he found it "exciting" to work on the album.

Yuvan wanted the music to sound "very modern, very metallica" and refrained using live sounds. Keeping the tone of the film in his mind, Yuvan developed the use of modernistic and funky sounds while working on the film as he felt that "I should enjoy while working on a track and I should feel like listening to it again. This is what I kept in my mind." Yuvan tuned the songs in Malaysia where the film was shot, and used the sounds from that location in order to match the film's tonality.

Yuvan remixed two songs from the 1980 film: "My Name is Billa" and "Vethalaiya Potendi". He described it difficult to remix a popular song as he felt that he should not spoil the essence of the original version. Despite that, he produced a modernistic sound for the remix which was being "more trendy and plastic". The original lyrics of the songs written by poet Kannadasan kept intact as well as new lyrics written by Pa. Vijay.

The song "Sei Yedhavathu Sei" had an Arabic style which was mixed with Indian classical music. "Naan Meendum" had a gospel choir and was sung by newcomer Deepika. For the album, Yuvan retained the same set of singers who were used in the previous Vishnuvardhan films which includes Shankar Mahadevan, Vijay Yesudas, KK, Neha Bhasin, Preethi Balla.

Yuvan reused some bits of the background music from his previous ventures—Kedi and Vallavan (both 2006)—for the film. The instrumental piece used in the background of "Vallava Ennai Vellava" which utilized drumbeats and metallic percussions, were incorporated in the theme music.

== Release ==
The soundtrack was highly anticipated amongst trade circles. The album had a soft launch on 21 November 2007 with Rajinikanth (who starred in the original film) released the audio CD at his residence in Poes Garden, Chennai. A formal launch event was held at the Residency Towers Hotel in Chennai on 25 November, with Ajith, Yuvan, Vishnuvardhan, Rahman and Prabhu in attendance.

== Reception ==
=== Critics ===
The album received positive reviews from critics. Pavithra Srinivasan from Rediff gave it four out of five and wrote: "Yuvan Shankar Raja has etched an intricate musical feast to complement the tale – and quite a feast it's turned out to be, a la the original". A reviewer from Indiaglitz.com wrote that the track was a "masterly work from young Yuvan... [which]... takes us to a different world". Venkat from Behindwoods wrote that it was the "soul of the film" which "stands out as the highlight of the album, giving that eerie feel required of a film about a don" and an "interesting composition with arrangements that spell international quality". Revathi of Kalki also praised Yuvan's music in her review.

However, Karthik Srinivasan of Milliblog stated that "Given Vishnuvardhan's past success with Yuvan's music, it's surprising that a large part of Billa's music is rather mediocre." A critic from Sify complimented the title track and theme music, as one of the film's highlights but felt that the songs "fall flat". The review added "My Name is Billa" as "no patch on the original and lacks its fervor" while praised "Vethalaiya Pottendi" and "Seval Kodi" for its beats, vocals and picturization.

=== Sales and records ===
The album achieved record audio sales with Sify reporting that it took the "best ever audio opening" for an Ajith film and the second highest opening day sales recorded for the year after Sivaji: The Boss (2007). Nearly 22,000 CDs and cassettes were said to be sold out by the first day evening all over Tamil Nadu. A spokesperson from Ayngaran Music stated: "We never expected such a fantastic audio opening at a time when generally audio sales are down."

== Legacy ==
After the audio release, the songs "My Name is Billa" and "Seval Kodi" and the theme music emerged popularity amongst listeners and audience. The music was instrumental in the film's success. "Seval Kodi" was mentioned by The Times of India, as one among five Tamil songs that celebrated Tamil culture, as its lyrics "described the superior power of Tamil's god Murugan". The theme music was altered in the prequel Billa II (2012) by Yuvan.

== Track listing ==
All lyrics are written by Pa. Vijay.

No.	Title	Artist(s)	Length
1.	"My Name Is Billa"	Naveen, KK	3:54
2.	"Naan Meendum"	Deepika	4:46
3.	"Sei Yedhavathu Sei"	Neha Bhasin, Preethi Balla	4:50
4.	"Seval Kodi"	Vijay Yesudas, Crane Manohar	4:53
5.	"Vethalaiya Potendi"	Shankar Mahadevan	4:23
6.	"Theme Music"	Instrumental	1:44
Total length:			24:30

== See also ==
- Billa II (soundtrack)
