= Bille (given name) =

Bille is a given name. Notable people with the name include:

- Bille August (born 1948), Danish film and television director
- Bille Eltringham, British film and television director
- Bille Woodruff, American music and film director
- Nicki Bille Nielsen (born 1988), Danish footballer
- Billie Eilish (born 2001), American singer/writer

Bille can also be used as an abbreviation (nickname) of the name Sibylle (given female name).

== See also ==
- Bille Brown (1952–2013), Australian actor and playwright
