= Gabriela Biló =

Brazilian photojournalist

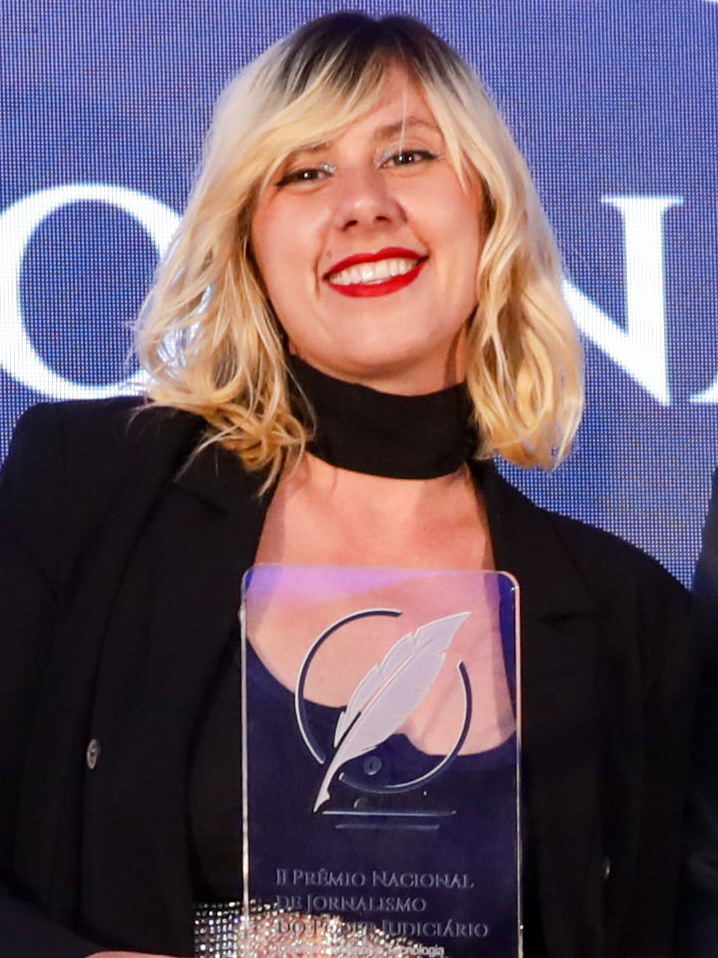
- Born: São Paulo
- Spouse(s): Cristiano Botafogo

Gabriela Biló (born 1989 in São Paulo) is a Brazilian photojournalist dedicated to political journalism. In 2020 and 2021, she was the winner of the Mulher Imprensa Trophy and received an honorable mention at the Vladimir Herzog Award for her coverage of President Jair Bolsonaro's routine. She was a finalist for the LOBA Prize from Leica and won the IREE Journalism Prize. She is the author of the book A Verdade Vós Libertará published by Editora Fósforo.

== Career ==
Her career as a journalist began in 2012 when she worked for the Futura Press agency. In 2014, she was hired by O Estado de S. Paulo and made her first professional trip to Brasília with the aim of taking a photo of Michel Temer, then vice president, on the night he would receive the presidential sash from Dilma Rousseff. She moved to Brasília in 2019, becoming the first woman in the history of O Estado de S. Paulo to work as a photographer in the capital. She currently works for the newspaper Folha de S.Paulo.

== Works ==
Presidente Viral was a photographic record created by Brazilian photographer Gabriela Biló for the newspaper O Estado de S. Paulo in 2020. In that same year, the work received an honorable mention at the 42nd edition of the Vladimir Herzog Award. The photograph is considered not only a portrait of then-President Jair Bolsonaro without a mask and coughing but also a portrayal of the pandemic crisis the country was facing, capturing the "decisive moment" spirit of Bresson.
