= MV Bowbelle =

Dredger involved with the Marchioness disaster

- Bowbelle

History
- Name: Bowbelle (1964–92); Billo (1992–96); Bom Rei (1996)
- Owner: F. Bowles & Sons Ltd (1964–66); British Dredging (Shipping) Ltd (1966–77); British Dredging Aggregates Ltd (1977–78); British Dredging (Sand & Gravel) Ltd (1978–84); East Coast Aggregates Ltd (1984–89); South Coast Shipping Co. Ltd (1989–90); East Coast Aggregates Ltd (1990–92); Seal Sands Maritime Ltd (1992–96); Antonio Pereira e Filhos Lda (1996)
- Operator: F. Bowles & Sons Ltd (1964–66); British Dredging (Shipping) Ltd (1966–77); British Dredging Aggregates Ltd (1977–78); British Dredging (Sand & Gravel) Ltd (1978–84); East Coast Aggregates Ltd (1984–89); South Coast Shipping Co. Ltd (1989–90); East Coast Aggregates Ltd (1990–92); Bilberry Shipping & Stevedores Ltd (1992–96); Antonio Pereira e Filhos Lda (1996)
- Port of registry: Cardiff, United Kingdom (1964–78); London, United Kingdom (1978–92); Kingstown, Saint Vincent and the Grenadines (1992–96); Funchal, Portugal (1996)
- Builder: Ailsa Shipbuilding Ltd
- Yard number: 517
- Launched: 11 May 1964
- Completed: 15 July 1964
- Out of service: 25 March 1996
- Identification: Code Letters GNLE (1964–92); United Kingdom Official Number 306078 (1964–92); Lloyd's Register number 6413235 (1960s–1987); IMO number: 6413235 (1987–96); Call sign J8GH2 (1992–96)
- Fate: Broke in two and sank

General characteristics
- Class & type: Suction hopper dredger
- Tonnage: 1,486 gross register tons (GRT), 803 net register tons (NRT), 2,107 tons deadweight (DWT)
- Length: 262 feet 2 inches (79.91 m) overall, 250 ft 0 in (76.20 m) between perpendiculars
- Beam: 44 ft 3 in (13.49 m)
- Depth: 17 ft 0 in (5.18 m)
- Installed power: Mirrlees M47M diesel engine 1,864 bhp.
- Speed: 11.75 knots (21.76 km/h)
- Capacity: Hopper capacity 1,257 cubic yards (961 m^{3})
- Crew: 7

Bowbelle was a suction hopper dredger which was built in 1964 for F. Bowles & Sons Ltd, Cardiff, Glamorgan, United Kingdom. In 1989, she collided with, and sank, the pleasure steamer Marchioness, resulting in the loss of 51 lives. She was sold to a firm in Gibraltar in 1992 and was renamed Billo. She was sold to a firm in Portugal in 1996 and renamed Bom Rei. She foundered off Madeira in March 1996 with the loss of one crew member.

== Description ==
The ship was 262 feet 2 inches (79.91 m) long overall, 250 ft 0 in (76.20 m) between perpendiculars, with a beam of 44 ft 3 in (13.49 m). She had a depth of 27 ft 3 in (8.31 m). She was assessed at 1,485 GRT, 803 NRT, 2,107 DWT. She had a hopper capacity of 1,257 cubic yards (961 m^{3}).

The ship was powered by a four-stroke single acting diesel engine, which had eight cylinders of 15 inches (38 cm) diameter by 20 inches (51 cm) stroke driving a single screw propeller. The engine was built by Mirrlees National Ltd, Stockport, Cheshire. It was rated at 1,864 bhp (1,371 kW) at 344 rpm. It could propel her at 11.75 knots (21.76 km/h).

== History ==
Bowbelle was built in 1964 as yard number 517 by the Ailsa Shipbuilding Co. Ltd., Troon, Ayrshire for F. Bowles & Sons Ltd, Cardiff, Glamorgan. She was launched on 11 May 1964 and completed on 15 July. Her port of registry was Cardiff. The Code Letters GNLE were allocated, as was the United Kingdom Official Number 306078. She was built to pass under bridges over the River Thames as far upstream as Nine Elms. To accomplish this, her masts could be folded to pass under the various bridges and her superstructure was reduced in height. On her maiden voyage, she almost collided with the Tower Pier when her anchors failed to fully release. Her normal complement was seven men.

In November 1964, Bowbelle and her sister ship Bowqueen were detained in port in London due to a dispute involving the Watermen, Lightermen, Tugmen and Bargemen's Union (WLTBU). Having been detained for six weeks, both vessels sailed around 30 December. F. Bowles & Sons took legal action to prevent the union from interfering with the new crews signed aboard the ships. An ex parte injunction was granted. It was reported to be the first issued against a union. The dispute was because the crews of the ships switched their membership from the National Seamen's Union to the WLTBU, which F. Bowles & Sons did not recognise. The crews of both vessels refused to sail until the WLTBU was recognised. On 13 January, the case went back to Court. Requests by F. Bowles & Sons and the Metropolitan Sand and Ballast Co. for injunctions preventing the WLTBU from interfering with their businesses were denied.

With their introduction in the 1960s, Bowbelle was allocated the Lloyd's Register Number 6413235, which became her IMO Number in 1987. She was sold to British Dredging Aggregates Ltd, Cardiff in 1977 and then to British Dredging (Sand & Gravel) Co. Ltd., London in 1978. Her port of registry was changed to London. On 26 May 1982, Bowbelle collided with scaffolding on Cannon Street Railway Bridge. On 9 June 1983, she collided with the excursion boat Pride of Greenwich near the Hungerford Bridge. Bowbelle was sold to East Coast Aggregates Ltd., London in 1984. On 5 November 1987, she collided with the dredger Bowsprite near Tower Bridge. Bowbelle was damaged at the bows and holed below her waterline. She was sold to South Coast Shipping Co. Ltd., Southampton, Hampshire in 1988.

At 01:46 on 20 August 1989, Bowbelle collided with the excursion boat Marchioness between Southwark Bridge and Cannon Street Railway Bridge. Marchioness sank with the loss of 51 lives. There were 80 survivors. The accident was investigated by the Marine Accident Investigation Branch, which published its report on 5 June 1990. The investigation found that visibility from the wheelhouse of both vessels was severely restricted. Marchioness was not keeping to the starboard side of the river and those on board Bowbelle did not maintain an efficient look out. Neither vessel was aware of the other until it was too late to avoid a collision.

Bowbelle was sold in 1990 to East Coast Aggregates Ltd, Southampton. She was sold to Seal Sands Maritime Ltd., Gibraltar in 1992 and renamed Billo. She was reflagged to Saint Vincent and the Grenadines and placed under the management of Bilberry Shipping & Stevedores Ltd., Waterford, Ireland. The call sign J8GH2 was allocated.

Billo was sold in 1996 to Antonio Pereira e Filhos Lda, Funchal, Madeira, Portugal, who renamed her Bom Rei. On 25 March 1996, her dredge pipe caught on the seabed and ruptured her hull. She broke in two and sank off Ponta do Sol, Madeira (32°40′N 17°07′W) with the loss of one of her crew of seven. The wreck lies in 100 feet (30 m) of water south west of Madeira and is a popular dive site.
