= Whitehills Lifeboat Station =

Former RNLI lifeboat station in Aberdeenshire, Scotland

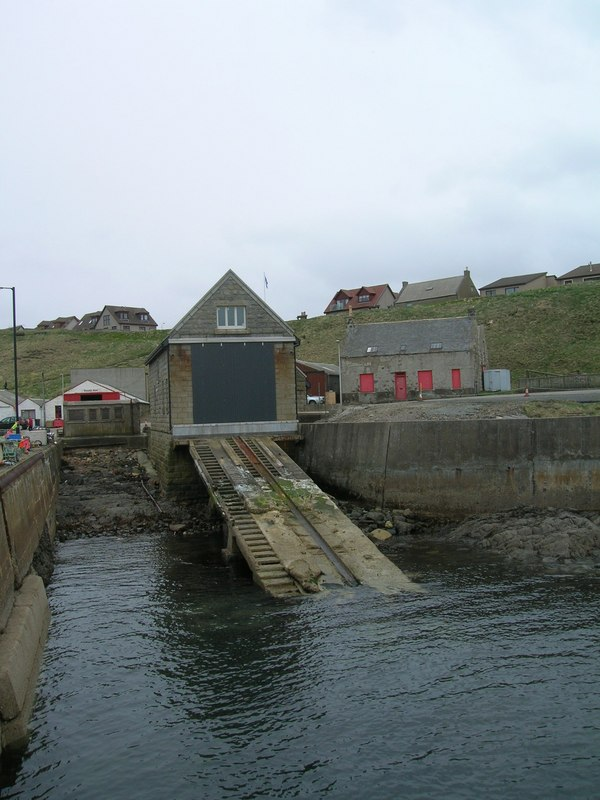
- 1933 Whitehills Lifeboat Station

- Whitehills, Scotland

General information
- Status: Closed
- Type: RNLI Lifeboat Station
- Location: Harbour Place, Whitehills, Aberdeenshire,, Scotland
- Coordinates: 57°40′46.6″N 2°34′42.7″W
- Opened: 1924
- Closed: 1969

Whitehills Lifeboat Station was located at Harbour Place in Whitehills, a harbour town on the south shore of the Moray Firth on the north coast of Aberdeenshire, formerly Banffshire, in north-east Scotland.

A lifeboat station was first established in the area at Banff in 1860 by the Royal National Lifeboat Institution (RNLI). It was later moved to Macduff, before being relocated to Whitehills in 1923.

After operating for 45 years, Whitehills Lifeboat Station closed in 1969. Five years later, in March 1974, a new lifeboat station was re-established at Macduff.

== History ==
In 1859, Capt. MacDonald, Commander of H.M. Coastguard at Banff, responded to the RNLI, who at the time were keen to place more lifeboats on the coast of Scotland. With the support of the Banff Harbour Trustees, he gained considerable support locally, and the RNLI placed a lifeboat at Banff in 1860.

For earlier history, please see

- Banff and Macduff Lifeboat Station

In 1917, Banff and Macduff Lifeboat Station closed temporarily in 1917, due to shortage of crew brought about by World War One. It is likely that the station never reopened after the war, as difficulties finding a crew were still being encountered in 1923.

In 1923, Banff and Macduff Lifeboat Station reopened at Whitehills Harbour, on a one-year trial basis, primarily as there were sufficient numbers there to form a crew.

At a meeting of the local branch on 12 December 1924, it was announced that the move to Whitehills would be permanent, and that the Institution had agreed to provide a motor-powered lifeboat to the Station. The station name was changed to Whitehills Lifeboat Station. As it turned out, the next lifeboat to be stationed at Whitehills, in 1928, was another 35-foot 'Pulling and Sailing' lifeboat, George Gordon Moir (ON 606), formerly stationed at Kirkcudbright.

When Whitehills finally got their new motor-powered lifeboat in 1932, it was not without its teething problems. The lifeboat, a 35-foot 6in self-righting motor lifeboat, with a 35-hp engine, delivering 7⅓ knots, on passage from the boat-yard at Cowes, set out from the overnight stop at Aberdeen at 08:00 on 14 August 1932, only to suffer engine problems. Putting back to Aberdeen, the Aberdeen No.1 lifeboat Emma Constance (ON 693) was launched, and towed the new boat back into harbour.

The naming ceremony of the new motor-powered lifeboat was a grand affair, and took place on 5 October 1932, in front of a large crowd. The lifeboat was one of two that year, that were funded by the Civil Service, the second lifeboat, Civil Service No.5, being placed at Donaghadee. The Whitehills lifeboat was handed to the care of the Institution by Lord Southborough, and accepted by The Duke of Montrose, who then presented the boat to the local branch of the RNLI. After a service of dedication by The Rev. J. G. Ledingham, MA, a bottle of champagne was broken on the bow of the boat, and H.R.H. Princess Arthur of Connaught, Duchess of Fife named the lifeboat Civil Service No.4 (ON 756). Music was provided by the Banff Pipe Band and the Turriff Silver Band, with the ceremony attended by lifeboats from Buckie and Fraserburgh.

In 1933, a new stone-built boathouse was constructed on Harbour Place in Whitehills.

At 22:13 on 8 April 1948, the Whitehills lifeboat Civil Service No.4 was launched to the steamship S.S. Lindean, which had run aground at Macduff harbour. The lifeboat stood by, as all the crew were taken off by Rocket Brigade. Returning to harbour at midnight, a large wave picked up the lifeboat, casting the boat on the rocks. All the crew were quickly ashore, but the following day revealed that the sternpost was broken, there was damage to her bilge keels and rudder, and 14-feet of the bottom of the boat was torn away. Too costly to repair the sixteen-year-old lifeboat, Civil Service No.4 was withdrawn from service.

After operating for 46 years, with lifeboat cover to the west and east, provided by Buckie and Fraserburgh, it was decided to withdraw the All-weather lifeboat. Whitehills Lifeboat Station closed in 1969.

The 1933 station building is listed, and now a private residence. The lifeboat on station at the time of closure, Helen Wycherley (ON 959), which was launched only 11 times whilst on station, was transferred to Courtmacsherry Harbour, serving there for another 18 years. Sold from service in 1988, the boat is under restoration in Whitby (July 2024).

The 1969 decision to withdraw the All-weather lifeboat was reversed in 1974. The station was re-established, but located at Macduff.

For later history, please see

- Macduff Lifeboat Station

== Whitehills lifeboats ==
=== Pulling and Sailing (P&S) lifeboats ===
ON (Note: ON is the RNLI's Official Number of the boat.)	Name	Built	On station	Class	Comments
479	George and Mary Berrey	1901	1924–1928	35-foot Self-righting (P&S)	(Note: 35-foot x 8-foot 6in (10-oared) self-righting (P&S) lifeboat, gift of Mrs M. Berrey of St Leonards-on-Sea, built by Thames Ironworks of Blackwall, London, costing £834.); Previously at Banff and Macduff.
606	George Gordon Moir	1910	1928–1932	35-foot Rubie Self-righting (P&S)	(Note: 35-foot x 8-foot 10in (10-oared) self-righting (P&S) lifeboat, legacy of Mrs S. A. Webb of Pimlico, built by Thames Ironworks of Blackwall, London, costing £1,095.); Previously at Kirkcudbright.

=== Motor lifeboats ===
ON	Name	Built	On station	Class	Comments
756	Civil Service No.4	1932	1932–1948	35-foot 6in Self-righting (motor)	
746	William Maynard	1931	1948–1949	35-foot 6in Self-righting (motor)	Formerly at Kirkcudbright.
706	Thomas Markby	1928	1949–1952	40-foot Self-righting (motor)	(Note: 40-foot x 10-foot 6in self-righting (motor) lifeboat, legacy of Mrs Markby, built by S. E. Saunders of Cowes, costng £6,559.); Previously at Swanage.
897	St. Andrew (Civil Service No.10)	1951	1952–1959	41-foot Watson	
716	Sarah Ward and William David Crossweller	1929	1959–1961	45-foot 6in Watson	Previously at Courtmacsherry Harbour.
959	Helen Wycherley	1961	1961–1969	47-foot Watson	

Station Closed, 1969

== See also ==
- List of RNLI stations
- List of former RNLI stations
- Royal National Lifeboat Institution lifeboats
