= Banff and Macduff Lifeboat Station =

Former RNLI lifeboat station in Aberdeenshire, Scotland

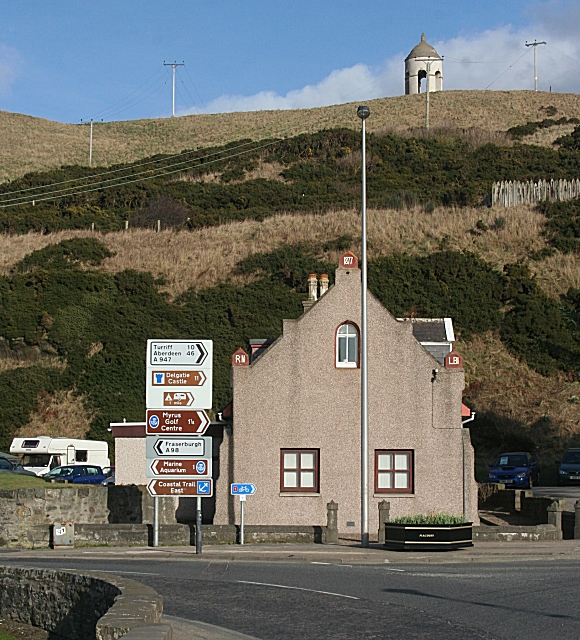
- 1877 Banff and Macduff Lifeboat Station

- Macduff, Scotland

General information
- Status: Closed
- Type: RNLI Lifeboat Station
- Location: Banff Bridge, Banff, Aberdeenshire, Scotland,
- Coordinates: 57°39′46.7″N 2°30′41.5″W
- Opened: 1860
- Closed: 1924

Banff and Macduff Lifeboat Station was initially located in Banff, a harbour town and former royal burgh overlooking Banff Bay, sitting across the River Deveron estuary from the town of Macduff, on the north coast of Aberdeenshire, historically Banffshire, in north-east Scotland.

A lifeboat station was established in Banff in 1860 by the Royal National Lifeboat Institution (RNLI). The station relocated across the River Deveron to Macduff in 1877.

Banff and Macduff Lifeboat Station officially closed in 1924, after the lifeboat had been operating for 2 years at Whitehills, some 2.5 miles (4.0 km) west of Banff.

== History ==
Ever since its founding in 1824, the Royal National Institution for the Preservation of Life from Shipwreck (RNIPLS), later to become the RNLI in 1854, would award medals for deeds of gallantry at sea, even if no lifeboats were involved.

On 26 November 1826, coastguards rescued the Master and eight crew from the ship Rival, wrecked at Pennan, whilst on passage from Riga to Belfast. Robert Burney, Chief Officer, H.M. Coastguard, Banff, was awarded the RNIPLS Silver Medal.

Twenty one years later, Lt. William Henry Woodham, RN, H.M. Coastguard, Banff, would be similarly rewarded with the RNIPLS Silver Medal, after saving the lives of crew and rescuers from the schooner Pearl of Nairn.

In June 1859, the RNLI put out the message that it was "desirous to extend its work of usefulness to the Coasts of Scotland...by the superintendence of an Honorary Committee of residents in each locality, who on their part undertake to collect locally what amount they are able of Donations towards the first Cost, and of Annual Contributions towards the permanent expenses of their several Establishments."

In response, Capt. MacDonald, Commander of H.M. Coastguard, Banff, wrote to the RNLI, and his letter and response was discussed at a meeting of the Banff Harbour Trustees in Dec 1859. By January 1860, generous funds and donations were already forthcoming, amounting to £100, and the RNLI agreed to provide a lifeboat. "Until recently this part of the coast of Scotland has been entirely unprovided with life-boats, and numerous lives have been lost which might probably have been saved had they been provided."

Banff Lifeboat Station was built at Banff Harbour, and according to the Banffshire Journal and General Advertiser of 4 September 1860, is noted as being a substantial granite building, about 40 feet long, and 18 feet wide within the walls, costing about £140.

A 30-foot self-righting 'Pulling and Sailing' (P&S) Peake-class lifeboat, one with sails and (6) oars, costing £180-9s-6d, was sent to the station in August 1860, along with a launching carriage, both transported free of charge by the Great Northern and other railway companies. The costs of the lifeboat was defrayed from the gift of £180 from Messrs. Macfie and Sons, sugar refiners from Liverpool.

The schooner Auchincruive ran aground off Banff harbour on 1 November 1861, whilst on passage from the River Spey to Grangemouth. The Banff lifeboat was launched, and the six crew members of the Auchincruive were rescued.

At a meeting of the local RNLI branch committee in July 1866, it was unanimously agreed that the lifeboat station should be moved to the east side of the River Deveron. Invitations to tender for the work were placed in the local newspaper on 31 July 1866. However, it would be eleven years later, in 1877, that a new boathouse would be constructed at Palmers Cove, next to Banff Bridge, prompted by storm damage to the foundations of the 1860 boathouse. The 1860 boathouse was demolished, with as much material as possible being used for the construction of the new one. During this period, the lifeboat John and Sara was stored in the grounds of Duff House.

On the 19th February 1900, the Banff lifeboat Help For The Helpless (ON 150) was launched to the aid of the barque Ebenezer of Porsgrunn. The vessel was on passage from Grimsby to Norway with a cargo of coal, when she was seen drifting towards shore, with her sails in ribbons. Before the lifeboat arrived, the vessel hit the rocks and broke up. Seven survivors were picked up by the lifeboat, and returned to shore. The lifeboat them returned to search for three more crew, but none of them were found.

The station was officially renamed Banff & Macduff Lifeboat Station in 1902, although it appears to have been known by that name in most publications since 1860.

On Sunday 11 February 1906, four fishermen from Crovie near Banff, all attired in their best Sunday clothes, put out in a salmon coble, and rescued five men from the S.S. Vigilant of Newcastle-upon-Tyne, when it was wrecked in a strong north-east gale. The four fishermen were each awarded the RNLI Silver Medal.

As World War I progressed, fewer and fewer lifeboat crew were available, having been called on service, and in 1917, Banff and Macduff Lifeboat Station closed temporarily, due to lack of crew. On 20 January 1922, the Banff and Macduff branch committee held their annual meeting on 20 January 1922, but a prior meeting was called by the RNLI executive committee, to discuss the difficulties being encountered at Banff and Macduff in finding a crew. The meeting of the local branch committee on 9 February 2023, indicated that a permanent crew had still to be found.

It is clear from the meeting reports of 1922 and 1923, that crewing difficulties were still being encountered at Banff and Macduff in 1923, and it now seems likely that Banff and Macduff Lifeboat Station at Banff Bridge was never reopened after World War I. In 1923, the Banff and Macduff lifeboat George and Mary Berrey (ON 479) was relocated to Whitehills Harbour on a one-year trial basis, purely by reason of there being an available crew.

At a meeting of the local RNLI branch committee on 12 December 1924, it was announced that the move to Whitehills was permanent. The new station was renamed Whitehills Lifeboat Station, and Banff and Macduff Lifeboat Station was officially closed.

The 1877 boathouse was placed for up for sale in December 1924, and was purchased by Banff Town Council for £135. The boathouse still stands, and on the front gable, there are three stones, marked 1877, RN and LBI (Royal National Life Boat Institution). For a while it was used as the Craigmyle tearoom, but is now a private residence.

In 1969, Whitehills Lifeboat Station was closed. Five years later, the decision was reversed, and a new station was established at Macduff in 1974.

For later history, please see:–

- Whitehills Lifeboat Station
- Macduff Lifeboat Station

== Station honours ==
The following are awards made at Banff.

- RNIPLS Silver Medal

Robert Burney, Chief Officer, HG.M. Coastguard, Banff – 1827

Lt. William Henry Woodham, RN, H.M. Coastguard, Banff – 1847

- RNLI Silver Medal

Francis (Rattie) Nicol, Fisherman – 1906
Francis (Frankie) Nicol, Fisherman – 1906
James Nicol, Fisherman – 1906
Alexander Watt, Fisherman – 1906

== Roll of honour ==
In memory of those lost whilst serving at Banff.

- Lost during the rescue of the crew of the schooner Pearl, 16 November 1847

John McDonald – 1847

== Station locations and names ==
Station Name	Location	Dates
Banff	Deveronside/High Shore	1860–1877
Banff	Banff Bridge	1877–1902
Banff and Macduff	Banff Bridge	1902–1917
Banff and Macduff	Whitehills	1923–1924

== Banff and Macduff lifeboats ==
=== Pulling and Sailing (P&S) lifeboats ===
ON (Note: ON is the RNLI's Official Number of the boat.)	Name	Built	On station	Class	Comments
Pre-363	Banff	1860	1860–1870	30-foot Peake Self-righting (P&S)	(Note: 30-foot x 7-foot (6-oared) Peake-class self-righting (P&S) lifeboat, gift of G. MacFie & Sons of Liverpool, built by Forrestt of Limehouse, London, costing £180.)
Pre-548	Banff	1870	1870–1872	32-foot Prowse Self-righting (P&S)	(Note: 32-foot x 7-foot 6in (10-oared) Prowse-class self-righting (P&S) lifeboat, gift of G. MacFie & Sons of Liverpool, built by Forrestt of Limehouse, London, costing £248.); Renamed John and Sarah in 1872.
Pre-548	John and Sarah	1870	1872–1888	32-foot Prowse Self-righting (P&S)	(Note: Gift of Mr Lightfoot of Accrington.)
150	Help For The Helpless	1888	1888–1902	34-foot Self-righting (P&S)	(Note: 34-foot x 7-foot 6in (10-oared) self-righting (P&S) lifeboat, legacy of Mrs E Bain of Blairlogie, built by Livie of Dundee, costing £377.)
479	George and Mary Berrey	1901	1902–1917	35-foot Self-righting (P&S)	(Note: 35-foot x 8-foot 6in (10-oared) self-righting (P&S) lifeboat, gift of Mrs M. Berrey of St Leonards-on-Sea, built by Thames Ironworks of Blackwall, London, costing £834.)
Station Closed 1917–1922
479	George and Mary Berrey	1901	1923–1924	35-foot Self-righting (P&S)	Located at Whitehills

Station Closed, 1924

Pre ON numbers are unofficial numbers used by the Lifeboat Enthusiast Society to reference early lifeboats not included on the official RNLI list.

== See also ==
- List of RNLI stations
- List of former RNLI stations
- Royal National Lifeboat Institution lifeboats
