= Macduff Lifeboat Station =

RNLI lifeboat station in Aberdeenshire, Scotland

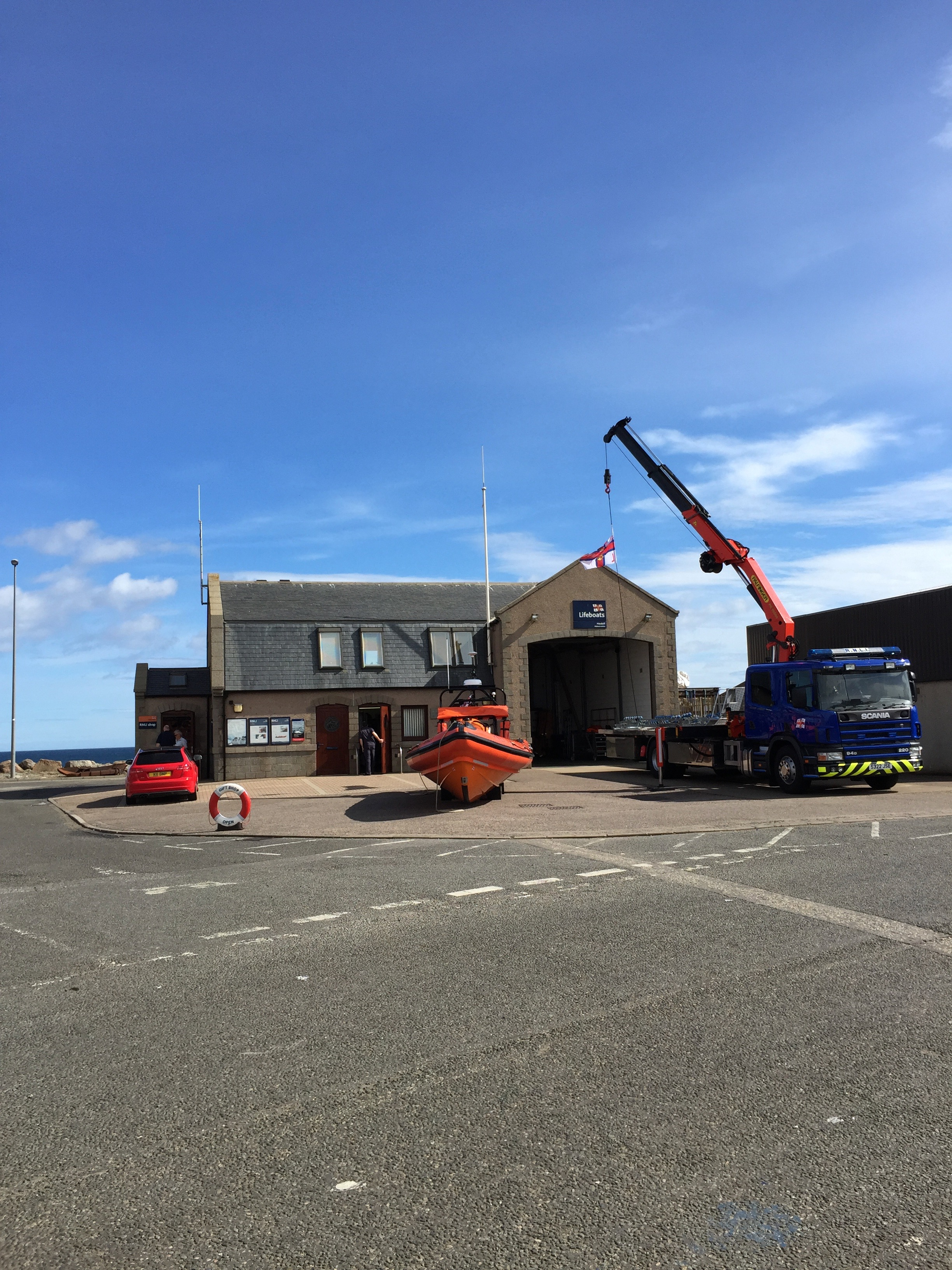
- Macduff Lifeboat Station with lifeboat Lydia Macdonald on display next to the Scania launch vehicle

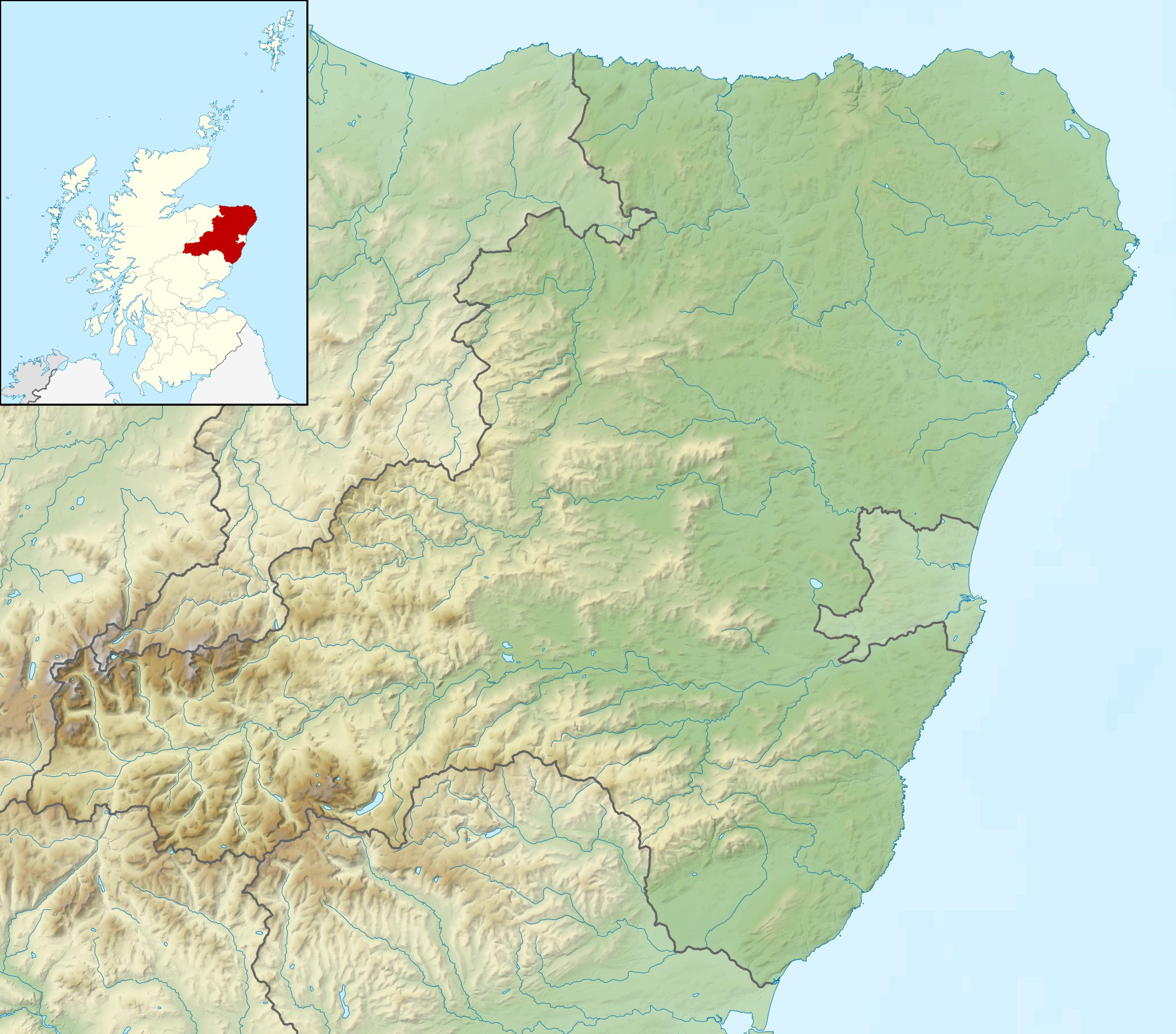
- Location within Aberdeenshire

General information
- Type: RNLI Lifeboat Station
- Location: Bankhead, Macduff, Aberdeenshire, Scotland AB44 1RD, UK
- Coordinates: 57°40′21.7″N 2°29′39.5″W
- Opened: 1974
- Owner: Royal National Lifeboat Institution

Website
- Macduff RNLI Lifeboat Station

Macduff Lifeboat Station is located on Bankhead in Macduff, a harbour town and former Royal Burgh, which sits on the eastern shore of the River Deveron, opposite Banff, Aberdeenshire on the western shore, overlooking Banff Bay in Aberdeenshire, historically Banffshire, in north-east Scotland.

A lifeboat station was established at Macduff by the Royal National Lifeboat Institution (RNLI) in 1974, although a lifeboat station in this part of Aberdeenshire has been sited in various locations locally since 1860.

The station currently operates a B-class (Atlantic 85) lifeboat, Skipasund (B-933), on station since 2022.

== History ==
In 1859, Capt. MacDonald, Commander of HM Coastguard at Banff, responded to the RNLI, who at the time were keen to place more lifeboats on the coast of Scotland. With the support of the Banff Harbour Trustees, he gained considerable support locally, and the RNLI established Banff Lifeboat Station in 1860.

The station was officially renamed Banff & Macduff Lifeboat Station in 1902, although it appears to have been known by that name in most publications since 1860.

In 1923, the Banff & Macduff lifeboat was relocated to Whitehills Harbour. The station name was changed to Whitehills Lifeboat Station in 1924.

After 45 years at Whitehills, and with lifeboat cover available at the flanking stations of Buckie and Fraserburgh, it was decided to withdraw the All-weather lifeboat, and Whitehills lifeboat station was closed in 1969.

For earlier history, please see –

- Banff and Macduff Lifeboat Station
- Whitehills Lifeboat Station

== 1974 onwards ==
Just five years after the closure of Whitehills lifeboat station, the decision to withdraw the All-weather lifeboat was reversed in 1974. However, instead of returning to Whitehills, a new station, Macduff Lifeboat Station, was established and located at Macduff. A twenty-year-old 52 ft (16 m) Barnett-class lifeboat lifeboat, James & Margaret Boyd (ON 913), previously on service at Stornoway for 19 years, was placed on service for a one year trial period.

In 1975, a 48-foot 6in Solent-class lifeboat was placed at the station. On a cold Saturday on 3 April 1975, a large crowd gathered at the Fishmarket at Macduff, for the official naming ceremony of Macduff's new lifeboat. The lifeboat was actually nearly two years old, and had served briefly in the Relief fleet, and at Kirkwall. The lifeboat had been funded by the Douglas Currie Trust, along with other donations from the estate of the late J. J. Davidson, and a gift from the Glasgow RNLI Ladies Guild.

The new lifeboat was handed to the care of Macduff lifeboat branch, accepted by George Mackay, Honorary Secretary, after which the lifeboat was named Douglas Currie (ON 1021) by Miss Caroline Currie, grand-niece of one of the principal donors.

More changes were to come at Macduff. In 1984, the All-weather lifeboat was transferred to Fraserburgh, and the station closed again briefly. The station was to become an Inshore lifeboat station, and the B-class (Atlantic 21) Inshore lifeboat Guide Friendship II (B-530) was placed on service in 1985.

The station is currently equipped with an B-class (Atlantic 85) lifeboat, Skipasund (B-933), funded by a donation from the Skipasund Foundation. Skipasund was officially handed over to the RNLI and named at a ceremony at the lifeboat station on 10 June 2023.

The launch & recovery system at Macduff is unique within the RNLI, being the only station where the boat is stored, launched and recovered from a 'mobile davit', which is essentially, a Flatbed truck with a HIAB crane.

== Station names and locations ==
Dates	Station name	Location	Comments
1860–1877	Banff	Deveronside/High Shore	
1877–1902	Banff	Banff Bridge	
1902–1923	Banff & Macduff	Banff Bridge	
1923–1924	Banff & Macduff	Whitehills	
1924–1969	Whitehills	Whitehills	(Note: Station closed 1969–1973)
1973–1984	Macduff	Macduff	(Note: Station closed 1984–1985)
1985–	Macduff	Macduff	(Note: Station reopened as an Inshore Lifeboat Station 1985)

== Macduff lifeboats ==
=== All-weather lifeboats ===
ON (Note: ON is the RNLI's Official Number of the boat.)	Op.No. (Note: Op.No. is the RNLI's Operational Number of the boat carried on the hull.)	Name	Built	On station	Class	Comments
913	–	James & Margaret Boyd	1954	1974–1975	52-foot Barnett (Mk.1)	Previously at Stornoway. Transferred to Invergordon.
1021	48-016	Douglas Currie	1973	1975–1984	Solent	First deployed in the Relief fleet. Previously at Kirkwall. Transferred to Fraserburgh.

All-weather lifeboat withdrawn in 1984

=== Inshore lifeboats ===
Op.No.	Name	On station	Class	Comments
B-530	Guide Friendship II	1985–1989	B-class (Atlantic 21)	
B-578	The Rotary Club of Glasgow	1989–2006	B-class (Atlantic 21)	
B-804	Lydia Macdonald	2006–2022	B-class (Atlantic 85)	
B-933	Skipasund	2022–	B-class (Atlantic 85)	

=== Launch and recovery vehicles ===
Op.No.	Reg.No.	Type	On station	Comments
SC01	S322 JSE	Scania Lorry and HIAB	1999–	

== See also ==
- List of RNLI stations
- List of former RNLI stations
- Royal National Lifeboat Institution lifeboats
