= Courtmacsherry Harbour Lifeboat Station =

RNLI lifeboat station in County Cork, Ireland

- Courtmacsherry Harbour Lifeboat Station in 2026

- Location within Ireland
- Former names: Courtmacsherry Lifeboat Station

General information
- Type: RNLI Lifeboat Station
- Location: Lifeboat Station, Sea Road, Courtmacsherry, County Cork, Ireland
- Coordinates: 51°38′05.8″N 08°42′33.4″W
- Opened: RNIPLS 1825–1840; RNLI 1867–present
- Owner: Royal National Lifeboat Institution

Website
- Courtmacsherry Harbour RNLI Lifeboat Station

Courtmacsherry Harbour Lifeboat Station is located on Sea Road, in the village of Courtmacsherry, County Cork, on the southern shore of the Argideen River estuary, approximately 45 kilometres (28 mi) south west of Cork, on the south coast of Ireland.

A lifeboat was placed at Courtmacsherry by the Royal National Institution for the Preservation of Life from Shipwreck (RNIPLS) in 1825, but is known to have been unfit for service by 1840. The station was re-established by the Royal National Lifeboat Institution (RNLI) in 1867.

Shannon-class lifeboat 13-45 Val Adnams (ON 1352)

The station currently operates 13-45 Val Adnams (ON 1352), a Shannon-class All-weather lifeboat, on station since 2023.

== History ==
In 1825, just one year after the formation of the RNLIPS, the views of H.M. Coastguard were sought on suitable locations for lifeboats. Capt. James D'Ombrain, Inspector General of the Irish Coastguard, recommended "that locations should be Arklow, Wicklow and Courtmacsherry, and that the boat should be of 26 feet in length". An order was placed with William Plenty of Newbury, Berkshire, and a lifeboat arrived at Courtmacsherry in December 1825.

With no proper management of the lifeboat, in 1929, the lifeboat was placed under the control of coastguard officer Lt. Rea, who undertook to maintain a crew. However, the boat was always exposed to the elements, rather than being kept in a boathouse, and although there are no records of service, it is known that the boat was no longer in service by 1840.

After this time, two services in local boats would earn coastguard officer Barnabus Edward Quadling both the RNIPLS Silver Medal in 1840, and for a service on 7 February 1842 to the vessel Latona, driven ashore and wrecked at Courtmacsherry, resulting in the rescue of 14 people, the RNIPLS Gold Medal.

In 1858, it was decided to re-establish a lifeboat station at Courtmacsherry, but although a lifeboat was ordered from Forrestt of Limehouse, it was then considered too small for Courtmacsherry, and was reallocated to Dover. It would be a further eight years before the situation was rectified, and a 32 ft (9.8 m) lifeboat, and its carriage, were ordered for Courtmacsherry.

In 1866, a tender of £171 was accepted from Edward Shannon to construct a boathouse, completed in 1867, which had doors at both ends to allow a launch over the beach, or to allow the boat and carriage to be transported elsewhere should that be required. A site at the end of the village was donated by the 'Ladies Boyle', Jane, Elizabeth and Charlotte, three of the daughters of Henry Boyle, 3rd Earl of Shannon. Funded by the 'City of Dublin Lifeboat Fund', a 32 ft (9.8 m) self-righting 'pulling and sailing' (P&S) lifeboat, one with oars and sails, was constructed by Woolfe of Shadwell. On 7 February 1867, the boat was paraded through the streets of Dublin, where a naming ceremony took place at Custom House Quay, the boat being named City of Dublin. Afterwards, the boat and carriage were transported to Bandon, County Cork free of charge by both the Great Southern and Western Railway, and the Cork, Bandon and South Coast Railway companies, finally establishing Courtmacsherry Lifeboat Station on 13 February 1867.

On passage from New York, to Queenstown, County Cork (Cobh), the barque General Caulfield was wrecked on 12 January 1879, when she ran aground on a sandbank in Courtmacsherry Bay. The City of Dublin lifeboat rescued all 18 crew.

In 1901, the station would receive the Kezia Gwilt (ON 467), a 37 ft (11 m) (12-oared) self-righting (P&S) lifeboat, built by Thames Ironworks. She was funded from the legacy of Alfred Gwilt, architect and wine merchant of Norbiton, London, and named after his wife Kezia.

To house the boat, a new boathouse was built at Barry's Point, some 5.6 kilometres (3.5 mi) south of Courtmacsherry, where the boat could launch directly into the sea, rather than the river estuary. A corrugated-iron lifeboat house was constructed on a concrete base, with a slipway made of karri timber, all at a cost of £1,300.

The French barque Faulconnier of Dunkirk would run aground on rocks at the Seven Heads, Travarra, whilst on passage from San Francisco to Queenstown (Cobh), on New Year's Day, 1904. A small local yawl put out, and rescued 15 of the 26 crew. On the return trip, the yawl capsized, but all aboard made it safely ashore. The Kezia Gwilt was launched, and in difficult condition, rescued the remaining 11 men.

On 15:00 on the fine calm day of 7 May 1915, the Kezia Gwilt was launched to the aid of a steamship in distress, some 12 nautical miles (22 km) off the Seven Heads. No wind meant no sails, and the crew rowed hard to the stricken vessel. On the journey, they encountered several ships crammed with survivors, and found out they were rowing to the ocean liner RMS Lusitania, torpedoed off the Old Head of Kinsale by German submarine U-20. She sank in just 17 minutes, with the loss of 1197 passengers and crew. Kezia Gwilt was the first rowed boat to arrive, and was met with a scene of devastation, with debris and wreckage everywhere. Too late to rescue any survivors, the crew assisted with the recovery of bodies, only departing at 20:40 and arriving back to Barry's Point at 01:00.

Courtmacsherry would receive their first motor-powered lifeboat in 1929, a non-self-righting 45-foot 6in Watson-class lifeboat, Sarah Ward and William David Crossweller (ON 716). The station had been closed temporarily in 1928, it is thought due to crew shortages. The Barry's Point station was closed, with the new boat stationed back at Courtmacsherry harbour, moored afloat, the station being renamed Courtmacsherry Harbour Lifeboat Station. Sarah Ward and William David Crossweller would serve Courtmacsherry Harbour during World War II. Although Ireland was neutral, the lifeboat played a part in rescuing crews from bombed or torpedoed vessels, making many calls and saving many lives. It is ironic therefore, that on 13 March 1945, the lifeboat was called to rescue the crew of German submarine U-260, scuttled after being damaged by a mine. The entire submarine crew were interned.

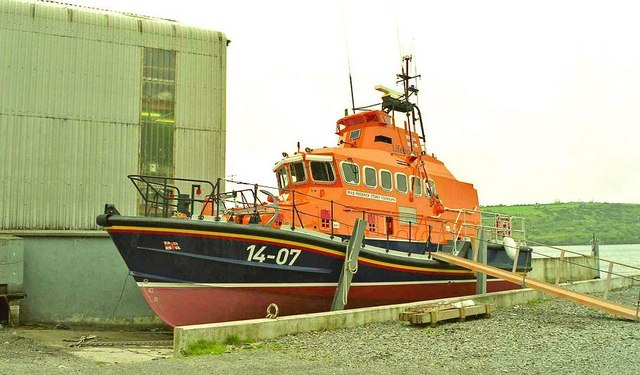
Trent-class All-weather lifeboat 14-07 Frederick Storey Cockburn (ON 1205) during maintenance

On 24 October 1998, the yacht Supertaff was badly damaged in 50–70 kn (93–130 km/h; 58–81 mph) knot winds, when she was capsized and demasted. A rescue helicopter was called, and the Courtmacsherry lifeboat Frederick Storey Cockburn was launched shortly after 19:55, arriving on scene at 21:05. It was quickly realised that an extraction of the crew by helicopter was impossible, and that the lifeboat was unable to get alongside due to the massive seas, and debris from the masts. A line was made to the vessel and tied to a liferaft. The three crew got aboard the liferaft, with some difficulty, and then cutting themselves free from the yacht, were hauled to the lifeboat at 22:00. All were landed at Courtmacsherry Harbour at 23:26. For this service, Second Coxswain Daniel O'Dwyer was awarded the RNLI Bronze Medal.

In 2023, Courtmacsherry Harbour said goodbye to the long-serving Trent-class lifeboat 14-07 Frederick Storey Cockburn (ON 1205), which had been on service for 28 years. A new €2.6million All-weather Shannon-class lifeboat was placed on service, 13-45 Val Adnams (ON 1352), which was named after, and by, the donor Val Adnams, now of Idaho, on 9 September 2023.

== Station honours ==
The following are awards made at Courtmacsherry Harbour:

- RNIPLS Gold Medal
  Barnabus Edward Quadling, Chief Officer, H.M. Coastguard, Courtmacsherry – 1842
- RNIPLS Silver Medal
  Barnabus Edward Quadling, Chief Officer, H.M. Coastguard, Courtmacsherry – 1840
- RNLI Silver Medal
  Maria Horsford – 1887
  Josephine Horsford – 1887
  William C. L. Sullivan – 1887
- RNLI Bronze Medal
  Daniel O'Dwyer, Second Coxswain – 1999
- 'The Thanks of the Institution inscribed on Vellum'
  Capt. C. G. Jones, Honorary Secretary – 1868
- 'A special framed certificate' (Fastnet Race)
  Coxswain and crew of the Courtmacsherry Harbour Lifeboat – 1979
- 'A Framed Letter of Thanks signed by the Chairman of the Institution'
  J. B. Madden, Acting Coxswain/Mechanic – 1981
  Colin Bateman, Assistant Mechanic – 1999
  Michael Cox, crew member – 1999
  Patrick Lawton, crew member – 1999
  Alan Locke, crew member – 1999
  Brian O'Donovan, crew member – 1999
  Michéal O'Donovan, crew member – 1999
  Dan O'Dwyer, Coxswain – 2002

== Courtmacsherry Harbour lifeboats ==
=== Pulling and Sailing (P&S) lifeboats ===
ON (Note: ON is the RNLI's Official Number of the boat.)	Name	Built	On station	Class	Comments
Pre-109	Unnamed	1825	1825–1829/40	26-foot Plenty	(Note: 26 ft 0 in (7.92 m) x 8 ft 6 in (2.59 m) (10-oared) Plenty-class non-self-righting lifeboat, built by William Plenty of Newbury, Berkshire, costing £150.); Known unserviceable by 1840.
Pre-492	City of Dublin	1867	1867–1885	32-foot Prowse self-righting (P&S)	(Note: 32 ft 0 in (9.75 m) x 7 ft 6 in (2.29 m) (10-oared) Prowse-class self-righting (P&S) lifeboat, funded by the City of Dublin LB fund, built by Woolfe of Shadwell, London, costing £249.); Broken up in 1886.
103	Farrant	1885	1885–1901	34-foot self-righting (P&S)	(Note: 34 ft 0 in (10.36 m) x 7 ft 6 in (2.29 m) (10-oared) self-righting (P&S) lifeboat, legacy of Mr R. A. M. Farrant of Bayswater, built by Woolfe of Shadwell, London, costing £300.); Sold in 1901.
467	Kezia Gwilt	1901	1901–1928	37-foot self-righting (P&S)	(Note: 37 ft 0 in (11.28 m) x 9 ft 3 in (2.82 m) (12-oared) self-righting (P&S) lifeboat, legacy of Mr A. Gwilt of Norbiton, built by Thames Ironworks of Blackwall, London, costing £888.); Sold in 1928.

Station closed, 1928–1929
Pre ON numbers are unofficial numbers used by the Lifeboat Enthusiasts' Society to reference early lifeboats not included on the official RNLI list.

=== All-weather lifeboats ===
ON	Op.No. (Note: Op.No. is the RNLI's Operational Number of the boat carried on the hull.)	Name	Built	On station	Class	Comments
716	–	Sarah Ward and William David Crossweller	1929	1929–1958	45-foot 6in Watson	Transferred to the Relief fleet, later at Whitehills.
801	–	Sir Arthur Rose	1938	1958–1969	46-foot Watson	Previously at Tobermory and Mallaig.
959	–	Helen Wycherley	1961	1969–1987	47-foot Watson	Previously at Whitehills.
1011	48-008	R. Hope Roberts	1969	1987–1993	Solent	First deployed at Rosslare Harbour.
1005	44-006	Arthur and Blanche Harris	1968	1993–1995	Waveney	First deployed at Barry Dock.
1205	14-07	Frederick Storey Cockburn	1995	1995–2023	Trent	Transferred to the Relief fleet, later at Holyhead.
1352	13-45	Val Adnams	2022	2023–	Shannon	

More post-service details can be found on the respective lifeboat class pages.

== See also ==
- List of RNLI stations
- List of former RNLI stations
- Royal National Lifeboat Institution lifeboats

== Sources ==
- Leonard, Richie; Denton, Tony (2025). Lifeboat Enthusiasts Handbook 2025. Lifeboats Enthusiasts' Society.
- Leonard, Richie; Denton, Tony (2026). Lifeboat Enthusiasts Handbook 2026. Lifeboats Enthusiasts' Society.
