= Kirkcudbright Lifeboat Station =

RNLI lifeboat station in Dumfries and Galloway, Scotland

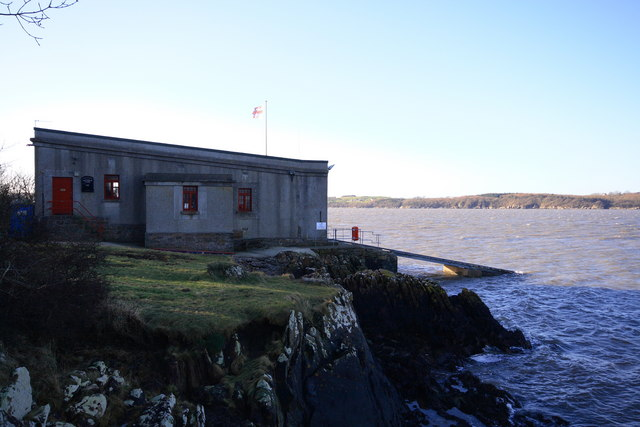
- Kirkcudbright Lifeboat Station

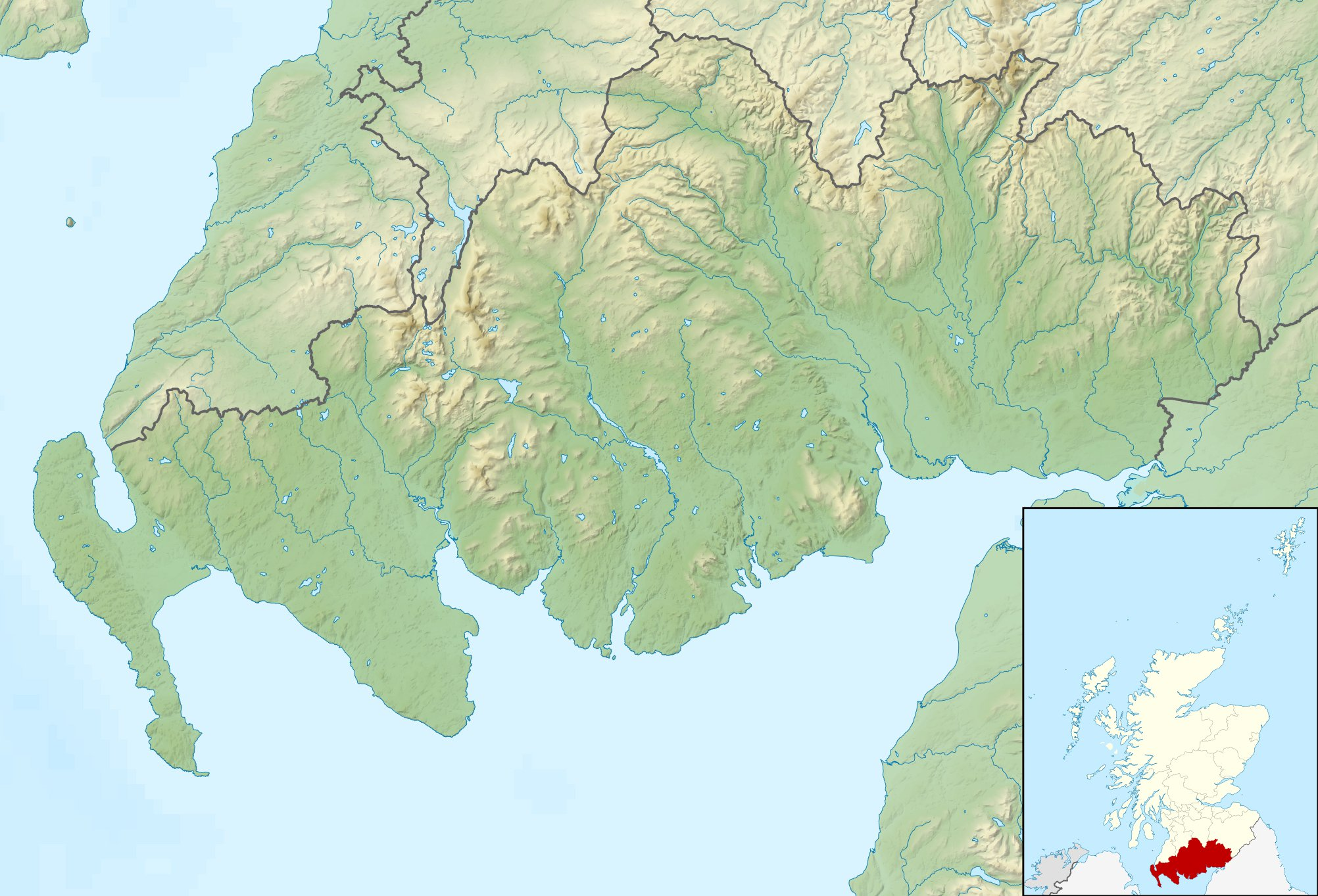
- Location within Dumfries and Galloway

General information
- Type: RNLI Lifeboat Station
- Location: Kirkcudbright Lifeboat Station, Torrs Shore, Kirkcudbright, Dumfries and Galloway, DG6 4XL, Scotland
- Coordinates: 54°47′40.8″N 4°03′44.7″W
- Opened: 1862
- Owner: Royal National Lifeboat Institution

Website
- Kirkcudbright RNLI Lifeboat Station

Kirkcudbright Lifeboat Station is located 3.5 miles (5.6 km) south of the town and royal burgh of Kirkcudbright, at the mouth of the River Dee, overlooking the Solway Firth, in the county of Dumfries and Galloway, Scotland.

A lifeboat was first stationed at Kirkcudbright by the Royal National Lifeboat Institution (RNLI) in 1862.

The station currently operates the B-class (Atlantic 85) Inshore lifeboat, George D Dow (B-952), on station since August 2026.

== History ==
At the meeting of the RNLI committee of management on 4 July 1861, a letter from Mr Samuel Cavan of Kirkcudbright, reported that a sum of money for a lifeboat and carriage, had been presented to the Port by a gentleman. The provision of both a lifeboat and carriage was agreed, and a branch of the RNLI was established in Kirkcudbright.

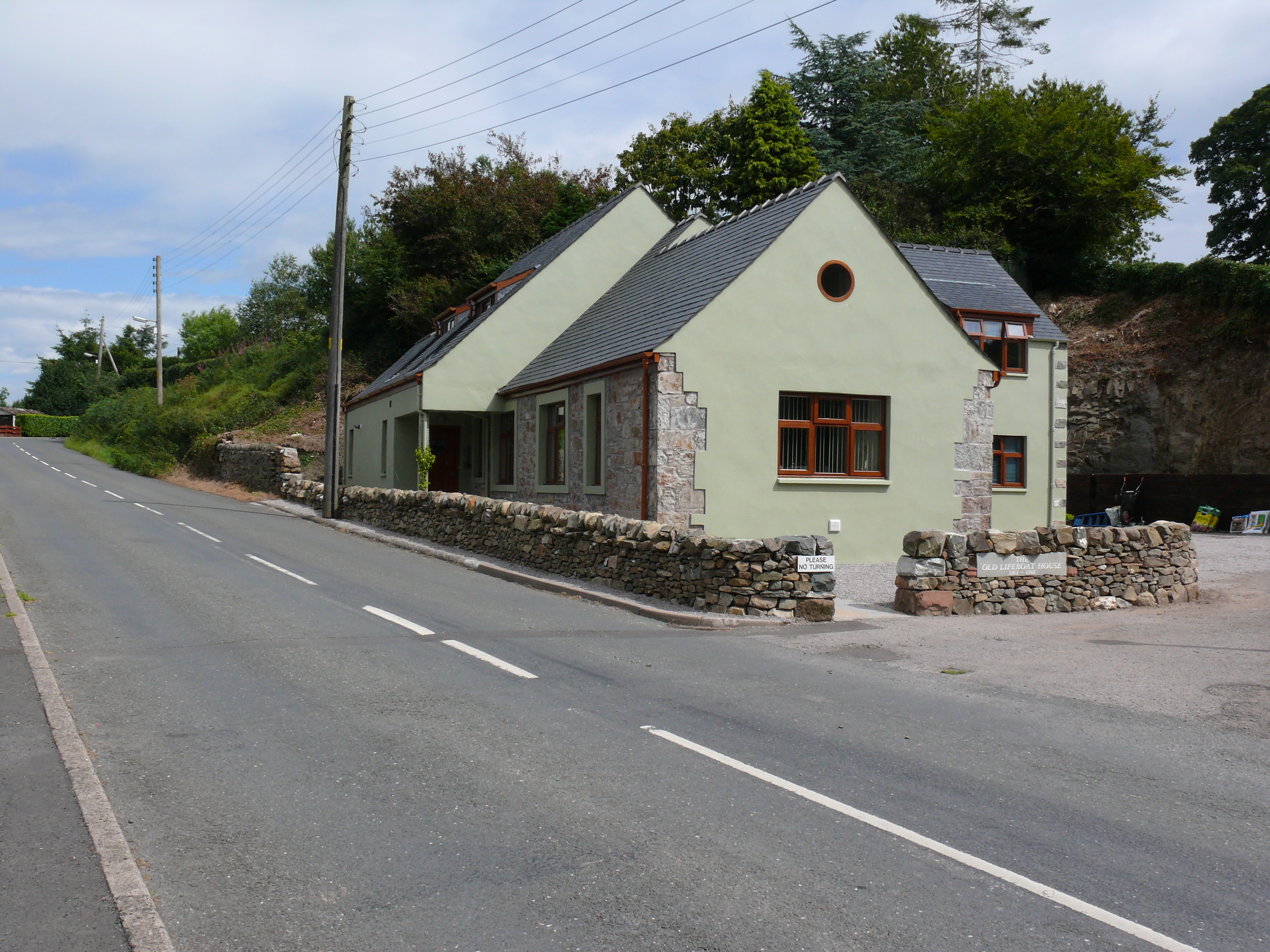
The Old Lifeboat House, Kirkcudbright

A boathouse was constructed in the town at Creekhead, at the top of St Cuthbert Street, at a cost of £144.

A 30 ft (9.1 m) self-righting 'Pulling and Sailing' (P&S) lifeboat, one with sails and six oars, costing £153, was sent to the station in 1862. Both lifeboat and carriage were transported by the London and North Western and the Glasgow and South Western Railway Companies to Castle Douglas, from where the boat was drawn on its carriage to Kirkcudbright. Provided by the anonymous gentleman "N. L.", the lifeboat was named Helen Lees.

The first recorded service was on the 13 November 1862, to the brig Ellen of Liverpool, driven ashore at the mouth of the River Dee. Three lives and the vessel were saved.

On 30 November 1868, the lifeboat was launched to the aid of the schooner William Henry of Belfast, on passage to Maryport, wrecked on St Mary's Isle. Five lives were saved.

In 1892, the lifeboat was relocated to Cutlers Pool. A new boathouse and slipway were constructed in 1893, at a cost of £1,200, whilst the old boathouse was sold for £20. The location meant that the crew would need to be transported to the edge of Lake Wood, and then would have to travel 1 mile (1.6 km) through woodland on foot, This was still a lot quicker to launch, then rowing out of the town harbour.

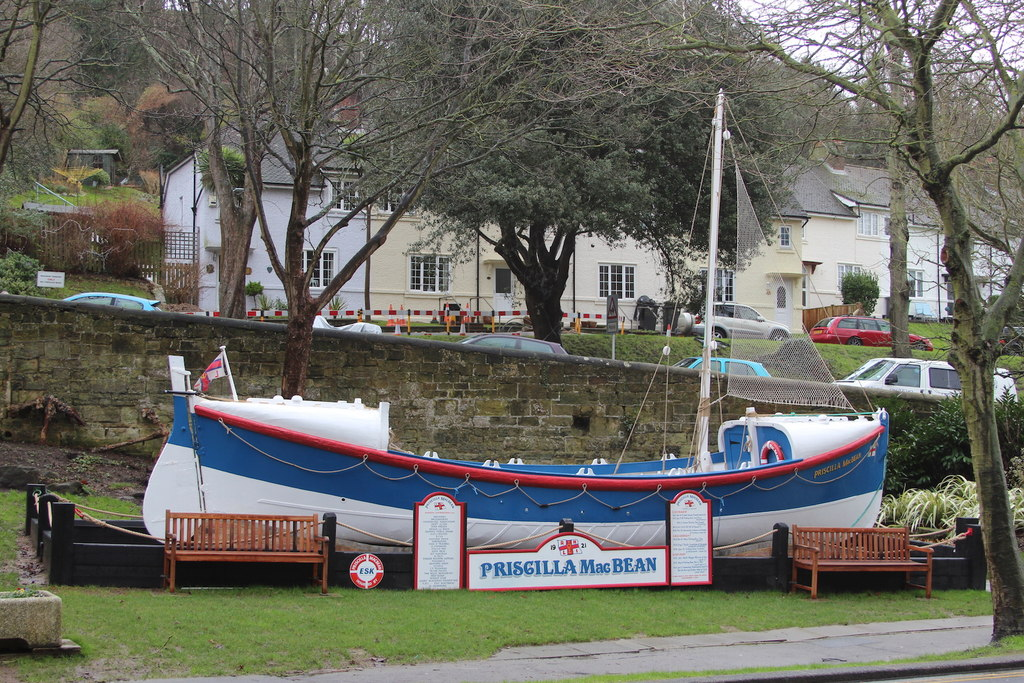
Priscilla MacBean on display in Hastings

On 29 February 1928, Kirkcudbright lifeboat crew set off to Maryport, to exchange their old pulling and sailing lifeboat, George Gordon Moir (ON 606), for a new prototype motor-powered lifeboat. After 11 hours struggle in heavy seas and strong headwinds, they returned home. Setting off in better conditions the following day, they rowed for 16 hours to reach Maryport. After an overnight at Maryport, they collected the Priscilla MacBean (ON 655), a legacy of Edward MacBean of Helensburgh, Glasgow. The return trip took just 3 hours.

A bottle washed up at West Preston Shore, Kirkbean on 14 October 1934, containing a message dated 7 October 1934. "We are stranded in Barlocco Caves. Rescue us quick or too late". The lifeboat was launched, but nobody was there.

The Mary Pullman (ON 981), a 37-foot Oakley-class lifeboat, would be the last "All-weather" lifeboat to serve at Kirkcudbright, arriving on service on 2 May 1965. In the next 24 years as Kirkcudbright lifeboat, she would be launched 89 times, and save 34 lives. By 1985, she was in need of repair, and sent for further repairs in 1987. It was decided to trial one of the fast B-class Inshore lifeboats at Kirkcudbright in July 1988, the first boat being (B-523), the former Littlehampton lifeboat Blue Peter 1, (the Blue Peter name being retained at Littlehampton).

Mary Pullman was formally withdrawn from service in 1989, and a permanent B-class (Atlantic 21) Peter and Grace Ewing (B-585) was placed at the station in 1991.

In June 2023, William John Collins, former lifeboat mechanic, now Kirkcudbright Lifeboat Operations Manager, received the British Empire Medal, awarded in the 2023 New Years Honours. Robert Ross, Senior Helm, Training Coordinator and member of Kirkcudbright lifeboat since 1983, received the 40-year long service award.

== Station honours ==
The following are awards made at Kirkcudbright:

- RNLI Silver Medal
  Andrew Lusk, farmer – 1865
- Bronze Medal, awarded by the Royal Humane Society
  George Parkhill – 1908
- 'The Thanks of the Institution inscribed on Vellum'
  George Cossar Davidson DSM BEM, Coxswain/Mechanic – 1976
  Stephen Unsworth, Acting Coxswain/Mechanic – 1985
- Queen Elizabeth II Silver Jubilee Medal
  George Cossar Davidson DSM BEM, Coxswain/Mechanic – 1977
- British Empire Medal
  William John Collins, Lifeboat Operations Manager – 2023NYH

== Kirkcudbright lifeboats ==
=== Pulling and Sailing (P&S) lifeboats ===
ON (Note: ON is the RNLI's Official Number of the boat.)	Name	Built	On station	Class	Comments
Pre-392	Helen Lees	1862	1862−1879	30-foot Peake self-righting (P&S)	(Note: 30 ft 0 in (9.14 m) x 6 ft 8 in (2.03 m) (6-oared) Peake-class self-righting (P&S) lifeboat, the anonymous gift of 'N.L.' of Manchester, built by Forrestt of Limehouse, London, costing £154.)Declared unfit in 1879, and sawn through.
Pre-494	Mackie	1867	1879−1887	32-foot Prowse self-righting (P&S)	(Note: 32 ft 0 in (9.75 m) x 7 ft 6 in (2.29 m) (10-oared) Prowse-class self-righting (P&S) lifeboat, legacy of Dr. Mackie of Greenock, built by Woolfe of Shadwell, London, costing £248 when new.); Previously Lily at New Brighton. Sold in 1889.
156	Unnamed	1887	1887−1888	34-foot self-righting (P&S)	(Note: 34 ft 0 in (10.36 m) x 7 ft 6 in (2.29 m) (10-oared) self-righting (P&S) lifeboat, funded by the RNLI, built by Watkins of Blackwall, London, costing £362.); Named Hugh and Ann in 1888.
156	Hugh and Ann	1887	1888−1910	34-foot self-righting (P&S)	(Note: Legacy of Mrs S. A. Ferguson of Bath.); Broken up in January 1911.
606	George Gordon Moir	1910	1910−1928	35-foot Rubie self-righting (P&S)	(Note: 35 ft 0 in (10.67 m) x 8 ft 10 in (2.69 m) (10-oared) Rubie self-righting (P&S) lifeboat, legacy of Mrs S. A. Webb of Pimlico, built by Thames Ironworks of Blackwall, London, costing £1,095.); Transferred to Whitehills.

Pre ON numbers are unofficial numbers used by the Lifeboat Enthusiast Society to reference early lifeboats not included on the official RNLI list.

=== Motor lifeboats ===
ON	Op.No. (Note: Op.No. is the RNLI's Operational Number of the boat carried on the hull.)	Name	Built	On station	Class	Comments
655	–	Priscilla MacBean	1921	1928−1931	35-foot self-righting (motor)	(Note: 35 ft 0 in (10.67 m) x 8 ft 6 in (2.59 m) self-righting (motor) lifeboat, legacy of Mr Macbean, built by J. Samuel White of Cowes, costing £6,623.); Previously at Eastbourne. Transferred to Maryport.
741	–	Morison Watson	1931	1931−1953	35-foot 6in self-righting (motor)	
872	–	J. B. Couper of Glasgow	1949	1953−1965	Liverpool	Previously at St Abbs. Transferred to Youghal.
981	37-14	Mary Pullman	1964	1965−1989	Oakley	All-weather lifeboat withdrawn, 1989

More post-service details can be found on the respective lifeboat class pages.

=== Inshore lifeboats ===
Op.No.	Name	On station	Class	Comments
B-523	Unnamed	1988	B-class (Atlantic 21)	Previously Blue Peter I at Littlehampton
B-525	Unnamed	1988–1991	B-class (Atlantic 21)	
B-585	Peter and Grace Ewing	1991–2006	B-class (Atlantic 21)	
B-814	Sheila Stenhouse	2006–2008	B-class (Atlantic 85)	
B-718	Rotaract I	2008–2009	B-class (Atlantic 75)	
B-814	Sheila Stenhouse	2009–2026	B-class (Atlantic 85)	
B-952	George D Dow	2026–	B-class (Atlantic 85)	

== See also ==
- List of RNLI stations
- List of former RNLI stations
- Royal National Lifeboat Institution lifeboats
- Talus Atlantic 85 DO-DO launch carriage
