= Solent-class lifeboat =

Former RNLI lifeboat class

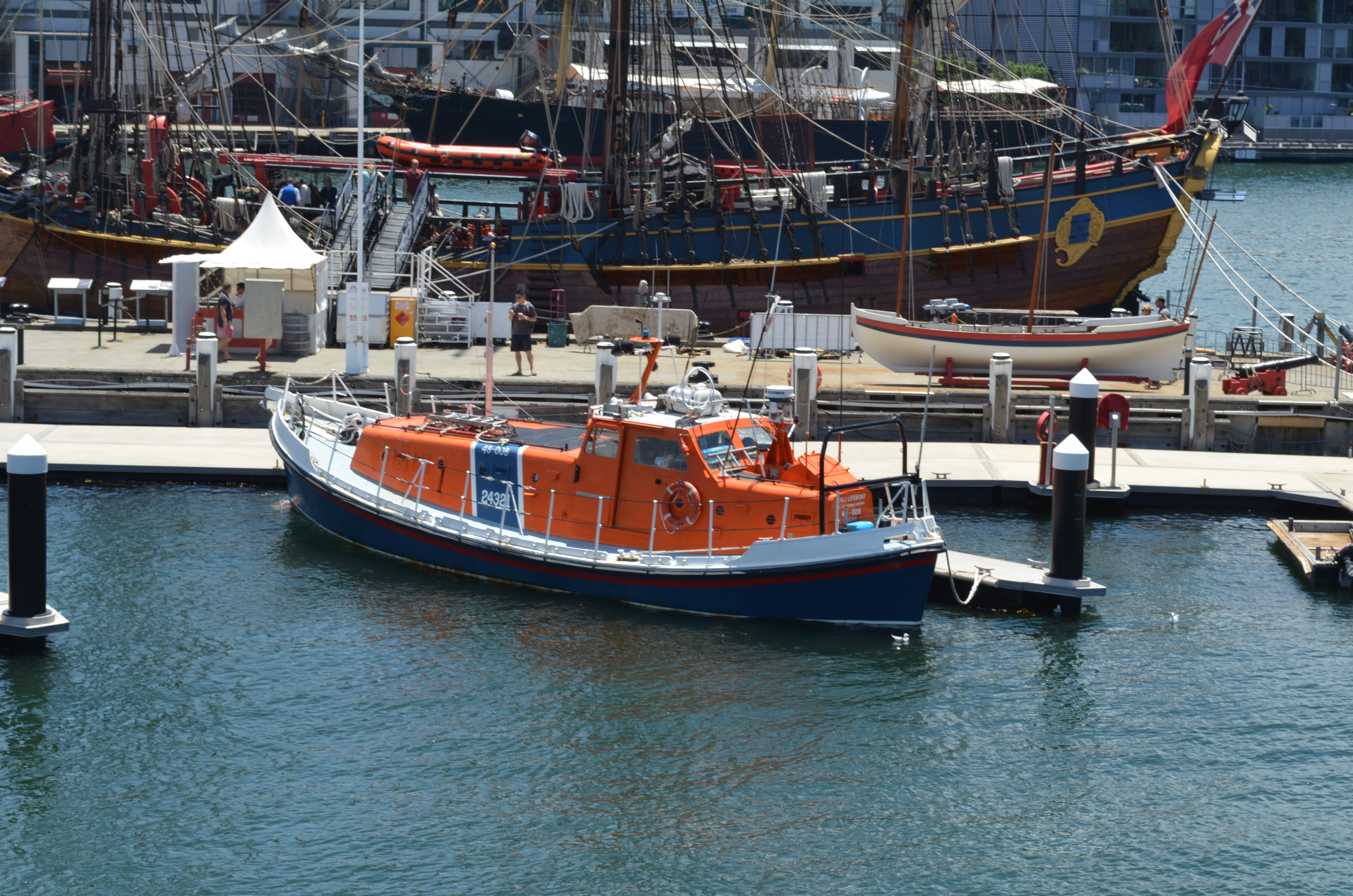
- Sea Guardian, formerly R. Hope Roberts (ON 1011) at Australian National Maritime Museum, 2015

Class overview
- Builders: Groves & Guttridge, Cowes; Camper & Nicholson, Gosport
- Operators: RNLI; ADES Uruguay; SAR Tallinn, Estonia
- Preceded by: Watson
- Succeeded by: Tyne
- Built: 1969–1973
- In service: 1969–2021
- Completed: 11
- Retired: 11

General characteristics
- Type: motor lifeboat
- Displacement: 27 tons
- Length: 48 ft 6 in (14.78 m)
- Beam: 14 ft (4.3 m)
- Draught: 4 ft 8 in (1.42 m)
- Propulsion: 2 x 110 bhp Gardner 6LX diesel engines
- Speed: 9.5 knots (10.9 mph)
- Range: 150 nautical miles (280 km)
- Crew: 7

The Solent-class lifeboat is a steel-hulled version of the 48-foot-6-inch (14.78 m) Oakley-class self-righting lifeboat and is sometimes referred to as the 48-foot, 6-inch Oakley-class Mark III. Solent Operational Numbers followed on from the first three 48-foot, 6-inch Oakleys and were interrupted by the last two Oakleys (48-12) and (48-13). The operational numbers of the Solent-class had three digits in the suffix to indicate a metal hull (as with Clyde, Waveney, Thames and Tyne classes, one Arun class and the first eleven Merseys). Two digits indicates a wooden, glass-reinforced plastic or fiber-reinforced composite hull.

== Description ==
The Solent was powered by twin 110 bhp Gardner 6LX diesel engines which gave the boat a top speed of 9.5 knots (17.6 km/h; 10.9 mph). There were twin spade rudders installed which were coupled to Mathway manual steering gear.

Apart from the steel hull, the Solent-class differed from the Oakley-class in its self-righting mechanism. The Oakley used a water ballast system, while the Solent class was inherently self-righting as a result of its watertight superstructure. The Solent was the last class of traditional displacement-type lifeboats designed by the Royal National Lifeboat Institution.

There were two versions of the Solent, unofficially known as "Mark I" and "Mark II". The "Mark I" boats have a vertical steering wheel. Sliding doors provide access to the forward end of the wheelhouse on each side. The "Mark II" boats have a seated steering position with hinged wheelhouse doors at the after end of the wheelhouse. These boats entered service in 1972.

The first four Solent-class boats (ON 1007 – ON 1010) and the last three (ON 1019 - ON 1021) were built by Groves & Guttridge at Cowes. The second four (ON 1011 – ON 1014) were built by Camper & Nicholson at Gosport.

== RNLI fleet ==
ON (Note: ON is the RNLI's Official Number of the boat.)	Op. No. (Note: Op. No. is the RNLI's Operational Number of the boat carried on the hull.)	Name	Built	In service	Station	Comments
1007	48-004	George Urie Scott	1969	1969–1978	Lochinver	(Note: 48 ft 6 in (14.78 m) x 14 ft 0 in (4.27 m) Solent-class lifeboat, gift of Mrs Scott, built by Groves and Guttridge of Cowes, with twin 110-hp Gardner 6LX engines, costing £70,000.) Sold 1990. Renamed Lunga and Blue Highlander. Now named Highlander, at Ameland, NL, September 2025
1007	48-004	George Urie Scott	1969	1979–1984	Rosslare Harbour	Sold 1990. Renamed Lunga and Blue Highlander. Now named Highlander, at Ameland, NL, September 2025
1007	48-004	George Urie Scott	1969	1985–1989	Lochinver	Sold 1990. Renamed Lunga and Blue Highlander. Now named Highlander, at Ameland, NL, September 2025
1007	48-004	George Urie Scott	1969	1989–1990	Relief fleet	Sold 1990. Renamed Lunga and Blue Highlander. Now named Highlander, at Ameland, NL, September 2025
1008	48-005	James and Mariska Joicey	1969	1969–1986	Peterhead	(Note: 48 ft 6 in (14.78 m) x 14 ft 0 in (4.27 m) Solent-class lifeboat, legacy of Mrs Joicey, built by Groves and Guttridge of Cowes, with twin 110-hp Gardner 6LX engines, costing £65,000.) Sold 1990. Renamed Mariska, Mirage of Dart and Thee Hearts. Restored 2014–2021 as James and Mariska Joicey . At Restonguet Creek, Mylor, Cornwall, December 2025.
1008	48-005	James and Mariska Joicey	1969	1987–1988	The Lizard	Sold 1990. Renamed Mariska, Mirage of Dart and Thee Hearts. Restored 2014–2021 as James and Mariska Joicey . At Restonguet Creek, Mylor, Cornwall, December 2025.
1008	48-005	James and Mariska Joicey	1969	1988–1990	Relief fleet	Sold 1990. Renamed Mariska, Mirage of Dart and Thee Hearts. Restored 2014–2021 as James and Mariska Joicey . At Restonguet Creek, Mylor, Cornwall, December 2025.
1009	48-006	Jack Shayler and the Lees	1970	1970–1987	Bembridge	(Note: 48 ft 6 in (14.78 m) x 14 ft 0 in (4.27 m) Solent-class lifeboat, legacies of Miss Shayler and Mr Lees, and RNLI funds, built by Groves and Guttridge of Cowes, with twin 110-hp Gardner 6LX engines, costing £59,323.) Sold June 1994. Renamed Anne with SAR Tallinn, Estonia. See below:–
1009	48-006	Jack Shayler and the Lees	1970	1988	Dunbar	Sold June 1994. Renamed Anne with SAR Tallinn, Estonia. See below:–
1009	48-006	Jack Shayler and the Lees	1970	1989	Wicklow	Sold June 1994. Renamed Anne with SAR Tallinn, Estonia. See below:–
1009	48-006	Jack Shayler and the Lees	1970	1989–1993	Relief fleet	Sold June 1994. Renamed Anne with SAR Tallinn, Estonia. See below:–
1010	48-007	David and Elizabeth King and E. B.	1970	1970–1988	Longhope	(Note: 48 ft 6 in (14.78 m) x 14 ft 6 in (4.42 m) Solent-class lifeboat, legacy of Miss King, and an anonymous donor, built by Groves and Guttridge of Cowes, with twin 110-hp Gardner 6LX engines, costing £59,323.) Sold 1990. Renamed Island Lass and Storm. Now in unaltered condition bearing original name at Glasson Dock, Lancashire, August 2025.
1010	48-007	David and Elizabeth King and E. B.	1970	1988–1989	Invergordon	Sold 1990. Renamed Island Lass and Storm. Now in unaltered condition bearing original name at Glasson Dock, Lancashire, August 2025.
1010	48-007	David and Elizabeth King and E. B.	1970	1989–1990	Relief fleet	Sold 1990. Renamed Island Lass and Storm. Now in unaltered condition bearing original name at Glasson Dock, Lancashire, August 2025.
1011	48-008	R. Hope Roberts	1969	1969–1978	Rosslare Harbour	(Note: 48 ft 6 in (14.78 m) x 14 ft 0 in (4.27 m) Solent-class lifeboat, legacies of Mrs Ronald, Mrs Hope and Mrs Roberts, plus an anonymous gift, built by Camper Nicholson of Gosport, with twin 110-hp Gardner 6LX engines, costing £70,000.) Sold 1993. Renamed ANL Sea Guardian. Now named Sea Guardian at Gold Coast City Marina, Queensland, Aus., March 2024.
1011	48-008	R. Hope Roberts	1969	1979–1985	Fraserburgh	Sold 1993. Renamed ANL Sea Guardian. Now named Sea Guardian at Gold Coast City Marina, Queensland, Aus., March 2024.
1011	48-008	R. Hope Roberts	1969	1985–1987	Galway Bay	Sold 1993. Renamed ANL Sea Guardian. Now named Sea Guardian at Gold Coast City Marina, Queensland, Aus., March 2024.
1011	48-008	R. Hope Roberts	1969	1987	Relief fleet	Sold 1993. Renamed ANL Sea Guardian. Now named Sea Guardian at Gold Coast City Marina, Queensland, Aus., March 2024.
1011	48-008	R. Hope Roberts	1969	1987–1993	Courtmacsherry Harbour	Sold 1993. Renamed ANL Sea Guardian. Now named Sea Guardian at Gold Coast City Marina, Queensland, Aus., March 2024.
1012	48-009	City of Birmingham	1970	1970–1983	Exmouth	(Note: 48 ft 6 in (14.78 m) x 14 ft 0 in (4.27 m) Solent-class lifeboat, funded by the City of Birmingham Lifeboat Appeal, built by Camper Nicholson of Gosport, with twin 110-hp Gardner 6LX engines, costing £72,000.) Sold July 1995; Renamed ADES 14 with ADES Uruguay. See below:–
1012	48-009	City of Birmingham	1970	1984–1993	Walton and Frinton	Sold July 1995; Renamed ADES 14 with ADES Uruguay. See below:–
1012	48-009	City of Birmingham	1970	1993–1994	Relief fleet	Sold July 1995; Renamed ADES 14 with ADES Uruguay. See below:–
1013	48-010	The Royal British Legion Jubilee	1970	1970–1978	Relief Fleet	(Note: 48 ft 6 in (14.78 m) x 14 ft 0 in (4.27 m) Solent-class lifeboat, funded by the Royal British Legion, built by Camper Nicholson of Gosport, with twin 110-hp Gardner 6LX engines, costing £72,000.) Sold April 1990. Renamed Ocean Jubilee, restored in Wakefield. Later renamed The Royal British Legion Jubilee but broken up in Knottingley, December 2020.
1013	48-010	The Royal British Legion Jubilee	1970	1979–1979	Fraserburgh	Sold April 1990. Renamed Ocean Jubilee, restored in Wakefield. Later renamed The Royal British Legion Jubilee but broken up in Knottingley, December 2020.
1013	48-010	The Royal British Legion Jubilee	1970	1979–1986	Relief fleet	Sold April 1990. Renamed Ocean Jubilee, restored in Wakefield. Later renamed The Royal British Legion Jubilee but broken up in Knottingley, December 2020.
1013	48-010	The Royal British Legion Jubilee	1970	1986–1988	Peterhead	Sold April 1990. Renamed Ocean Jubilee, restored in Wakefield. Later renamed The Royal British Legion Jubilee but broken up in Knottingley, December 2020.
1013	48-010	The Royal British Legion Jubilee	1970	1988–1990	Relief fleet	Sold April 1990. Renamed Ocean Jubilee, restored in Wakefield. Later renamed The Royal British Legion Jubilee but broken up in Knottingley, December 2020.
1014	48-011	The Three Sisters	1970	1970–1988	{Thurso	(Note: 48 ft 6 in (14.78 m) x 14 ft 0 in (4.27 m) Solent-class lifeboat, an anonymous gift, built by Camper Nicholson of Gosport, with twin 110-hp Gardner 6LX engines, costing £65,000.) Sold April 1990. October 2018, Heavily converted cruiser, at Turnchapel, Plymouth, April 2025.
1014	48-011	The Three Sisters	1970	1988–1989	Wicklow	Sold April 1990. October 2018, Heavily converted cruiser, at Turnchapel, Plymouth, April 2025.
1014	48-011	The Three Sisters	1970	1989–1990	Relief fleet	Sold April 1990. October 2018, Heavily converted cruiser, at Turnchapel, Plymouth, April 2025.
1019	48-014	Lady MacRobert	1972	1972–1989	Montrose	(Note: 48 ft 6 in (14.78 m) x 14 ft 0 in (4.27 m) Solent-class lifeboat, gift of 'The MacRobert Trust', built by Groves and Guttridge of Cowes, with twin 110-hp Gardner 6LX engines, costing £73,000.) Sold March 1994. Renamed ADES 12 with ADES Uruguay. See below:–
1019	48-014	Lady MacRobert	1972	1989–1993	Relief fleet	Sold March 1994. Renamed ADES 12 with ADES Uruguay. See below:–
1020	48-015	Hugh William Viscount Gough	1973	1973–1984	Stornoway	(Note: 48 ft 6 in (14.78 m) x 14 ft 0 in (4.27 m) Solent-class lifeboat, gift of the Dowager Viscountess Gough and the Viscount Gough, built by Groves and Guttridge of Cowes, with twin 110-hp Gardner 6LX engines, costing £73,000.) Sold September 1993. Unaltered pleasure boat at Puteri Harbour Marina, Johor Bahru, Malaysia, September 2021. Last reported under restoration at Miri, Malaysia, January 2026.
1020	48-015	Hugh William Viscount Gough	1973	1984–1988	Barra Island	Sold September 1993. Unaltered pleasure boat at Puteri Harbour Marina, Johor Bahru, Malaysia, September 2021. Last reported under restoration at Miri, Malaysia, January 2026.
1020	48-015	Hugh William Viscount Gough	1973	1988–1993	Dunbar	Sold September 1993. Unaltered pleasure boat at Puteri Harbour Marina, Johor Bahru, Malaysia, September 2021. Last reported under restoration at Miri, Malaysia, January 2026.
1021	48-016	Douglas Currie	1973	1973–1974	Relief fleet	(Note: 48 ft 6 in (14.78 m) x 14 ft 0 in (4.27 m) Solent-class lifeboat, gift of 'The Douglas Currie Trust' and the legacy of Mr Davidson, built by Groves and Guttridge of Cowes, with twin 110-hp Gardner 6LX engines, costing £65,113.) Sold 1992. Renamed Leon del Mar and Solent Sea Lion. Now in unaltered condition as Douglas Currie at Fraserburgh, Scotland, June 2025.
1021	48-016	Douglas Currie	1973	1974–1975	Kirkwall	Sold 1992. Renamed Leon del Mar and Solent Sea Lion. Now in unaltered condition as Douglas Currie at Fraserburgh, Scotland, June 2025.
1021	48-016	Douglas Currie	1973	1975–1984	Macduff	Sold 1992. Renamed Leon del Mar and Solent Sea Lion. Now in unaltered condition as Douglas Currie at Fraserburgh, Scotland, June 2025.
1021	48-016	Douglas Currie	1973	1985	Fraserburgh	Sold 1992. Renamed Leon del Mar and Solent Sea Lion. Now in unaltered condition as Douglas Currie at Fraserburgh, Scotland, June 2025.
1021	48-016	Douglas Currie	1973	1986–1989	Portpatrick	Sold 1992. Renamed Leon del Mar and Solent Sea Lion. Now in unaltered condition as Douglas Currie at Fraserburgh, Scotland, June 2025.
1021	48-016	Douglas Currie	1973	1990–1992	Workington	Sold 1992. Renamed Leon del Mar and Solent Sea Lion. Now in unaltered condition as Douglas Currie at Fraserburgh, Scotland, June 2025.

== Other fleets ==
RNLI ON (Note: ON is the RNLI's Official Number of the boat.)	Name	Built	In service	Station	Comments
1009	Anne (SAR Tallinn, Estonia)	1970	1994–2006	Tallinn	Retired 2006? Believed broken up 2021.
1012	ADES 14 ILC 95 (ADES Uruguay)	1970	1995–2015	Montevideo	Retired 2015. Sold as a workboat, last seen in storage near Montevideo, December 2022.
1019	ADES 12 (ADES Uruguay)	1972	1994–2021	Punta del Este	Retired 2021. For sale at Punta del Este, December 2024.
