= Fraserburgh Lifeboat Station =

RNLI lifeboat station in Aberdeenshire, Scotland

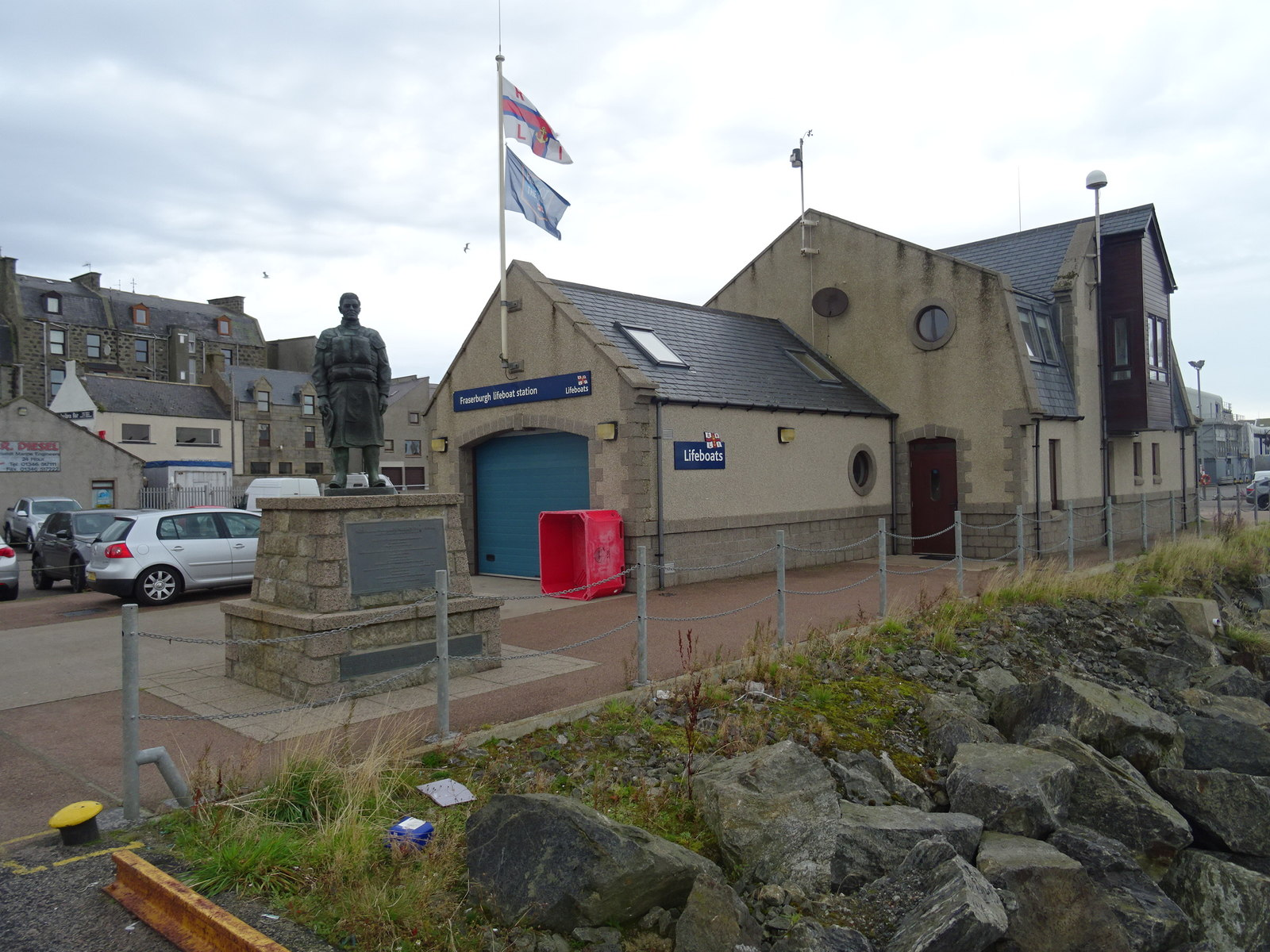
- Fraserburgh Lifeboat Station

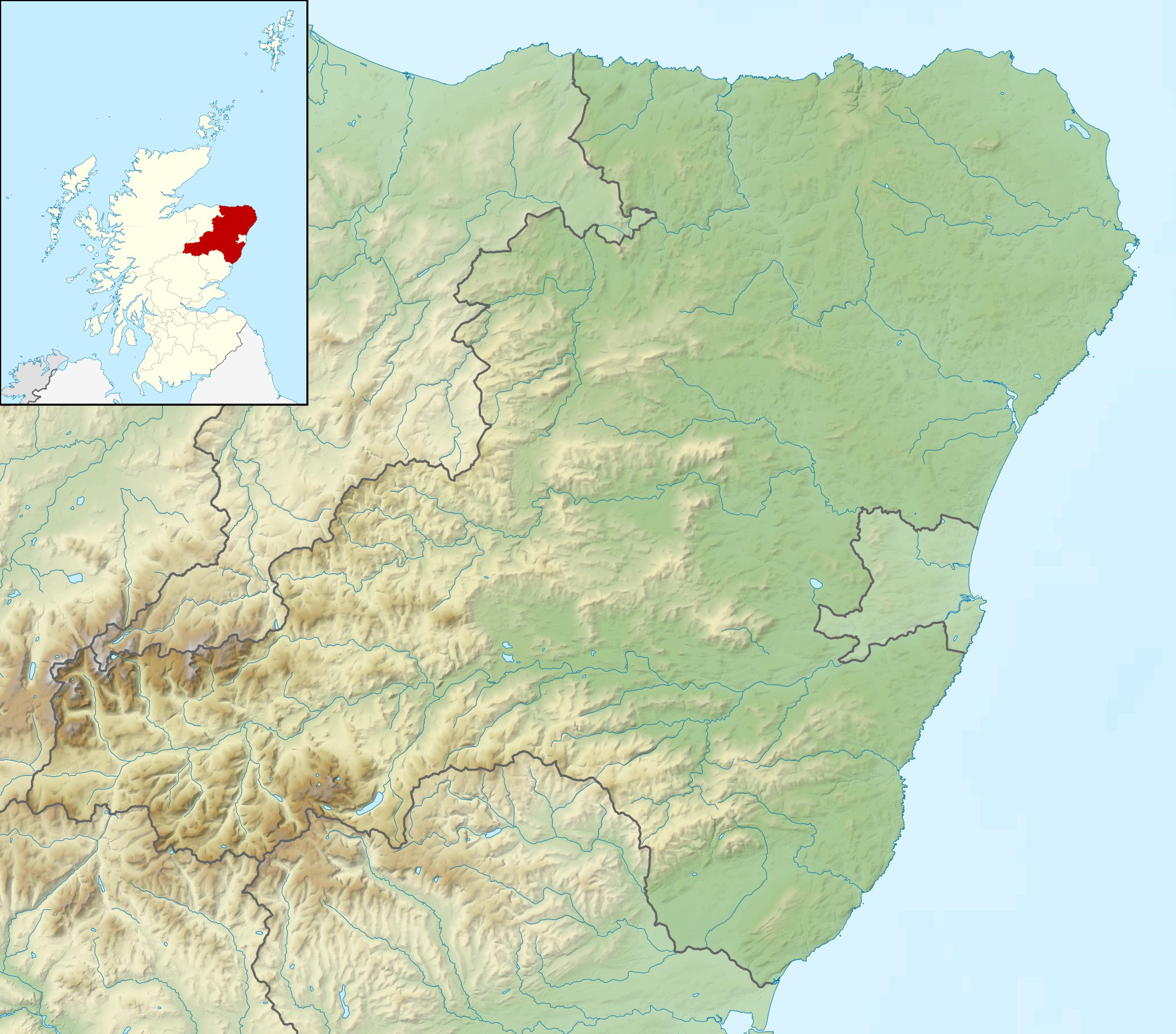
- Location within Aberdeenshire

General information
- Type: RNLI Lifeboat Station
- Location: Shore St, Fraserburgh, Aberdeenshire, AB43 9BR, Scotland
- Coordinates: 57°41′37.0″N 2°00′10.0″W
- Opened: 1805 FHC; 1858 RNLI
- Owner: Royal National Lifeboat Institution

Website
- Fraserburgh RNLI Lifeboat Station

Fraserburgh Lifeboat Station is located in the harbour town of Fraserburgh, in the north-east corner of Aberdeenshire, Scotland.

A lifeboat was first stationed at Fraserburgh in 1806, later becoming the first Scottish station of the Royal National Lifeboat Institution (RNLI), in 1858.

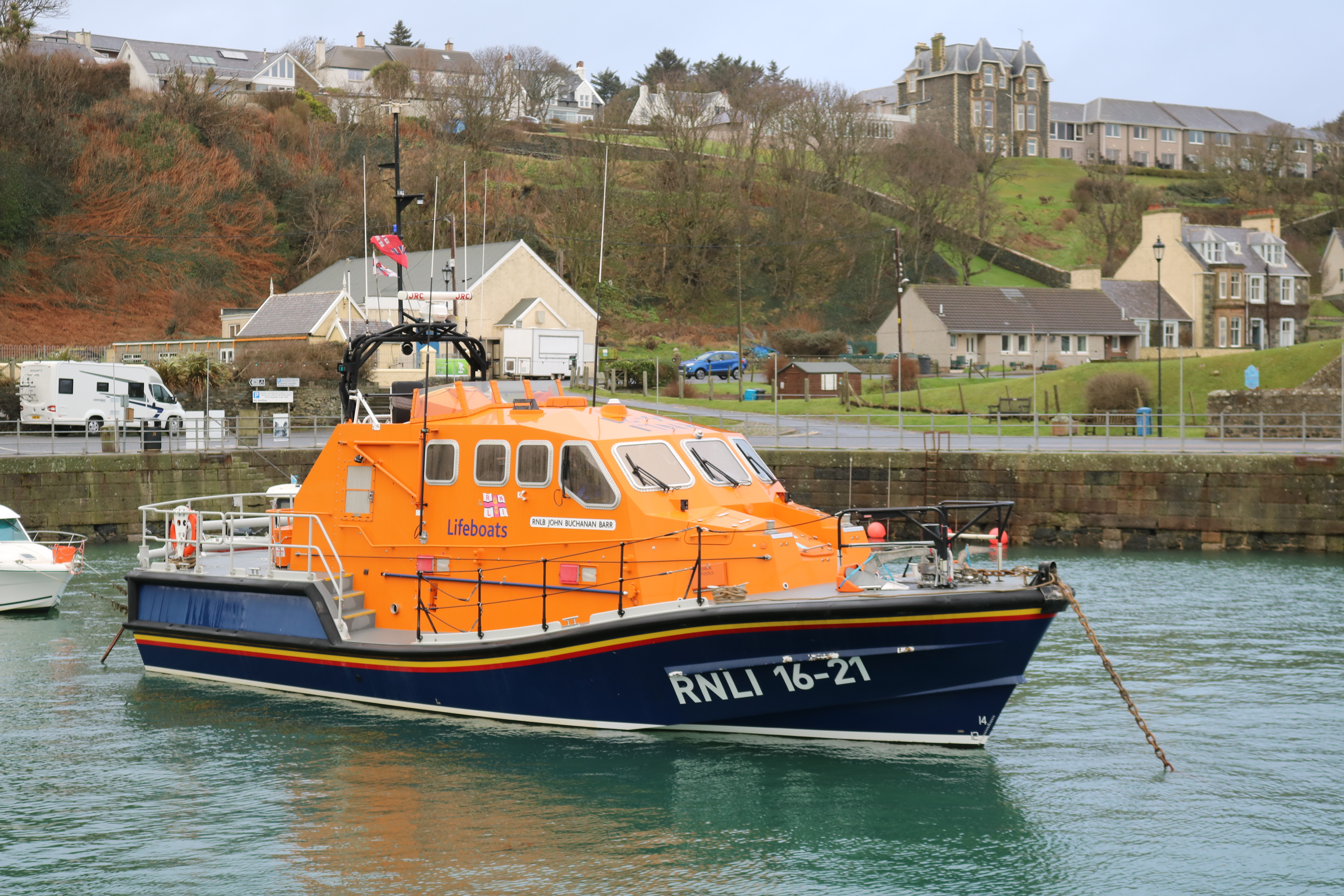
Tamar-class All-weather lifeboat 16-21 John Buchanan Barr (ON 1301)

The station currently operates a Tamar-class All-weather lifeboat, 16-21 John Buchanan Barr (ON 1301), on station since 2026.

== History ==
It is recorded that in 1805, renowned lifeboat builder Henry Greathead was constructing a lifeboat for Fraserburgh Harbour Commissioners (FHC), funded by donor Sir William Forbes. No details have been found, but it is likely that it was a 30 ft (9.1 m) non-self-righting boat. A second boat was provided to Fraserburgh in 1831, manufacturer and specification unknown, and was recorded as unfit for purpose by 1851.

In November 1857, Mr. Lewis Chalmers, Chief Magistrate, wrote to the RNLI, to highlight 13 shipwrecks in the area, over a period of 10 years. Following a visit to the town, Capt. Ward, Inspector of Lifeboats, recommended the establishment of a lifeboat station, which was agreed in March 1858. A lifeboat was ordered from Forrestt of Limehouse, London, a 30 ft (9.1 m) self-righting 'Pulling and Sailing' (P&S) lifeboat, one with sails and (10) oars, and costing £182-1s-2d, along with a launch carriage from Robinsons. A boathouse was constructed by the Harbour Commissioners. The boat was delayed, as it was damaged in a fire at the Forrestt workshop, only arriving in Fraserburgh on 26 October 1858. The boat was named Havelock. Lewis Chalmers was appointed Honorary Secretary.

A motor-powered lifeboat was placed at Fraserburgh in 1915. Costing £3,715, construction was started at Thames Ironworks, but completed by S.E. Saunders of Cowes, when the Thames Ironworks company failed. The 42 ft (13 m) lifeboat had a 40-bhp "Tylor" petrol-engine, and delivered a speed of 7.45 knots (13.80 km/h; 8.57 mph). The lifeboat was funded by Thomas Dyer-Edwardes, as a "Thankyou" for the life of his daughter, Noël Leslie, Countess of Rothes, who had survived the sinking of the RMS Titanic, and was duly named Lady Rothes (ON 641).

On 9 February 1953, the first of two disasters struck the Fraserburgh lifeboat. The John and Charles Kennedy (ON 790), a non-self-righting 46-foot Watson-class lifeboat, was launched to assist a number of fishing boats that were struggling to re-enter Fraserburgh harbour, due to the poor sea conditions. Having already escorted two vessels to the harbour, it would be the lifeboat that failed to make the return trip a third time, capsizing as it tried to enter the harbour. Five crew were trapped and drowned in the wreck. The Coxswain, who was thrown clear of the capsize, was hit by a piece of wreckage and killed. The John and Charles Kennedy had been launched 99 times, and saved 199 lives. In just 12 days, enough volunteers had come forward to form a new crew, including Second Coxswain Charles Tait Jr., the sole survivor of the wreck, and son of Bowman, Charles Tait Sr., who was lost in the disaster.

After a short period with the relief lifeboat John Russell (ON 699), the replacement lifeboat, Duchess of Kent (ON 908), was placed at Fraserburgh. She would serve 16 years at Fraserburgh, launching 46 times, and saving 11 lives.

In 1970, Fraserburgh would suffer a second disaster. The Duchess of Kent was launched on 06:30 on 21 January 1970, into a force 8/9 gale, to the aid of the Danish fishing boat Opal, which was taking on water some 40 miles (64 km) off Fraserburgh. She arrived on scene at 11:00, to find the Opal in tow from a Russian trawler, and a number of other vessels, including the large Russian ship Victor Kingisepp standing by. Suddenly, a large wave lifted up the bow, and the lifeboat was capsized bow over stern. Great efforts were made to right the vessel by the crew of the Victor Kingisepp, which was achieved by 14:31, but too late to save the crew, with the exception of mechanic John Jackson Buchan, who had been thrown into the water, and was rescued from the upturned hull. It would be eight years later, in 1978, before another lifeboat would be placed at Fraserburgh.

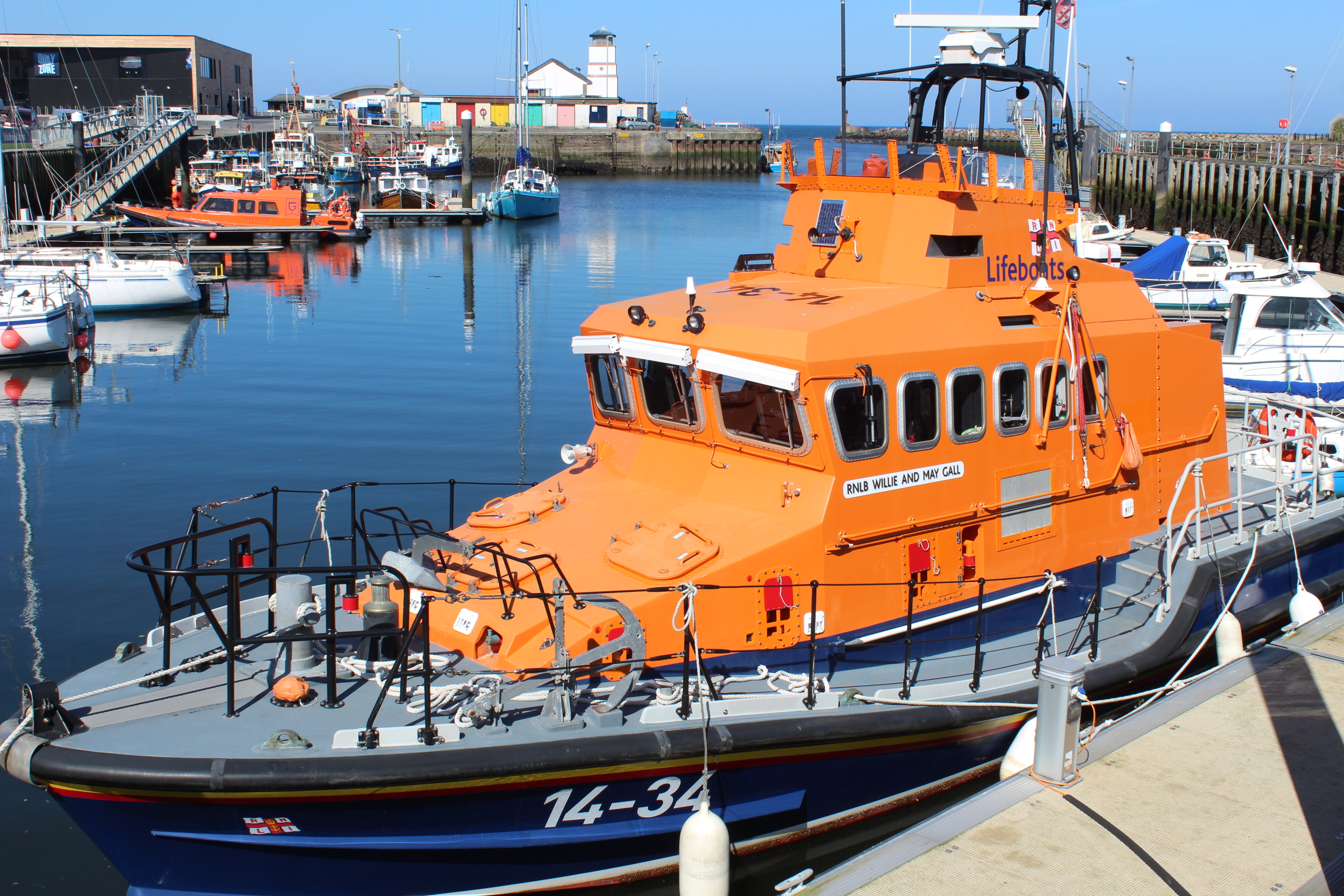
Trent-class lifeboat 14-34 Willie and May Gall (ON 1259)

In 2001, the RNLI announced that Fraserburgh would receive a new Trent-class lifeboat. Moulded in Fibre Reinforced Composite, and fitted out by Souters of Cowes, she had twin MAN Diesel engines, developing 808-bhp, giving a top speed of 25 knots (46 km/h; 29 mph). Costing £1,240,452, she arrived at Fraserburgh on 8 May 2002. The majority of the cost of the lifeboat was met by the legacy of £1 million from Mrs May C. Gall, of Newburgh. In 1942, her late husband William had been instrumental in the rescue of crew from the capsized Newburgh lifeboat. At a ceremony on 7 September 2002, the lifeboat was named 14-34 Willie and May Gall (ON 1259).

It was announced by the RNLI on 9 February 2026, that Fraserburgh would receive a Tamar-class lifeboat to replace their long-serving Trent class. Following a full refit, 16-61 John Buchanen Barr, previously on service at Portpatrick, arrived on station at 16:21 on 19 April 2026.

With a period of training on the Tamar-class lifeboat completed, and after serving Fraserburgh for 24 years, 14-34 Willie and May Gall (ON 1259) was stood down from service at 14:34 on Saturday 30 May 2026.

== Station honours ==
The following are awards made at Fraserburgh

- RNIPLS Gold Medal
  Lt. Charles Holcombe Bowen, RN, H.M Coastguard – 1827
  Lt. Charles Turner, RN – 1831
- RNIPLS Silver Medal
  Capt. James Scott, Master of the Sarah – 1835
- RNLI Silver Medal
  Godfrey Bosville McDonald Beatson, Chief Officer of H.M. Coastguard – 1858
  Godfrey Bosville McDonald Beatson, Chief Officer of H.M. Coastguard – 1863 (Second-Service clasp)
  Alexander Forbes, Shipbuilder - 1863
  Mrs Whyte, Farm Labourer's wife – 1884
  Andrew Noble, Coxswain – 1909
  Andrew Noble, Coxswain – 1909 (Second-Service clasp)
  James Stuart Sim, Second Coxswain (For a service in 1912) – 1929
  Capt. Andrew Stephen, Harbour Master, Joint Honorary Secretary – 1940
- RNLI Bronze Medal
  James Stuart Sim, Coxswain – 1936
  David Hay, Coxswain – 1940
  Capt Andrew Stephen, Harbour Master, Joint Honorary Secretary – 1940
  George Flett Duthie, Mechanic – 1940
  John Downie May, crew member – 1940
  Alexander John Duthie, Acting Coxswain – 1960
  Frederick Alexander Kirkness, Mechanic – 1960
  Albert Sutherland, Coxswain – 1997
- Medal Service Certificate
  J. Stephen, Acting Second Coxswain – 1960
  J. Strachan, Bowman – 1960
  C. Baillie, Assistant Mechanic – 1960
  G. Duthie, crew member – 1960
  B. Strachan, crew member – 1960
  J. Reid, crew member – 1960
  Victor Sutherland, Second Coxswain – 1997
  Thomas Summers, Motor Mechanic – 1997
  Alan Smith, Deputy Second Coxswain – 1997
  Graeme Campbell, Assistant Mechanic – 1997
  Rafael Alcarez, crew member – 1997
  David Sutherland, crew member – 1997
- 'The Thanks of the Institution inscribed on Vellum'
  Capt. Alexander Thomson, Master of the Lively – 1909
  Alexander Ritchie, crew member – 1929 (For a service in 1912)
  Andrew Ritchie, crew member – 1929 (For a service in 1912)
  James Mitchell, crew member – 1929 (For a service in 1912)
  Robert Strachan, Assistant Mechanic – 1940
  John Buchan, crew member – 1940
  Andrew Ritchie, crew member – 1940
  James May, crew member – 1940
  William Noble, crew member – 1940
  Albert Sutherland, Coxswain – 1989
- 'A Framed Letter of Thanks signed by the Chairman of the Institution'
  Albert Sutherland, Coxswain – 1995

== Roll of honour ==
In memory of those lost whilst serving at Fraserburgh:

- On service to H.M. vessel Eminent, 28 April 1919,
  Andrew Noble, Coxswain
  Andrew Farquhar, Acting Second Coxswain
- On service to multiple fishing boats, 9 February 1953
  Andrew Ritchie, Coxswain
  George Duthie, Mechanic
  Charles Tait Snr, Bowman
  James Noble, Assistant Mechanic
  John Crawford, crew member
  John Buchan, crew member
- On service to Danish fishing boat Opal, 21 January 1970
  John Stephen, Coxswain
  Frederick Kirkness, Mechanic
  William Hadden, crew member
  James R. S. Buchan, crew member
  James Buchan. crew member

== Fraserburgh lifeboats ==
=== Fraserburgh Harbour Commissioners lifeboats ===
Name	On station	Class	Comments
Unknown	1806−1831	Greathead	(Note: 30 ft 0 in (9.14 m) non-self-righting lifeboat, funded by Sir William Forbes, built by Henry Greathead of South Shields.)
Unknown	1831−1851	North Country	(Note: Lifeboat of unknown manufacturer or dimensions, funded by Harbour Dues.)

=== Pulling and Sailing (P&S) lifeboats ===
ON (Note: ON is the RNLI's Official Number of the boat.)	Name	Built	On station	Class	Comments
Pre-326	Havelock	1858	1858−1868	30-foot Peake self-righting (P&S)	(Note: 30-foot x 7-foot 6in (10-oared) Peake-class self-righting (P&S) lifeboat, gift of Mr Wm. McKerrell of Bath, built by Forrestt of Limehouse, London, costing £183.); Capsized on exercise, 8 December 1863. Sold in 1868.
Pre-351	Havelock	1859	1868−1874	32-foot Peake self-righting (P&S)	(Note: 32 ft 0 in (9.75 m) x 7 ft 9 in (2.36 m) (10-oared) Peake-class self-righting (P&S) lifeboat, gift of Mr Wm. McKerrell of Bath, built by Forrestt of Limehouse, London, costing £174 when new.); Previously Percy at Cullercoats, Refit 1868. Condemned and broken up in 1874.
Pre-487	Charlotte	1867	1874−1880	33-foot Peake self-righting (P&S)	(Note: 33 ft 0 in (10.06 m) x 8 ft 6 in (2.59 m) (10-oared) Peake-class self-righting (P&S) lifeboat, gift of Mr Wm. McKerrell of Bath, built by Forrestt of Limehouse, London, costing £290 when new.); Previously at Seaton Carew. Damaged on service in 1876. Returned to London in 1880, and broken up in 1881.
Pre-651	Cosmo & Charles	1880	1880−1887	34-foot self-righting (P&S)	(Note: 34 ft 0 in (10.36 m) x 8 ft 3 in (2.51 m) (10-oared) self-righting (P&S) lifeboat, gift of Capt. A. H. Gordon of Fyvie, Aberdeenshire, built by Woolfe of Shadwell, London, costing £363.); Capsized on service in 1884. Transferred to the Relief fleet, and sold in 1893.
108	Cosmo & Charles	1887	1887−1894	37-foot self-righting (P&S)	(Note: 37 ft 0 in (11.28 m) x 8 ft 0 in (2.44 m) (12-oared) self-righting (P&S) lifeboat, gift of Capt. A. H. Gordon of Fyvie, Aberdeenshire, built by Forrestt of Limehouse, London, costing £454.); Sold in 1894.
366	Anna Maria Lee	1894	1894−1897	38-foot self-righting (P&S)	(Note: 38 ft 0 in (11.58 m) x 8 ft 0 in (2.44 m) (12-oared) self-righting (P&S) lifeboat, legacy of Mrs S. A. Lee of Gunnersbury, built by McAlister & Sons, of Dumbarton, costing £476.); Broken up in 1897.
402	Anna Maria Lee	1897	1897−1915	37-foot self-righting (P&S)	(Note: 37 ft 0 in (11.28 m) x 9 ft 3 in (2.82 m) (12-oared) self-righting (P&S) lifeboat, legacy of Mrs S. A. Lee of Gunnersbury, built by Rutherford of Birkenhead, costing £567.); Transferred to Ramsey.

Pre ON numbers are unofficial numbers used by the Lifeboat Enthusiasts' Society to reference early lifeboats not included on the official RNLI list.

=== Motor lifeboats ===
ON	Op.No. (Note: Op.No. is the RNLI's Operational Number of the boat carried on the hull.)	Name	Built	On station	Class	Comments
641	−	Lady Rothes	1914	1915−1937	42-foot self-righting (motor)	(Note: 42 ft 0 in (12.80 m) x 11 ft 6 in (3.51 m) self-righting motor lifeboat, gift of Mr T. Dyer Edwardes, JP, built by Thames Ironworks, completed by S. E. Saunders, costing £3,715.); Sold in 1937. Renamed Liberty Belle, Albatross and Wandering Albatross. Reverted to Lady Rothes but destroyed at Sandhaven in 2008.
790	−	John and Charles Kennedy	1937	1937−1953	46-foot Watson	Wrecked on service, 9 February 1953, with the loss of six crew.
699	−	John Russell	1926	1953−1954	45-foot 6in Watson	Previously at Montrose.
908	−	Duchess of Kent	1954	1954−1970	46-foot 9in Watson	Capsized on service, 21 January 1970, with the loss of five crew.
Station Closed 1970–1978
1013	48-010	The Royal British Legion Jubilee	1971	1978−1979	Solent	Lifeboat from the Relief fleet.
1011	48-008	R Hope Roberts	1969	1979−1985	Solent	Previously at Rosslare Harbour. Transferred to Galway Bay.
1021	48-016	Douglas Currie	1973	1985	Solent	Originally deployed in the Relief fleet. Previously at Kirkwall and Macduff. Transferred to Portpatrick.
1109	47-007	City of Edinburgh	1985	1985−2002	Tyne	
1259	14-34	Willie and May Gall	2002	2002−2026	Trent	
1301	16-21	John Buchanan Barr	2011	2026–	Tamar	

== See also ==
- List of RNLI stations
- List of former RNLI stations
- Royal National Lifeboat Institution lifeboats
