= Kirkwall Lifeboat Station =

RNLI Lifeboat station in Orkney, Scotland

- Kirkwall Lifeboat Station

- Location within Orkney Islands

General information
- Type: RNLI Lifeboat Station
- Location: The Lifeboat House, West Pier, Kirkwall, Orkney, KW15 1LE, Scotland
- Coordinates: 58°59′07.3″N 2°57′37.2″W
- Opened: 1972
- Owner: Royal National Lifeboat Institution

Website
- Kirkwall RNLI Lifeboat Station

Kirkwall Lifeboat Station is located in the harbour town of Kirkwall, the largest town of Mainland, Orkney, in the isles of Orkney, Scotland.

A lifeboat was first operated out of Kirkwall in 1968, by the Royal National Lifeboat Institution (RNLI). A station was established there in 1972.

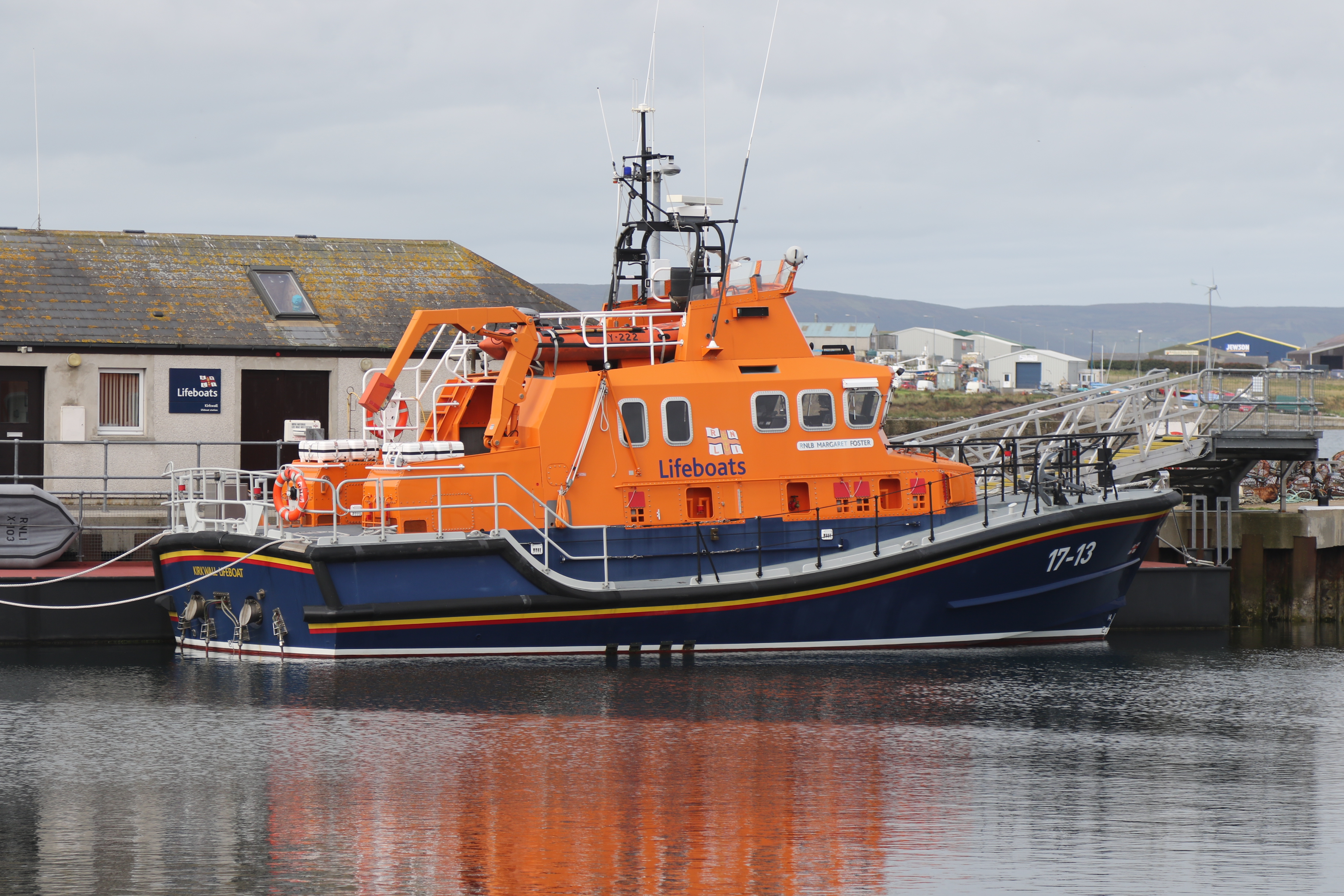
Kirkwall Severn-class All-weather lifeboat 17-13 Margaret Foster (ON 1231)

The station currently operates a Severn-class All-weather lifeboat, 17-13 Margaret Foster (ON 1231), on station since 1998.

== History ==
In the 1960s, the RNLI ordered two 70-foot-long (21 m) Clyde-class lifeboats, to evaluate the benefits of operating larger offshore vessels, which could remain at sea for many days without refuelling, and were able to cover some of the more exposed waters. The first, 70-001 Charles H Barrett (Civil Service No.35) (ON 987), had a two-year trial period, and was then placed at Clovelly in 1968. The second, 70-002, Grace Paterson Ritchie (ON 988), was first based out of Ullapool in 1966. In 1968, the boat was relocated to cover the Orkney Isles during the week, and berthed at Kirkwall Harbour at weekends.

In worsening condition on 8 November 1971, the Danish fishing vessel Clupea broke her moorings and ran aground near Kirkwall Pier. Three other Danish vessels were also torn from their moorings. The Grace Paterson Ritchie managed to tow the Rosslau and Anne Stranne clear of Kirkwall pier, then set anchor, to veer down and tow the Clupea, and then the Kami. With the highest praise for his seamanship and skill from all concerned, Staff Coxswain Robert Hunter Dennison was awarded the RNLI Bronze Medal, with the crew receiving Medal Service certificates. As well as saving the lives of 20 men, it was estimated that this service had also saved vessels worth over £100,000, and a suitable donation was made to the Institution from the insurance companies.

A lifeboat station was eventually opened at Kirkwall on 30 May 1972. In 1974, Grace Paterson Ritchie was sent for maintenance, and for one year, the station operated a Solent-class lifeboat, 48-016 Douglas Currie (ON 1021). Grace Paterson Ritchie would return in 1975, and served through until 1988, when the RNLI finally decided that this type of boat didn't fit with usual RNLI operations, and the two Clyde-class lifeboats, and a later boat, 70-003 City of Bristol (ON 1030), were withdrawn and sold out of service.

In a violent storm of 22 January 1984, the fishing vessel Benachie broke her moorings, and was washed ashore on Rousay island. Grace Paterson Ritchie arrived on scene, dropped anchor, and veering down, managed to get a line aboard. The vessel and three crew were towed to safety. Coxswain Capt. William Swanson Sinclair received the RNLI Bronze Medal for this service.

Kirkwall would receive 52-39 Mickie Salvesen (ON 1135) in 1988, a new 52-foot Arun-class lifeboat. Just six weeks later, the Arun lifeboat headed out at 07:18 on the 13 September 1988, into 20-foot seas and a force 6 storm, to the aid of the 500-ton bulk cement carrier BC Mercurius, which had suffered engine failure approximately one mile north of Noup Head, Westray. Four crewmen were recovered by helicopter, leaving just two crew aboard. Setting up a tow line several times, the lifeboat managed to pull the vessel away from the shore, until the vessel could set anchor, and await a tug. The lifeboat arrived home at 08:55 the following day. For what turned out to be his last service, Coxswain Capt. William Swanson Sinclair would receive a second-service clasp to his previously won bronze medal.

In 1989, dredging works were undertaken to accommodate the Arun-class lifeboat at the harbour berth, and new station buildings were constructed in 1990, to include a workshop and improved crew facilities.

Funded by Miss M. E. Foster, a new Severn-class lifeboat 17-13 Margaret Foster (ON 1231) was placed on service at Kirkwall in 1998. In one of the first services of the new lifeboat, and in force 9 conditions, local GP Dr. Peter Fay was taken on board, to a suspected heart-attack victim on the rig-support vessel Stream Truck, 17 miles (27 km) north of the station. Despite suffering seasickness for the whole journey, Fay immediately set about his duties on arrival at the vessel. For this service, Dr. Peter Fay was accorded 'The Thanks of the Institution inscribed on Vellum - Doctor's award'.

The relief Severn-class lifeboat 17-33 Beth Sell (ON 1262), on station in September 2020, was called to the creel boat Kingfisher (DH 110), which had fouled her propellers, 26 miles (42 km) south east of Orkney. Arriving at the vessel at 16:35, in near gale-force conditions, the boat was taken in tow, arriving back at Kirkwall seven hours later.

== Station honours ==
The following are awards made at Kirkwall.

- RNLI Bronze Medal
  Robert Hunter Dennison, Staff Coxswain – 1972
  Capt. William Swanson Sinclair, Coxswain – 1984
  Capt. William Swanson Sinclair, Coxswain – 1989 (Second-Service clasp)
- Medal Service Certificate
  Each of the crew of Grace Paterson Ritchie – 1972
  James Mitchell, Second Coxswain – 1989
  Dupre Strutt, Motor Mechanic – 1989
  Robert Mainland, Assistant Mechanic – 1989
  Geoffrey Gardens, crew member – 1989
  Robert Hall, crew member – 1989
  Smith Foubister, crew member – 1989
- 'The Thanks of the Institution inscribed on Vellum'
  Stewart Ryrie, Second Coxswain – 2010
  Dr. Peter Fay, GP – 1999 (Doctor's award)
- 'A Framed Letter of Thanks signed by the Chairman of the Institution'
  Capt. Sinclair, Honorary Secretary – 1973
  F. Johnston, Coxswain – 1973
  D. Grieve, crew member – 1973
  J. Grey, crew member – 1973
  D. Pearce, crew member – 1973
  M. Drever, crew member – 1973
  B. Hall, crew member – 1973
  Geoff Gardens, Coxswain – 2011
- 'A Letter of Thanks signed by the Director of the Institution'
  Robert Hall – 1999
  Kenneth Gee – 2008
  Russell Brown – 2008
- Member, Order of the British Empire (MBE)
  Dupre Alexander Strutt, Motor Mechanic and former Area Lifesaving Manager – 2023NYH
  Kenneth Gee, crew member and former 3rd Mechanic – 2025NYH
  Patricia Margaret Smith, fundraising committee – 2026NYH

== Kirkwall lifeboats ==
ON (Note: ON is the RNLI's Official Number of the boat.)	Op.No. (Note: Op.No. is the RNLI's Operational Number of the boat carried on the hull.)	Name	Built	On station	Class	Comments
988	70-002	Grace Paterson Ritchie	1965	1968−1974	Clyde	Previously on Trials, and at Ullapool.
1021	48-016	Douglas Currie	1973	1974−1975	Solent	Transferred to Macduff.
988	70-002	Grace Paterson Ritchie	1965	1975−1988	Clyde	Sold to National Lifesaving Association of Iceland in 1989, and renamed Henry A. Hálfdánsson.
1135	52-39	Mickie Salvesen	1988	1988−1998	Arun	Transferred to the Relief fleet, later at Aberdeen and Barry Dock.
1231	17-13	Margaret Foster	1998	1998−	Severn	

More post-service details can be found on the respective lifeboat class pages.

== See also ==
- List of RNLI stations
- List of former RNLI stations
- Royal National Lifeboat Institution lifeboats
