= Whitehills =

Coordinates: 57.676°N 2.580°W

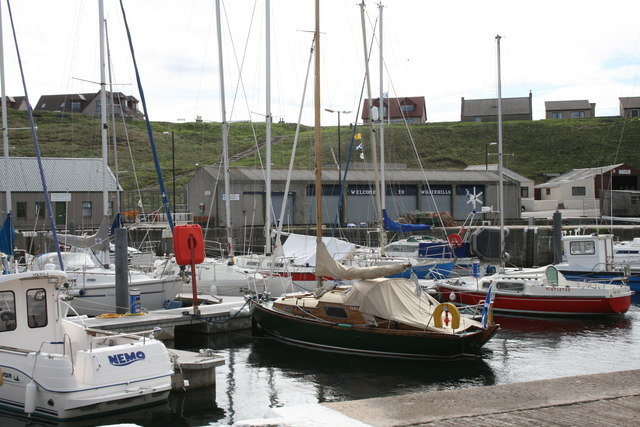
- Today, Whitehills harbour hosts more leisure craft than fishing vessels

- Location within Aberdeenshire
- Population: 990 (2020)
- OS grid reference: NJ655653
- Council area: Aberdeenshire
- Lieutenancy area: Banffshire
- Country: Scotland
- Sovereign state: United Kingdom
- Post town: BANFF
- Postcode district: AB45
- Dialling code: 01261
- Police: Scotland
- Fire: Scottish
- Ambulance: Scottish

Whitehills is a small fishing village in Aberdeenshire, Scotland, that lies three miles (five kilometres) west of Banff on the Moray Firth. It is part of the historic county of Banffshire. In 2022 it had a population of 990.

It surrounds a rocky bay to the west of Knock Head. It has grown as a fishing village since the 16th century and developed especially in the 19th century. It is characterised by its old village, which stretches along the shore towards the harbour. This has developed like other Moray Firth fishing villages, with small houses clustered around each other with gable ends facing the sea. The exteriors are painted a variety of colours; gable ends face the sea and there is extensive use of rybats and edge detailing as well as distinctive white grouting between granite blocks. Most houses front directly onto the street with small informal spaces between them.

The village expanded inland in the 19th century through the development of terraced 1 1/2-storey and detached villa housing. The shore, links and extensive views from throughout the village add a sense of openness. The landmark buildings in Whitehills are the parish church (built in 1773) and the Downie's fish processing plant, as well as the marina.

The clock tower of Trinity Church of Scotland (1879) was built by Alexander Ross. The Methodist Chapel dates to 1840.

During the 20th century, the town has developed to the east and also along the southerly edges. Around half the building stock is low density, private new build; these are built in a style which is typical of most modern development. The modern extension to the village has little in common with old town character or its street pattern and its recent spread means that the village can clearly be seen from Banff. The village's exposed location, sea views and unique character, mean that new development is unavoidably obvious. Further expansion to the south west is likely to most favoured by developers, but this should maintain principles of good layout and sympathetic siting in order to avoid the sprawl of the village.

== Fishing ==
The Annual Reports of the Fishery Board for Scotland provide an insight into the fishing in Whitehills in the years before the First World War. In 1901 the report states that:"the best boats go to the herring fishing at Fraserburgh and Shetland, the second class ones fishing at home. Here also line fishing is on the decline." In the 1914 report, the port is described as being: "chiefly a line and cod net fishing creek. There is a slight decrease in quantity. The number of motor boats is about doubled."

Fishery Statistics

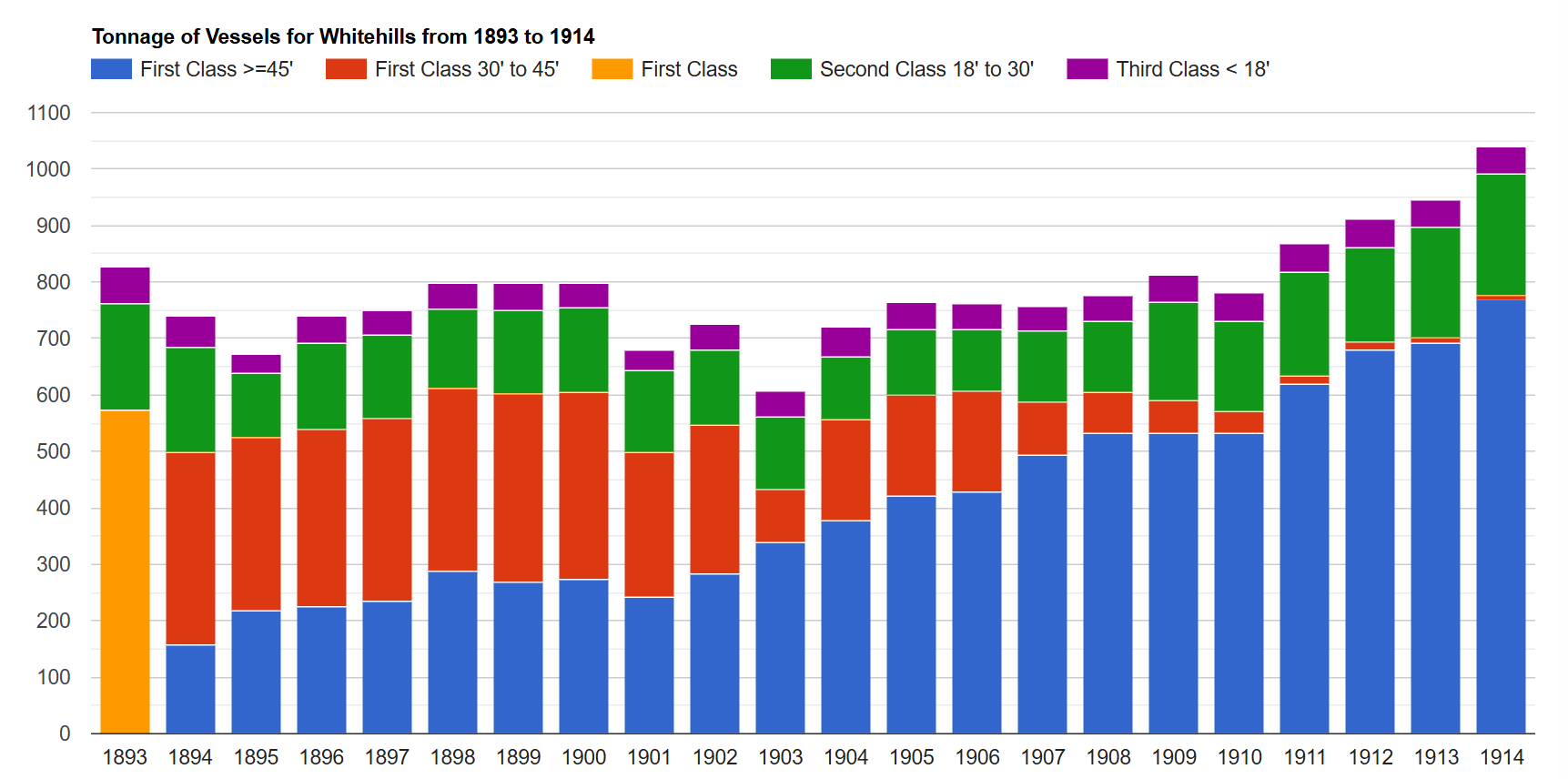
Tonnage of vessels

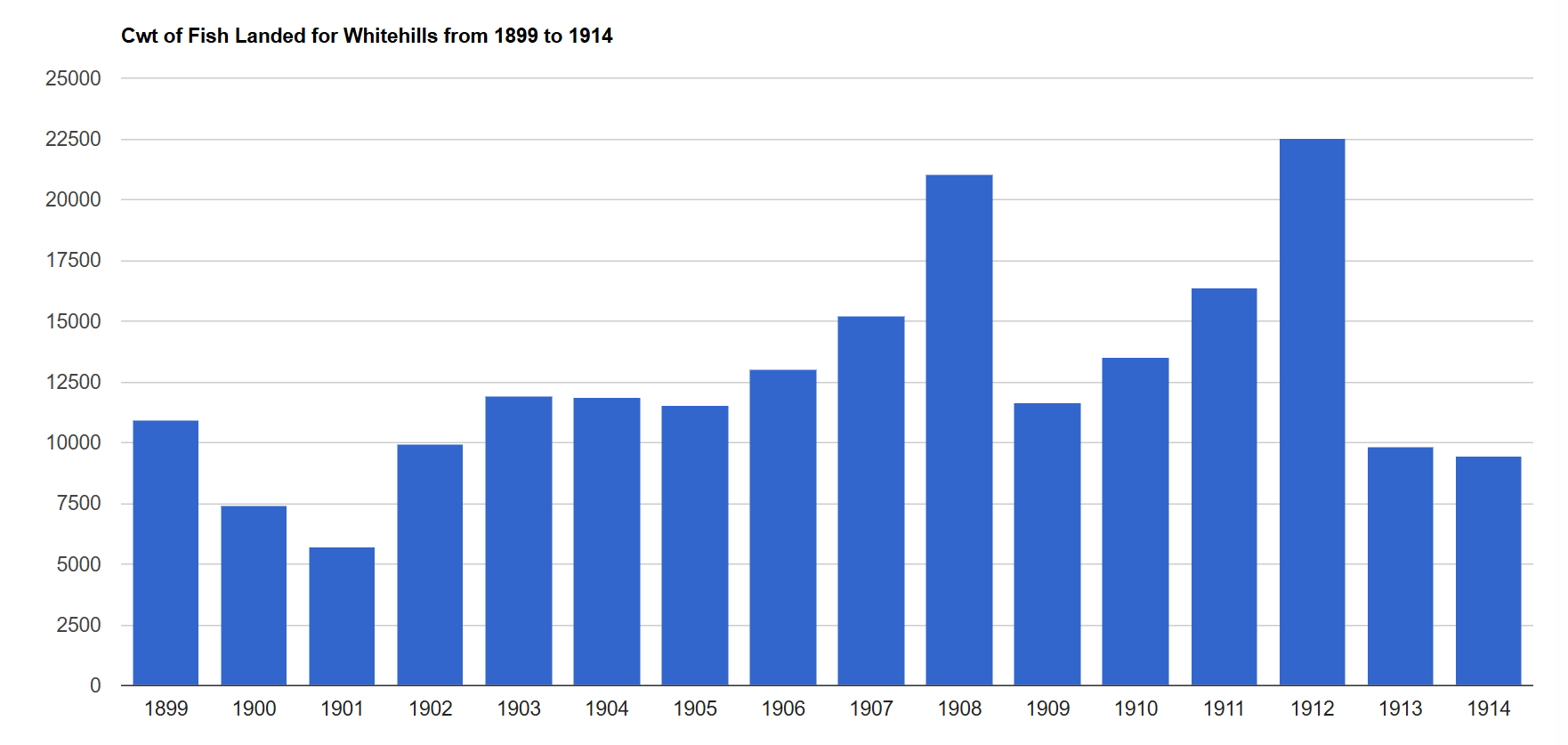
Cwt of fish landed

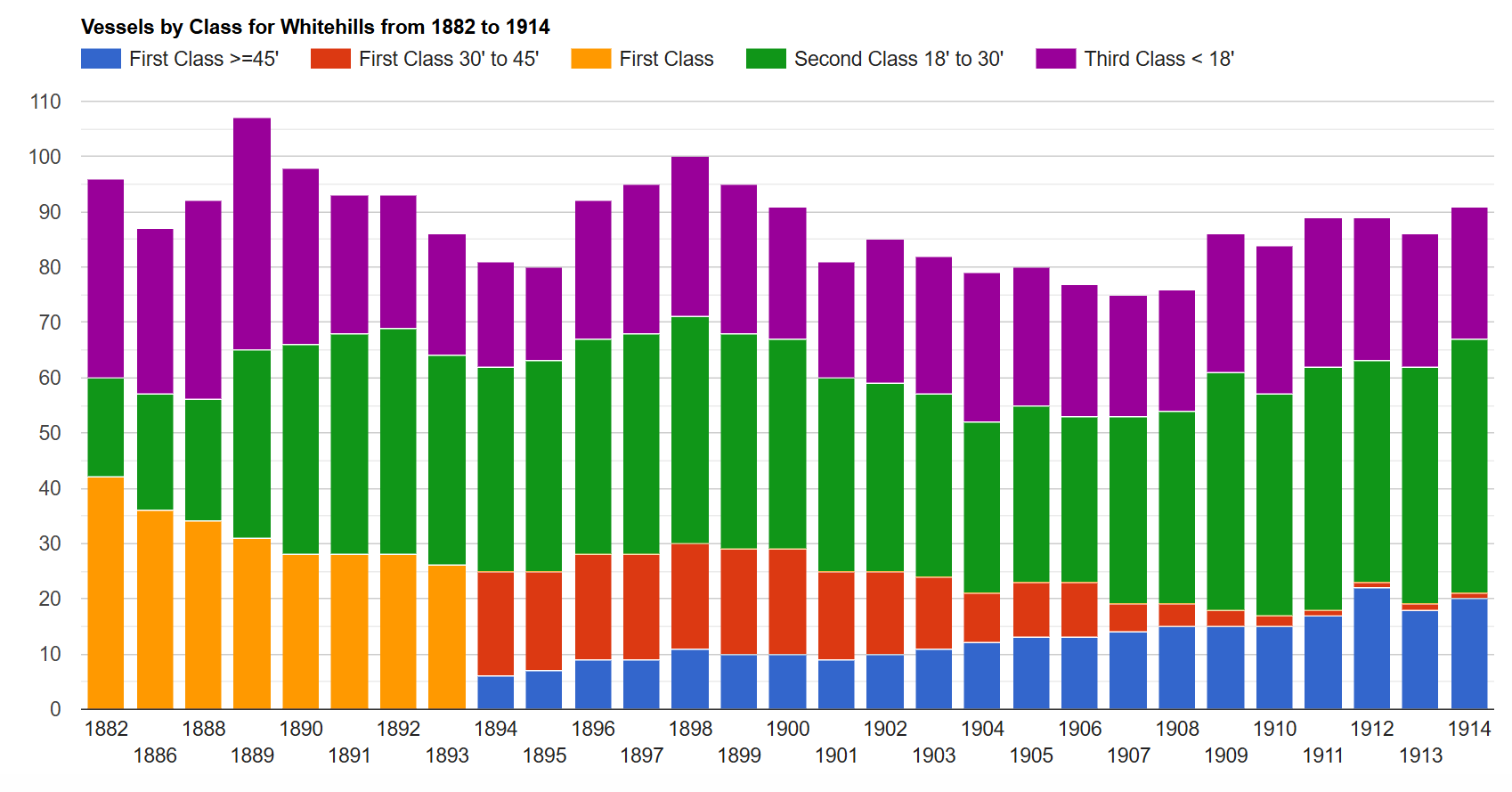
Vessels by class

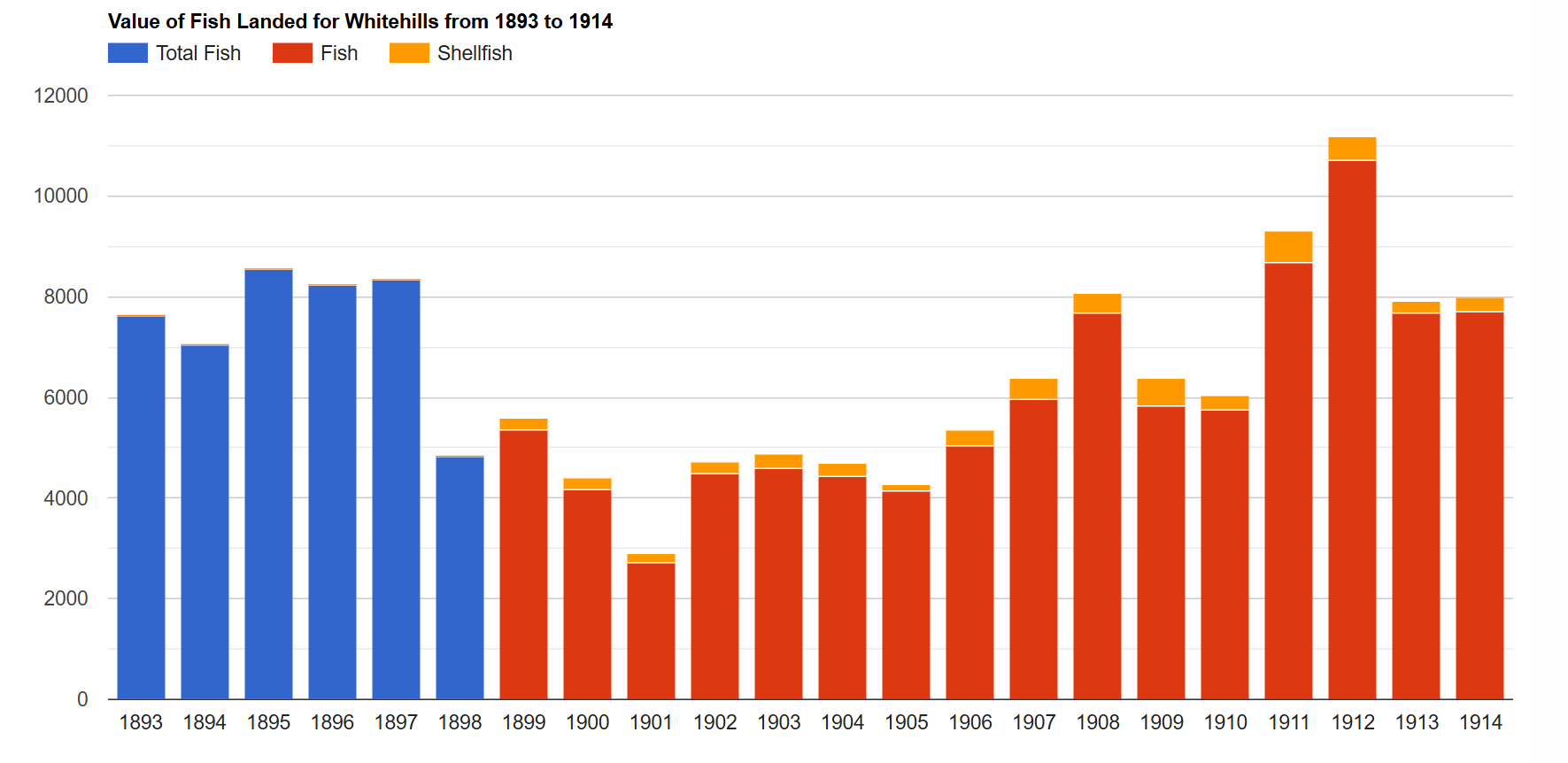
Value (£) of fish landed

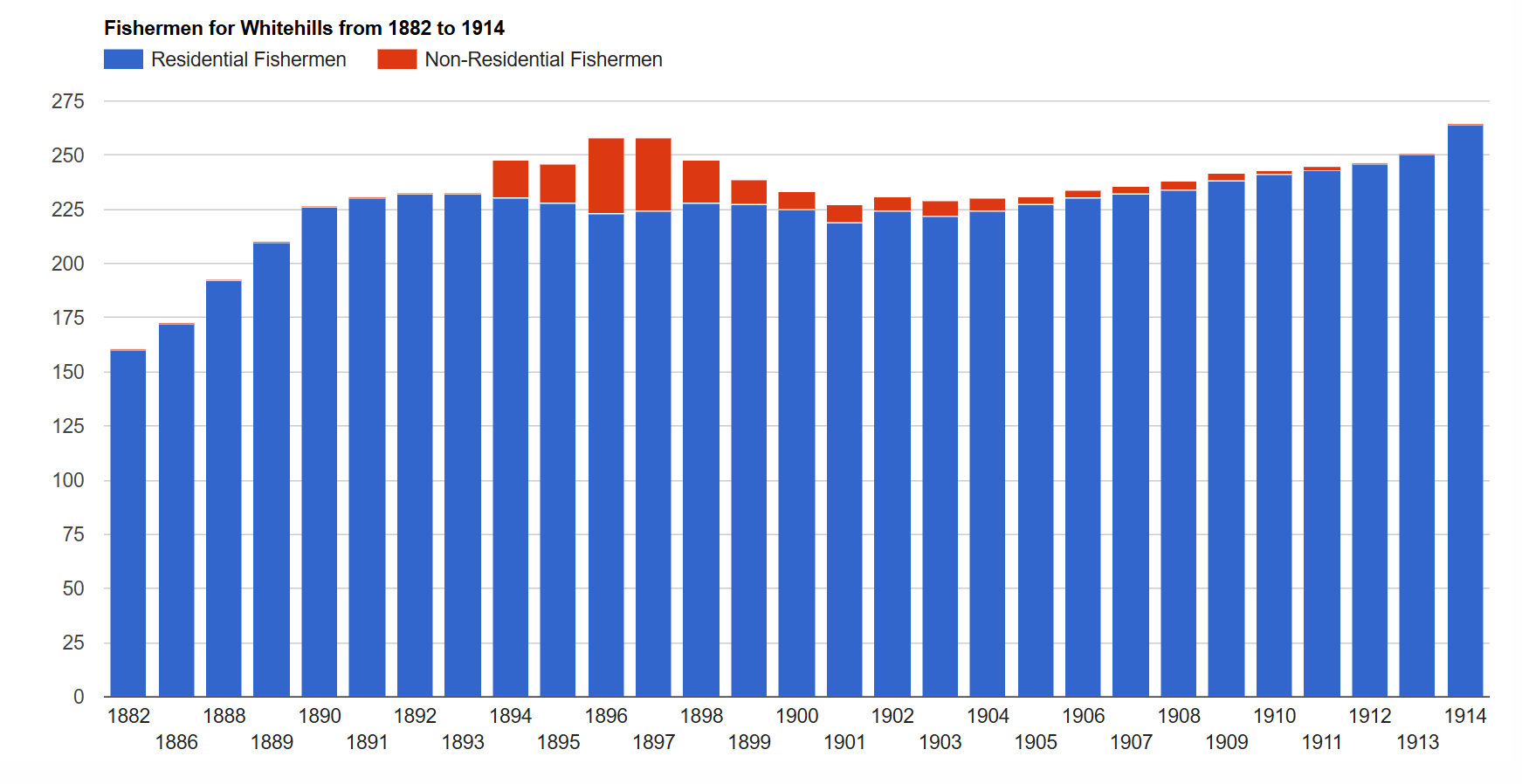
Fishermen

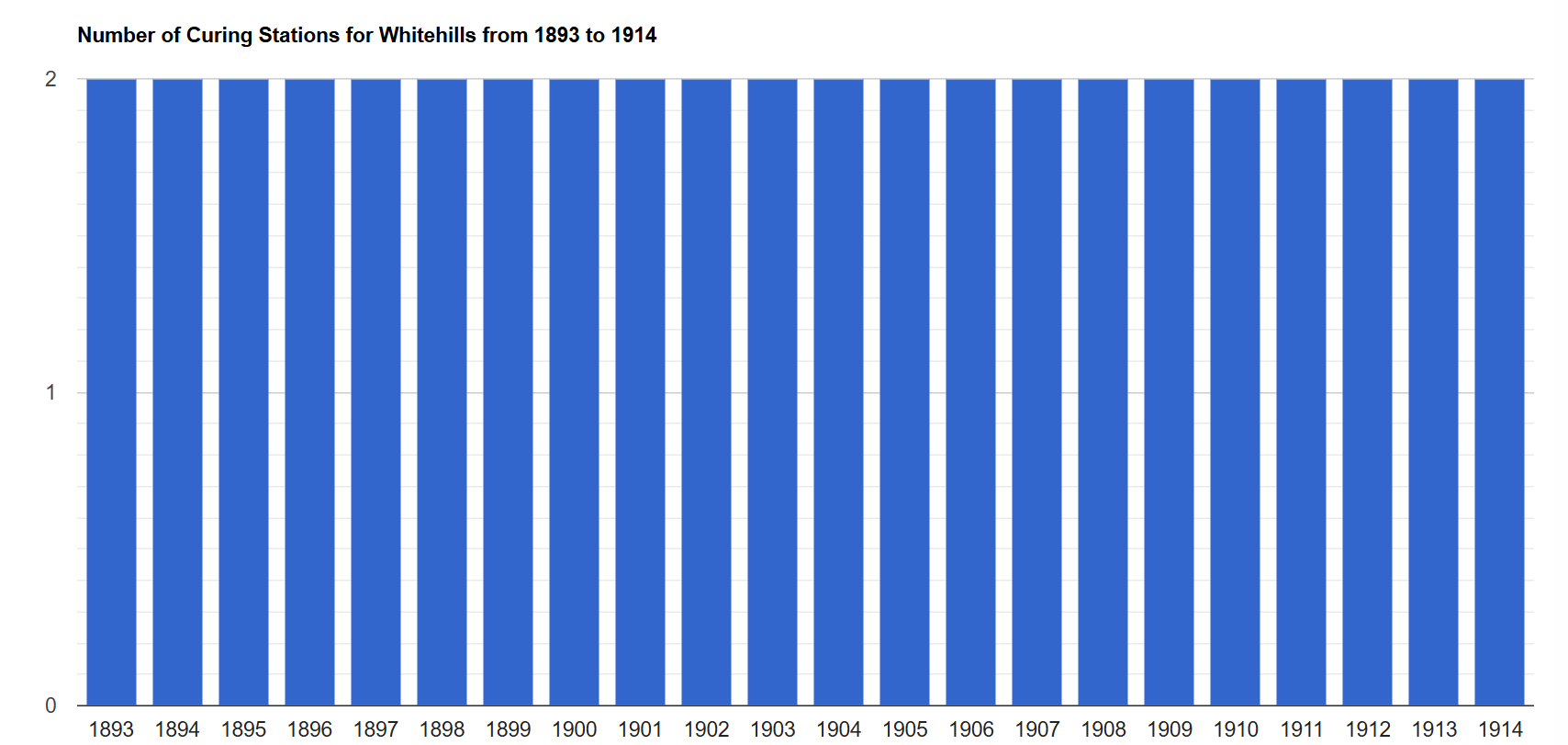
Number of curing stations

== Attractions ==
In 1999, the fishing harbour was developed as a leisure marina, called the Whitehills Marina. The marina offers facilities for visiting sailors and hosts an annual sailing regatta in August. The marina has 47 pontoon berths and is accessible at all states of the tide. Drying out for maintenance is possible in a purpose-built bay of the inner harbour.

A five-mile-long (eight-kilometre) coastal path stretches from the Whitehills Harbour to Banff Harbour.

On the outskirts of the village there is an ancient Roman structure called the Red Well whose name derives from the water spring it was built to protect which leaves a red deposit, possibly due to high iron content.

== Lifeboat ==
Between 1924 and 1969 Whitehills had an RNLI lifeboat station. The station was transferred from Banff and in 1932 a new boathouse and slipway (which still stand today) were constructed for a new motor lifeboat. Whitehills received a new 47-foot (14-metre) Watson-class boat in 1961, but this was withdrawn and the station closed in 1969 after launching only eleven times in eight years.
