= Hythe, Sandgate & Folkestone Lifeboat Station =

Former RNLI lifeboat station in Kent, England

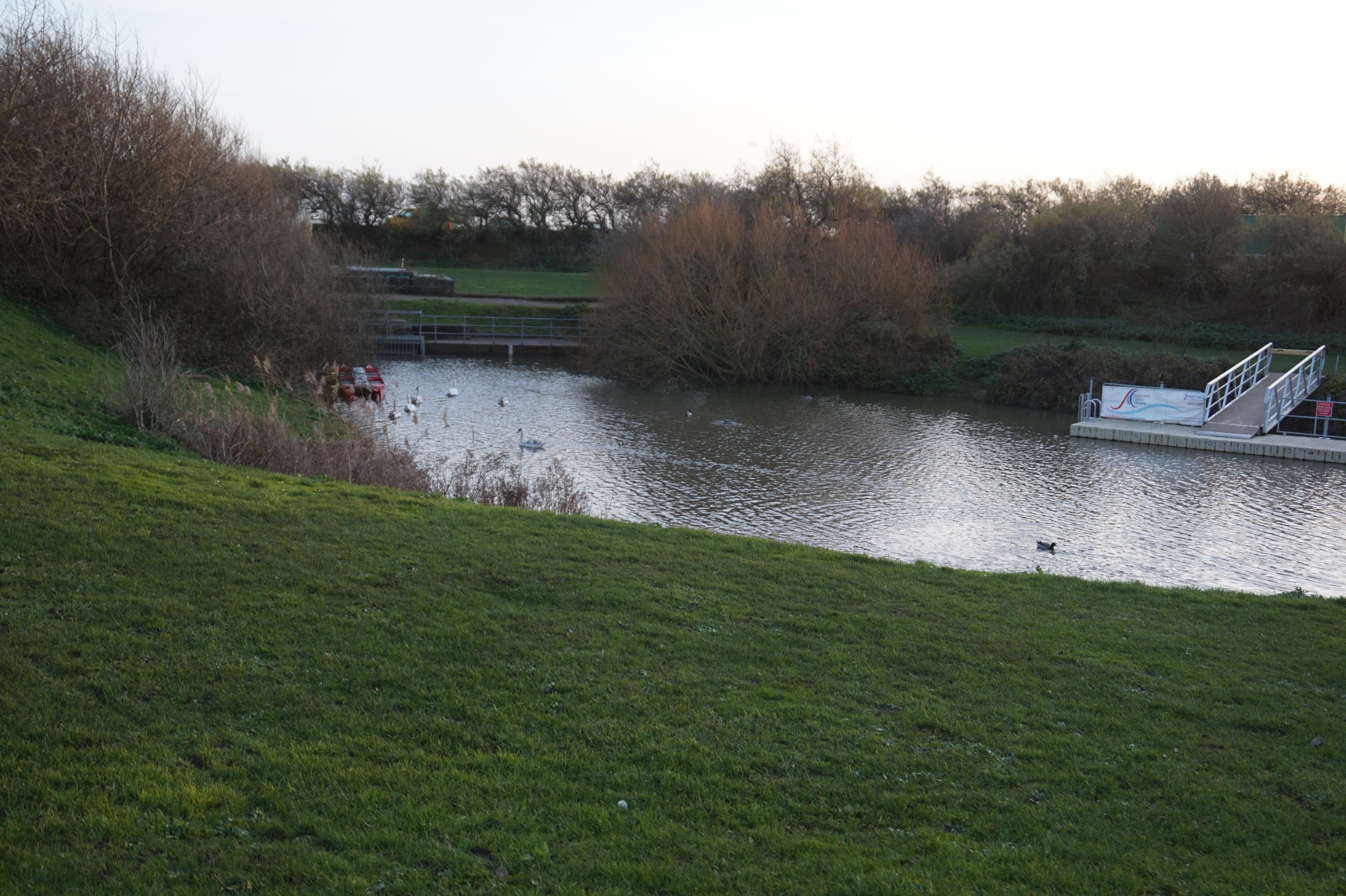
- End of the Royal Military Canal, Seabrook, Kent

- Seabrook, Kent

General information
- Status: Closed
- Type: RNLI Lifeboat Station
- Location: Princes Parade, Seabrook, Kent, England
- Coordinates: 51°04′17.4″N 1°07′20.6″E
- Opened: 1876
- Closed: 1893

Hythe, Sandgate & Folkestone Lifeboat Station was located off Princes Parade, Seabrook, at the eastern end of the Royal Military Canal, midway between Hythe and Folkestone, in the county of Kent.

A lifeboat station was first established at Seabrook in 1876, by the Royal National Lifeboat Institution (RNLI).

Hythe, Sandgate & Folkestone lifeboat station was closed in 1893, with the opening of two separate stations at Hythe and Folkestone.

== History ==
In 1875, the RNLI decided to open a lifeboat station near Folkestone, as at the time, it was one of the primary ports from which to cross the English Channel. "Wrecks are not very frequent in the immediate neighbourhood; but, on the other hand, Folkestone is one of the chief ports for passenger transport between England and the Continent, and it was thought desirable to station this Life- boat in the vicinity, in readiness to assist distressed or wrecked vessels in Dungeness Bay, in easterly or south-easterly gales, when the Dungeness and New Romney Life- boats could not do so." A site at Seabrook was rented from the War Office, and a fine boathouse was designed by the Institutions Honorary Architect, Mr C. H. Cooke. It was constructed by J. Bissenden at a cost of £541.

A 35-foot self-righting 'Pulling and Sailing' (P&S) lifeboat, one with sails and (10) oars, costing £397, was built by Woolfe of Shadwell, and arrived in Seabrook on 15 April 1876, along with a new carriage and all the equipment, transported free of charge by the South Eastern railway company. Funded from the gift of Miss Hannah de Rothschild in memory of her late father Baron Mayer Amschel de Rothschild (29 June 1818 – 6 February 1874), at a ceremony on 20th April, the boat was named Mayer de Rothschild (ON 58).

The lifeboat was first launched on service on 31 May 1878, to the aid of the vessel Großer Kurfürst, after being rammed by the König Wilhelm. The vessel sank off Folkestone before the lifeboat arrived, with the loss of 284 lives.

On two further occasions when the lifeboat was launched, to the brigantine Maria Louise on 8 January 1879, and the sloop Plessey on 29 January 1883, conditions were so poor that each time, the lifeboat failed to reach the vessel in distress. Fortunately, the coastguard would effect a rescue in both instances, with the loss of just one life.

As a result, it was decided a 'more powerful' lifeboat was required; in other words, one with more oars. The Mayer de Rothschild (ON 58) was transferred to Little and Broad Haven, where the boat was renamed Friend. A 37-foot 12-oared lifeboat, costing £340, was provided to Hythe, Sandgate and Folkestone in 1884. Once again appropriated to the gift of Hannah de Rothschild, the boat was again named Mayer de Rothschild (ON 35).

In one of the worst storms for years, at 04:15 on 11 November 1891, the schooner Eider was driven ashore at Sandgate. Lifeboat Coxswain Lawrence Hennessy waded out into the surf to the wreck, and managed to pass them a line. All four crewmen were rescued. For his bravery, Lawrence Hennessy was awarded the RNLI Silver Medal.

Later the same morning, at 08:00, the full-rigged ship Benvenue of Glasgow was also driven ashore. Attempts to launch the lifeboat into the rough conditions at Seabrook failed, and so the lifeboat was transported to Hythe. Only getting away at 09:30, the lifeboat then capsized. The boat was thrown onto the beach, and all the crew scrambled ashore, with the exception of Charles W. Fagg, who was lost. When the weather subsided later that evening, the lifeboat was launched again, and 27 people were rescued from the Benvenue. Amongst other awards, Lawrence Hennessy would receive his second RNLI Silver Medal of the day.

By 1893, difficulties were being encountered when launching the boat at Seabrook, due to coastal erosion. Following the problems launching to the Benvenue, it was decided to open a new station at Folkestone, and transfer the Mayer de Rothschild (ON 35) to another new station at Hythe. Hythe, Sandgate & Folkestone Lifeboat Station closed on 11 December 1893. The boathouse was later sold, and became a cafe, but was demolished in 1956.

== Station honours ==
The following are awards made at Hythe, Sandgate & Folkestone.

- Albert Medal, Second Class

Lawrence Hennessy, Boatman, H.M. Coastguard, Coxswain – 1891

- RNLI Silver Medal

Lawrence Hennessy, Boatman, H.M. Coastguard, Coxswain – 1891
Albert Sadler, Commissioned Boatman, H.M. Coastguard, Assistant Coxswain – 1891
Lawrence Hennessy, Boatman, H.M. Coastguard, Coxswain – 1891 (Second-Service Clasp)

- Lloyd's Medal for Saving Life at Sea

Lawrence Hennessy, Boatman, H.M. Coastguard, Coxswain – 1891

== Roll of honour ==
In memory of those lost whilst serving Hythe, Sandgate & Folkestone lifeboat.

- Lost when the lifeboat Mayer de Rothschild (ON 35) capsized, on service to the Benvenue of Glasgow, 11 November 1891

Charles William Fagg (27)

== Hythe, Sandgate & Folkestone lifeboats ==
=== Pulling and Sailing (P&S) lifeboats ===
ON (Note: ON is the RNLI's Official Number of the boat.)	Name	Built	On station	Class	Comments
58	Mayer de Rothschild	1876	1876–1884	35-foot Self-righting (P&S)	(Note: 35-foot x 9-foot (10-oared) self-righting (P&S) lifeboat, gift of Miss Hannah de Rothschild of London, built by Woolfe of Shadwell, London, costing £397.)
35	Mayer de Rothschild	1884	1884–1893	37-foot Self-righting (P&S)	(Note: 37-foot x 8-foot (12-oared) self-righting (P&S) lifeboat, gift of Miss Hannah de Rothschild of London, built by Woolfe of Shadwell, London, costing £340.); Capsized 11 November 1891.

== See also ==
- List of RNLI stations
- List of former RNLI stations
- Royal National Lifeboat Institution lifeboats
