= Folkestone Lifeboat Station =

Former lifeboat station in Kent, England

Former Folkestone RNLI Station
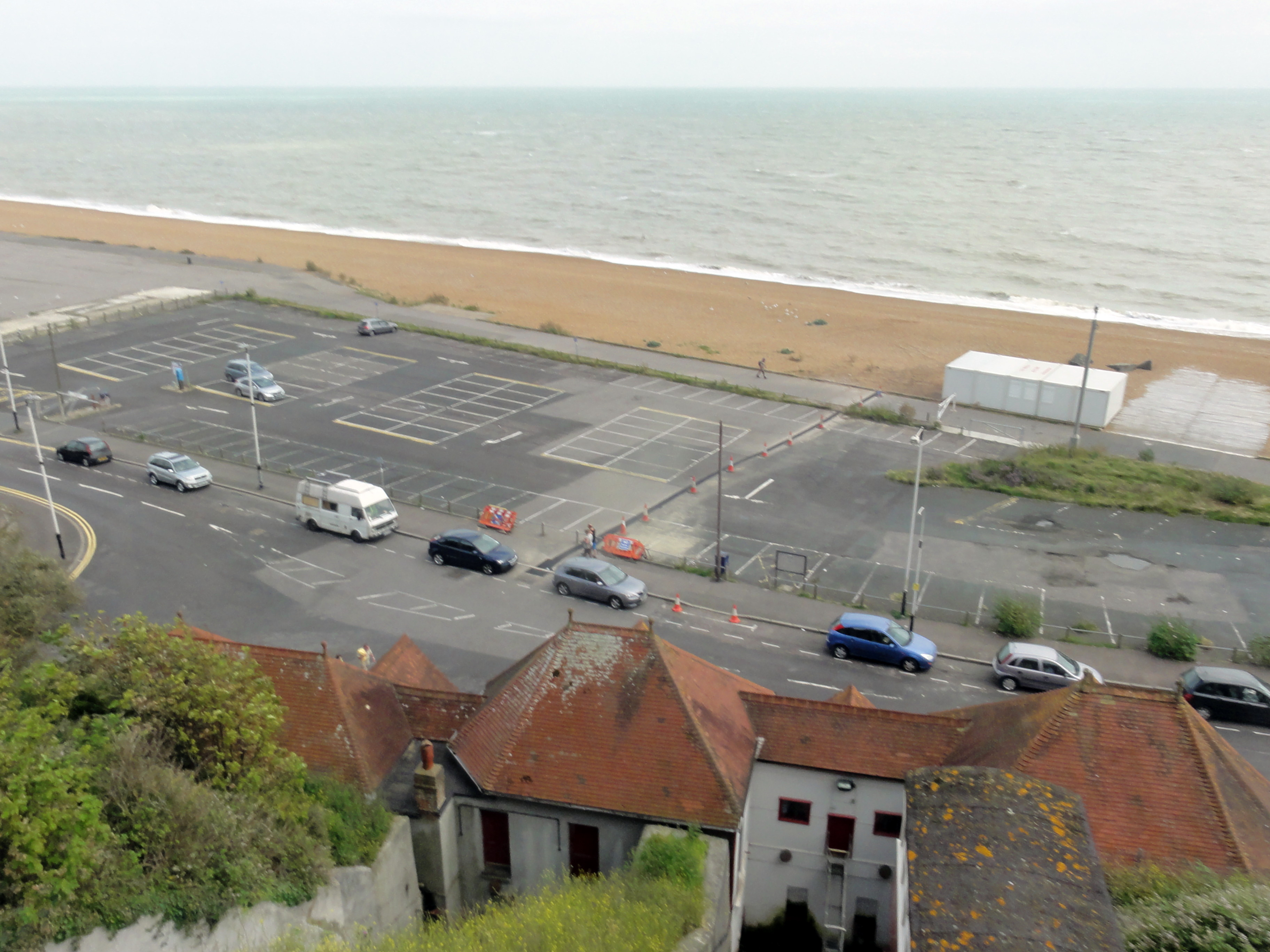
- Former Site of Folkestone Lifeboat Station, now redeveloped.

- Folkestone, Kent

General information
- Status: Closed
- Type: RNLI Lifeboat Station
- Location: Marine Parade, Folkestone, Kent, England
- Coordinates: 51°04′36.5″N 1°10′45.5″E
- Opened: 1893
- Closed: 1930

Website
- Folkestone rescue

Folkestone RNLI Station, not to be confused with Folkestone Rescue, was a former lifeboat Station located on the shore side of Marine Parade, between the Leas Lift and Marine Gardens, in the harbour town of Folkestone, in the county of Kent.

A lifeboat station was first established here in 1893 by the Royal National Lifeboat Institution (RNLI).

Folkestone lifeboat station was closed in 1930.

In 2014, Folkestone Rescue was established as an independent lifeboat service, a development from a lifeguard service set up at Sunny Sands in 2006. For further information, please see the website link.

== History ==
The first "Lifeboat" to be placed at Folkestone, was in fact a steam lifeboat, named the Jubilee Life Saving Ship No.1. Her life-saving equipment included lifelines and lifebuoys, and a ‘resuscitation cabin’ containing a large bath and hot water. It had been provided in 1887 by the South Eastern Railway Company, in response to two disasters that occurred off the Kent coast, and to mark the Golden Jubilee of Queen Victoria.

On 22 January 1873, the full-rigged ship Northfleet was at anchor 3 miles (4.8 km) off Dungeness in thick fog, when it was rammed by the steamship Murillo of Spain. 293 lives were lost. The Murillo never stopped.

Then, on 31 May 1878, the Großer Kurfürst was also rammed, by the König Wilhelm, and sank off Folkestone with the loss of 284 lives.

In her 12-years at Folkestone, the Jubilee Life Saving Ship No.1 ended up being used for other purposes, and was never called upon for a rescue. She was sold in 1899.

It would be another wreck that would prompt the RNLI to establish a lifeboat station at Folkestone. Lydd and Sandgate lifeboats were launched to the vessel Benvenue at Sandgate, Kent on 11 November 1891, but both capsized. The Sandgate lifeboat would eventually rescue 27 survivors, but three lives were lost, including the Master and an apprentice off the Benvenue, and a lifeboatman by the name of Fagg.

A 38-foot (12-Oared) Self-righting 'pulling and sailing' (P&S) lifeboat, one with oars and sails, arrived at Folkestone on 4 December 1893. The boat had been funded by Miss Curling of Denmark Hill, London, and was named J. McConnell Hussey (ON 343). A lifeboat house was constructed on Marine Parade, near the Leas Lift, at a cost of £779-5s-7d.

On Sunday 24 November 1895, the J. McConnell Hussey was launched to the aid of the lugger Perseverance (249), which had been disabled in a gale, and had drifted all night. The crew were rescued and brought ashore, witnessed by a large crowd.

The J. McConnell Hussey would serve at Folkestone for 10 years, launching six times and saving 10 lives. The lifeboat was later converted to be motor-powered, and served at Newhaven, Tynemouth and Sunderland.

A new 35-foot lifeboat, constructed by Thames Ironworks, was sent to Folkestone on 20 March 1903. The boat was funded from the legacy of Miss Katherine Skynner of Brighton, and at a ceremony on 30 January 1904 was named Leslie (ON 508).

On Wed 5 October 1904, the good weather gradually began the change, and by 9:00pm, a gale was raging. The Folkestone fishing fleet had not yet returned, and concern began to grow. Gradually, boats began to return, but not all. At 10:00pm, flares were seen at the foot of Copt Point. Rocket maroons were set off to alert the lifeboat crew. Such were the conditions that the lifeboat Leslie couldn't get away straight away. More helpers were requested, the boat finally getting away at 10:50pm. The smack Good Intent (FE–21) had been disabled and driven ashore. Approaching the vessel, the lifeboat was hit by a large wave. Two lifeboatmen, L. Saunders and J. Spearpoint, were washed overboard, but were recovered to the boat. Setting anchor and veering down, the three crew of the Good Intent were rescued. Three other vessels had not been so fortunate, with two fishing boats wrecked, and an Eastbourne fishing smack (NN–21) with three crew was lost. At daybreak, the Good Intent could be seen lying smashed to pieces at the foot of Copt Point, with the mast of NN–21 protruding from the sea nearby. For his service, Coxswain Stephen Cook was awarded the RNLI Silver Medal

On 13 July 1927, the Folkestone lifeboat fundraising 'Flag-Day', the station was visited by H.R.H. Prince Henry during a tour of the area, inspecting the lifeboat and meeting the crew.

In 27-years service, the Leslie would be launched 21 times, and save 16 lives. However, with a huge decline in the number of sailing vessels, and with motor lifeboats placed at Dover, Eastbourne, and soon to be at Hastings, the days were numbered for Folkestone. Folkestone Lifeboat Station closed on 16 October 1930.

The lifeboat remained on exhibition at the boathouse in Folkestone for a further 6 years, before being sold. The building was handed back to the landowner, and later demolished. The site was used as a car park for many years, but has recently been developed into apartments.

== Station honours ==
The following are awards made at Folkestone.

- RNIPLS Silver Medal

Lt. Gustaves Spicker Baker, RN, H.M. Coastguard – 1831

Lt. Frederick Coppin, RN, H.M. Coastguard – 1839

John Town, Chief Boatman, H.M. Coastguard – 1847

- RNLI Silver Medal

Stephen Cook, Coxswain Superintendent – 1904

== Folkestone RNLI lifeboats ==
ON (Note: ON is the RNLI's Official Number of the boat.)	Name	On Station	Class	Comments
343	J. McConnell Hussey	1893–1903	38-foot Self-righting (P&S)	(Note: 38-foot (12-Oared) Self-righting (P&S) lifeboat, built by W. T. Ellis of Lowestoft, costing £418.)
508	Leslie	1903–1930	35-foot Self-righting (P&S)	(Note: 35-foot (10-Oared) Self-righting (P&S) lifeboat, built by Thames Ironworks, costing £788.)

== See also ==
- Independent lifeboats in Britain and Ireland
- List of former RNLI stations
- List of RNLI stations
- Royal National Lifeboat Institution lifeboats
