= Little and Broad Haven Lifeboat Station =

RNLI lifeboat station in Pembrokeshire, Wales

- Gorsaf Bad Achub Little and Broad Haven

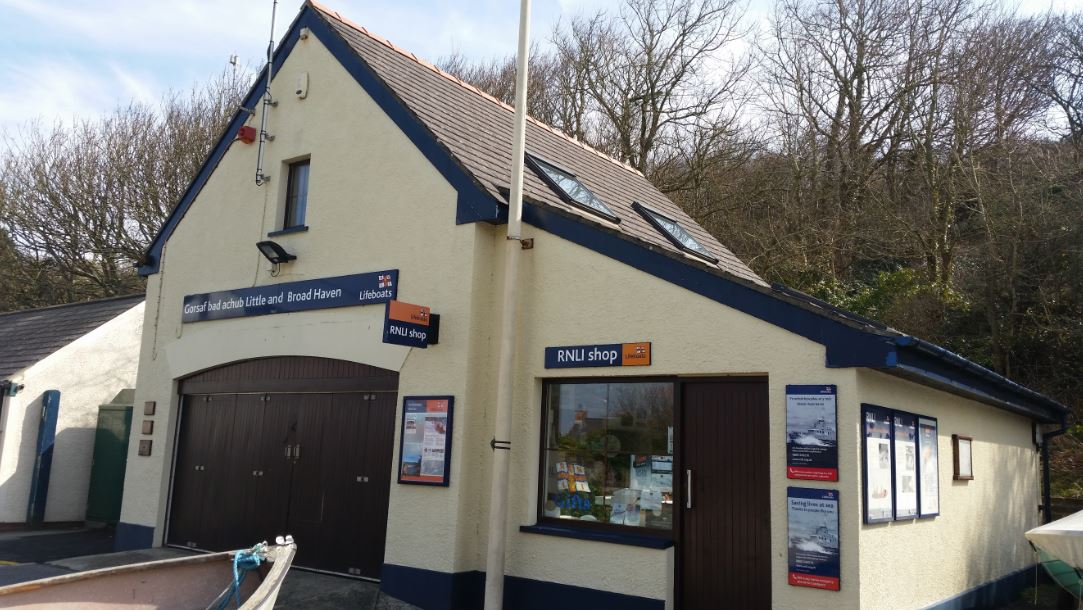
- Lifeboat station and adjoining RNLI shop

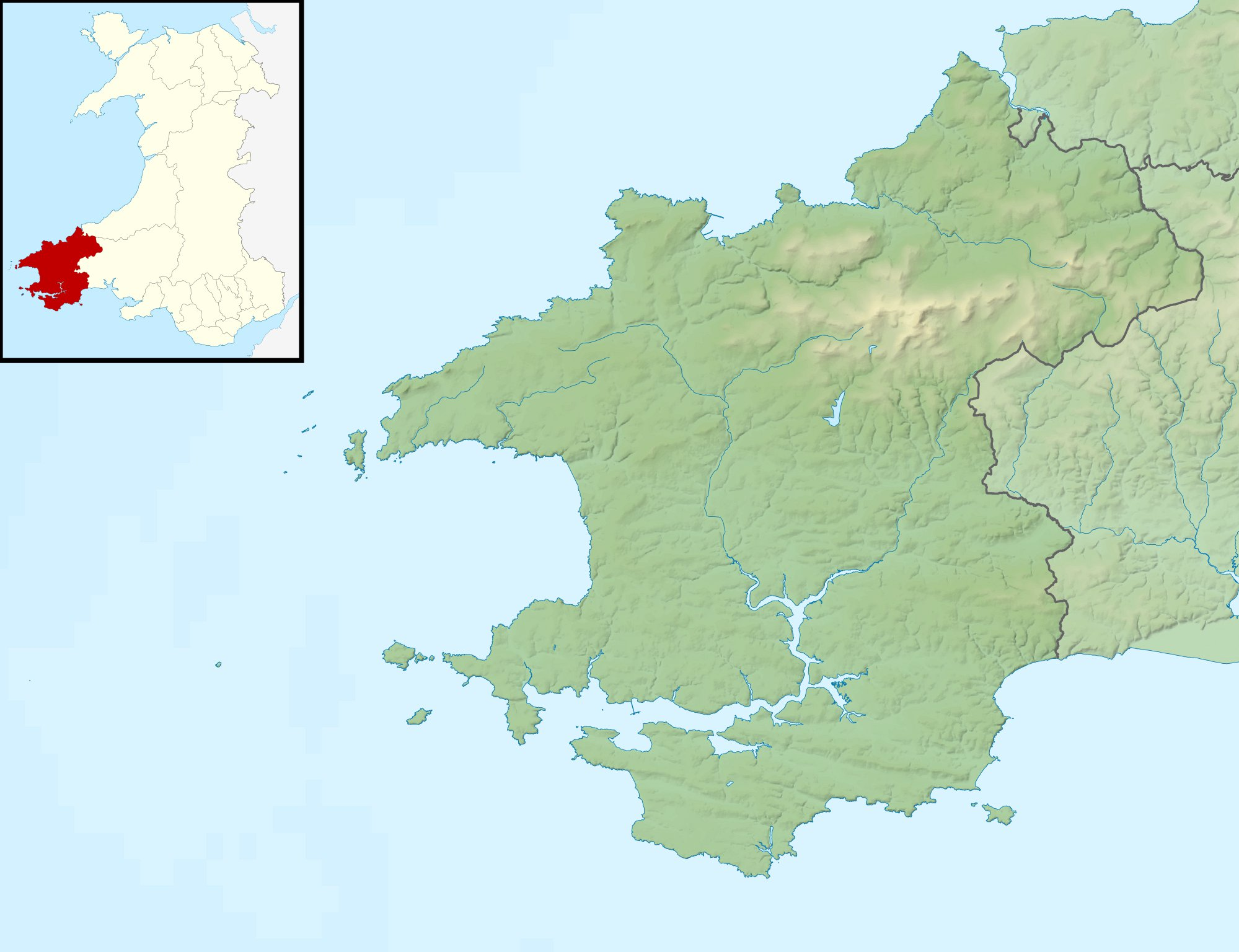
- Location within Pembrokeshire
- Former names: Little Haven Lifeboat Station

General information
- Type: RNLI Lifeboat Station
- Location: The Boathouse, Grove Place, Little Haven, Haverfordwest, Pembrokeshire, Wales, SA62 3UF, UK
- Coordinates: 51.7731°N 5.1071°W
- Opened: 1882–1921; 1967–present (ILB)
- Owner: Royal National Lifeboat Institution

Website
- Little and Broad Haven RNLI

Little and Broad Haven Lifeboat Station is located at Grove Place in Little Haven, Pembrokeshire, a village approximately 7 mi (11 km) west of Haverfordwest, overlooking St Bride's Bay, in the Pembrokeshire Coast National Park, on the coast of West Wales.

A lifeboat was first placed at Little Haven in 1882 by the Royal National Lifeboat Institution (RNLI), remaining in operation until 1921. The station reopened in 1967 under its present name, and serves the area in St Bride's Bay surrounding Little Haven and Broad Haven resorts. When it was built it was the RNLI's smallest lifeboat station.

The station currently operates a D-class (IB1) inshore lifeboat, Swaine-Legane (D-899), on station since February 2025.

== History ==
The report of the Chief Inspector of Lifeboats was read at the meeting of the RNLI committee of management on Thursday 6 October 1881, following a visit to both Broad Haven and Little Haven. A 33-foot self-righting 'Pulling and Sailing' (P&S) lifeboat, one with both sails and (10) oars, previously stationed at Ardrossan, was dispatched to Little Haven Lifeboat Station, where it was "thought desirable to station a Life-boat there for use in St. Bride's Bay."

The lifeboat was transported to Milford Haven by the Great Western Railway, from where it was rowed to the station by its crew. The costs of the lifeboat were defrayed from a legacy of Mr C. J. Corker of Ramsgate, and in accordance with his wishes, it was named Friend. The lifeboat was moored afloat, approximately 1.5 mi (2.4 km) to the south of the village, under Goultrop Head.

In just 21 years between 1882 and 1903, Little Haven would be home to a succession of four lifeboats. In 1885, the first Little Haven lifeboat, by now 15 years old, was replaced with a larger 35-foot lifeboat, previously stationed at Hythe. The lifeboat was also renamed Friend. The third boat arrived in 1893, followed by a relief boat in 1901.

In 1903, the 40-foot Watson-class (P&S) lifeboat William Roberts (ON 505) was sent to the station. A new lifeboat house with slipway was constructed at Goultrop, at a cost of £1600.

It was resolved to closed the Little Haven Lifeboat Station at a meeting of the RNLI committee of management on Friday 18 March 1921. There was reduced need for the service, with cover available from St Davids and Angle. The lifeboat on station at the time of closure, William Roberts (ON 505), was transferred to the relief fleet. Nothing remains of the 1903 boathouse.

== Inshore lifeboat station ==
In 1964, in response to an increasing amount of water-based leisure activity, the RNLI placed 25 small fast Inshore lifeboats around the country. These were easily launched with just a few people, ideal to respond quickly to local emergencies.

More Inshore lifeboat stations were established, and in May 1967, the RNLI reopened the station at Little Haven, now being known as Little and Broad Haven Lifeboat Station. A boathouse was built by the Rural District Council, and a D-class (RFD PB16) Inshore lifeboat (D-124) was placed in service.

A dedicated boathouse was built in 1992, which along with better crew facilities and a kit drying room, incorporated a souvenir outlet.

On 23 September 1995, a family of two adults and four children became stranded at the bottom of the cliffs, when their dinghy was swamped at Nolton Haven beach. The Inshore lifeboat Sybil (D-484) was launched at 13:41, into force 5 conditions. Arriving on scene, the lifeboat was anchored, and veering down, got close enough for crew member Brian Dilly to go ashore, who carried the children from a rocky ledge back to the boat, one by one, passing them to the care of David Love. With the mother finally aboard, they were all landed at Druidston beach. The lifeboat then returned, and stood by, whilst the coastguard team rescued the father, who had been stuck 50 ft (15 m) up the cliff, having climbed up so far in an attempted to summon help. After being lowered down the cliff, he was picked up by the lifeboat, and landed at the beach. Helm Crispin Williamson was awarded the RNLI Bronze Medal, in recognition of his courage, initiative and seamanship. Crew members Brian Dilly and David Love were accorded "The Thanks of the Institution inscribed on Vellum".

In the 2017 New Years Honours, crew member of 17 years, Vivienne Grey, was awarded the MBE, for services to the RNLI and Maritime Safety. It was reported that during those 17 years, she had been involved in 120 calls, and was directly responsible for saving eight lives.

At a ceremony on 19 July 2025, a new D-class (IB1) Inshore lifeboat was handed to the care of the Little and Broad Haven branch of the Institution. A service of dedication was led by Paul Mackness, Archdeacon of St Davids. The lifeboat was funded by the Laurence Misener Charitable Trust, founded by Laurence Misener, then managing director of the Savile Row tailors Anderson and Sheppard. His succeeding Trustees were Captain George Swaine, and Jill Legane, and their names were given to the new lifeboat, which was then named by Ms Legane. After a rendition of 'Home From The Sea' by the Haverfordwest Male Voice Choir, the lifeboat was launched on demonstration to the assembled crowd, joined by the Tamar-class lifeboats from Angle and St Davids.

== Station honours ==
The following are awards made at Little & Broad Haven:

- RNLI Bronze Medal
  Crispin Williamson, Helm – 1995
- Thanks of the Institution Inscribed on Vellum
  Brian Dilly – 1995
  David Love – 1995
- A Framed Letter of Thanks signed by the Chairman of the Institution
  Crispin Wiliamson, Helm – 2004
- Member, Order of the British Empire (MBE)
  Vivienne Mary Latimer Grey – 2017NYH

== Little and Broad Haven lifeboats ==
=== Pulling and Sailing (P&S) lifeboats ===
ON (Note: ON is the RNLI's Official Number of the boat.)	Name	Built	On station	Class	Comments
Pre-542	Friend	1870	1882–1885	33-foot Peake self-righting (P&S)	(Note: 33 ft 0 in (10.06 m) x 8 ft 0 in (2.44 m) (10-oared) Peake-class self-righting (P&S) lifeboat, gift of Mr P. Reid of London, built by Woolfe of Shadwell, London, costing £278 when new. Later funded as Friend from the legacy of Mr C. J. Corker of Ramsgate.); Previously Fair Maid of Perth at Ardrossan. Sold in 1885.
58	Friend	1876	1885–1893	35-foot self-righting (P&S)	(Note: 35-foot x 9-foot 2in (10-oared) self-righting (P&S) lifeboat, gift of Miss H. de Rothschild of London, built by Woolfe of Shadwell, London, costing £397 when new. Later funded as Friend from the legacy of Mr C. J. Corker of Ramsgate.); Previously Mayer de Rothschild at Hythe. Sold in 1893.
347	David Pickard	1893	1893–1901	39-foot self-righting (P&S)	(Note: 39-foot x 9-foot (12-oared) self-righting (P&S) lifeboat, legacy of Mr A. Pickard of Leeds, built by Forrestt of Limehouse, London, costing £587.); Sold in 1901
291	Christopher North Graham	1890	1901–1903	39-foot self-righting (P&S)	(Note: 39-foot x 9-foot (12-oared) self-righting (P&S) lifeboat, gift of Mrs North Graham & family, built by Forrestt of Limehouse, London, costing £577.); Previously at Thorpeness. Transferred to Longhope.
505	William Roberts	1903	1903–1921	40-foot Watson (P&S)	(Note: 40-foot x 11-foot (12-oared) Watson-class non-self-righting (P&S) lifeboat, legacy of Mr W. Roberts of Manchester, built by Thames Ironworks, costing £1,606.); Transferred to the relief fleet. Later at Southend-on-Sea.

Station closed in 1921
Pre ON numbers are unofficial numbers used by the Lifeboat Enthusiasts' Society to reference early lifeboats not included on the official RNLI list.

=== Inshore lifeboats ===
==== D class ====
Op.No. (Note: Op. No. is the RNLI's Operational Number of the boat carried on the hull.)	Name	On station	Class	Comments
D-124	Unnamed	1967–1975	D-class (RFD PB16)	
D-242	Unnamed	1976–1987	D-class (Zodiac III)	
D-347	Unnamed	1987–1995	D-class (EA16)	
D-484	Sybil	1995–2004	D-class (EA16)	
D-628	Austin Burnett	2004–2014	D-class (IB1)	
D-766	Jack & Edith May	2014–2025	D-class (IB1)	
D-899	Swaine-Legane	2025–	D-class (IB1)	

== See also ==
- List of RNLI stations
- List of former RNLI stations
- Royal National Lifeboat Institution lifeboats
