= Clyde-class lifeboat =

Former RNLI lifeboat class

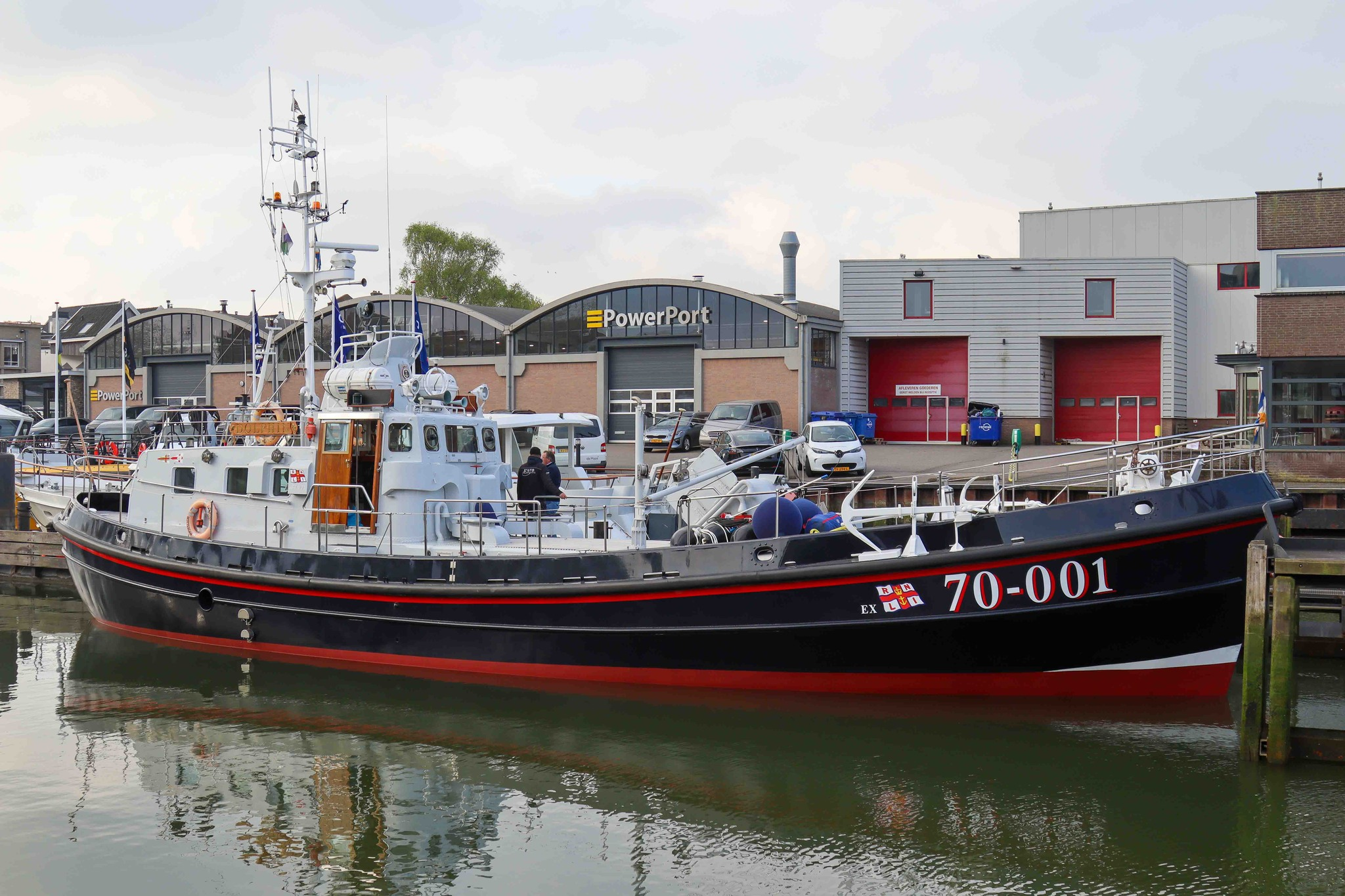
- RNLB 70-001 Charles H. Barrett (Civil Service No.35) (ON 1030), now Dolphin at Maassluis, 2022

Class overview
- Builders: Yarrow Shipbuilders of Glasgow (70-001 & 70-002); Bideford Shipyard 1973 Ltd. of Bideford (70-003)
- Operators: Royal National Lifeboat Institution; Iceland SAR
- Cost: £63,907 (70-001); £65,113 (70-002), £196,000 (70-003)
- Built: 1965–66, 1974
- In service: 1968–2002
- Completed: 3
- Retired: 3

General characteristics
- Type: Motor lifeboat
- Displacement: 78–85 tons
- Length: 70–71 ft (21–22 m)
- Beam: 17–18 ft (5.2–5.5 m)
- Draft: 9 ft (2.7 m)
- Installed power: Twin Gardner 8L3B 230 bhp (170 kW) diesel engines
- Propulsion: Twin screw
- Speed: 11.5 knots (21.3 km/h; 13.2 mph)
- Range: 1,700 nmi (3,100 km)

The Clyde-class lifeboat was operated by the Royal National Lifeboat Institution (RNLI) from just two of its stations in the United Kingdom, Kirkwall and Clovelly. Only three vessels were built for the RNLI, however a fourth vessel was built in the Netherlands to the same lines as 70-001 and 70-003, as a pilot boat for Trinity House.

== History ==
Following a visit in the early sixties to lifeboat societies in the Netherlands and West Germany, which successfully employed cruising lifeboats, the RNLI's Management Committee decided to sanction the construction of two such boats for RNLI service. The first two boats went on trials in 1966 and in 1968 went on station at Clovelly and Kirkwall. The third boat was built as a relief but took over as station boat at Clovelly, with the first boat becoming the relief. It eventually became apparent that cruising type boats were not really suited to the RNLI's operations and the boats were used at their respective bases as normal lifeboats until withdrawal in 1988.

== Description ==
The Clyde-class cruising lifeboat was the largest ever built for the RNLI, and the first to have a steel hull. The first and second boats differed in hull design, Charles H. Barrett (Civil Service No.35) (ON 987) having a hull designed by the RNLI's Richard Oakley, 71 feet (22 m) long and with a beam of 18 feet (5.5 m), while the second boat, Grace Paterson Ritchie (ON 988), had a hull designed by Irish naval architect John Tyrrell and was 70 feet (21 m) long and with a beam of 17 feet (5.2 m). Both boats had similar superstructure layouts, with a flying bridge. As crews were intended to live on board, berths and messing facilities were provided.

The boats were powered by two 230 brake horsepower (170 kW) Gardner 8L3B 8-cylinder diesel engines, driving twin screws. An inflatable inshore lifeboat was carried forward of the wheelhouse.

Eight years after the first boat had been built, it was decided to build a third Clyde as a relief boat for the first two. This was based on the Oakley hull design, but featured a completely redesigned superstructure resembling an overgrown Arun.

== RNLI fleet ==
ON (Note: ON is the RNLI's Official Number of the boat.)	Op. No. (Note: Op. No. is the RNLI's Operational Number of the boat carried on the hull.)	Name	Built	In service	Station	Comments
987	70-001	Charles H. Barrett (Civil Service No.35)	1965	1966–1968	Trials	(Note: 71 ft 0 in (21.64 m) x 18 ft 0 in (5.49 m) lifeboat, gift of the Civil Service LB fund, built by Yarrow Shipbuilders of Scotstoun, Glasgow, with twin 230-hp Gardner 8L3B diesel engines, costing £63,907.) Sold 1988. Renamed Poplar Diver. Now Dolphin, at Maassluis, NL, July 2025. MMSI 244070415
987	70-001	Charles H. Barrett (Civil Service No.35)	1965	1968–1975	Clovelly	Sold 1988. Renamed Poplar Diver. Now Dolphin, at Maassluis, NL, July 2025. MMSI 244070415
987	70-001	Charles H. Barrett (Civil Service No.35)	1965	1975–1988	Relief fleet	Sold 1988. Renamed Poplar Diver. Now Dolphin, at Maassluis, NL, July 2025. MMSI 244070415
988	70-002	Grace Paterson Ritchie	1965	1966–1967	Ullapool	(Note: 70 ft 0 in (21.34 m) x 17 ft 0 in (5.18 m) lifeboat, legacy of Miss G. P. Ritchie, built by Yarrow Shipbuilders of Scotstoun, Glasgow, with twin 230-hp Gardner 8L3B diesel engines, costing £65,113.) Sold to Iceland SAR, named Henry A. Hálfdánsson, 1989. See below:–
988	70-002	Grace Paterson Ritchie	1965	1967–1968	Relief fleet	Sold to Iceland SAR, named Henry A. Hálfdánsson, 1989. See below:–
988	70-002	Grace Paterson Ritchie	1965	1968–1974	Kirkwall	Sold to Iceland SAR, named Henry A. Hálfdánsson, 1989. See below:–
988	70-002	Grace Paterson Ritchie	1965	1974–1975	Relief fleet	Sold to Iceland SAR, named Henry A. Hálfdánsson, 1989. See below:–
988	70-002	Grace Paterson Ritchie	1965	1975–1988	Kirkwall	Sold to Iceland SAR, named Henry A. Hálfdánsson, 1989. See below:–
1030	70-003	City of Bristol	1974	1975–1988	Clovelly	(Note: 71 ft 0 in (21.64 m) x 18 ft 0 in (5.49 m) lifeboat, gift of the Bristol LB appeal, plus legacies of Mrs Rimer, Dr Riddick, Mr Vagg and Mrs Shrosbee, built by Bideford Shipyard 1973 Ltd, of Bideford, with twin 230-hp Gardner 8L3B diesel engines, costing £196,000.) Sold 1988. Renamed John V Story, City of Bristol and Gemini Storm. Now Gemini Explorer, last reported at Loch Drambuie, Sound of Mull, June 2024. MMSI 235084267

== Other fleets ==
=== Iceland ===
RNLI ON	Name	ISL Reg. No. (Note: ISL Reg No. is the Icelandic Vessel Registration number)	In service	Station	Comments
988	Henry A. Hálfdansson	2001	1989–2002	Reykjavík	Sold 2002. Renamed Grace Paterson Richie, at Coleraine, Northern Ireland. MMSI 235014516

=== Trinity House fleet ===
Name	Built	In service	Service	Comments
Lodesman	1974	1974–1988	Heavy weather pilot vessel	MV Lodesman, with Roving Eye Enterprises, Orkney. MMSI 235076219

== See also ==
- Royal National Lifeboat Institution lifeboats
