= RNLB Abdy Beauclerk =

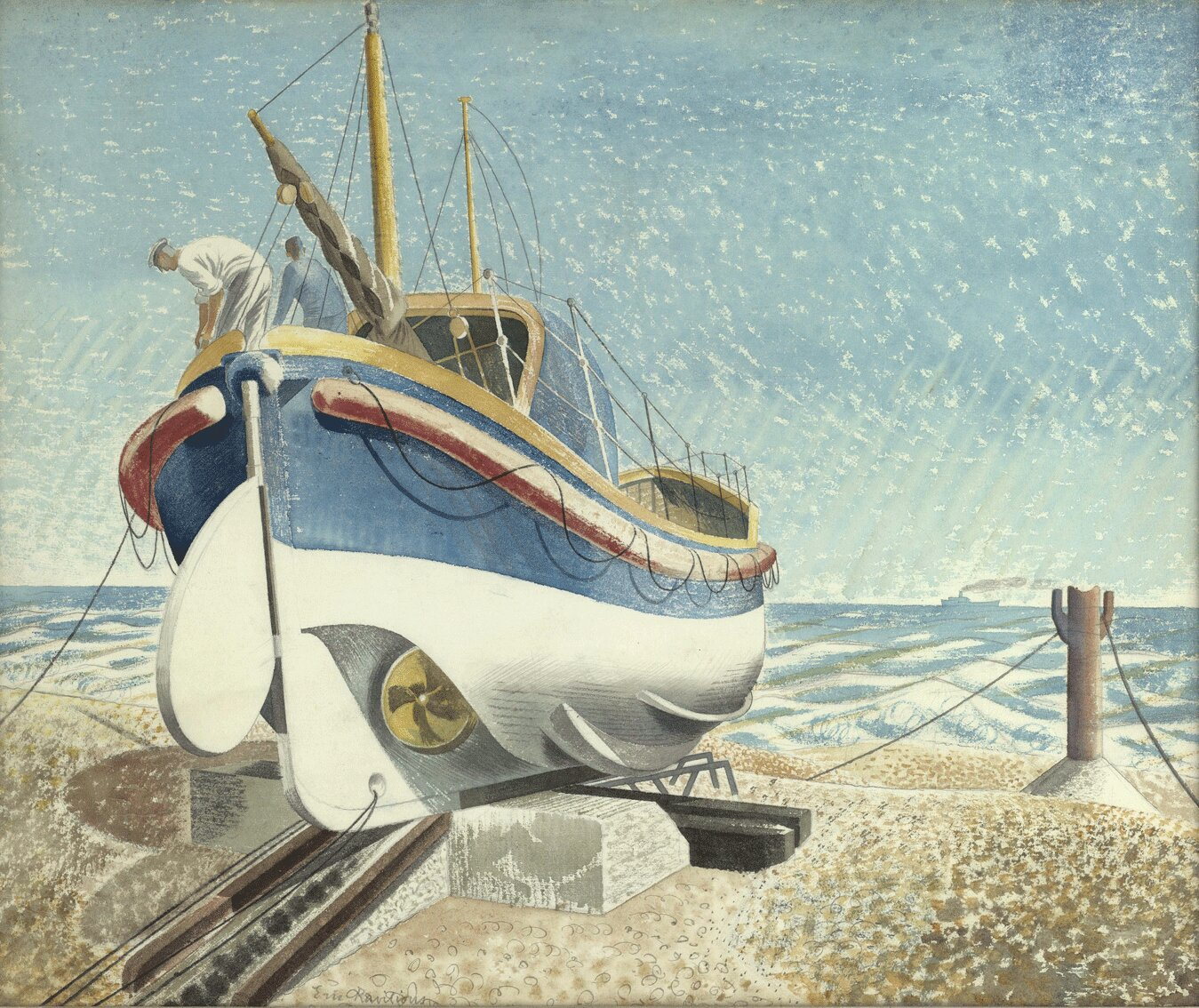
- Abdy Beauclerk by Eric Ravilious

History

British RNLI Flag
- Owner: Royal National Lifeboat Institution (RNLI)
- Builder: J. Samuel White, Cowes, Isle of Wight
- Official Number: ON 751
- Station: No: 1 Station Aldeburgh
- Laid down: 1931
- Acquired: 1931
- Fate: Used as pilot vessel for; Cork Harbour Commissioners and renamed St. Ita

General characteristics
- Class & type: 41ft Beach 'Aldeburgh' Motor Lifeboat
- Tonnage: Displacement of 16 tons
- Length: 41 ft 0 in (12.50 m) overall
- Beam: 12 ft 3 in (3.73 m)
- Installed power: 2 x 35hp AEC Weyburn petrol
- Propulsion: Twin screw set in tunnels
- Speed: 7.5 kn (13.9 km/h)
- Range: 122 nmi (226 km)
- Notes: Also fitted with a mizzen mast and sail.

RNLB Abdy Beauclerk (ON 751) was a 41ft 'Aldeburgh' Type Beach Motor which was stationed in the town of Aldeburgh in the English county of Suffolk. She was on the No: 1 station at Aldeburgh from 1931 until she was sold out of the RNLI fleet in 1959, a total of 28 years service.

== Description ==
The Abdy Beauclerk was the first of five 'Aldeburgh' type motor beach lifeboats built. She was built in 1931 by J. Samuel White in Cowes on the Isle of Wight. Some stations around the coast such as Aldeburgh required a larger heavier boat than other motor life boats such as the Liverpool class. The flat nature of the foreshore at some stations precluded the use of slipways and with no suitable harbour facilities to hand it was not possible for stations such as Aldeburgh to keep a heavy Watson or Barnett-class lifeboat on station. The beach design was 41 feet long and 12 foot 3 inches wide and weighed just under 16 tons. The wide beam of the lifeboat made up for her shallow draught. She was fitted with twin screws, with the propellers housed in tunnels to protected them when being launched or hauled back up the beach. The lifeboat was powered by two 35 horse power Weyburn petrol engines which produced a top speed of 7.5 KT and gave her a range of 122 miles. Although this class of twin engine lifeboats no longer carried sails, the Aldeburgh crew requested that this lifeboat be fitted with a mizzen mast and sail as they preferred to have this arrangement.

The Abdy Beauclerk was paid for by a private legacy from the estate of William Abdy Beauclerk of Tower Court, Ascot, Berkshire, England; he was the grandson of William Beauclerk, 8th Duke of St Albans.

== Service history ==
The Abdy Beauclerk arrived in Aldeburgh in December 1931 and was officially launched in May 1932 by Prince Albert, Duke of York.

At 8:00 am on 23 November 1938, the lifeboat was launched to assist three barges in distress during heavy seas and a northerly gale. The barges were two and a half miles east of the station. The first of the barges, Grecian, refused help when the Abdy Beauclerk reached her. The second, the Astriid, had lost her topsail had damage to her spar and rigging. Two crewman were taken off her. The unnamed third barge also refused help. The Abdy Beauclerk returned to the Grecian, and this time took two crewman to safety. For his part in the rescue the coxswain of the Abdy Beauclerk, George Chatten, received an RNLI Bronze Medal.

The artist Eric Ravilious painted the Abdy Beauclerk in 1938; the painting is now in the Towner Gallery in Eastbourne.

=== Wartime service ===
During the Second World War the lifeboats along the coast of East Anglia contributed to many wartime rescues and services. The Abdy Beauclerk was the first English lifeboat to perform a wartime rescue, which occurred on 10 September 1939, just seven days after the declaration of war. The 8,641-ton merchantman SS Magdapur was en route from to Southampton when she either struck a mine or was torpedoed. The Magdapur began to sink by the bow. The Abdy Beauclerk assisted in the rescue of seventy survivors and the retrieval of one of six crewman who had been killed.

On 30 May 1940, the Abdy Beauclerk and the Lucy Lavers, which served Aldeburgh's No: 2 Station, were commandeered by the Royal Navy to assist in the Dunkirk evacuation. They remained there until 4 June 1940.

== Retirement from service ==
The Abdy Beauclerk remained on the No:1 station at Aldeburgh until 1959 when she was replaced with a 42 ft Watson-class lifeboat called Alfred and Patience Gottwald (ON 946). At the same time the No: 2 station was closed. Abdy Beauclerk was sold by the RNLI out of the service. She was renamed Saint Íte and she spent time working as a pilot vessel for Cork Harbour Commissioners, in the Republic of Ireland. She is believed to still be in Ireland.
