= SS Magdapur =

Coordinates: 52°11′N 1°43′E

History
- Name: SS Magdapur
- Owner: Thos & Jno Brocklebank, Liverpool
- Builder: Lithgows, Port Glasgow
- Yard number: 730
- Laid down: 1920
- Launched: 17 November 1920
- Identification: Code Letters GDXZ
- Fate: Mined and sunk 10 September 1939

General characteristics
- Type: Cargo ship
- Tonnage: 9,237 GRT until 1935; 8,641 GRT after 1935
- Length: 499.6 ft (152.3 m) until 1935; 473 ft (144 m) after 1935
- Beam: 64 ft (20 m)
- Draught: 34.2 ft (10.4 m)
- Installed power: Two steam turbines double reduction geared to single screw; 1,147 horsepower (855 kW); two double ended & two single ended boilers, 24 corrugated furnaces engine
- Propulsion: single propeller
- Speed: 13.5 knots (25.0 km/h; 15.5 mph)
- Capacity: 80 crew

SS Magdapur was a cargo ship mined and sunk off Thorpeness, Suffolk, by a Nazi German submarine in the Second World War.

The SS Magdapur sailed for the Brocklebank Line.

On 10 September 1939, one week after the declaration of war, she was underway in ballast from Tyne to Southampton, her master was Arthur Dixon. On that day she struck a mine laid by the German submarine U-13. She sank at 17:25. Six people died as a result of the attack, but 75 people were rescued from the sea by the Aldeburgh lifeboat Abdy Beauclerk. Her crew included lascars.
