= Clovelly Lifeboat Station =

RNLI lifeboat station in Devon, England

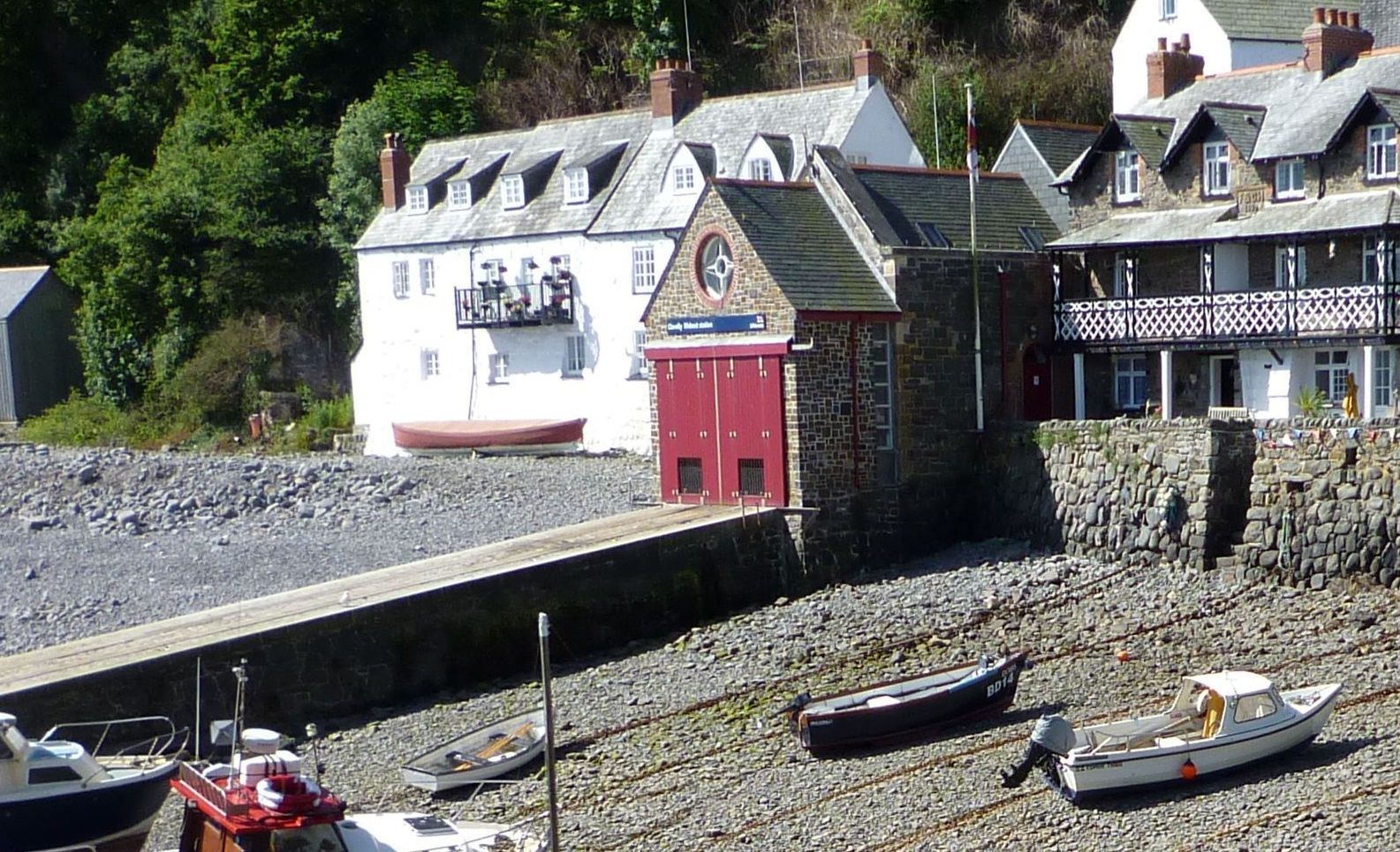
- Clovelly lifeboat station in 2010

- Location within Devon

General information
- Type: Lifeboat station
- Location: 62 The Quay, Clovelly, Bideford, Devon, EX39 5TF, United Kingdom
- Coordinates: 50.999°N 4.398°W
- Opened: 1870
- Cost: £175
- Owner: Royal National Lifeboat Institution

Website
- rnli.org/find-my-nearest/lifeboat-stations/clovelly-lifeboat-station

Listed Building – Grade II
- Feature: Lifeboat house with slipway
- Designated: 18 June 1989
- Reference no.: 1333114

Clovelly Lifeboat Station sits at the head of the harbour in Clovelly, a privately owned harbour village on the north-west coast of the county of Devon, England.

A lifeboat station was established at Clovelly in 1870 by the Royal National Lifeboat Institution (RNLI).

The station currently operates a B-class (Atlantic 85) Inshore lifeboat, Toby Rundle (B-872), on station since 2014.

== History ==
When the barque Odone of Genoa was wrecked at Portledge Mouth near Clovelly in a full gale on 12 September 1869, the 12 man crew and one passenger put off in the ship's longboat. They were brought to safety by 10 coastguards in a shore boat. Each of the coastguards was rewarded £1, with Chief Officer John Bumby also receiving the RNLI Silver Medal.

Following his subsequent visit to Clovelly, the report of the RNLI Inspector of Lifeboats was read and approved at a meeting of the RNLI committee of management on Thursday 4 November 1869, and in June 1870, a new lifeboat station was established at Clovelly with the arrival of a 33-foot Peake-class self-righting 'Pulling and Sailing' (P&S) lifeboat, one with sails and (10) oars, built by Forrestt at a cost of £320.

About eleven months since a shipwreck occurred near that place, and considerable risk was run by those who were fortunately enabled to effect the rescue of the crew by means of an ordinary open shore-boat; and although wrecks are not frequent in the bay, yet large ships are sometimes endangered in it, and there is a long distance between the adjoining life-boat stations at Bude Haven and Bideford; the place was therefore chosen as a life-boat station by the Society, there being a sufficient number of men to work the boat.

The lifeboat was funded by the gift of £700 from Mrs Boetefeur of London, in memory of her late husband Alexander, who had been a generous benefactor, and active member of the RNLI committee of management. The boat was initially transported by rail to Fremlington, before being launched into the River Taw. It was then rowed and sailed a distance of 15 miles (24 km) by the crew, accompanied by the Inspector of Lifeboats, to its new station at Clovelly, where a substantial boathouse had been constructed, at a cost of £175.

At a ceremony on 11 June 1870, with the village adorned with flags, and a good crowd of locals and visitors, a blessing was carried out by the Rev. Chichester, vicar of Clovelly, before Mrs Chichester named the lifeboat Alexander and Matilda Boetefeur (ON 230), as requested by the donor.

On 6 April 1882, Coxswain Richard Headon was awarded the RNLI Silver Medal in recognition of his gallant services, being involved in all launches of the Clovelly lifeboat, and saving 34 lives during the previous 12 years.
Services include (lives saved in brackets):

- 28 October 1870, herring boat Gem of Clovelly (1)
- 28 October 1870, fishing boat Sisters of Clovelly (1)
- 20 December 1871, schooner R. B. of Bayonne (7)
- 14 April 1874, ketch Minnie of Bideford (4)
- 1 October 1874, brigantine Elizabeth of Dublin (3)
- 3 September 1877, smack Ebenezer of Bideford (4)
- 9 February 1880, ketch Louisa of Bideford (4)
- 15 September 1880, smack Delabole of Fowey (3)
- 26 March 1882, ketch Bluebell of Padstow, (3)

A new boat house with slipway was constructed in 1892, at a cost of £1,065, in preparation for the arrival of a new lifeboat. The cost of the new 34 ft (10 m) boat was funded from the gift of £700 received from Mr John L. Roget, son of physician and lexicographer Peter Mark Roget, and his wife Francis. At a ceremony on Wednesday 10 May 1893, the lifeboat was blessed by the Rev. W. Harrison, vicar of Clovelly. Breaking a bottle of wine over the boat, Mrs Roget named the lifeboat Elinor Roget (ON 348), after their daughter.

The replacement lifeboat in 1907 was also funded by Mr and Mrs Roget, and the new 37 ft (11 m) lifeboat, built by Thames Ironworks, and costing £1,057, again took the name Elinor Roget (ON 573).

In 1908, the coxswain was Thomas Pengilly, who went on to become the then longest-serving coxswain in the service. A news article of 1935 noted that he had served Clovelly lifeboat for over 48 years, 14 as second coxswain and 24 as coxswain.

A newspaper report of 1916 described how the local women helped to launch the Clovelly lifeboat Elinor Roget in the event of fishermen being unavailable.

In the 32 years from 1899, the lifeboat saved 158 lives.

Thomas Pengilly retired in 1929 after 54 years of service to the RNLI; he was succeeded as coxswain by Alfred Braund, who in turn was succeeded in 1932 by J. J. Headon, who retired in 1936 at the age of 60 after 40 years' service.

27 years after the first motor-powered lifeboats were introduced by the RNLI, one would finally be placed at Clovelly. The City of Nottingham (ON 726), a 35-foot 6in self-righting motor-class lifeboat, was essentially a standard self-righting lifeboat with sails and oars, but with an added 35-hp Weyburn AE6 6-cylinder petrol engine. The boat was built in 1929, and had already served six years at Hythe.

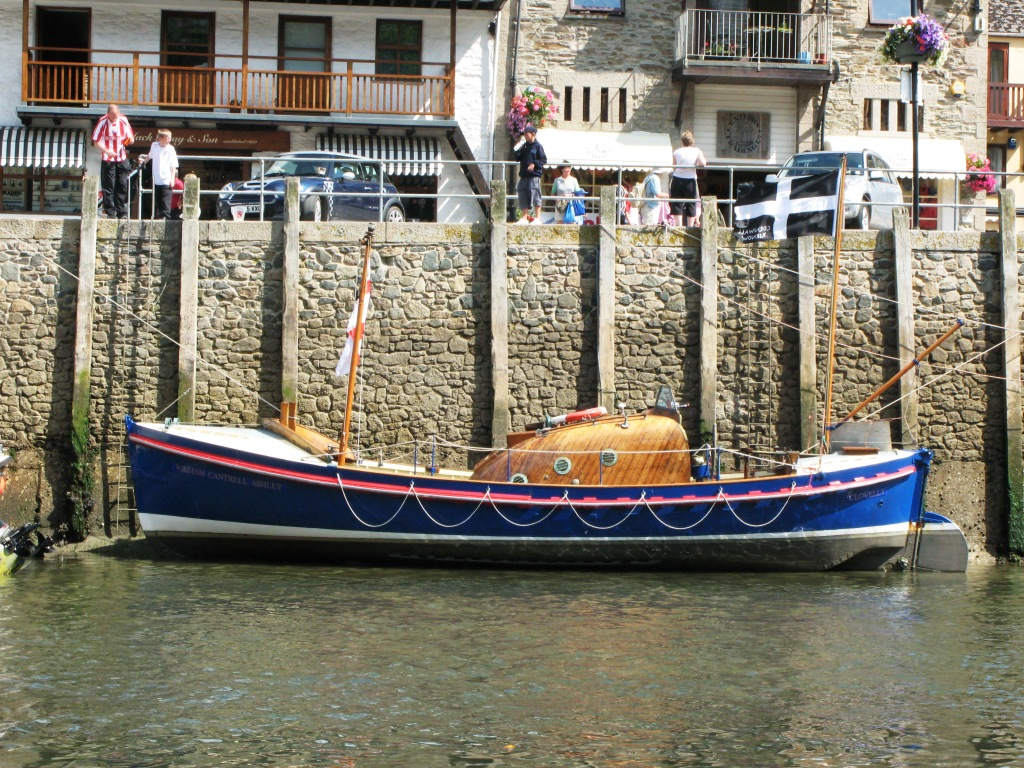
William Cantrell Ashley (ON 871)

In 1949, the station received a new Liverpool-class motor lifeboat, William Cantrell Ashley (ON 871), a 35 ft (11 m) self-righting vessel with twin 18-hp Weyburn AE4 petrol engines, equipped with a radio, and under the command of coxswain George Lamey. It was the fifth lifeboat in 80 years to be stationed at Clovelly. By 1950, the Clovelly lifeboats were reported to have saved 328 lives in their 80 years since being established.

The William Cantrell Ashley was sent away in 1863 to have diesel engines fitted, and was temporarily replaced until November 1964 by a Liverpool-class lifeboat from the reserve fleet. Clara and Emily Barwell (ON 893) had previously been on service at Eyemouth.

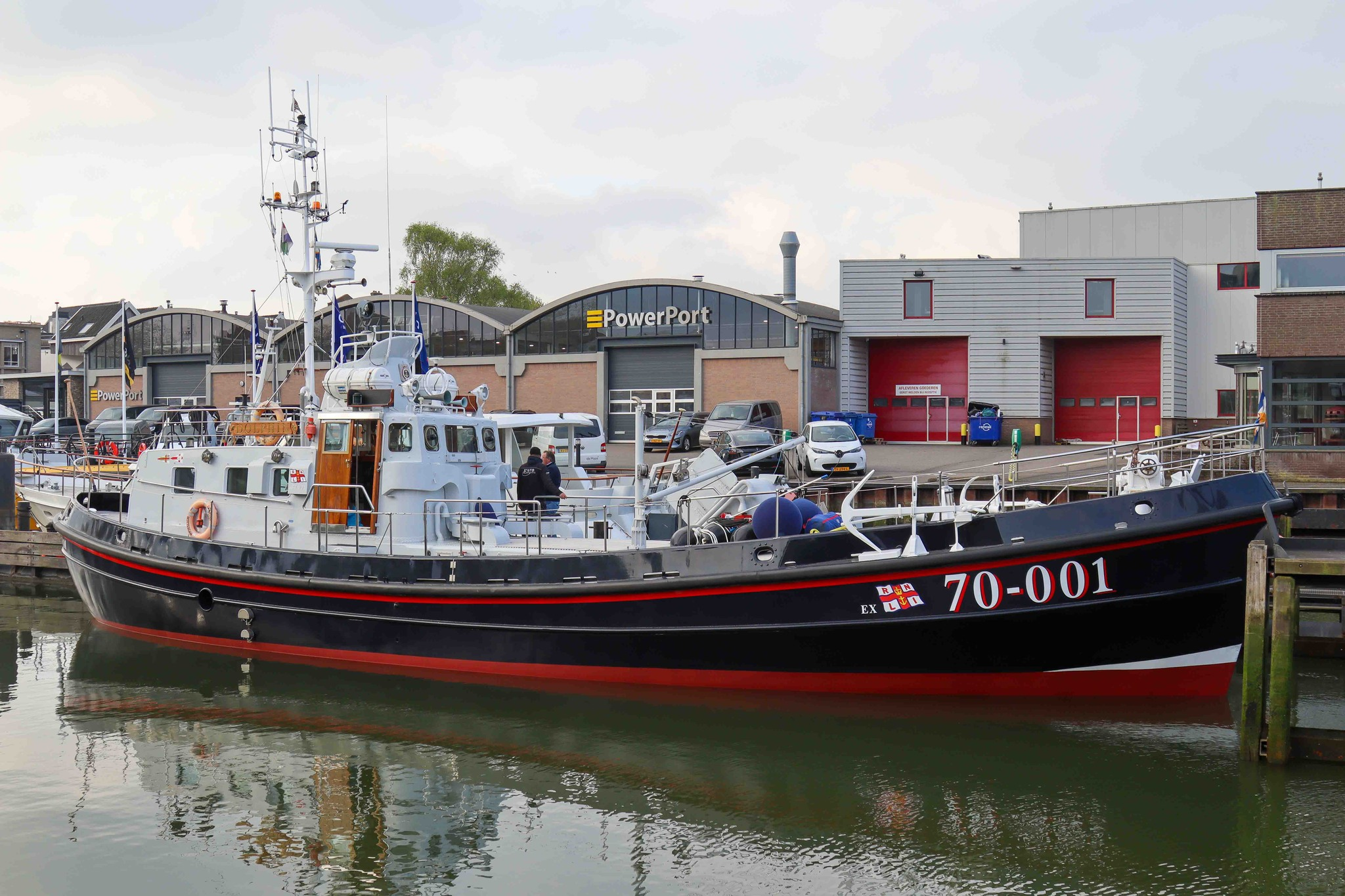
Clyde-class lifeboat 70-001 Charles H. Barrett (Civil Service No.35) (ON 987) in 2022

In the 1960s, the RNLI ordered two 70-foot Clyde-class lifeboats, to evaluate the benefits of operating larger offshore vessels, which could remain at sea for many days without re-fuelling, and were able to cover some of the more exposed waters. The first, 70-001 Charles H. Barrett (Civil Service No.35) (ON 987), costing £63,907, had a two-year trial period, and was then placed at Clovelly in 1968. The Liverpool lifeboat William Cantrell Ashley (ON 871) housed in the boathouse was withdrawn from the station, and for the next 20 years, Clovelly would operate a Clyde-class lifeboat, which was permanently afloat.

A third Clyde class lifeboat, City of Bristol (ON 1030), was built in 1974, as a relief lifeboat for the other two, at a cost of £196,000. In 1975, City of Bristol was permanently assigned to Clovelly, with the two others acting as relief lifeboat at various times.

In 1988, the three Clyde-class lifeboats were withdrawn from service. With fast lifeboats at Padstow and Appledore already covering the north Devon coast, the Clovelly lifeboat was not replaced, and the station closed on 15 August 1988. The lifeboat house was given Grade II status in 1989.

== 1990 onwards ==
Even though Clovelly operated a 70 ft (21 m) off-shore lifeboat, it carried a small D-class daughter boat, capable of close shore work. This asset was lost when the station was closed in 1988. Not wanting to be without a lifeboat, the residents of the village established the Clovelly Lifeboat Trust on 4 October 1989, and raised £60,000 for the provision of an 18 ft (5.5 m) RIB. The lifeboat, Pride of Clovelly, went on service in 1990, and operated for eight years from the former RNLI boathouse.

In 1998, management of the station was passed back to the RNLI. The B-class (Atlantic 21) Inshore lifeboat from the relief fleet, Foresters (B-531), and a Talus MBC Case 1150B launch tractor (T89), were placed at Clovelly, and were operational from 14 May 1998.

The lifeboat house was modified in 1999 so that the lifeboat and its tractor could be stored together. A separate building was provided in 2005 for a bulldozer, which is used to keep the beach in good shape for launching the lifeboat.

After briefly operating a second Atlantic 21 from the relief fleet, Round Table (B-543), the station received its permanent boat, Spirit of Clovelly (B-759), which was funded by the Clovelly Lifeboat Trust.

In 2011, Thomas Pengilly's great-great-granddaughter Lauren McGuire, 27, became Britain's youngest station manager, when she was appointed to Clovelly Lifeboat Station after 10 years' service with the RNLI. She is the fifth generation of her family to serve with Clovelly lifeboat. In the same year, a tragedy occurred when Clovelly Helm Jonny Staines went missing; his body was found at Hartland Quay.

After 15 years of service, Spirit of Clovelly was transferred to the relief fleet. A new B-class (Atlantic 85) Inshore lifeboat, Toby Rundle (B-872), was placed on service on 6 May 2014. As a suitable way of remembering their son and brother, who had always had a passion for lifeboats, and especially with his father Chris being a former Helm and latterly press officer at Minehead Lifeboat Station, more than £170,000 was raised by the efforts of the family of Williton student Toby Rundle (21), following his death soon after starting the third year of a Classics degree at Oxford University.

== Notable services ==
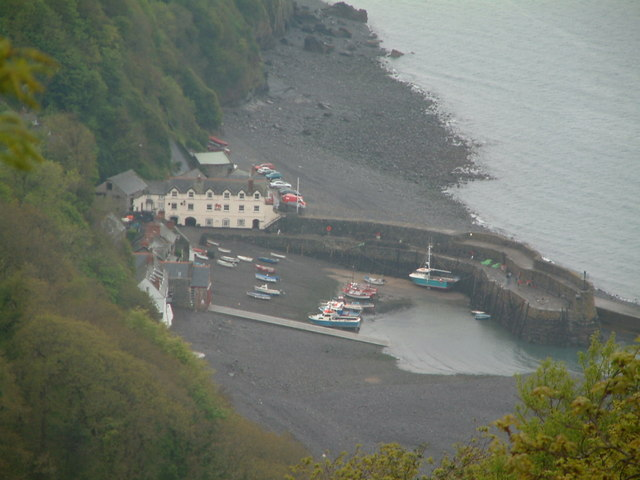
Clovelly Harbour with the lifeboat station and slipway on the left

During a gale on 16 August 1903, the lifeboat launched to two vessels in distress, the schooner Mary Stewart and the yacht Gadfly, rescuing both crews, eight people in all. On 12 February 1906, the steamship Peruvian (5,000 tons and 30 crew) was in Bideford Bay, having lost her rudder in stormy seas. The Clovelly lifeboat stood by for five hours during the night, until steam tugs could reach the vessel. The lifeboat rescued the six crew of the schooner Ianthe in a strong gale on 7 February 1913. The seven crew from the 3,000 tonne tanker Green Ranger were rescued in 1962, when she was wrecked off Hartland Point, after a towing cable parted.

== Station honours ==
Bowman Percy Shackson and Assistant Mechanic William Braund were each awarded the RNLI Bronze Medal in 1949, for the rescue of two Americans from a rock under the cliffs at Baggy Point on 30 August 1948. Impossible to get close enough with the lifeboat, the Coxswain called for two volunteers to use the dinghy, which had been strapped to the lifeboat before launching. The two men handled the dinghy with great skill and courage in the darkness and dangerous waters. 'The Thanks of the Institution inscribed on Vellum' was accorded to Coxswain George Lamey. The Maude Smith Award 1949 was awarded to Shackson and Braund for this service.

Coxswain George Lamey would later receive the bronze medal, for the rescue of the crew of three from the ketch Progress, in a north-westerly gale and very rough sea, on 28 July 1954. The lifeboat had to be brought under the lee of the ketch 10 times before the crew, as well as a cat, some new born kittens and a canary, were taken aboard.

The Clovelly lifeboat Charles H. Barrett (Civil Service No.35) was launched at 02:20 on 8 February 1974, to the Fishing trawler St Pierre, 26 mi (42 km) west of Hartland Point. For the safe recovery of the vessel to Ilfracombe, Staff Coxswain Michael Houchen, was awarded the bronze medal. The lifeboat had been at sea for 15 hours.

The following are awards made at Clovelly:

- RNLI Silver Medal
  John Bumby, Chief Officer, HM Coastguard, Clovelly – 1869
  Richard Headon, Coxswain – 1882
  Sidney Abbott, fisherman – 1890
  Robert Hodge, fisherman – 1890
- Silver Prize Medal, awarded by the Spanish Society for Saving the Shipwrecked
  George Lamey, Coxswain – 1950
- RNLI Bronze Medal
  Percy Shackson, Bowman – 1949
  William Braund, Assistant Mechanic – 1949
  George Lamey, Coxswain – 1954
  Michael Stafford Houchen, Staff Coxswain – 1974
- Maud Smith award 1949, (for the bravest act of lifesaving during the year by a member of a lifeboat crew).
  Percy Shackson, Bowman – 1949
  William Braund, Assistant Mechanic – 1949
- 'The Thanks of the Institution inscribed on Vellum'
  George Lamey, Coxswain – 1949
  Dr D. Mackenzie, the Honorary Medical Adviser – 1971
- 'A Framed Letter of Thanks signed by the Chairman of the Institution'
  The coxswain and crew – 1962
  R. G. Tanner, Boat Mechanic – 1972
  P. J. Croft, Boat Mechanic – 1972
  The Coxswain and crew members of the lifeboat City of Bristol – 1987
- A Special Framed Certificate
  The Coxswain and crew – 1979 (Fastnet Race)
- Diploma of Merit, awarded by the Spanish Society for Saving the Shipwrecked
  Clovelly Lifeboat Crew – 1950

== Roll of honour ==
In memory of those lost whilst serving at Clovelly.

- Died from the effects of exposure following service on 28 April 1902
  John Dunn, Bowman (61)

== Clovelly lifeboats ==
=== Pulling and Sailing lifeboats ===
On station	ON (Note: ON is the RNLI's Official Number of the boat.)	Name	Built	Class	Comments
1870–1881	230	Alexander and Matilda Boetefeur	1870	33-foot Peake self-righting (P&S)	(Note: 33 ft 0 in (10.06 m) x 8 ft 2 in (2.49 m) (10-oared) self-righting (P&S) lifeboat, gift of Mrs Boetefeur of London, built by Forrestt of Limehouse, London, costing £320.); Renamed Graham Hughes in 1881.
1881–1893	230	Graham Hughes	1870	33-foot Peake self-righting (P&S)	(Note: Further funded from the legacy of Mrs Hughes of London.); Damaged and broken up in 1893.
1893–1907	348	Elinor Roget	1893	34-foot self-righting (P&S)	(Note: 34 ft 0 in (10.36 m) x 8 ft 0 in (2.44 m) (10-oared) self-righting (P&S) lifeboat, gift of Mr and Mrs J. L. Roget, of Maida Hill, built by Forrestt of Limehouse, London, costing £423.); Transferred to Appledore.
1907–1936	573	Elinor Roget	1907	37-foot self-righting (P&S)	(Note: 37 ft 0 in (11.28 m) x 9 ft 3 in (2.82 m) (12-oared) self-righting (P&S) lifeboat, gift of Mr and Mrs J. L. Roget, built by Thames Ironworks of Blackwall, London, costing £1,057.); Sold in 1936. Renamed Daphne Too. Reported as Elinor Roget to have been broken up at Truro in 2013.

=== Motor lifeboats ===
On station	ON	Op.No. (Note: Op.No. is the RNLI's Operational Number of the boat carried on the hull.)	Name	Built	Class	Comments
1936–1949	726	—	City of Nottingham	1929	35-foot 6in self-righting (motor)	Previously at Hythe. Sold in 1950. Restored at Lawrenny Quay, Daugleddau estuary, Wales, January 2025.
1949–1968	871	—	William Cantrell Ashley	1949	Liverpool	Sold in 1968. Since 2013, based at Penarth Marina, September 2025.
1968–1975	987	70-001	Charles H. Barrett (Civil Service No.35)	1965	Clyde	Sold in 1988. Renamed Dolphin, at Maasluis, Netherlands, July 2025.
1975–1988	1030	70-003	City of Bristol	1974	Clyde	Sold in 1988. As Gemini Explorer at Loch Drambuie, Sound of Mull, June 2024.

Station closed in 1988.
More post-service details can be found on the respective lifeboat class pages.

=== Inshore lifeboats ===
On station	Op.No.	Name	Class	Comments
1990—1998	–	Pride of Clovelly	18 ft (5.5 m) RIB	Operated by the Clovelly Trust.
1998	B-531	Foresters	B-class (Atlantic 21)	First stationed at Great Yarmouth and Gorleston in 1975.
1998–1999	B-543	Round Table	B-class (Atlantic 21)	First stationed at Helensburgh in 1978.
1999–2014	B-759	Spirit of Clovelly	B-class (Atlantic 75)	Transferred to the relief fleet, later at Portishead.
2014–	B-872	Toby Rundle	B-class (Atlantic 85)	

=== Launch and recovery tractors ===
On station	Op.No.	Reg. No.	Type	Comments
1998–2000	T89	WEL 302S	Talus MBC Case 1150B	
2000–2003	T85	SEL 394R	Talus MBC Case 1150B	
2003–2011	T89	WEL 302S	Talus MBC Case 1150B	
2011–2019	T86	SEL 395R	Talus MBC Case 1150B	
2019–2020	T92	A462 AUX	Talus MB-H Crawler	
2020–2024	T98	C168 NAW	Talus MB-H Crawler	
2024–	T94	B567 FAW	Talus MB-H Crawler	

== See also ==
- List of RNLI stations
- List of former RNLI stations
- Royal National Lifeboat Institution lifeboats
- Talus Atlantic 85 DO-DO launch carriage
