= Hythe Lifeboat Station =

Former RNLI lifeboat station in Kent, England

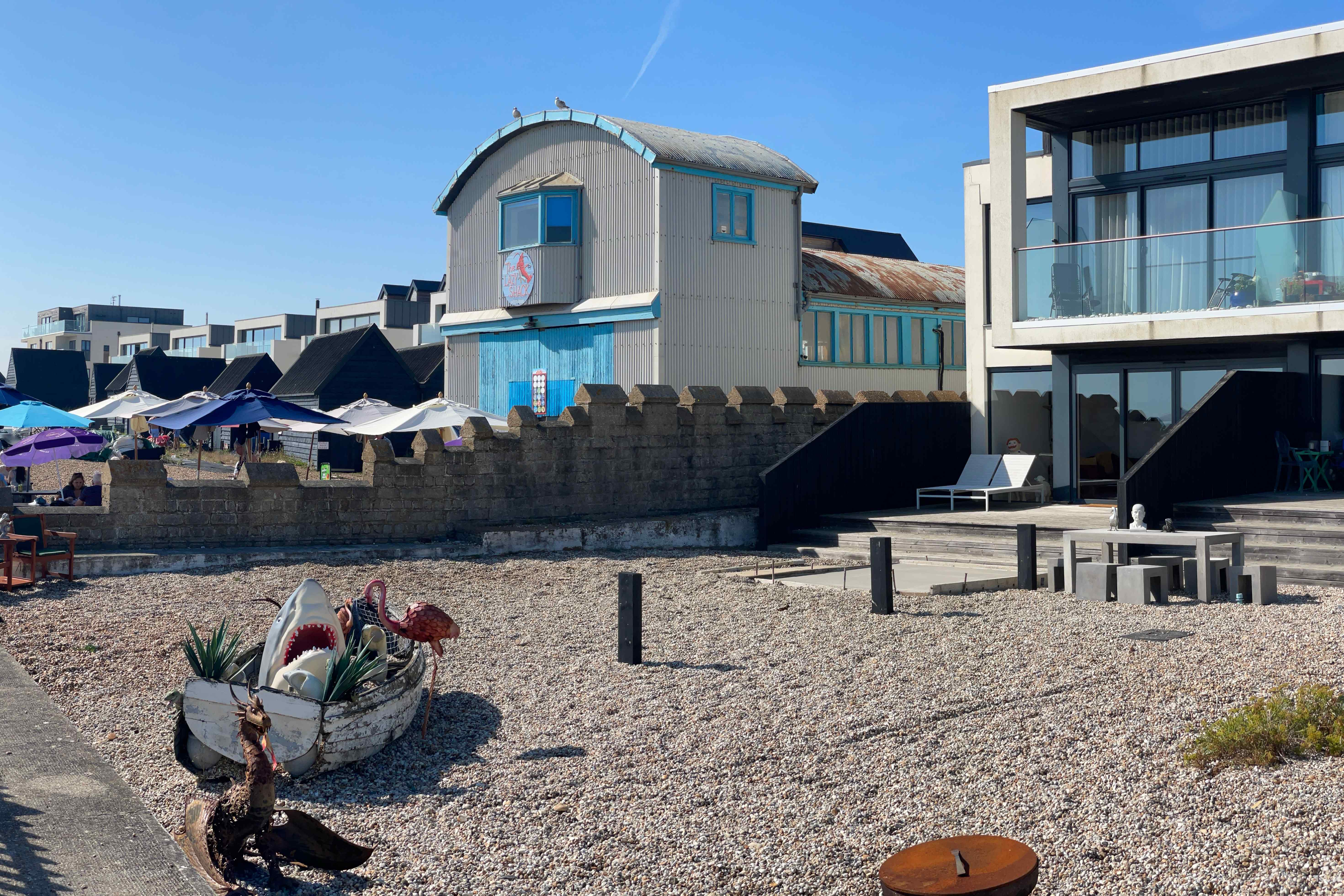
- Hythe 1936 Lifeboat Station

- Location within Kent

General information
- Status: Closed
- Type: RNLI Lifeboat Station
- Location: The Fishermans Landing Beach, Range Rd, Hythe, Kent, CT21 6HG, England
- Coordinates: 51°03′52.3″N 1°04′41.3″E
- Opened: 11 December 1893
- Closed: 1940

Hythe Lifeboat Station was located at the eastern end of West Parade, in the market town of Hythe, which is situated 7 miles (11 km) west of Folkestone, on the Kent coast.

A lifeboat station was first established at Hythe in 1893 by the Royal National Lifeboat Institution (RNLI), following the closure of the Hythe, Sandgate & Folkestone station at Seabrook.

Hythe lifeboat station was closed in 1940, after the lifeboat was lost during the Dunkirk evacuation.

== History ==
By 1893, difficulties were being encountered when launching the boat at Seabrook, due to coastal erosion, and sometimes in particularly poor conditions. Following the delays launching to the Benvenue in 1891, it was decided to close the Hythe, Sandgate & Folkestone station, and open two new stations, one at Folkestone, and one at Hythe, with the lifeboat Mayer de Rothschild (ON 35) being transferred to the station at Hythe.

A site was obtained from the 'Hythe & Sandgate Gas Company', and a boathouse was constructed by J. Scott, at a cost of £570-3s-6d. The boat, a 37-foot 4in self-righting 'Pulling and Sailing' (P&S) lifeboat, one with sails and (12) oars, built by Woolfe of Shadwell, costing £340, was moved to the new station on 11 December 1893. The boat had been funded from the gift of Miss Hannah de Rothschild, in memory of her late father Baron Mayer Amschel de Rothschild (29 June 1818 – 6 February 1874).

One of the first calls on the lifeboat, was on the evening of 25 July 1894, when gunfire was heard, usually an indication of a vessel in distress. Both the Hythe and New Romney lifeboats were launched, only to discover French naval vessels on exercise in the English Channel.

Mayer de Rothschild (ON 35) was replaced in 1910. In her 26-years of service at both stations, she was launched 20 times, and had saved 27 lives. She was replaced with a 35-foot lifeboat, built by Thames Ironworks, costing £913. It would again be named Mayer de Rothschild (ON 610).

On 14 April 1910, the Hythe lifeboat would save 3 fishermen from the fishing smack Providence of Folkestone. Two men were rescued from the barge Amy of London on 23 November 1911.

On 1 April 1917, the Hythe lifeboat was called to the ketch Mazeppa of Harwich, dragging her anchor in deteriorating conditions. With huge waves crashing over the vessel, one of the crew jumped in the water, and was picked up by the lifeboat. Coxswain James Dearman then dropped anchor, and veering down to the vessel, managed to get a line to the second man aboard, who then also jumped into the sea, and was pulled aboard the lifeboat. For outstanding seamanship and courage, Dearman was awarded the RNLI Bronze Medal. Wright Griggs, retired Second Coxswain, who had stepped up to the job when the regular man refused to put to sea, was also awarded the bronze medal.

On the evening of 11 November 1929, in the middle of one of the worst storms in years, it was reported to Douglas Oiller, coxswain of Dungeness lifeboat, that a barge had broken her moorings, and was in difficulties. The message was passed on to Henry Griggs, coxswain at Hythe, to keep a look-out. The Dungeness No.2 lifeboat was launched, but after several hours searching, nothing was found. Flares were then spotted off Hythe, and with some difficulty, the Hythe lifeboat was launched into the storm. With great seamanship, the lifeboat was brought alongside the barge, the Marie May of Rochester, Kent, and the three crewmen were rescued, landing them at 6:45am. The outcome unknown to Dungeness, they set out again at daybreak, spotted the barge, and again with great seamanship, brought their lifeboat alongside, only to find the vessel abandoned. For their efforts, Coxswain Griggs was awarded the RNLI Silver Medal, with the rest of the crew receiving "The Thanks of the Institution inscribed on Vellum". For his attempted rescue, Coxswain Oiller was awarded the RNLI Bronze Medal.

A motor-powered lifeboat would be placed at Hythe in 1930. A 35-foot 6in self-righting (motor) lifeboat, built by S. E. Saunders of Cowes, and costing £4,596, had been originally intended for Folkestone. It would be the first motor-powered lifeboat placed at Hythe, and was capable of 7.25 knots. It was named City of Nottingham (ON 726) by the city's Lord Mayor, after the money for the boat had been raised there in a special fund.

In the early 1930s, radio communication was in its infancy. At the end of 1933, the City of Nottingham was fitted with its first "wireless set", and the benefit of better communication was quickly proven. Launching on 22 February 1934 into calm seas but dense fog, the lifeboat set off in the expected direction of the casualty vessel, only to find nothing. A more accurate position of the vessel was then radioed to the lifeboat, and they quickly found the vessel 2 miles off Folkestone. The Grit of London had been badly damaged after a collision with another vessel in the fog. The six crew were rescued.

A new larger lifeboat was announced for Hythe in 1934, and to house the boat, construction of a new corrugated-iron boathouse was started in 1935, located directly in front of the 1893 boathouse. The boathouse was completed in 1936, and the new boat, a 41-foot Beach Type arrived on 28 February 1936. Both the lifeboat (£6,084) and the boat house (£3585) were funded by the Viscount of Wakefield, vice-president of Hythe Lifeboat Station, but better known for founding the Wakefield Motor Oil company (Castrol). At a ceremony on 24 July 1936, the boat was named The Viscountess Wakefield (ON 783).

Coxswain Henry Griggs would earn "The Thanks of the Institution inscribed on Vellum" in 1936. Alerted to distress rockets, the Folkestone fishing boat Florence Rosalind immediately put out, managing to get a tow line to the Josephine II, and saved her from going ashore. The line parted just as the lifeboat arrived, so a line was passed from the lifeboat, but that twice snapped. The three crewmen were then taken off, before the boat was wrecked on the shore. Awards were also made to the crew of the Florence Rosalind.

In 1940, the RNLI received communication, to muster as many lifeboats at possible at Dover within 24 hours, for the Dunkirk evacuation. On arrival at Dover, Coxswain Henry Griggs was instructed that the lifeboat was to be run up the beach in Dunkirk, loaded with as many men as possible, and then return to Dover. Knowing that this request of a 14½ ton lifeboat was impossible, he then asked what pensions would be provided to the dependents of any lifeboat men killed, and to be noted in writing. This was refused. Harry Griggs then refused to go, as did his crew, and the coxswains of the Walmer and Dungeness lifeboats. All the lifeboats were taken over by the Navy, the lifeboatmen given travel warrants and sent home.

At an RNLI Board of Enquiry at Hythe, it was found that Coxswain Henry Griggs, holder of the RNLI Silver medal, with 21 years experience, had influenced his own crew, and those from Walmer and Dungeness, to refuse to take their lifeboats to Dunkirk. Along with Richard Griggs, Motor Mechanic, he was dismissed from the RNLI.

Nineteen lifeboats were used for the Dunkirk Evacuation. Only one boat never returned, the Hythe lifeboat The Viscountess Wakefield (ON 783). Three weeks after the evacuation, she was reported to have been beached at De Panne, but could not get off, and had been abandoned.

The Hythe lifeboat was never replaced, and the Hythe Lifeboat Station closed in 1940.

Both boathouses still remain today. The Viscountess Wakefield (ON 783) was lost at Dunkirk, but the previous lifeboat, City of Nottingham (ON 726), which had gone on to serve at Clovelly until 1949, has been fully restored, and is currently in private ownership (2024).

== Station honours ==
The following are awards made at Hythe.

- RNLI Silver Medal

Henry Albert Griggs, Jnr., Coxswain – 1929

- RNLI Bronze Medal

James Dearman, Coxswain – 1917
Wright Griggs, Acting Second Coxswain – 1917

- The Thanks of the Institution inscribed on Vellum

Alban White, Second Coxswain – 1929
Arthur E. Wheeler, Bowman – 1929
Wright Griggs, Jnr. – 1929
Mark T. Cloake – 1929
William R. Cheal – 1929
William B. Slingsby – 1929
Alfred Wanfor – 1929
Mark Godden – 1929
Stephen Middleton – 1929
George Wire – 1929
Albert E. Griggs – 1929

Henry Albert Griggs, Jnr, Coxswain – 1936

== Hythe lifeboats ==
=== Pulling and Sailing (P&S) lifeboats ===
ON (Note: ON is the RNLI's Official Number of the boat.)	Name	Built	On station	Class	Comments
35	Mayer de Rothschild	1884	1893–1910	37-foot Self-righting (P&S)	(Note: 37-foot x 8-foot (12-oared) self-righting (P&S) lifeboat, gift of Miss Hannah de Rothschild of London, built by Woolfe of Shadwell, London, costing £340 when new.); Previously at Hythe, Sandgate & Folkestone
610	Mayer de Rothschild	1910	1910–1930	35-foot Self-righting (P&S)	(Note: 35-foot x 8-foot 6in (10-oared) self-righting (P&S) lifeboat, gift of Miss Hannah de Rothschild of London, built by Thames Ironworks, of Blackwall, London, costing £913.)

=== All-weather lifeboats ===
ON	Name	Built	On station	Class	Comments
726	City of Nottingham	1929	1930–1936	35-foot 6in Self-righting (motor)	(Note: 35-foot 6in self-righting (motor) lifeboat, built by S. E. Saunders of Cowes, with a single 35-hp 'Weyburn' AE6 petrol-engine, delivering 7.25 knots, costing £4,596.)
783	The Viscountess Wakefield	1936	1936–1940	41-foot Beach Type	(Note: 41-foot Watson-class non-self-righting lifeboat, built by Groves and Guttridge of Cowes, with twin 35-hp 'Weyburn' AE6 petrol-engines, delivering 7.75 knots, costing £6,084.); Lost at Dunkirk.

== See also ==
- List of RNLI stations
- List of former RNLI stations
- Royal National Lifeboat Institution lifeboats
