= 41ft Beach Type Motor Lifeboat =

Former RNLI lifeboat class

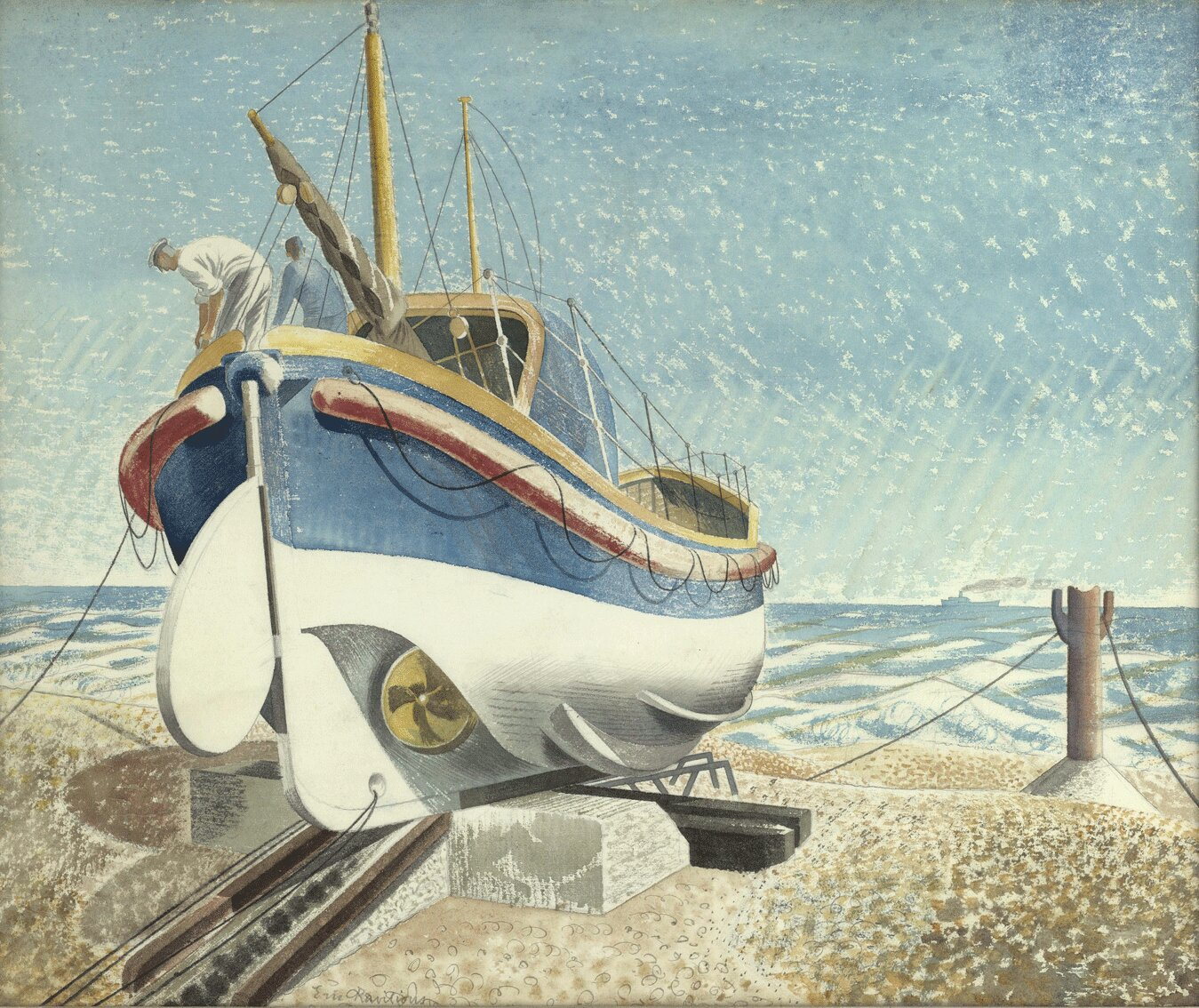
- The Lifeboat by Eric Ravilious.

Class overview
- Name: 41ft Beach Type Motor Lifeboat
- Builders: Groves & Guttridge, Cowes; Sussex Yacht Co., Shoreham; J. Samuel White, Cowes
- Operators: Royal National Lifeboat Institution
- Preceded by: Various
- Succeeded by: Various
- Cost: £5,600-£15,011
- Built: 1931-1949
- In service: 1931-1979
- Completed: 5
- Lost: 1
- Retired: 4

General characteristics
- Class & type: 41ft Beach Type Motor Lifeboat
- Displacement: 14-15 tons
- Length: 41 ft (12 m)
- Beam: 12 ft 3 in (3.73 m)
- Draught: 3 ft 3 in (0.99 m)
- Propulsion: (As built) 2x35bhp Weyburn AE6 6-cylinder petrol
- Speed: 7 1/2 knots
- Crew: 8-10

The 41ft Beach Type Motor Lifeboat was a non self-righting displacement hull lifeboat built between 1931 and 1949 and operated by the Royal National Lifeboat Institution between 1931 and 1979.

== History ==
The 41ft Beach type was designed for stations that required the lifeboat to be launched across a beach, where the Barnett and Watson cabin types were considered too large and the 35'6" types too lightweight. They were developed from the Norfolk and Suffolk type, and were designed by the RNLI's consulting naval architect, James Rennie Barnett.

The type is sometimes referred to as the 'Aldeburgh type' after the first station to receive one.

Production ran from 1931 to 1936 and four boats were completed. In 1949 a revised version was built for service at Eastbourne. The later 41ft Watson type had a similar design to the Beach type and often the Beaches are confused for the similar sized Watson.

The four boats of this type built in the 1930s were sent to Dunkirk to take part in the Dunkirk Evacuation. The Viscountess Wakefield was the only boat, not only of this class, but of those sent by the RNLI, to be lost in the evacuation.

== Description ==
The Beach type refers to five boats with similar characteristics, but as they were designed for the conditions faced by each stations there were significant variations between boats. All boats shared an aft cockpit with a watertight engine room ahead under a shelter. The boats built in the 1930s carried sails as an auxiliary to the twin 35-hp Weyburn AE6 6-cylinder petrol engines.

The first boat of the class, Abdy Beauclerk (ON 751), had large bulwarks at the fore end. The next two, Charles Cooper Henderson (ON 761) and Charles Dibdin, (Civil Service No.2) (ON 762), had low endboxes fore and aft. These three boats had large masts to carry lug sails.

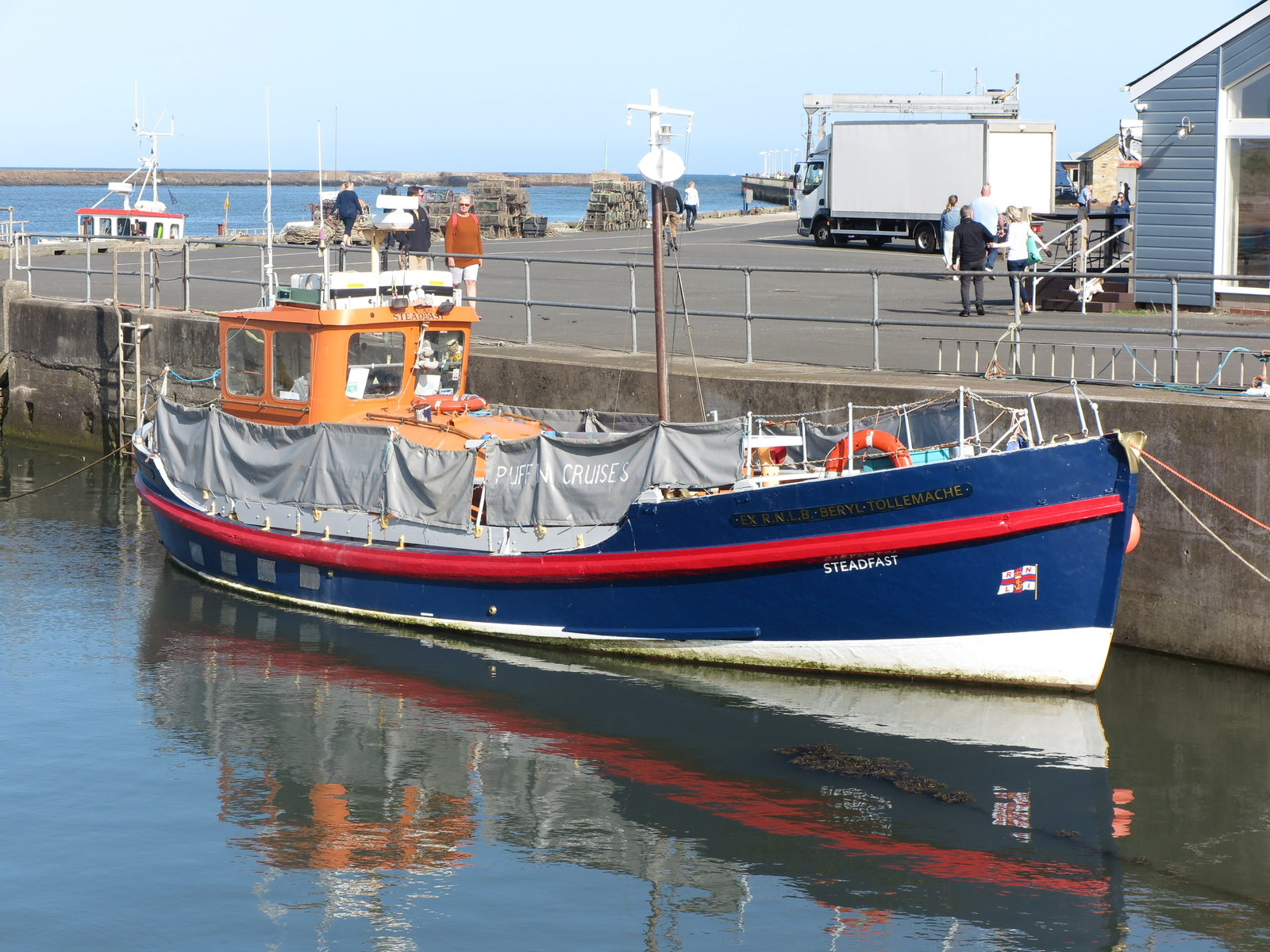
Ex-RNLB Beryl Tollemache (ON 859), with added wheelhouse, at Warkworth Harbour, 2020

The last of the pre-war boats, The Viscountess Wakefield (ON 783), had bulwarks both fore and aft and only had a mizzen mast to carry a steadying sail. All four had a wooden shelter covering the engine room and the forward end of the cockpit.

The type was put back into production in 1949 for one more lifeboat, thirteen years after the last had been built. The Beryl Tollemache (ON 859) was a revised version, with a cabin in the forward end of the boat and an aluminium alloy shelter instead of wood.

In 1963, two of the boats were re-engined with 47-bhp Ford-based Parsons Porbeagle 4-cylinder diesel engines.

The last lifeboat, Beryl Tollemache (ON 859), named in memory of the donor's daughter, was withdrawn from service at Eastbourne in 1977. During her 28 years on station, she had been launched 176 times, saving 154 lives.

== Fleet ==
ON (Note: ON is the RNLI's Official Number of the boat.)	Name	Built	Builder	In service	Stations	Re-engined	Comments
751	Abdy Beauclerk	1931	J. Samuel White	1931–1958	Aldeburgh	No	(Note: Legacy of Mrs King, built by J. Samuel White of Cowes, costing £6,384.) Sold 1959. Renamed St. Ita. Last reported with a wheelhouse added, Houseboat at Rusheen Bay, Galway, February 2010.
761	Charles Cooper Henderson	1933	Groves and Guttridge	1933–1957	Dungeness	1963	(Note: Legacy of Mr Henderson, built by Groves and Guttridge of Cowes, costing £5,705. Re-engined with twin 47-hp Parsons Porbeagle 4-cyl. diesel engines, 1963) Sold 1976. Renamed Elizabeth and Marie Spencer, later Caresana. Last seen as Charles Cooper Henderson at Henley festival, July 2024.
761	Charles Cooper Henderson	1933	Groves and Guttridge	1957–1974	Relief fleet	1963	Sold 1976. Renamed Elizabeth and Marie Spencer, later Caresana. Last seen as Charles Cooper Henderson at Henley festival, July 2024.
762	Charles Dibdin (Civil Service No.2)	1933	Groves and Guttridge	1933–1959	Walmer	No	(Note: Gift of the Civil Service LB fund, built by Groves and Guttridge of Cowes, costing £5,664.) Sold 1959. Renamed Channel Rover. Last reported as a Pilot boat at Western Docks, Dover, April 1980.
783	The Viscountess Wakefield	1936	Groves and Guttridge	1936–1940	Hythe	No	(Note: Gift of the Rt. Hon. The Lord Wakefield of Hythe, CBE, built by Groves and Guttridge of Cowes, costing £6,084.) Sold 1959. Lost at De Panne, during the Dunkirk evacuation, 31 May 1940
859	Beryl Tollemache	1949	Sussex Yacht Co.	1949–1977	Eastbourne	1963	(Note: Gift of Sir Lyonel and Lady Tollemache, built by Sussex Yacht Co. of Shoreham-by-Sea, costing £15,012. Re-engined with twin 47-hp Parsons Porbeagle 4-cyl. diesel engines, 1963.) Sold 1979. Renamed Boisil, later Steadfast. Used by Puffin Cruises, noted for sale in 2020, last reported at Bath, Somerset, August 2022.
859	Beryl Tollemache	1949	Sussex Yacht Co.	1977–1979	Relief fleet	1963	Sold 1979. Renamed Boisil, later Steadfast. Used by Puffin Cruises, noted for sale in 2020, last reported at Bath, Somerset, August 2022.

== See also ==
- Royal National Lifeboat Institution lifeboats
