= Eastbourne Lifeboat Station =

RNLI lifeboat station in East Sussex, England

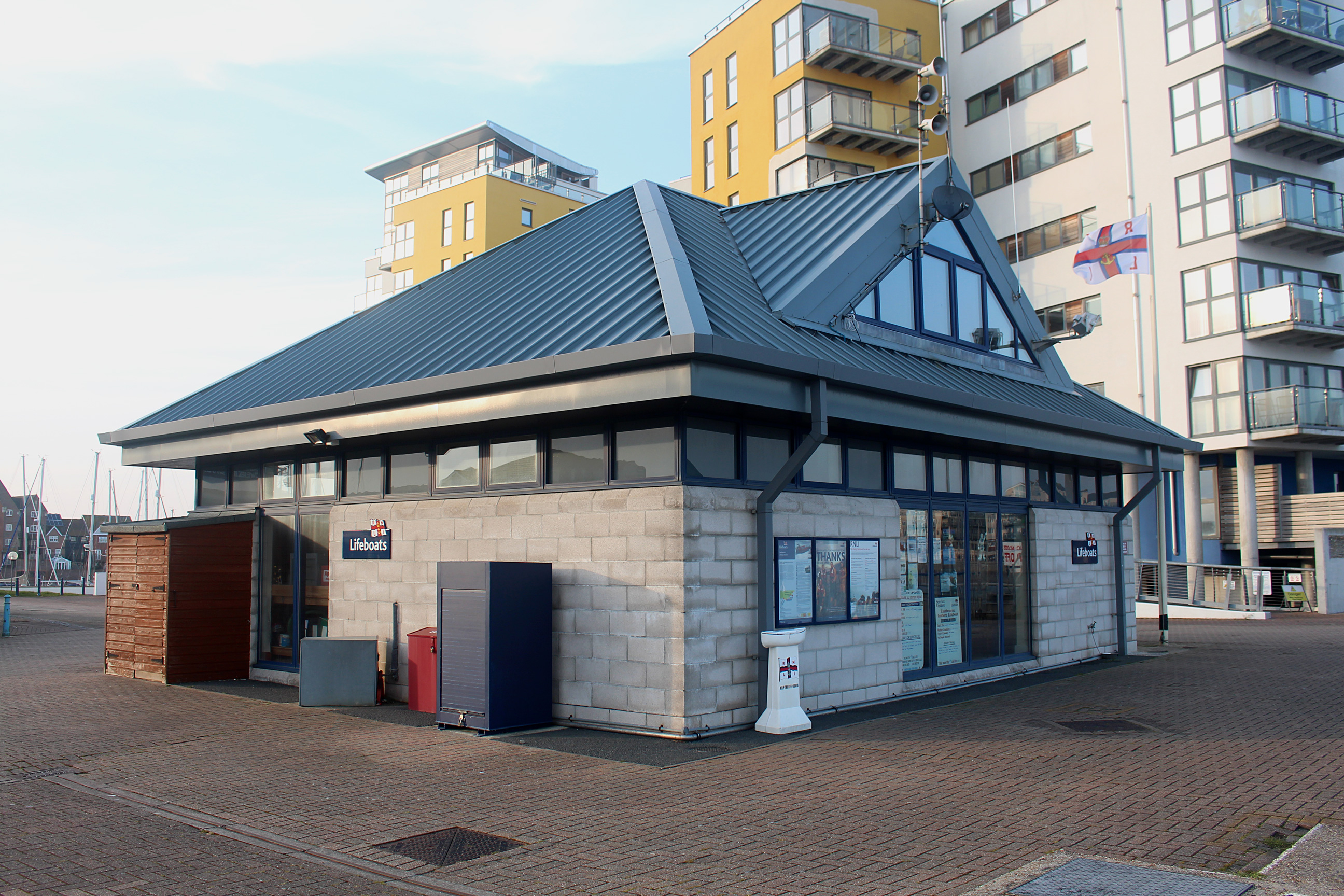
- Eastbourne Lifeboat Station at Sovereign Harbour, Eastbourne

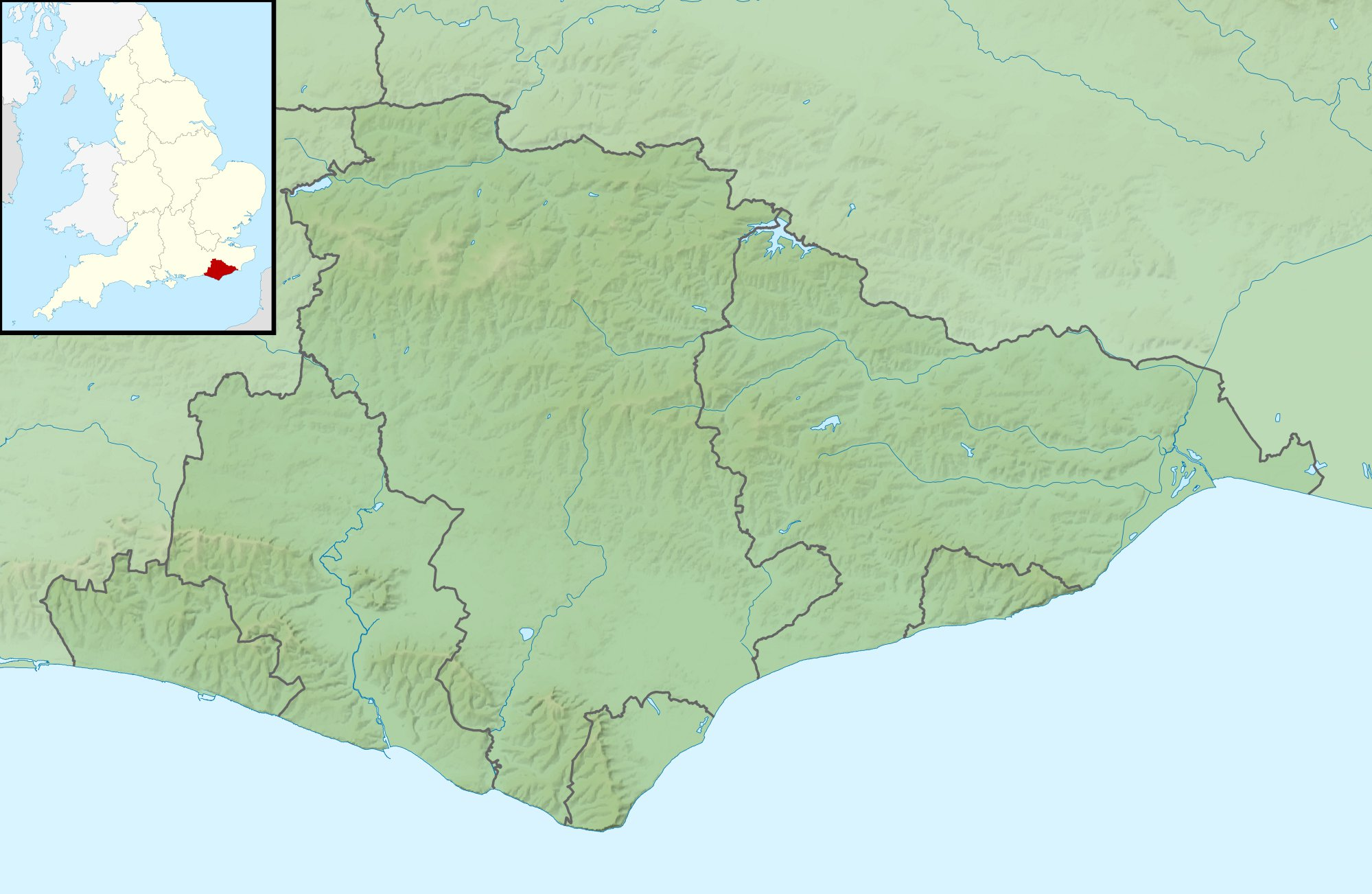
- Location within East Sussex

General information
- Type: RNLI Lifeboat Station
- Location: Sovereign Harbour Marina, Pevensey Bay Rd, Eastbourne, East Sussex, BN23 5BJ, England
- Coordinates: 50°47′28.1466″N 0°19′40.7172″E
- Opened: 1822
- Owner: Royal National Lifeboat Institution

Website
- Eastbourne RNLI Lifeboat Station

Eastbourne Lifeboat Station can be found at Sovereign Harbour Marina, off Pevensey Bay Rd, in Eastbourne, a seaside resort overlooking the English Channel, in the county of East Sussex, on the south coast of England. A satellite station, 1.6 miles (2.6 km) to the west, on The Oval, at Fisherman's Green, is home to the Inshore lifeboat.

A lifeboat station was established in Eastbourne in 1822. Management of the station was transferred to the Royal National Institution for the Preservation of Life from Shipwreck in 1853, which became the Royal National Lifeboat Institution (RNLI) the following year.

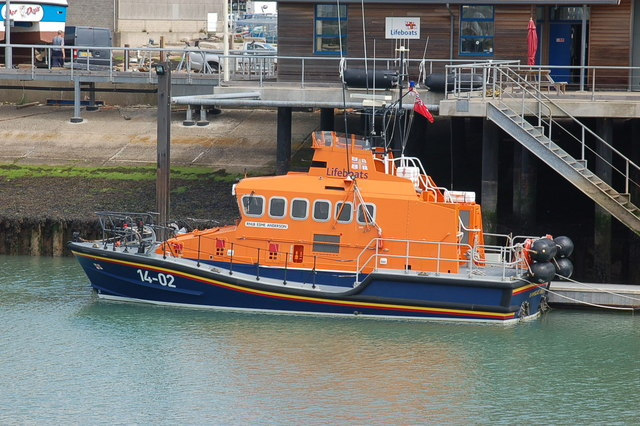
Trent-class lifeboat 14-02 Esme Anderson (ON 1197)

The station currently operates 14-02 Esme Anderson (ON 1197), a Trent-class All-weather lifeboat, on station since 2024, and a D-class (IB1) Inshore lifeboat, The David H (D-876), on station since 2023. A second D-class lifeboat, The Peter Dixon (D-909), on station since 2026, is operating on a 1-year trial basis from Sovereign Harbour.

An older lifeboat station, west of Eastbourne Pier, is now used as an RNLI museum.

== History ==
=== Establishment and early years ===
Samaritan or The Rose, the first Eastbourne lifeboat, built by John and William Simpson, was donated to the town in 1822 by the local Member of Parliament, John 'Mad Jack' Fuller, a noted philanthropist. He had witnessed how local fishermen had attempted to rescue the crew of the ship Thames, which had run aground in a storm off Eastbourne, and concluded that a purpose-built lifeboat was needed to improve the chance of successful rescues.

The fishermen used an area called the Stade, about 50 yards (46 m) east of the later site of Eastbourne Pier (built in 1870) to launch their boats. A wooden boathouse was built here to house the new lifeboat, which was 25 feet (7.6 m) long with a beam of 8 feet 6 inches (2.59 m) and 10 oars. In her 41 years of service from 1822 to 1863, she saw seven service launches and saved 55 lives. Her first sea trial took place in 1822, two years before the Royal National Lifeboat Institution (RNLI) was founded, but it was not until February 1833 that her first service launch took place, saving 29 people.

The lifeboatmen were local fishermen with great experience of the waters off Eastbourne and the physical fitness needed to row and sail a boat through heavy seas. The work was extremely dangerous, especially as most could not swim; it was not until 1854 that the RNLI introduced the first cork lifejackets. It became traditional for members of the same family to volunteer and for families to have a long association with the lifeboat. At one point in 1900, eight of the 17 men in the crew were from the same family. The family of the first coxswain of the Eastbourne Lifeboat, Edward Allchorn, remained involved for generations and one of Edward's descendants, Thomas Allchorn, was to serve as coxswain over 130 years later. The involvement of local fishermen has diminished greatly over the years as the fishing industry has shrunk, and only about 9% of RNLI crews now have a maritime background.

=== Later 19th century ===
The Samaritan was replaced in 1863 by Mary Stirling, gifted by J. Stirling Donald of Cheltenham. The new lifeboat was substantially larger at 35 feet (11 m) long with a beam of 8 feet 6 inches (2.59 m) and 10 oars, and was self-righting. She served from 1863 to 1880 and saw five service launches in which no lives were saved. A new boathouse was built on the Stade, alongside its predecessor, to house the Mary Stirling.

In 1867, a new brick boathouse was built inshore to replace the previous wooden boathouses. It still stands today on what is now Marine Road, while the site of the former boathouses is now occupied by the Parade. It remained in use until 1902 and was subsequently used for many years as an electricity substation.

A replacement lifeboat, William and Mary, was gifted in 1880 by the friends of the RNLI in Manchester. She had the same characteristics as her predecessor – self-righting, with a beam of 8 feet 6 inches (2.59 m) and 10 oars. Serving from 1880 to 1899, her 12 service launches resulted in the saving of 45 lives. One of her launches, on 25 November 1883, was one of the most notable achievements in the history of the Eastbourne Lifeboat. When news reached Eastbourne of a ship in trouble near Belle Tout Lighthouse, west of the town, the appalling weather conditions made it impossible to launch the lifeboat from Eastbourne beach. A team of seven horses was used to pull the boat on its carriage five miles overland to Birling Gap, with another three horses used to provide a boost on the steep hills in between. The Gap was too narrow to allow the lifeboat to pass through so it was offloaded onto skids while helpers cut away the banks to allow the boat to reach the beach. Launched into the teeth of a gale, the lifeboat was able to reach the stricken ship, the New Brunswick, after 45 minutes of rowing. The lifeboatmen were able to throw a line to the ship and evacuate the New Brunswick's eleven crewmembers. All managed to reach the shore successfully. In recognition of this feat, the lifeboatmen were awarded a special medal for the rescue of the New Brunswick.

A new boathouse was built in 1898 following the murder of the actor William Terriss in London the previous December. The Daily Telegraph launched a memorial appeal which enabled the William Terriss Memorial Boathouse to be constructed.

=== 20th century ===
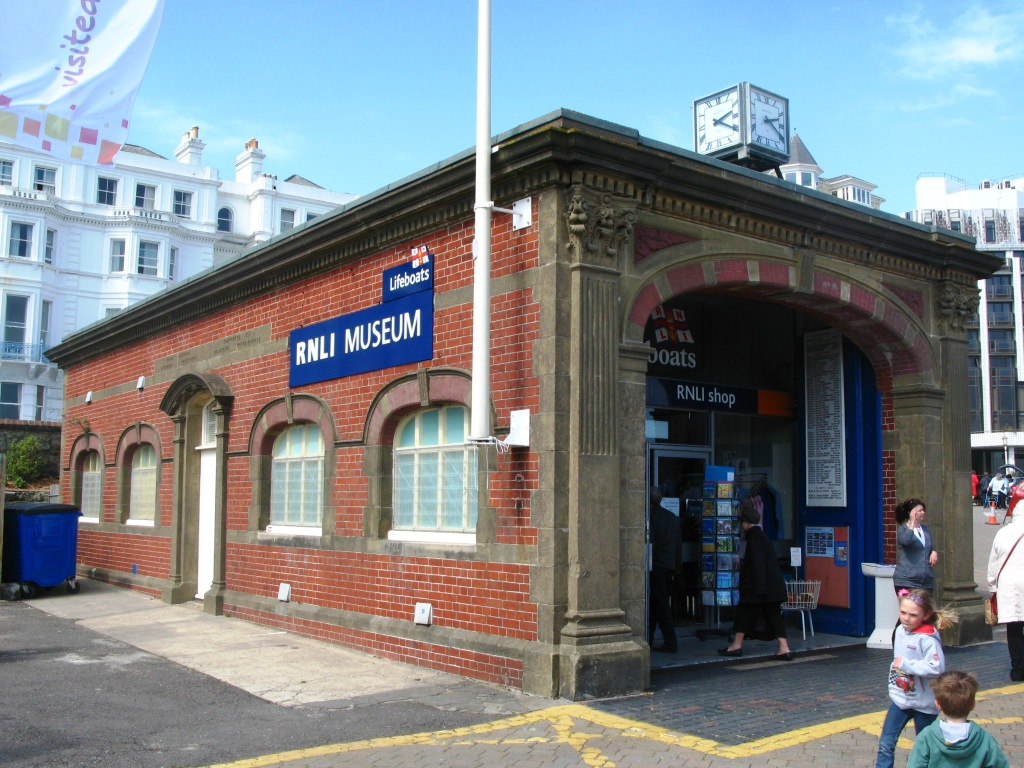
The William Terriss Memorial Boathouse in Eastbourne, now the Eastbourne RNLI Museum

William and Mary's successor James Stevens No. 6, introduced in 1899, was one of 20 lifeboats financed by the will of James Stevens of Birmingham. She was also self-righting, with a beam of 8 feet 6 inches (2.59 m) and 10 oars. 34 lives were saved by this boat in 43 service launches between 1899 and 1924.

Soon after the opening of the William Terriss Memorial Boathouse, it became apparent that the beach profile at that location caused problems when launching the lifeboat during storms. An additional lifeboat station was built at Fishermans Green further east along the beach. This became the new No. 1 Eastbourne lifeboat station, housing Olive, a Liverpool-class non-self-righting boat that was 36 feet (11 m) long with a beam of 9 feet (2.7 m). The boat was donated through the legacy of the Misses Wingate of Edinburgh and had five service launches between 1903 and 1921 in which no lives were saved. The oldest of the three boathouses, at Marine Road, was closed and the James Stevens No. 6 remained in the William Terriss Memorial Boathouse, which was now designated as No. 2 Eastbourne lifeboat station.

Eastbourne's first motor lifeboat, the Priscilla MacBean arrived in 1921 as a bequest from E. MacBean of Helensburgh. She was a self-righting boat 35 feet (11 m) long with a beam of 8 feet 6 inches (2.59 m). Serving until 1927, she saw 11 service launches in which six lives were saved.

The William Terriss Memorial Boathouse was closed as an operational boathouse in 1924 and was used to display the newly retired James Stevens No. 6 as a "display lifeboat". The lifeboat was sold in 1936, though the oars are still on display in the boathouse, which became the RNLI's first museum.

Another self-righting boat, LP and St. Helen, was bequeathed by the legacies of A. Lovelock, A. Pett and H. Turner. With a length of 35 feet (11 m) and a beam of 8 feet 6 inches (2.59 m), she served from 1927 to 1929 with two service launches and no lives saved.

Jane Holland, a motor lifeboat bequeathed through the legacy of W. Clarke of London, served from 1929 to 1949 and saw more launches – a total of 55 – than any of her predecessors, saving 65 lives. The lifeboat, a 48 feet (15 m) self-righting vessel with a beam of 10 feet 6 inches (3.20 m), was launched 22 times and saved 42 lives during the Second World War. In 1940, lifeboatmen Thomas Allchorn and Alec Huggett were awarded RNLI bronze medals for their roles in the rescue of the crew of the steamer Barnhill. The ship was struck by German bombs and set on fire while about six miles off Beachy Head. Although 28 of the crew had been taken off by the lifeboat, Allchorn and Huggett went back on board the burning vessel to rescue her master.

=== Post-war years ===
The Beryl Tollemache was Eastbourne's first lifeboat to be equipped with a protective cabin and a radio. Gifted in 1949 by Sir Lyonel and Lady Tollemache of Richmond, the 41-foot (12.5 m) beach-launched Watson-class boat was launched 176 times and saved 154 lives. One of her most notable rescues involved the SS Germania, a 3,000-ton vessel which collided with another ship and ran aground on 26 April 1955. The lifeboat rescued 26 crewmembers just as the ship broke in two and took them ashore. On 6 May, the salvage boats Moonbeam and Endeavour got into trouble in severe weather around the wrecked Germania. The Beryl Tollemache towed Endeavour to safety, turned around and returned to the stricken Moonbeam. However, the towline broke four times in the rough seas and the lifeboat's propeller was damaged by driftwood. The lifeboatmen nonetheless managed to get the Moonbeam back to Eastbourne Pier. Soon afterwards, they received reports that salvage men left aboard the wreck of the Germania were sending up distress flares. The Beryl Tollemache set off yet again at 9.30 pm, by which time the waves were so large that they were breaking right over the Germania's mast tops. Despite the great danger, Thomas Allchorn's skilful handling of the lifeboat enabled all 16 men aboard the wreck to be taken off safely. He was later awarded the RNLI Bronze Second-Service Clasp and the Maud Smith Award for that year's bravest act of lifesaving.

Another notable rescue performed by the Beryl Tollemache was that of the crew of the Norwegian tanker Sitakund which exploded in the English Channel on 20 October 1968. The lifeboat and other vessels successfully evacuated 31 survivors from the tanker before returning the next day with a complement of firefighters to tackle the burning vessel. The Beryl Tollemache remained in front-line service until May 1977, when she was reassigned to the RNLI's relief fleet. The lifeboat is still in use today for tours to Coquet Island off Amble in Northumberland.

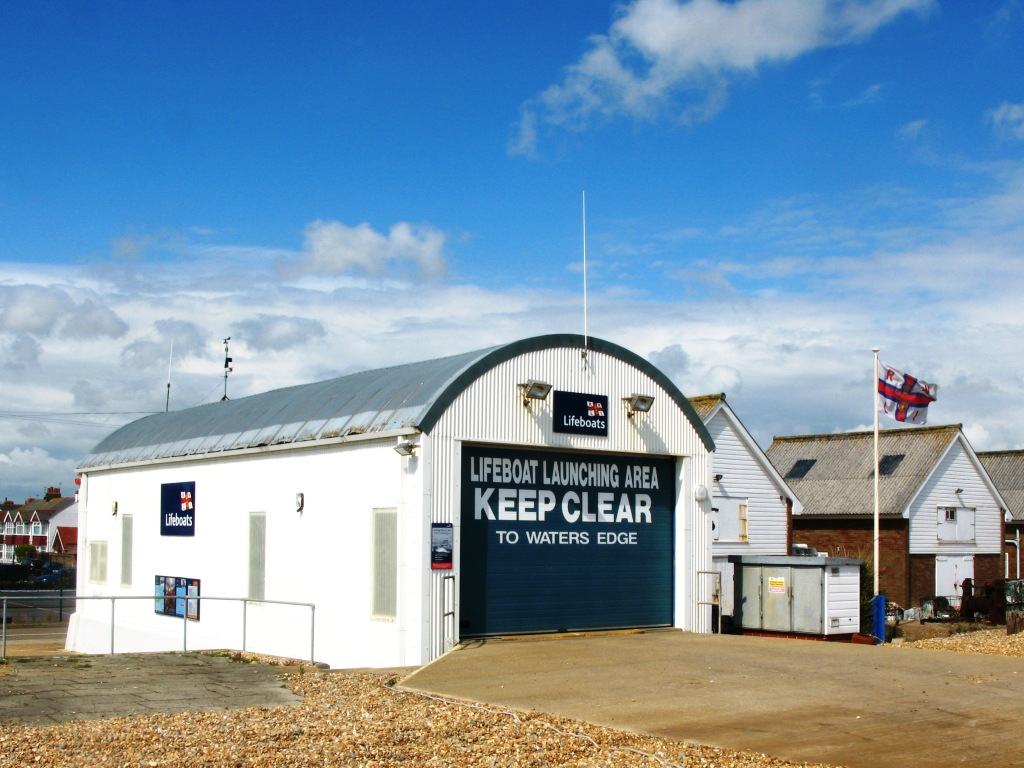
The Eastbourne Inshore Lifeboat Station, from where D-class inflatable inshore lifeboats are launched

An early version of the RNLI D-class inflatable inshore lifeboat was introduced in 1964. The fast and manoeuvrable inflatables allowed rescues to be carried out closer to the shore and in shallow waters. The boats served from 1964 to 2003 with financing from various donors. They were launched 739 times and saved 265 lives. Their successors were the Joan and Ted Wiseman 50, which served from August 2003 to September 2011, and the Laurence and Percy Hobbs, which has served from September 2011 to date. The inshore lifeboats are housed in the Fishermans Green lifeboat station.

One notable rescue carried out by the inshore lifeboat was that of a man found clinging to a ledge on Eastbourne Pier at midnight on 7 April 1997. The lifeboat was called out but was thrown against the pier by the waves, suffering severe damage, and began to deflate. Three people on the pier trying to help the man also got into difficulties. Lifeboatman Ian Stringer managed to hold the boat in place long enough for all four people to be rescued and taken safely back to the shore. He was awarded an RNLI Silver Medal for Gallantry for his work.

Larger lifeboats continued to be used as well, and in 1977 another Beach Watson-class lifeboat, the Charles Dibdin, was introduced into service at Eastbourne. She was funded by the Civil Service Lifeboat Fund and was the 32nd such lifeboat funded. She served from 1977 to 1979, was launched 11 times and saved 13 lives.

The Eastbourne Lifeboat Appeal funded the introduction in 1979 of the Duke of Kent, a 37 feet 6 inches (11.43 m) Rother-class self-righting lifeboat named after (and by) the eponymous duke and president of the RNLI. The boat was equipped with up-to-date technology including radar and an echo sounder. In her 14 years of service between 1979 and 1993, she was launched 353 times, saving 86 lives. She was kept busy by a rapid growth in the popularity of leisure sailing and watersports, but some more unusual challenges also presented themselves. Filming for the James Bond film The Living Daylights took place off Beachy Head at the end of 1986 but nearly ended in tragedy when a motorboat carrying three film crew capsized. The inshore lifeboat was launched into waves that were up to 8 feet (2.4 m) high but the film crew initially refused to be evacuated. It was only when their boat began to be smashed against rocks that they decided to leave. The lifeboat's coxswain, Ian Stringer, was awarded the RNLI's Bronze Medal for his role in the rescue.

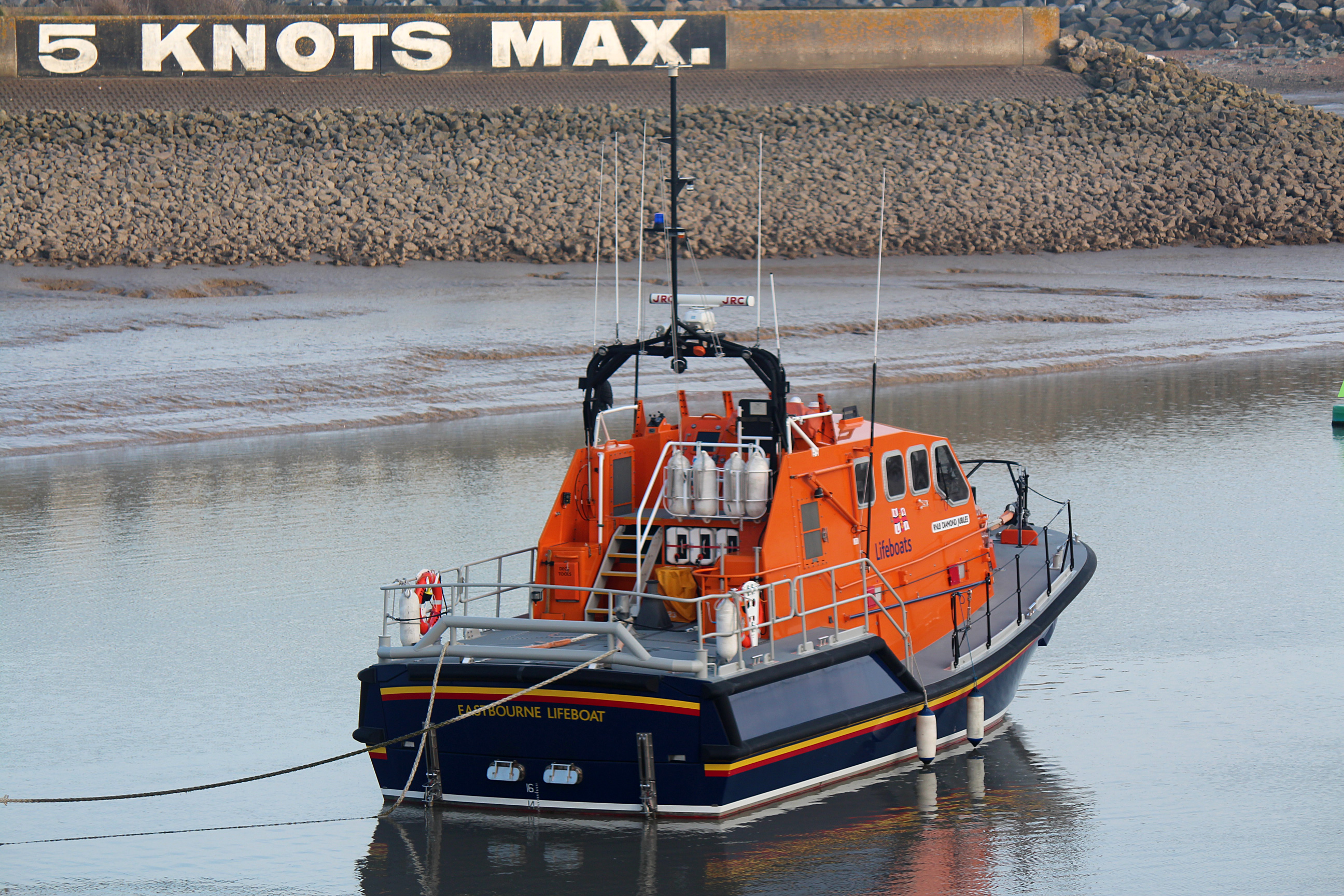
The Diamond Jubilee at anchor in Sovereign Harbour in 2014

The Duke of Kent was replaced in 1993 by the Royal Thames, funded by an appeal by the Royal Thames Yacht Club and an anonymous donation. The 12 metres (39 ft) Mersey-class self-righting lifeboat served until 2012. She was supported by the relief lifeboat Fisherman's Friend, which made a notable rescue of the stricken yacht Paperchase on 20 October 2002.

The Paperchase got into trouble in a Force 8 gale which left her crew, a married couple, clinging to the mast. The lifeboat faced waves of up to 10 feet (3.0 m) high and had less than 3 feet (0.91 m) of water under her keel, but managed to reach the yacht just as it capsized. Lifeboat Mechanic Dan Guy enabled the woman to be pulled into the lifeboat but was himself swept into the sea as he tried to rescue her unconscious husband. The two spent 20 minutes in the water before being rescued; both survived. Mark Sawyer, the coxswain, was awarded the RNLI's Silver Medal while Guy received the Bronze Medal and the crew were given Medal Service Certificates.

Since 1993, the all-weather lifeboat has been moored afloat in a new lifeboat station in the Sovereign Harbour development. In 2012, Mersey-class lifeboat Royal Thames was replaced by a new All-weather lifeboat, 16-23 Diamond Jubilee (ON 1303), a 16 metres (52 ft) self-righting Tamar-class lifeboat.

For operational reasons, it was decided in April 2023 to swap Eastbourne's larger Tamar-class with Ramsgate's smaller Trent-class 14-02 Esme Anderson (ON 1197). Diamond Jubilee commenced service at Ramsgate in Nov 2023.

Trent-class 14-15 Henry Heys Duckworth (ON 1213) from the relief fleet was on service at Eastbourne until the arrival of Esme Anderson on 10 February 2024.

Due to the logistical difficulties of operating two lifeboat stations at different locations, one for the ALB, and the other for the ILB, an additional D-class (IB1) Inshore lifeboat was placed at Sovereign Harbour in 2026, for a 1-year trial period.

== Station honours ==
The following are awards made at Eastbourne:

- RNIPLS Gold Medal
  Lt. Joseph Clarke, RN, Coast Blockade, Birling – 1824
- RNIPLS Silver Medal
  Lt. Horatio Blair RN, H.M. Coastguard, Birling Gap – 1840
  Lt. Thomas Andrew Gilson RN, H.M. Coastguard, Holywell – 1843
- RNLI Silver Medal
  Ian Stringer, Helm – 1997
  Mark Sawyer, Coxswain – 2003
- Silver Medal and diploma in English
  awarded by The South Holland Society for Saving the Shipwrecked
  Each member of the crew – 1845
- RNLI Bronze Medal
  Thomas Allchorn, crew member – 1940
  Alec Huggett, crew member – 1940
  Thomas Allchorn, Coxswain – 1955 (Second-Service clasp)
  Ian Stringer, Helm – 1987
  Dan Guy, Mechanic – 2003
- The Maud Smith Award 1955
  for the bravest act of lifesaving during the year by a member of a lifeboat crew
  Thomas Allchorn, Coxswain – 1955
- Award from the James Michael Bower Endowment Fund
  as the only recipient of an RNLI Silver Medal for Gallantry during 2003
  Mark Sawyer, Coxswain – 2003
- The Emile Robins Award for 2002/3
  awarded by The Shipwrecked Fishermen and Mariners' Royal Benevolent Society to the Master/Coxswain of a British vessel who incurs the greatest peril in rescuing survivors at sea
  Mark Sawyer, Coxswain – 2003
- The Thanks of the Institution inscribed on Vellum
  J. Bassett, Coxswain – 1966
  John D. Cooper, crew member – 1983
  Derek P. Tucker, crew member – 1987
  Gary Mead, crew member – 1997
  Tom Hobdel, crew member – 1997
- A Framed Letter of Thanks signed by the Chairman of the Institution
  Paul Metcalfe, Helm – 1983
  Ian Stringer, crew member – 1983
  Graham Cole, Coxswain/Mechanic – 1990
  Mark Chessell, crew member – 1997
  Dawn Mead, crew member – 1997
  Stuart McNab, Auxiliary Coastguard – 1997
- Member, Order of the British Empire (MBE)
  Stuart Joseph McNab – 2014QBH
  Paul Stewart Metcalfe, former Lifeboat Operations Manager – 2017QBH

== Roll of honour ==
In memory of those lost whilst serving Eastbourne lifeboat:

- Died in 1926 of epilepsy, following exposure and injuries received on service to the Comptesse Flandre, 30 December 1925.
  Harry H. Hendy, Bowman (43)

== Eastbourne lifeboats ==
=== Eastbourne / Eastbourne No.1 ===
ON (Note: ON is the RNLI's Official Number of the boat.)	Name	Built	On station	Class	Comments
Pre-080	Unnamed	1822	1822–1833	25-foot Non-self-righting	(Note: 25-foot x 8-foot 6in (10-oared) non-self-righting lifeboat, built by Simpson of Eastbourne, costing £210.); Renamed John Fuller in 1833.
Pre-080	John Fuller	1822	1833–1863	25-foot Non-self-righting	Renamed John Fuller in 1833.
Pre-405	Mary Stirling	1863	1863–1880	33-foot Peake Self-Righting (P&S)	(Note: 33-foot x 8-foot (10-oared) Peake-class self-righting (P&S) lifeboat, gift of Mr J. Stirling-Donald of Cheltenham, built by Forrest of Limehouse, London, costing £265.)
186	William and Mary	1879	1880–1899	34-foot Self-Righting (P&S)	(Note: 34-foot x 8-foot 3in (10-oared) self-righting (P&S) lifeboat, gift of 'friends' at Manchester, built by Woolfe of Shadwell, London, costing £363.); Sold in 1899.
427	James Stevens No.6	1899	1899–1924	35-foot Self-Righting (P&S)	(Note: 35-foot x 8-foot 6in (10-oared) self-righting (P&S) lifeboat, legacy of Mr J. Stevens of Birmingham, built by Thames Ironworks of Blackwall, London, costing £612.); Retained at Eastbourne for demonstration purposes, Sold in 1936. Renamed Golden City, broken up after 1947.

Pre ON numbers are unofficial numbers used by the Lifeboat Enthusiasts' Society to reference early lifeboats not included on the official RNLI list.

=== Eastbourne No.2 ===
ON	Name	Built	On station	Class	Comments
511	Olive	1903	1903–1921	36-foot Liverpool (P&S)	(Note: 36-foot x 9-foot (12-oared) Liverpool-class non-self-righting (P&S) lifeboat, legacy of Misses Wingate of Edinburgh, built by Thames Ironworks of Blackwall, London, costing £839.); Sold in 1922. Renamed Ocean King, but believed broken up in the 1950s.
611	Jane Hannah MacDonald	1910	1929–1930	35-foot Self-Righting (P&S)	(Note: 36-foot x 8-foot 6in (10-oared) self-righting (P&S) lifeboat, gift of Mrs MacDonald of Brighton, built by Thames Ironworks of Blackwall, London, costing £931 when new.); Previously at Appledore. Sold in 1939. Stored for restoration at Bideford, July 2024,

=== Motor lifeboats ===
ON	Op.No. (Note: Op. No. is the RNLI's Operational Number of the boat carried on the hull.)	Name	Built	On station	Class	Comments
655	–	Priscilla Macbean	1921	1921–1927	35ft 6in Self-righting motor	
703	–	L.P. and St. Helen	1927	1927–1929	35ft 6in Self-righting motor	
673	–	Jane Holland	1922	1929–1949	40-foot Self-righting (Motor)	Previously at Selsey
859	–	Beryl Tollemache	1949	1949–1977	41-foot Beach Type	
948	–	Charles Dibdin (Civil Service No.32)	1959	1977–1979	42-foot Watson	Previously at Walmer
1055	37-37	Duke of Kent	1979	1979–1993	Rother	
1195	12-36	Royal Thames	1993	1993–2012	Mersey	
1303	16-23	Diamond Jubilee	2012	2012–2023	Tamar	Participated in HM The Queen Diamond Jubilee river pageant.
1213	14-15	Henry Heys Duckworth	1996	2023–2024	Trent	Relief lifeboat.
1197	14-02	Esme Anderson	1994	2024–	Trent	Previously at Ramsgate

More post-service details can be found on the respective lifeboat class pages.

=== Inshore lifeboats ===
Op.No.	Name	On station	Class	Comments
D-30	Unnamed	1964	D-class (RFD PB16)	
D-32	Unnamed	1965–1966	D-class (RFD PB16)	
D-113	Unnamed	1967–1968	D-class (RFD PB16)	
D-159	Unnamed	1968–1978	D-class (RFD PB16)	
D-266	Unnamed	1978–1986	D-class (RFD PB16)	
D-322	The Humphrey and Nora Tollemache	1986–1993	D-class (EA16)	
D-449	The Humphrey and Nora Tollemache II	1993–2001	D-class (EA16)	
D-570	Joan and Ted Wiseman 50	2001–2002	D-class (EA16)	
D-605	Joan and Ted Wiseman 50	2003–2011	D-class (IB1)	
D-744	Laurence and Percy Hobbs	2011–2023	D-class (IB1)	
D-876	The David H	2023–	D-class (IB1)	
D-909	The Peter Dixon	2026–	D-class (IB1)	On station for a trial period

== See also ==
- List of RNLI stations
- List of former RNLI stations
- Royal National Lifeboat Institution lifeboats
