= Broughty Ferry Lifeboat Station =

RNLI lifeboat station in Dundee, Scotland

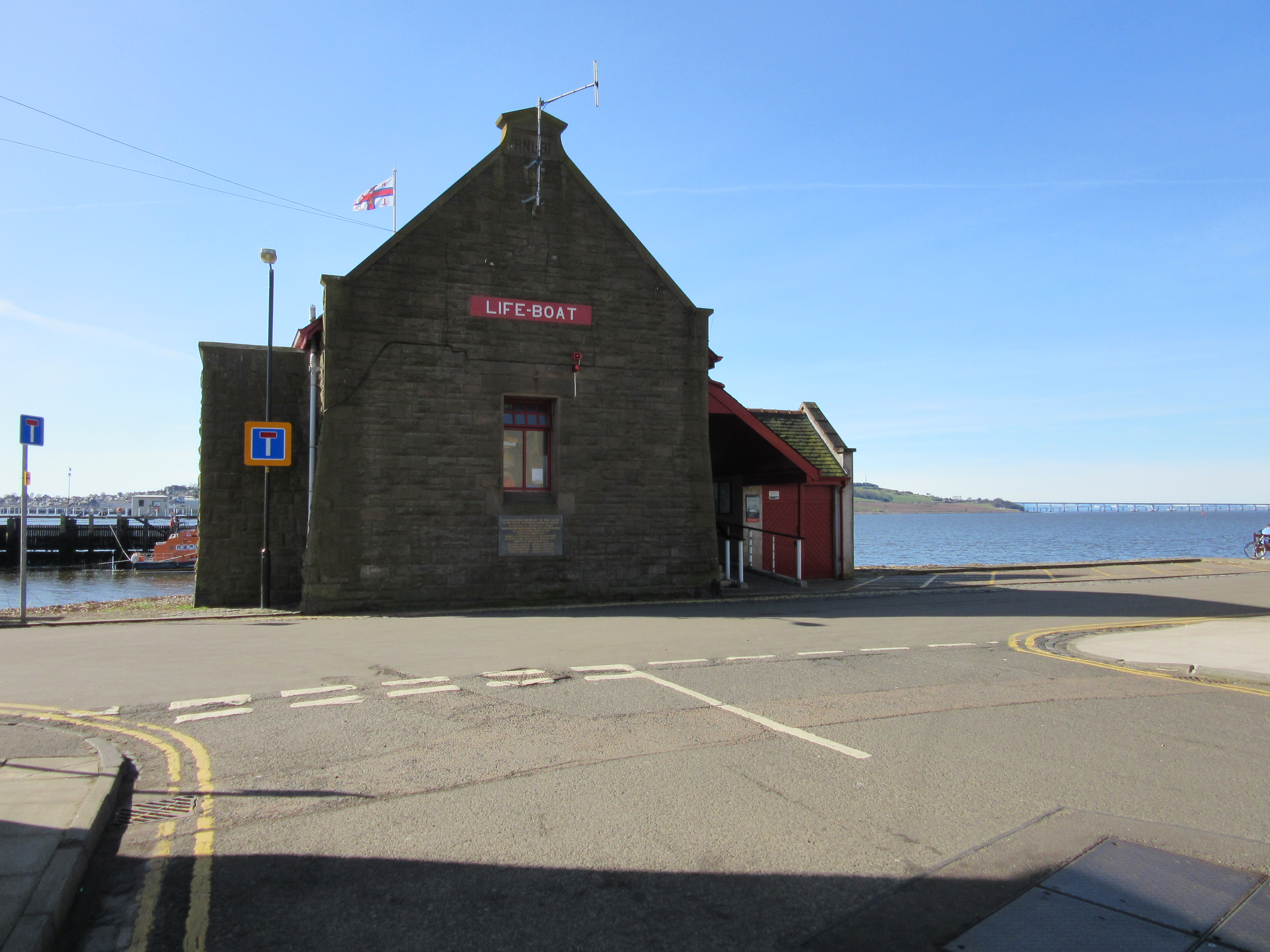
- Broughty Ferry Lifeboat Station

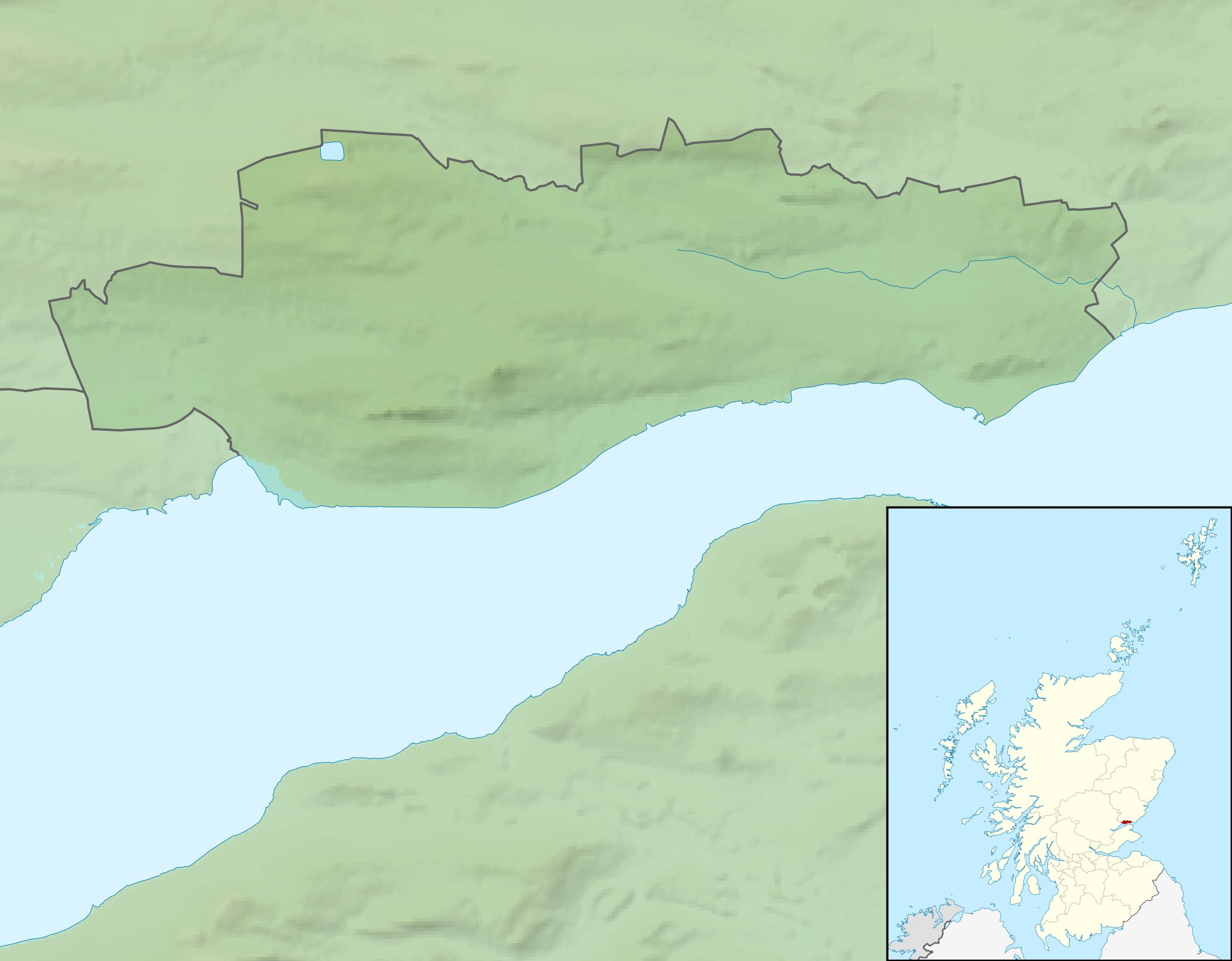
- Location within Dundee City council area

General information
- Type: RNLI Lifeboat Station
- Location: Fisher Street, Broughty Ferry, Dundee, DD5 1EF, Scotland
- Coordinates: 56°27′54.0″N 2°52′38.2″W
- Opened: 1862
- Owner: Royal National Lifeboat Institution

Website
- Broughty Ferry RNLI Lifeboat Station

Broughty Ferry Lifeboat Station is located at the bottom of Fort Street, in the town of Broughty Ferry, a suburb of Dundee on the north shore of the River Tay estuary, in the historic county of Angus, Scotland.

A lifeboat was first placed at Broughty Ferry by the Royal National Lifeboat Institution (RNLI) in 1862.

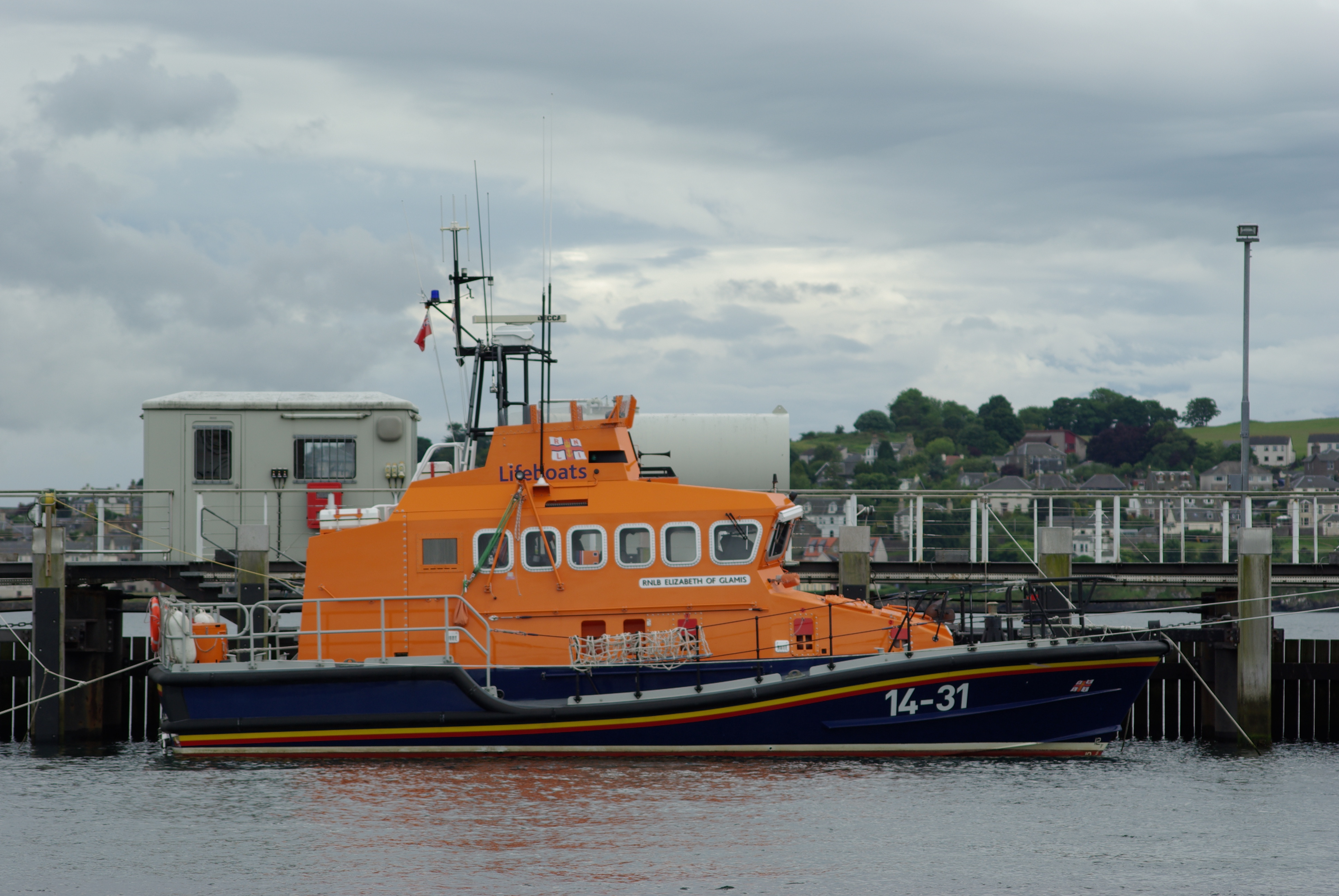
Trent-class lifeboat 14-31 Elizabeth of Glamis (ON 1252)

The station currently operates the All-weather Trent-class lifeboat, 14-31 Elizabeth of Glamis (ON 1252), on station since 2001, and the D-class (IB1) Inshore lifeboat Oor Lifesaver (D-834), on station since 2019.

== History ==
The first lifeboat based on the River Tay was placed at Buddon Ness, a headland at the mouth of the river. It was operated by the River Tay Lifeboat and Humane Society (RTLHS), established in 1830, following the wreck of the Childe Harold on 27 November 1829, whilst on passage from St Petersburg to Dundee.

In 1859, the RTLHS ordered a self-righting lifeboat from Calman and Martin of Dundee, similar in design to the RNLI Peake-class lifeboats. Under the instruction of the Society however, the air boxes, vital for self-righting, were reduced in size, as it was thought it would increase streamlining and speed. Under test, the boat failed to self-right. After this major failure, and with the Society now also short of funds, calls were made for the management of the lifeboats to be passed to the RNLI, and this was agreed in December 1861.

For further information, please see:–

- Buddon Ness Lifeboat Station

It had long been discussed that a lifeboat would be better suited to be based at Broughty Ferry, and in 1862, that is where the RNLI established a new station. A new boathouse was constructed at the bottom of Fort Street, on the foreshore, at a cost of £400. A new 32 ft (9.8 m) Peake-class lifeboat, built by Forrestt of Limehouse, and costing £205, was dispatched on 18 March 1862 aboard the steamship London, of the Dundee, Perth and London Shipping Company, arriving in Dundee on 22 March 1862. She was named Mary Hartley, after a fundraiser from Bideford, Devon.

The highs and lows of rescue were clearly shown on 24 November 1864, when the Mary Hartley was first called to the schooner David and John. Launched at 03:00, the lifeboat was towed to the vessel by the tugboat Hercules, and the crew of four were saved, moments before the vessel broke up. Arriving back at Broughty Ferry at 10:30, a fresh crew were awaiting the lifeboat, to set out on a second rescue. The lifeboat was launched again at 11:00, and was towed down river by the steamship Queen. It was too late. All 24 passengers and crew of the steamship Dalhousie, wrecked on the Abertay Sands whilst on passage from Newcastle upon Tyne to Dundee, had perished. It was the worst loss of life from shipwreck in the Tay area.

On 6 December 1865, the Mary Hartley failed to rescue five crew from the schooner Princess. The vessel was on passage from London to Dundee, when she was wrecked on the Abertay Sands. This was primarily due to delays finding a vessel to tow the lifeboat down the river, and this failure prompted the reopening of the Buddon Ness Lifeboat Station in 1867.

A slipway was constructed in 1889, at a cost of £130, to aid the launch of the recently arrived 37 ft (11 m) self-righting lifeboat. The lifeboat had been provided by the Ancient Order of Foresters, and the naming ceremony on 23 June 1888 was a grand affair. A procession around the town consisted of 2,500 members, and it is estimated there were 15,000 spectators. It is reported that the stationmaster at the railway station issued 4,334 tickets that day. The lifeboat was named Samuel Shawcross (ON 200), in honour of their permanent chief secretary since 1843.

At 01:00 on the 18 November 1893, pilot cutter No.2 of Dundee stranded on Abertay Sands in gale-force conditions, but it would be daybreak before the alarm was raised. The Samuel Shawcross set sail down the river, taking 30 minutes to reach the casualty vessel. Unable to get close, a line was thrown, and one by one, the seven crew were hauled through the water to the lifeboat. The steam tug Excelsior had been sent from Dundee, and towed the lifeboat back to harbour, to the cheers of the hundreds of people gathered to watch the outcome.

Broughty Ferry would receive the Maria (ON 560) in 1910, only the fourth motor-powered lifeboat in the RNLI fleet. To accommodate the larger 40 ft (12 m) boat, a new boathouse was required, and plans were drawn up as early as 1908. There was much difficulty with the local council, who insisted that the boathouse could not be built over the adjacent sewer, and at one point, offered the RNLI £100 just to leave the site. Terms were finally agreed, and the boathouse was constructed in time for the arrival of Maria. With no local electricity supply, a special supply was laid on from King street, costing the RNLI £6 per year. The boathouse is the one still in use today.

== RNLB Mona (ON 775) ==
See Main Article RNLB Mona (ON 775)

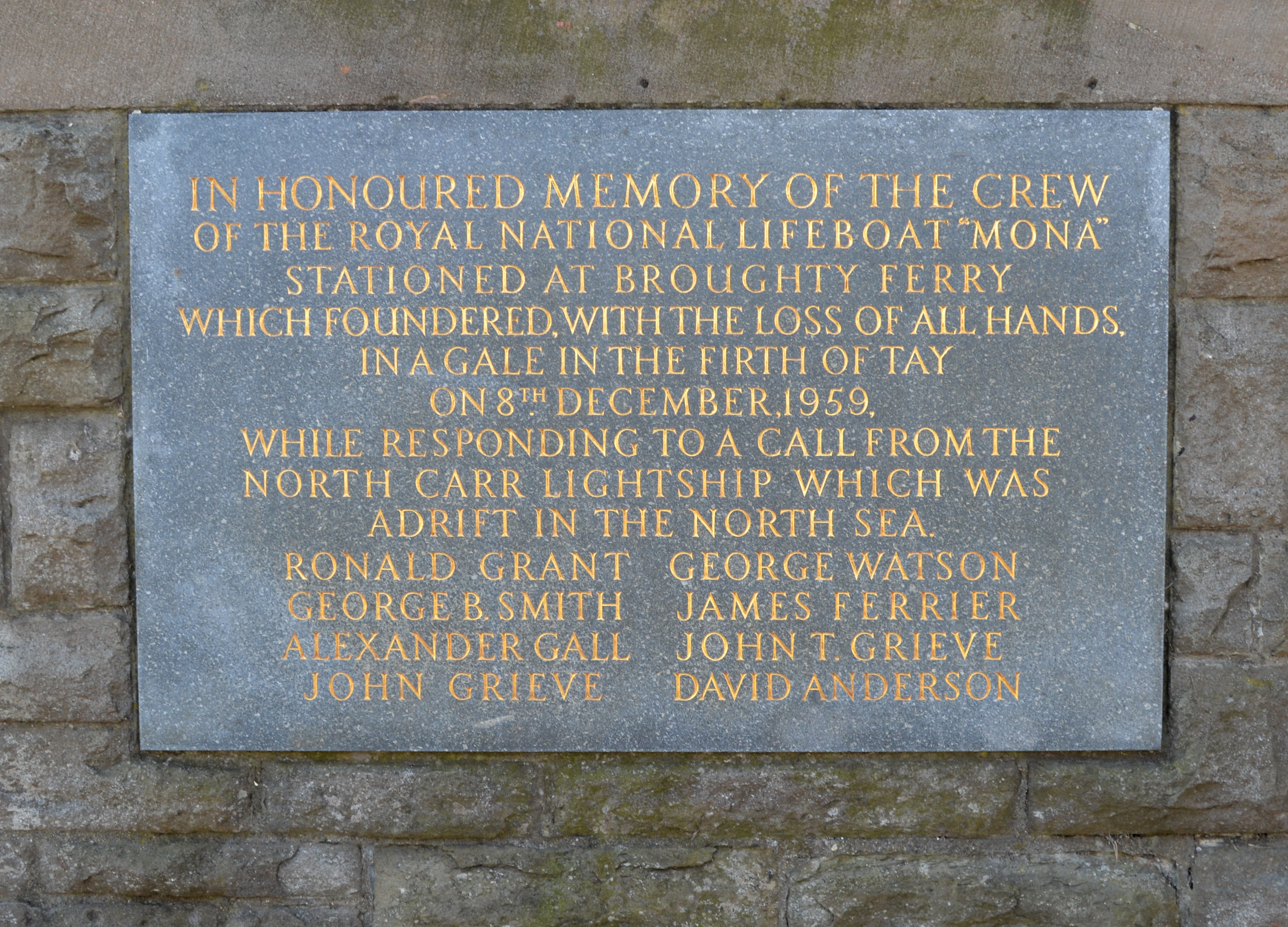
Memorial Plaque to the crew of the RNLB Mona (ON 775)

On 8 December 1959, the eight crew of the Broughty Ferry lifeboat Mona (ON 775) were lost, after the lifeboat capsized whilst on call to the North Carr Lightship, which was seen adrift in terrible conditions after the main anchor chain parted at 02:02. Setting out at 03:13, the last radio contact with the lifeboat was around 04:48, although the boat was seen some 40 minutes later.

Investigators later concluded that the boat was lost sometime between 05:30 and 06:00. The battered wreck of the lifeboat was found at daybreak on the shore of Buddon Ness. Amongst those onboard had been new Coxswain Ronald Grant, former Coxswain Alex Gall, bronze medal holders Second Coxswain George Bell Smith and Motor Mechanic John Grieve, along with John's son, John T. Grieve, aged 22.

The lifeboat was recovered by the Arbroath lifeboat Duke of Montrose (ON 934) and towed first to Arbroath, and then to the William Weatherhead shipyard at Cockenzie (at that time owned by regular lifeboat constructors J. Samuel White) for formal examination. Once investigation work was concluded, the boat lay stripped and abandoned at Cockenzie. In the early hours of Friday 18 March 1960, in a move not appreciated by many, but on the direct orders of the RNLI, the boat was towed around the breakwater, allowed to dry out, and destroyed by fire.

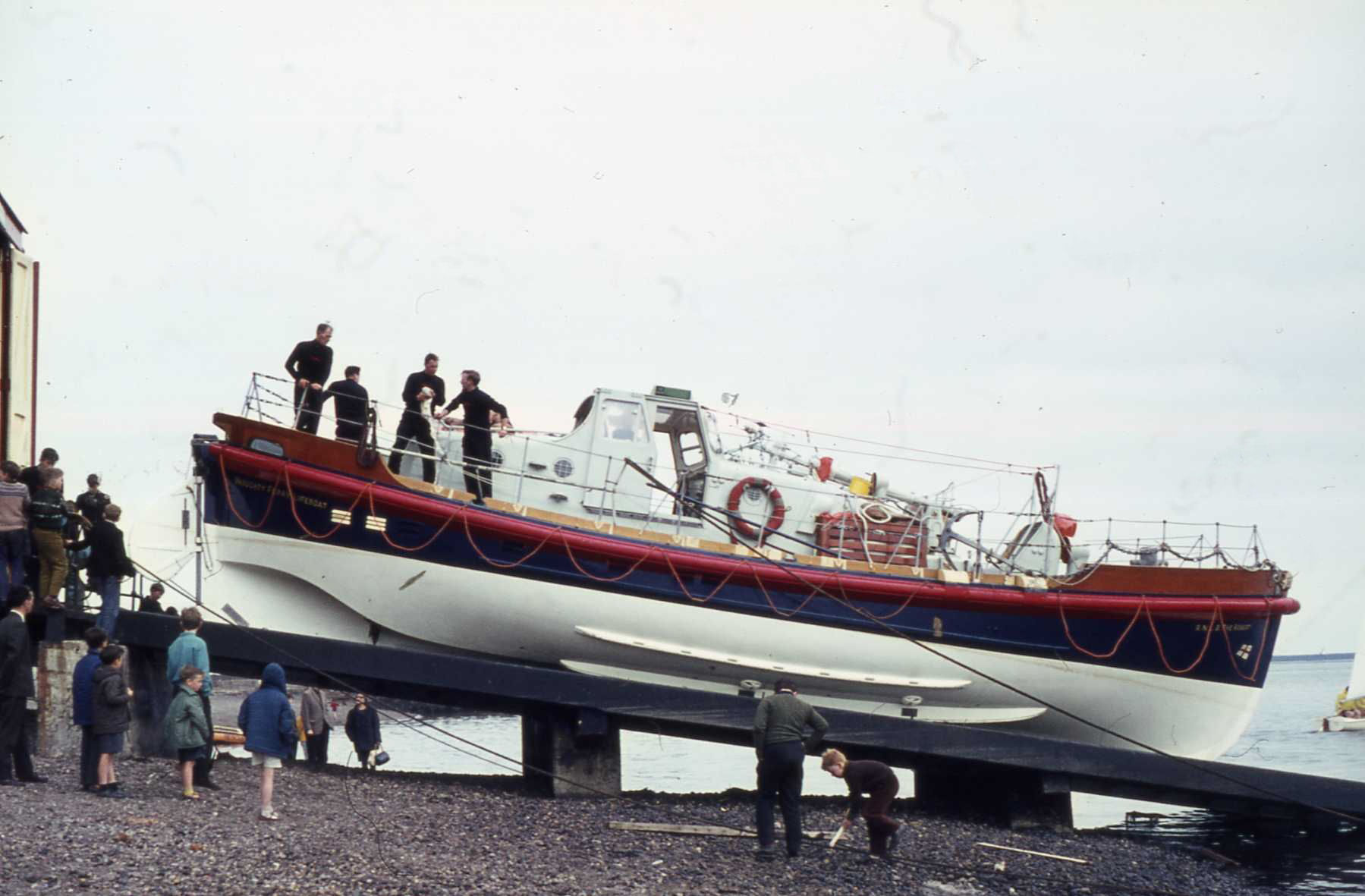
Broughty Ferry lifeboat The Robert (1960–1978)

The crew of the North Carr lightship survived, when their second, and then third emergency anchor held.

Two weeks after the disaster, the relief lifeboat, City of Bradford II (ON 709) was placed on station, and a new crew had already been found.

On 3 June 1962, a memorial plaque was unveiled on the north wall of the lifeboat house. The City of Bradford would return to the relief fleet in 1860, following the arrival of a new 47-foot Watson-class lifeboat, The Robert (ON 955).

== 1964 onwards ==
In 1962, the number of rescues or attempted rescues by All-weather lifeboats in the summer months was 98, with the number of lives rescued being 133. In 1963, in response to an increasing amount of water-based leisure activity, the RNLI began trials of small fast Inshore lifeboats, placed at various locations around the country. These were easily launched with just a few people, ideal to respond quickly to local emergencies. This quickly proved to be very successful. In 1963, there were 226 rescues or attempted rescues in the summer months, as a result of which 225 lives were saved.

Broughty Ferry would be the first station in Scotland to receive one of the new fast D-class (RFD PB16) Inshore lifeboats, which arrived in 1964. Officially unnamed, the boat was locally named Pinafore, as it had been funded by the Edinburgh University Savoy Opera Group production of HMS Pinafore.

Work began on a new landing stage in 2001, and on 14 April 2001, Broughty Ferry received the new 25 knot Trent-class lifeboat 14-31 Elizabeth of Glamis (ON 1252). This lifeboat is still on service at Broughty Ferry Lifeboat Station.

== Notable rescues ==
Both lifeboats from Arbroath and Broughty Ferry were launched to the aid of the steam trawler Quixotic of Aberdeen on 5 December 1939, when the vessel was driven on to Bell Rock. The Arbroath lifeboat arrived first, but attempts to veer down to the vessel failed when the anchor parted. The coxswain of the Broughty Ferry lifeboat Mona set anchor, and with a grappling hook aboard the vessel, pulled the lifeboat alongside the trawler. With heavy seas washing over both boats, the lifeboat managed to retrieve the nine crew in 30 minutes. For this service, Coxswain James Coull was awarded the RNLI Silver Medal, with Acting Second Coxswain George Bell Smith and Motor Mechanic John Grieve awarded the RNLI Bronze Medal.

== Station honours ==
The following are awards made at Broughty Ferry.

- RNIPLS Silver Medal
  Daniel Kidd, Fisherman – 1828
- RNLI Silver Medal
  James Coull, Coxswain – 1940
- RNLI Bronze Medal
  Charles Gall, Coxswain – 1920
  George Bell Smith, Acting Second Coxswain – 1940
  John Grieve, Motor Mechanic – 1940
- The Thanks of the Institution inscribed on Vellum
  Sam Craig, crew member – 1940
  G. Watson, crew member – 1940
  G. Gall, crew member – 1940
  William Findlay, crew member – 1940
  Robert Smith, crew member – 1940
- Member, Order of the British Empire (MBE)
  David Martin, Lifeboat Operations Manager – 2015NYH

== Roll of honour ==
In memory of those lost whilst serving Broughty Ferry lifeboat.

- Lifeboat Mona (ON 775), lost on service to the North Carr Lightship, 8 December 1959
  Ronald Grant, Coxswain (28)
  George Bell Smith, Second Coxswain (53)
  John Grieve, Motor Mechanic (56)
  George Watson, Bowman (38)
  David Gall Anderson (42)
  James Ferrier (43)
  Alex Gall, Former Coxswain (56)
  John T. Grieve (22)

== Broughty Ferry lifeboats ==
=== Pulling and Sailing (P&S) lifeboats ===
| ON (Note: ON is the RNLI's Official Number of the boat.) | Name | Built | On station | Class | Comments |
|---|---|---|---|---|---|
| Pre-385 | Mary Hartley | 1861 | 1862–1867 | 32-foot Peake self-righting (P&S) | (Note: 32-foot x 8-foot (10-oared) Peake-class self-righting lifeboat, funds collected by Mrs Mary Hartley of Bideford, built by Forrestt of Limehouse, London, costing £205.); Damaged 10 December 1863. Decayed and broken up in 1867. |
| Pre-282 | Mary Hartley | 1854 | 1867–1876 | 33-foot Peake self-righting (P&S) | (Note: 33-foot x 8-foot 6in (10-oared) Peake-class self-righting (P&S) lifeboat, originally built by R. Craggs of Stockton-on-Tees. Modified from 30-foot by Forrest of Limehouse, London in 1857.); Previously unnamed at Middlesbrough.Declared unfit in 1876. |
| Pre-606 | English Mechanic | 1876 | 1876–1889 | 33-foot Peake self-righting (P&S) | (Note: 33 ft 0 in (10.06 m) x 8 ft 6 in (2.59 m) (10-oared) Peake-class self-righting (P&S) lifeboat, funded by the English Mechanic magazine, via Passmore Edwards, built by Woolfe of Shadwell, London, costing £329.); Sold in 1889. |
| 200 | Samuel Shawcross | 1888 | 1888–1910 | 37-foot Watson (P&S) | (Note: 37 ft 0 in (11.28 m) x 8 ft 0 in (2.44 m) (12-oared) Watson-class non-self-righting (P&S) lifeboat, gift of the Ancient Order of Foresters, built by D. & W. Henderson & Co. of Partick, costing £576.); Condemned and sold in 1911. |

Pre ON numbers are unofficial numbers used by the Lifeboat Enthusiast Society to reference early lifeboats not included on the official RNLI list.

=== Motor lifeboats ===
| ON | Op.No. (Note: Op.No. is the RNLI's Operational Number of the boat carried on the hull.) | Name | Built | On station | Class | Comments |
|---|---|---|---|---|---|---|
| 560 | – | Maria | 1909 | 1910–1921 | 40-foot Watson | Transferred to Portpatrick. |
| 565 | – | John Ryburn | 1908 | 1921–1935 | 43-foot Watson | Previously at Stronsay and Peterhead. |
| 775 | – | Mona | 1935 | 1935–1959 | 45-foot 6in Watson | Wrecked on service, 8 December 1959. |
| 709 | – | City of Bradford II | 1929 | 1959–1960 | 45-foot 6in Watson | Lifeboat from the Relief fleet. Previously at Humber and Amble. |
| 955 | – | The Robert | 1060 | 1960–1978 | 47-foot Watson | Transferred to Baltimore. |
| 1056 | 52-09 | Spirit of Tayside | 1978 | 1978–1999 | 52-foot Arun | |
| 1099 | 52-29 | The Joseph Rothwell Sykes and Hilda M. | 1984 | 1999–2001 | 52-foot Arun | Lifeboat from the Relief fleet. Previously at Stromness. |
| 1252 | 14-31 | Elizabeth of Glamis | 2001 | 2001– | Trent | |

More post-service details can be found on the respective lifeboat class pages.

=== Inshore lifeboats ===
| Op.No. | Name | On station | Class | Comments |
|---|---|---|---|---|
| D-17 | Unnamed | 1964–1965 | D-class (RFD PB16) | Locally named Pinafore. |
| D-21 | Unnamed | 1965–1966 | D-class (RFD PB16) | |
| D-17 | Unnamed | 1966–1967 | D-class (RFD PB16) | |
| D-150 | Unnamed | 1967–1968 | D-class (RFD PB16) | |
| D-173 | Unnamed | 1968–1983 | D-class (RFD PB16) | |
| D-293 | Unnamed | 1983–1989 | D-class (RFD PB16) | |
| D-389 | Captain Colin | 1989–1998 | D-class (EA16) | |
| D-539 | Hartlepool Dynamo | 1998–2008 | D-class (EA16) | |
| D-698 | Sheila Barrie | 2008–2019 | D-class (IB1) | |
| D-834 | Oor Lifesaver | 2019– | D-class (IB1) | |

== See also ==
- List of RNLI stations
- List of former RNLI stations
- Royal National Lifeboat Institution lifeboats
