= Peterhead Lifeboat Station =

RNLI lifeboat station in Aberdeenshire, Scotland

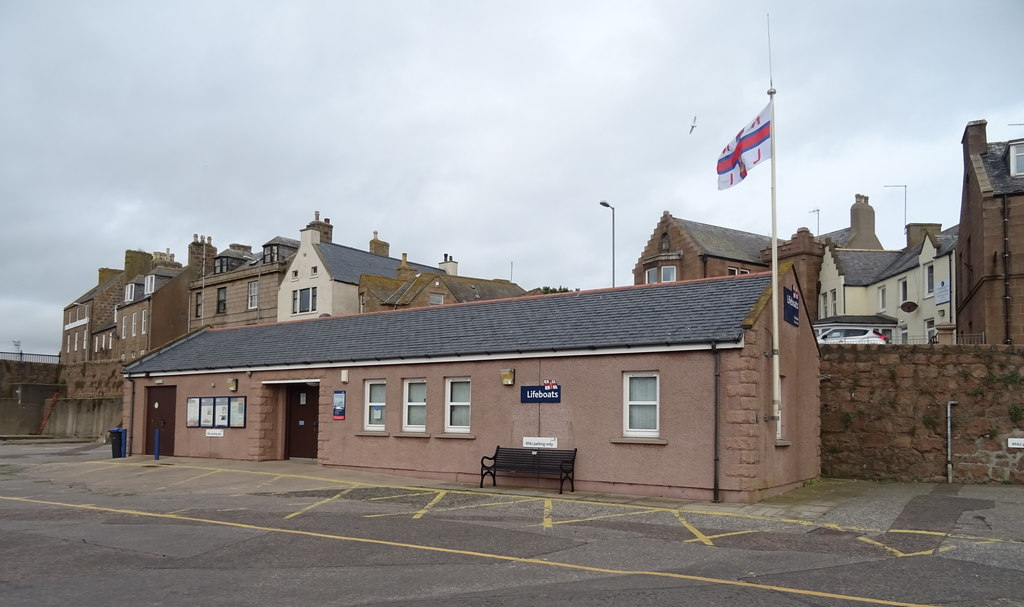
- Peterhead Lifeboat Station

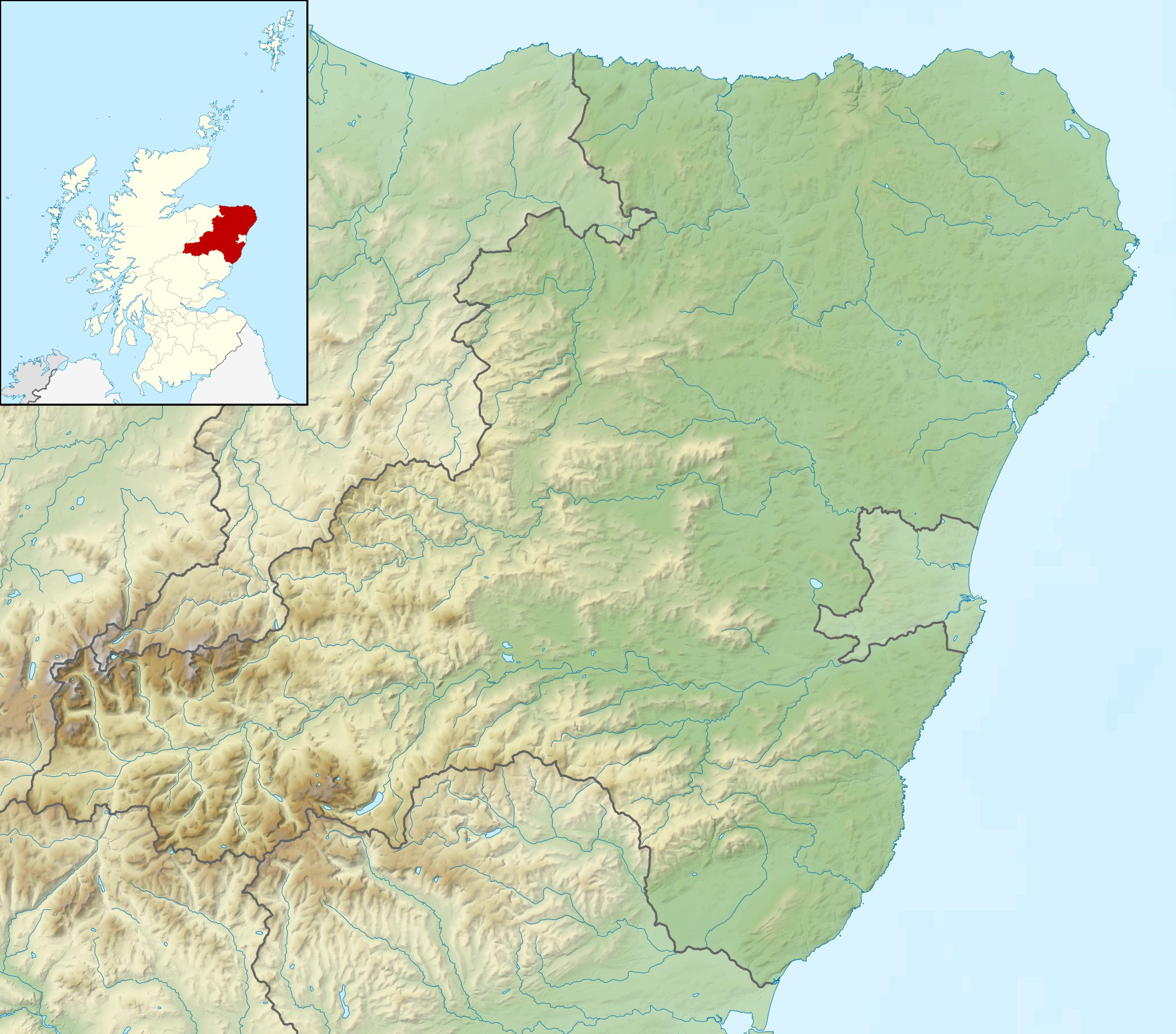
- Location within Aberdeenshire

General information
- Type: RNLI Lifeboat Station
- Location: West Pier, Peterhead, Aberdeenshire, AB42 1DZ, Scotland
- Coordinates: 57°30′11.1″N 1°46′28.7″W
- Opened: 1865
- Owner: Royal National Lifeboat Institution

Website
- Peterhead RNLI Lifeboat Station

Peterhead Lifeboat Station is located at West Pier, in the harbour town of Peterhead, on the east coast of Aberdeenshire, Scotland.

A lifeboat was first stationed at Peterhead in 1865, by the Royal National Lifeboat Institution (RNLI).

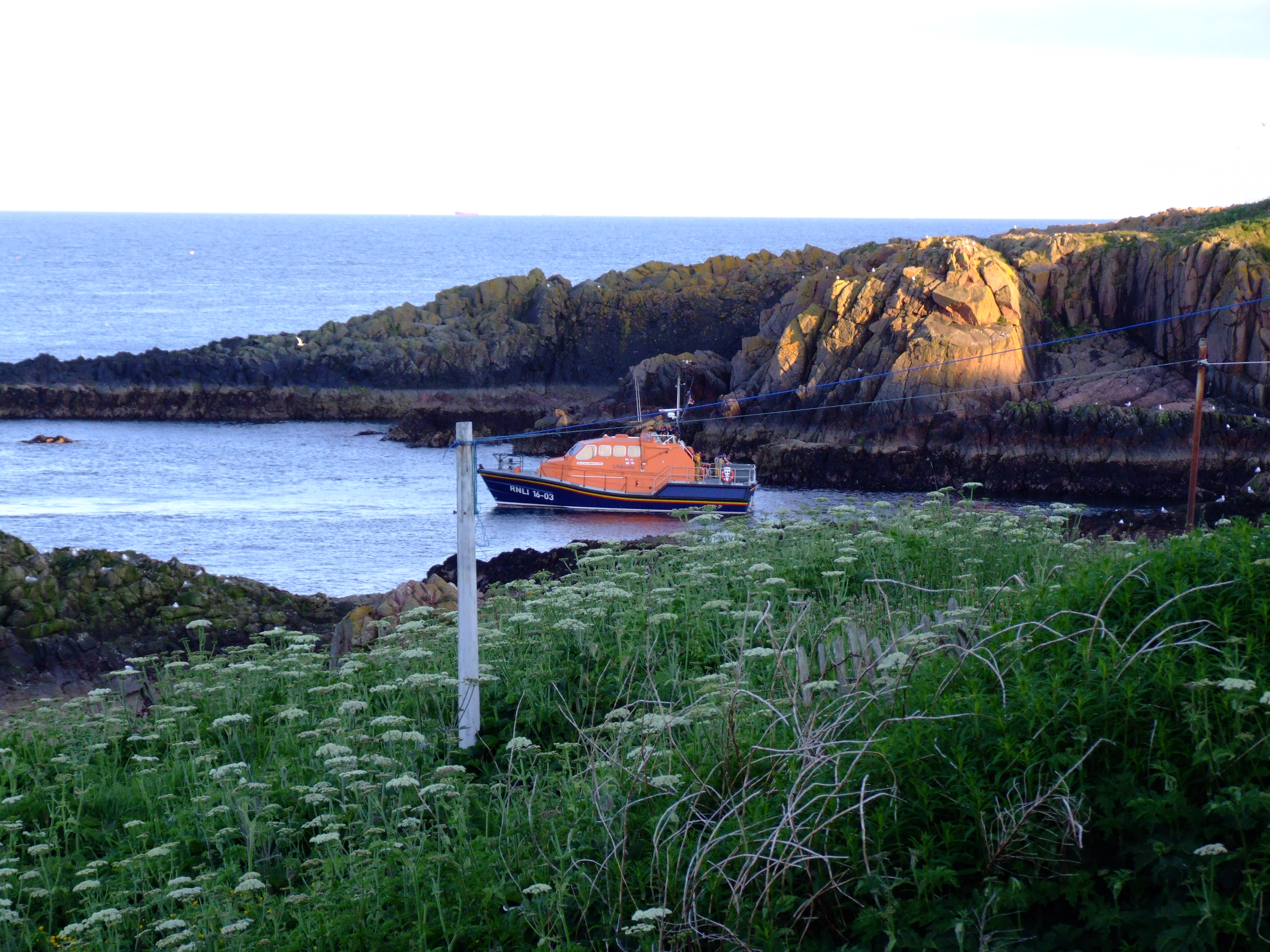
Tamar-class lifeboat, 16-03 The Misses Robertson of Kintail (ON 1282) out on exercise

The station currently operates a Tamar-class All-weather lifeboat, 16-03 The Misses Robertson of Kintail (ON 1282), on station since 2006.

== History ==
Ever since its founding in 1824 by Sir William Hillary Bt., the Royal National Institution for the Preservation of Life from Shipwreck (RNIPLS), and later as the RNLI since 1854, would award medals for deeds of gallantry at sea, even if no lifeboats were involved. Six RNIPLS Silver Medals were awarded at Peterhead before 1840.

At the meeting of the RNLI committee of management, assistant Inspector of Lifeboats, Capt. D. Robertson, RN, reported on his visit to Scotland, and recommended that a new station be established at Peterhead.

The first Peterhead lifeboat was a 33 ft (10 m) self-righting 'Pulling and Sailing' (P&S) lifeboat, one with sails and (10) oars, placed on service in 1865, and named People's Journal No.1 (ON 240). The boat and carriage were transported to Peterhead free of charge by various railway companies, and was placed on display in Aberdeen, before its arrival at Peterhead. The boat had been funded from an appeal by the Dundee periodical newspaper The People's Journal, managed by editor W. D. Latto. The appeal had also raised enough money to fund a second boat, People's Journal No.2, which was placed at Arbroath.

A boathouse was constructed on the eastern side of South Harbour, at the end of Castle street, next to the Coastguard Station, at a cost of £120.

The lifeboat station was rebuilt and enlarged in 1900, but in 1908, the slipway was removed, and the lifeboat was moored afloat.

In 1911, it was decided to open a No.2 station, and place an additional lifeboat at Peterhead. A site was chosen on the western side of South Harbour, off Lodge Walk / Merchants Quay. Five tenement houses were purchased at a cost of £445 in order to acquire the site. A boathouse with slipway was estimated to cost £2000, which was completed in 1912. The 43-foot Watson-class non-self-righting motor lifeboat Alexander Tulloch (ON 622) was placed on station.

On 26 December 1914, a former fishing trawler, which had been requisitioned by the Royal Navy as a minesweeper, HMS Tom Tit (H35), was wrecked on the Horseback Rock at Peterhead, during a full south-south-easterly gale. The Peterhead No.2 lifeboat Alexander Tulloch was launched to the rescue, but was capsized and wrecked. Three of the lifeboat crew were lost. The crew of the Tom Tit were rescued by the Rocket Brigade. Lifeboatman Charles Cameron died some years later of illness, aggravated by the exposure and injuries suffered in 1914.

The Russian steamship Kiev ran aground on Rattray Head on 26 October 1916, on passage from Arkhangelsk (Archangel) to Leith with 69 crew and 22 passengers. The Peterhead lifeboat John Ryburn (ON 565) arrived to the wreck, but couldn't get alongside. Seven or eight people were lost off the Kiev, but 60 people were rescued one by one, being pulled through the water by line to the lifeboat. A further 14 were found in the ships boat, and towed to shore. Another 10 people were rescued by other means. £550 was gifted to the RNLI by the Russian Volunteer Fleet, in recognition of the service to SS Kiev. James and William Cameron received the Carnegie Hero Fund award, with James also receiving the RNLI Silver Medal.

In 1928, the 37-foot pulling and sailing lifeboat George Pickard (ON 400) was withdrawn, and the No.1 station was closed. The lifeboat had been on station for 31 years. By this time, there had been a motor-powered lifeboat at the No.2 station for 16 years. George Pickard (ON 400) was sold out of service, and spent many years as a yacht, until finally being broken up in 2007. From 1928, the No.2 station became the primary station.

== Notable rescues ==
Between the morning of 23 January 1942, and mid-day on the 26 January 1942, the Peterhead lifeboat Julia Park Barry of Glasgow (ON 819) was launched four times, to three steamships, the Fidra (26 crew) of Glasgow, the Runswick (44 crew), and the Saltwick (36 crew), the latter two vessels both of Whitby. All three vessels had run aground off Peterhead in blizzard conditions, with winds up to 105 miles per hour (169 km/h). The lifeboat was at sea for over nine hours, with the crew standing by for 54 hours, with little rest. Showing extraordinary determination and courage, the lifeboat rescued a total of 106 lives, over a period of 75 hours.

Six members of the crew were awarded the RNLI Bronze Medal. David Falconer Wiseman, the Motor Mechanic, was awarded the RNLI Silver Medal. In the first such award in Scotland for 104 years, Coxswain John Buchan McLean received the RNLI Gold Medal.

== 1980s onward ==
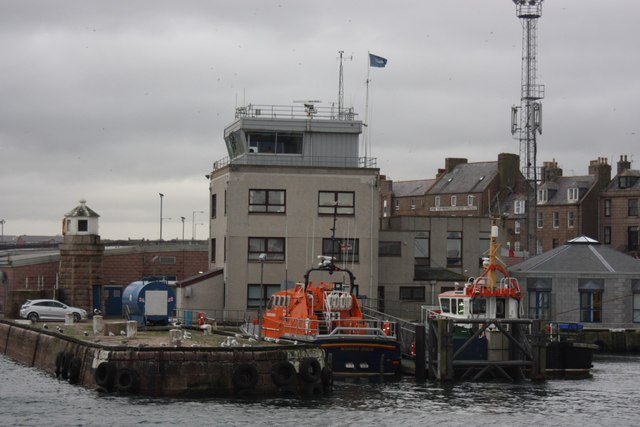
Peterhead lifeboat berth

In 1986, Peterhead received a new Tyne-class lifeboat, funded by The Robertson Trust, a philanthropic organisation, established in 1961 by the Robertson sisters – Elspeth, Agnes and Ethel (Babs), who donated their shares in the family businesses (drinks company Edrington) to the Trust, to be used for charitable purposes. At a ceremony on 21 May 1988, with the lifeboat presented on the slipway, the lifeboat was named Babs and Agnes Robertson (ON 1127), after two of the sisters.

In May 1999, a new station building with improved crew facilities was constructed close to the 1912 station, at West Pier. A new berth was created for the lifeboat to remain afloat, just inside the South Harbour.

In 2006, the Tyne-class lifeboat Babs & Agnes Robertson (ON 1127) was transferred to The Mumbles, and Peterhead, along with Tenby, would be one of the first two stations to receive the new 16 m (52 ft) Tamar-class lifeboat. The Robertson Trust once again funded the lifeboat. At a ceremony on 11 May, Shonaig Macpherson CBE, Trustee of The Robertson Trust, named the lifeboat The Misses Robertson of Kintail (ON 1282), in memory of three sisters Agnes, Babs and Elspeth.

== Station honours ==
The following are awards made at Peterhead:

- RNLI Gold Medal
  John Buchan McLean, Coxswain – 1942
- RNIPLS Silver Medal
  John Sutter, Master Mariner – 1827
  Alexander Mackintosh, Master Mariner – 1827
  James Wallace, Master Mariner – 1827
  Lt. Andrew Sims, RN, Chief Officer of H.M. Coastguard – 1829
  Lt. Andrew Sims, RN, Chief Officer of H.M. Coastguard – 1836 (Second-Service award)
  John Gray, Master of the ship Eclipse – 1840
- RNLI Silver Medal
  Godfrey Bosville McDonald Beatson, Chief Officer, H.M. Coastguard – 1863
  Alexander Forbes, Shipbuilder – 1863
  James Cameron, Coxswain – 1916
  John Reid Strachan, Coxswain – 1933
  David Falconer Wiseman, Mechanic – 1942
- RNLI Bronze Medal
  James Cameron, Coxswain – 1917
  David Falconer Wiseman, Motor Mechanic – 1933
  Alexander Wilson Hepburn, Assistant Second Coxswain – 1942
  William Strachan, Acting Bowman – 1942
  William Summers, Assistant Mechanic – 1942
  George Cordiner, Crew Member – 1942
  Alexander Gowans, Crew Member – 1942
  Alexander Strachan, Crew Member – 1942
  Capt. James Winter, Harbour Master, Acting Coxswain – 1943
- Carnegie Hero Fund award
  James Cameron – 1917
  William Cameron – 1917
- 'The Thanks of the Institution inscribed on Vellum'
  William Boyd, Honorary Secretary – 1896 (30 years service)
  John Buchan, Coxswain/Mechanic – 1979
  John B. McLean, Coxswain/Mechanic – 1987
- Testimonial on Vellum awarded by the Royal Humane Society
  John Buchan McLean, Coxswain – 1951
  Stephen Ritchie, Probationary Crew Member – 2005
- Member, Order of the British Empire (MBE)
  David Martin, Lifeboat Operations Manager – 2015NHY

== Roll of honour ==
In memory of those lost whilst serving Peterhead lifeboat:

- Lost on service to HMS Tom Tit, when the lifeboat Alexander Tulloch (ON 622) was wrecked, 26 December 1914
  James Geddes, Second Coxswain
  Thomas Geddes
  David Strachan
  Charles Cameron (died some years later from the effects of exposure)

== Peterhead lifeboats ==
=== Peterhead No.1 station ===
ON (Note: ON is the RNLI's Official Number of the boat.)	Name	Built	On station	Class	Comments
240	People's Journal No.1	1865	1865−1893	33-foot Peake self-righting (P&S)	(Note: 33 ft 0 in (10.06 m) x 8 ft 1 in (2.46 m) (10-oared) Peake-class self-righting (P&S) lifeboat, funded by the readers of the People's Journal of Dundee, built by Forrestt of Limehouse, London, costing £284.); Broken up in 1893.
342	George Pickard	1892	1893−1897	38-foot self-righting (P&S)	(Note: 38 ft 0 in (11.58 m) x 8 ft 0 in (2.44 m) (12-oared) self-righting (P&S) lifeboat, legacy of Mr A. Pickard of Leeds, built by Chambers and Colby of Lowestoft, costing £489.); Broken up in 1897.
400	George Pickard	1897	1897−1928	37-foot self-righting (P&S)	(Note: 37 ft 0 in (11.28 m) x 9 ft 3 in (2.82 m) (10-oared) self-righting (P&S) lifeboat, legacy of Mr A. Pickard of Leeds, built by Rutherford of Birkenhead, costing £604.); Sold in 1928. Renamed Fisher Lassie. Reverted to George Pickard, but broken up at Tyne Dock in July 2007.

No.1 station closed, 1928

=== Peterhead No.2 station ===
ON	Name	Built	On station	Class	Comments
622	Alexander Tulloch	1912	1912−1914	43-foot Watson	Wrecked on service with the loss of 3 crew, 26 December 1914.
565	John Ryburn	1908	1915−1921	43-foot Watson	One of the first two purpose-built motor-powered RNLI lifeboats. Previously at Stronsay. Transferred to Broughty Ferry.
668	Duke of Connaught	1921	1921−1928	45-foot Watson	

No.2 station becomes primary station, 1928

=== Peterhead lifeboat station ===
ON	Op.No. (Note: Op.No. is the RNLI's Operational Number of the boat carried on the hull.)	Name	Built	On station	Class	Comments
668	−	Duke of Connaught	1921	1928−1939	45-foot Watson	
819	−	Julia Park Barry of Glasgow	1939	1939−1969	46-foot Watson	
1008	48-005	James and Mariska Joicey	1969	1969−1986	Solent	Transferred to The Lizard
1127	47-019	Babs and Agnes Robertson	1987	1986−2006	Tyne	Transferred to The Mumbles
1282	16-03	The Misses Robertson of Kintail	2006	2006−	Tamar	

More post-service details can be found on the respective lifeboat class pages.

== See also ==
- List of RNLI stations
- List of former RNLI stations
- Royal National Lifeboat Institution lifeboats
