= Buddon Ness Lifeboat Station =

Former RNLI lifeboat station in Angus, Scotland

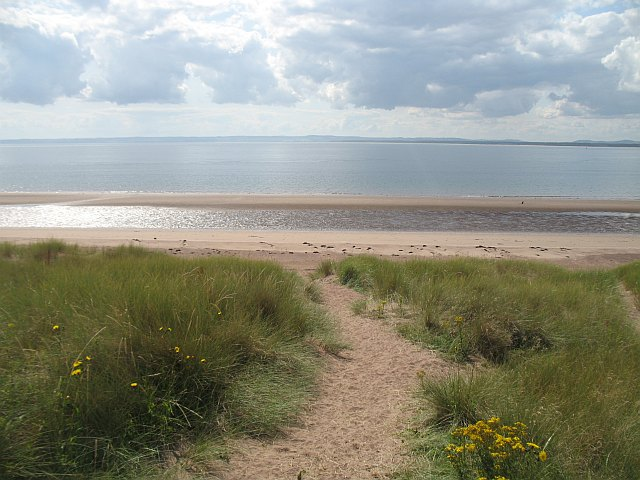
- View from Buddon Ness

- Buddon Ness, Angus

General information
- Status: Closed
- Location: Buddon Ness, Angus , DD7 7RY, Scotland
- Coordinates: 56°28′07.7″N 2°45′29.1″W
- Opened: 1830–1861 RTLHS; 1861–1894 RNLI
- Closed: 1894

Buddon Ness Lifeboat Station was located on the north shore of the River Tay estuary, on the headland between Carnoustie and Monifieth, near the Buddon Ness High Lighthouse, in the historic county of Angus, Scotland.

A lifeboat was first placed at Buddon Ness by the River Tay Lifeboat and Humane Society (RTLHS) in 1830, with management of the station transferring to the Royal National Lifeboat Institution (RNLI) in 1861.

The station was closed briefly between December 1863 and March 1867, after the lifeboat sank at her moorings. The station was closed permanently in February 1894.

== History ==
It was the wreck of the Childe Harold on 27 November 1829, on passage from St Petersburg to Dundee, that finally prompted action regarding provision of a lifeboat on the River Tay.

The River Tay Lifeboat and Humane Society was established. £80 was raised, and with the promise of further donations, a 'North Country' type lifeboat, based on the designs of Henry Greathead, was ordered from Robson of South Shields in 1830. A boathouse and slipway were constructed at Buddon Ness, 10 miles (16 km) to the east of Dundee, at the mouth of the River Tay, at a cost of £206.

Whilst the lifeboat was stationed in an ideal location for likely shipwreck, it wasn't ideal for a crew, that would have to be drawn from the fishermen of Broughty Ferry, some 6 miles (9.7 km) away, with access on foot. There are no records of any service, until September 1835, when the boat was removed to Dundee for repairs.

The question of the location of the lifeboat was raised at the time, highlighting the amount of time it took to access and get the boat ready, but it was still preferred option rather than row the 6 miles (9.7 km) from Broughty Ferry to Buddon Ness, and the boat was placed back at Buddon Ness after repairs were completed in October 1835. The first service launch would come just days later on 3 November 1835, to the sloop Industry, wrecked on Gaa Sands, whilst on passage from North Shields to Dundee, but with just one of the two man crew saved.

However, when Lt. Peter Stark RN, of H.M. Coastguard, tried to raise a lifeboat crew to go to the aid of the brig Mary on Dec 26 1836, only two volunteers came forward. The Mary was driven ashore and wrecked, whilst on passage from Liepāja, Latvia, to Dundee. All eight crew were lost. It is thought the reluctance to volunteer was due to the vessel having a cargo of flax, thought by many to carry the disease Cholera. At the time, all vessels entering Dundee with flax were required to quarantine.

There were no such difficulties raising a crew to the aid of the Scottish sloop Two Sisters of Kirkcaldy on 11 April 1837. All aboard were rescued, with Lt. Stark receiving the RNIPLS Silver Medal, awarded by the Royal National Institution for the Preservation of Life from Shipwreck (RNIPLS), later to become the RNLI.

Stark would be appointed Coxswain of the lifeboat in June 1837. It was decided for ease of launching that the boat would be moored afloat, with boarding boats provided. It was also decided, in order to help the Society, ever short of finances, for dues to be levied on ships entering Dundee harbour, which would ensure that a crew would be available, by agreeing payments for launching and rescues.

In March 1838, all five crew were rescued from the brig Ranger, bound for Perth from South Shields, when she was swept onto Elbow End. Lt. Stark received the RNIPLS Gold Medal, and in recognition of his part in the saving of over 60 lives during his service, would be made a Freeman of the City of Dundee.

In 1859, the RTLHS decided to order a new self-righting lifeboat, which was built at the Calman and Martin shipyard in Dundee. It was based on the RNLI Peake-design, but the air-cases were much reduced in size, the Society believing that this would make the boat more streamlined and easier to row. Launched in October 1859, at King William IV dock in Dundee, the boat failed to self-right, only doing so with assistance from a crane. Assigned to Buddon Ness station, the boat would only be called twice. On the second call, on 11 November 1861, the lifeboat was found to be full of water, the relieving valves not working. The rescue of the Norwegian brigantine Marionne was abandoned until the weather improved, the ship's crew not being in immediate danger, and in a far safer place than the lifeboat. These absolute failures, along with news that the Society had run out of funds, prompted calls for operations to be handed over to the RNLI, and this was agreed by both parties in December 1861.

A new RNLI station was established at Broughty Ferry in 1862, and the Calman and Martin boat was withdrawn. The old Robson-built boat, which had served since 1830, returned to service at Buddon Ness. On 3 December 1862, the Buddon Ness lifeboat saved all six crew of the schooner Osprey. In October 1863, on service to the vessel Giulia, the lifeboat was washed away (empty), whilst under tow from the tug Samson, and eventually found near Carnoustie. Old and worn out, she would sink on her moorings in a gale on 9 December 1863. With a new RNLI boat based at Broughty Ferry, it was decided, for now, to close the Buddon Ness station.

On 6 December 1865, the Broughty Ferry lifeboat Mary Hartley failed to rescue five crew from the schooner Princess, on passage from London to Dundee, when she was wrecked on the Abertay Sands. This was primarily due to delays finding a vessel to tow the lifeboat down the river, and prompted the reopening of the Buddon Ness station.

In March 1867, Buddon Ness Lifeboat Station was reopened, and the RNLI placed a 33-foot (12-oared) self-righting 'Pulling and Sailing' (P&S) lifeboat, one with sails and (12) oars, at Buddon Ness. She was experimentally constructed of iron, and had previously served at Teignmouth, where she was found to be too heavy to launch easily, and at New Brighton, where she was too small. She was placed at the mooring at Buddon Ness, and a new shed was constructed for the storage of equipment. Named the Eleanora, she would serve at Buddon Ness for just three years, until 1870.

Two further lifeboats would serve at Buddon Ness. In 1870, a standard wooden 33-foot self-righting lifeboat was placed at Buddon Ness, firstly again named Eleanora, later being renamed May in 1879. In 1888, a new 37-foot self-righting lifeboat, again named May (ON 196), was placed on station. With declining calls, an active and now well established station at Broughty Ferry, and at the request of the Dundee RNLI branch committee, Buddon Ness Lifeboat Station was closed in February 1894.

There are no remains of any station buildings. The last lifeboat on station, May (ON 196), was transferred to the relief fleet, later to serve at Portpatrick and Montrose.

== Station honours ==
The following are awards made at Buddon Ness.

- RNIPLS Gold Medal

Lt. Peter Stark, RN, H.M. Coastguard – 1838

- RNIPLS Silver Medal

Lt. Peter Stark, RN, H.M. Coastguard – 1837

- Freeman of the City of Dundee

Lt. Peter Stark, RN, H.M. Coastguard – 1838

== Buddon Ness lifeboats ==
=== Pulling and Sailing (P&S) lifeboats ===
| ON (Note: ON is the RNLI's Official Number of the boat.) | Name | Built | On station | Class | Comments |
|---|---|---|---|---|---|
| Pre-146 | Unnamed | 1830 | 1830–1859 | 30-foot North Country | (Note: 30-foot x 9-foot 9in (12-oared) North Country non-self-righting lifeboat, built by Robson of South Shields, costing £130.); Returned to service in 1861. |
| Pre-353 | Unnamed | 1859 | 1859–1862 | 32-foot Peake Self-righting (P&S) | (Note: 32-foot x 7-foot 9in modified Peake-class self-righting (P&S) lifeboat, built by Calman and Martin of Dundee, costing £130.) |
| Pre-146 | Unnamed | 1830 | 1862–1863 | 30-foot North Country | |
Station Closed 1863–1867
| Pre-406 | Eleanora | 1863 | 1867–1870 | 33-foot Iron Self-righting (P&S) | (Note: 33-foot x 8-foot 2in (10-oared) Iron self-righting (P&S) lifeboat, gift of an anonymous 'lady', built by Hepworth of Millwall, costing £351 when new.); Previously at Teignmouth and New Brighton. Remained at Buddon Ness until 1874 |
| Pre-545 | Eleanora | 1870 | 1870–1880 | 33-foot Peake Self-righting (P&S) | (Note: 33-foot x 8-foot 6in (10-oared) Peake-class self-righting (P&S) lifeboat, gift of an anonymous 'lady', built by Woolfe of Shadwell, London, costing £290.); Renamed May in 1880. |
| Pre-545 | May | 1870 | 1880–1888 | 33-foot Peake Self-righting (P&S) | (Note: Gift of Anon 'D'.) |
| 196 | May | 1888 | 1888–1894 | 37-foot Self-righting (P&S) | (Note: 37-foot x 8-foot (12-oared) self-righting (P&S) lifeboat, Gift of Anon 'D', built by D. and W. Henderson and Company of Partick, costing £542. .costing £543.) |

Station Closed, 1894

Pre ON numbers are unofficial numbers used by the Lifeboat Enthusiast Society to reference early lifeboats not included on the official RNLI list.

== See also ==
- List of RNLI stations
- List of former RNLI stations
- Royal National Lifeboat Institution lifeboats
