= RNLB Mona =

Scottish lifeboat that capsized during rescue

History
- Operator: Royal National Lifeboat Institution
- Builder: J. Samuel White
- In service: 1935–1959
- Official Number: ON 775

General characteristics
- Class & type: Watson-class
- Length: 45 ft 6 in (13.87 m)

RNLB Mona (ON 775) was a Watson-Class lifeboat based at Broughty Ferry in Scotland, that capsized during a rescue attempt, with the loss of her entire crew of eight men. The Mona was built in 1935, and, in her time, saved 118 lives.

== Background ==
There had been a lifeboat based at Broughty Ferry since 1859, with the Royal National Lifeboat Institution taking over the running of the lifeboat station two years later. The Mona arrived at Broughty Ferry in May 1935. A motor vessel, she was capable of carrying 120 people.

== The loss of the Mona ==
At 3:13 am on 8 December 1959, the Mona was launched to assist the North Carr Lightship, which was reported adrift in St Andrews Bay. Weather conditions were exceptionally severe, with a strong south-easterly gale, and the Broughty Ferry lifeboat was the only boat in the area able to launch. The Mona was seen clearing the Tay and heading south into St Andrews Bay. Her last radio message was at 4:48 am. As the Mona was struggling to reach the North Carr reef, off the coast of Fife, the lightship's crew of six were able to drop their spare anchor. They were all rescued alive and well by helicopter the next morning, 24 hours after the first call for help had gone out. After a helicopter search, the Mona was found capsized on Buddon Sands. Her crew of eight (Ronald Grant, George Smith, Alexander Gall, John Grieve, George Watson, James Ferrier, John T. Grieve and David Anderson) had all drowned. The boat was burned on the beach.

== Aftermath ==
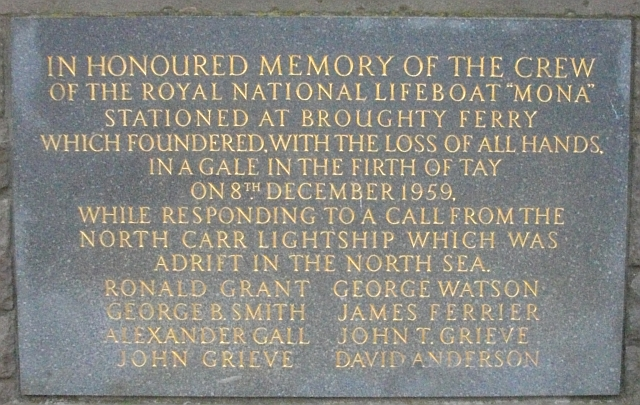
Mona Memorial, Broughty Ferry Lifeboat Station.

The Mona disaster was the subject of an official investigation, in which the boat was described as having been 100% seaworthy at the time of the accident.

The scale of the tragedy stunned the local community, and a disaster fund raised more than £77,000 in less than a month. By the time a relief lifeboat arrived at Broughty Ferry two weeks after the disaster, 38 volunteers had signed up to form a new crew.

The incident was immortalised in song by Peggy Seeger entitled "The Lifeboat Mona", which was sung by The Dubliners, commemorating its great achievements and the hardships the crew endured. The names of the men who died are commemorated on a plaque on the side of the present day boat house.

The 50th anniversary of the disaster, in 2009, saw a number of memorial events organised to mark the occasion. These included a memorial concert on the actual anniversary date. and talks entitled The Mona Remembered at the local church on 23 and 25 November.

According to a letter to the Dundee Evening Telegraph, in January 2006, "Among some seamen, it was believed the vessel was tainted with evil, and they resolved to exorcise the boat in a 'viking ritual'". The Mona was taken to Cockenzie harbour on the river Forth in the dead of night, stripped of anything of value, chained to the sea wall, and burnt. Questions were raised in the House of Commons about the destruction of a lifeboat built with public subscription.

The lightvessel, later replaced by a beacon, is now berthed at Victoria Dock, Dundee harbour.
