= Portpatrick Lifeboat Station =

RNLI Lifeboat station in Dumfries and Galloway, Scotland

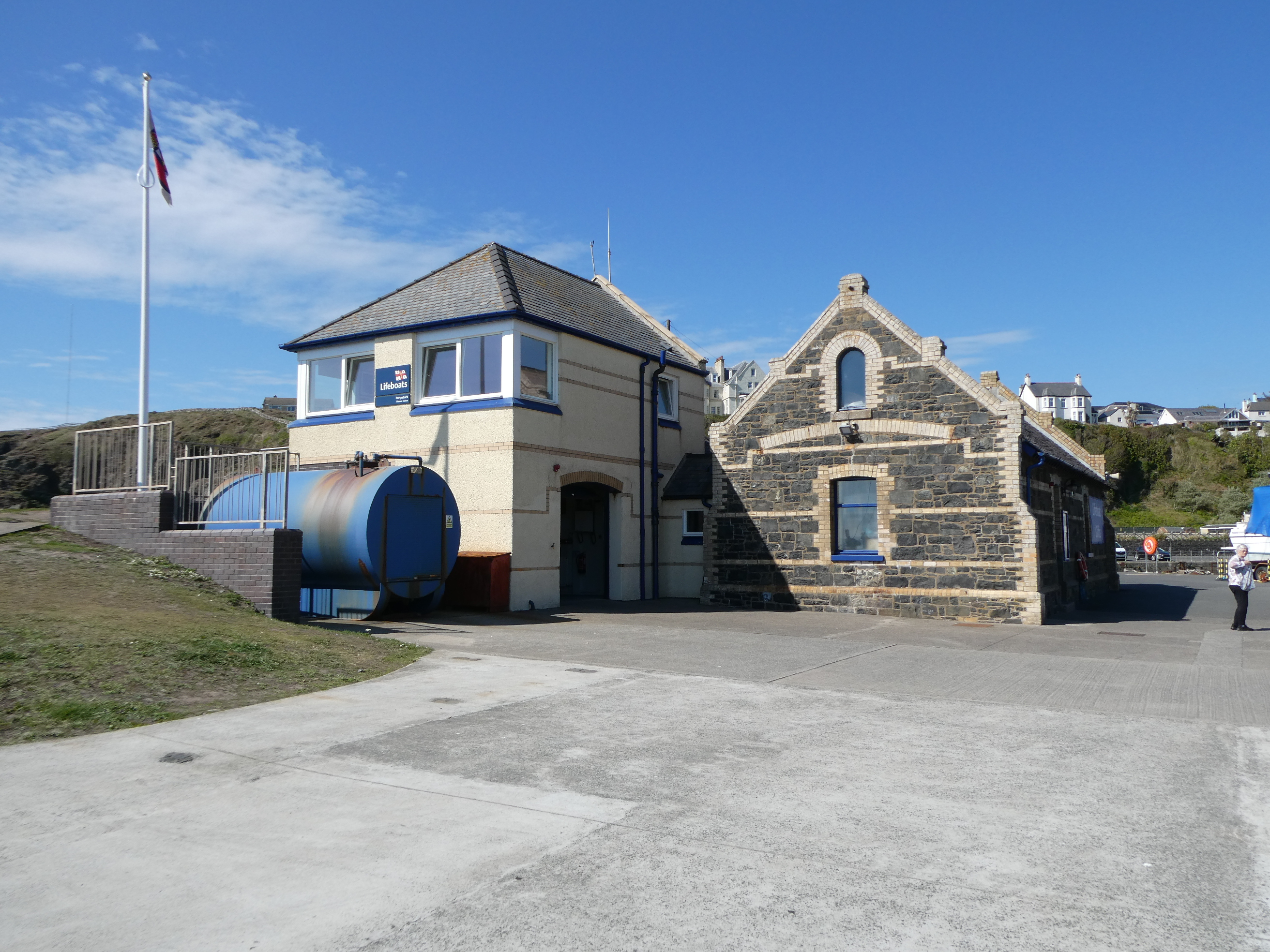
- Portpatrick Lifeboat Station in 2025

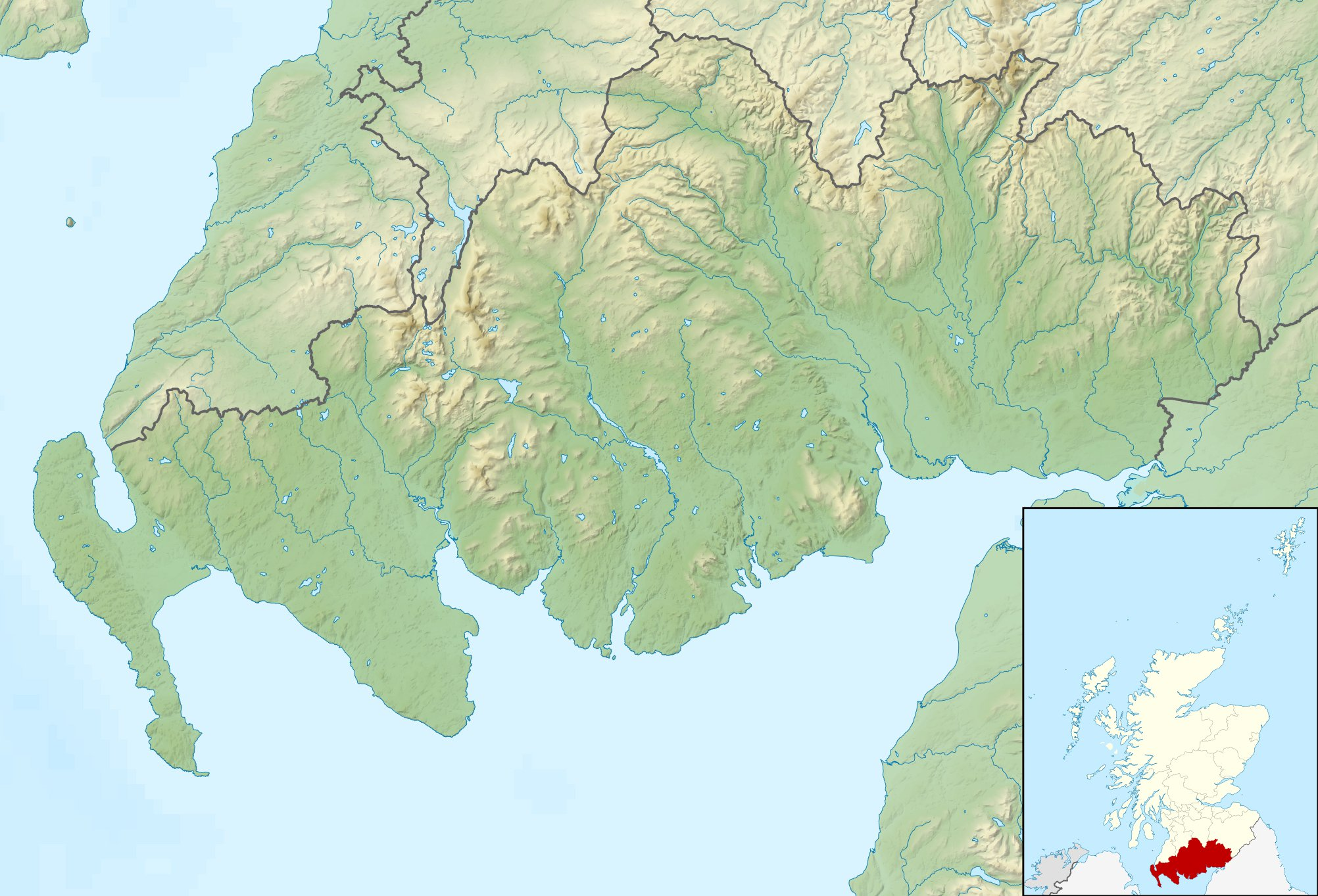
- Location within Dumfries and Galloway

General information
- Type: Lifeboat station
- Location: The Harbour, Portpatrick, Dumfries and Galloway, DG9 8AN, United Kingdom
- Coordinates: 54.841944°N 5.119889°W
- Opened: 1877; 149 years ago
- Cost: £280
- Owner: Royal National Lifeboat Institution

Website
- Portpatrick RNLI Lifeboat Station

Portpatrick Lifeboat Station can be found at the harbour in Portpatrick, a town 6.5 miles (10.5 km) west of Stranraer, sitting on the west coast of the Rhins of Galloway, a double-headed peninsula joined to the mainland by an isthmus, formerly in Wigtownshire, now in the administrative region of Dumfries and Galloway.

A lifeboat station was established at Portpatrick by the Royal National Lifeboat Institution (RNLI) in 1877.

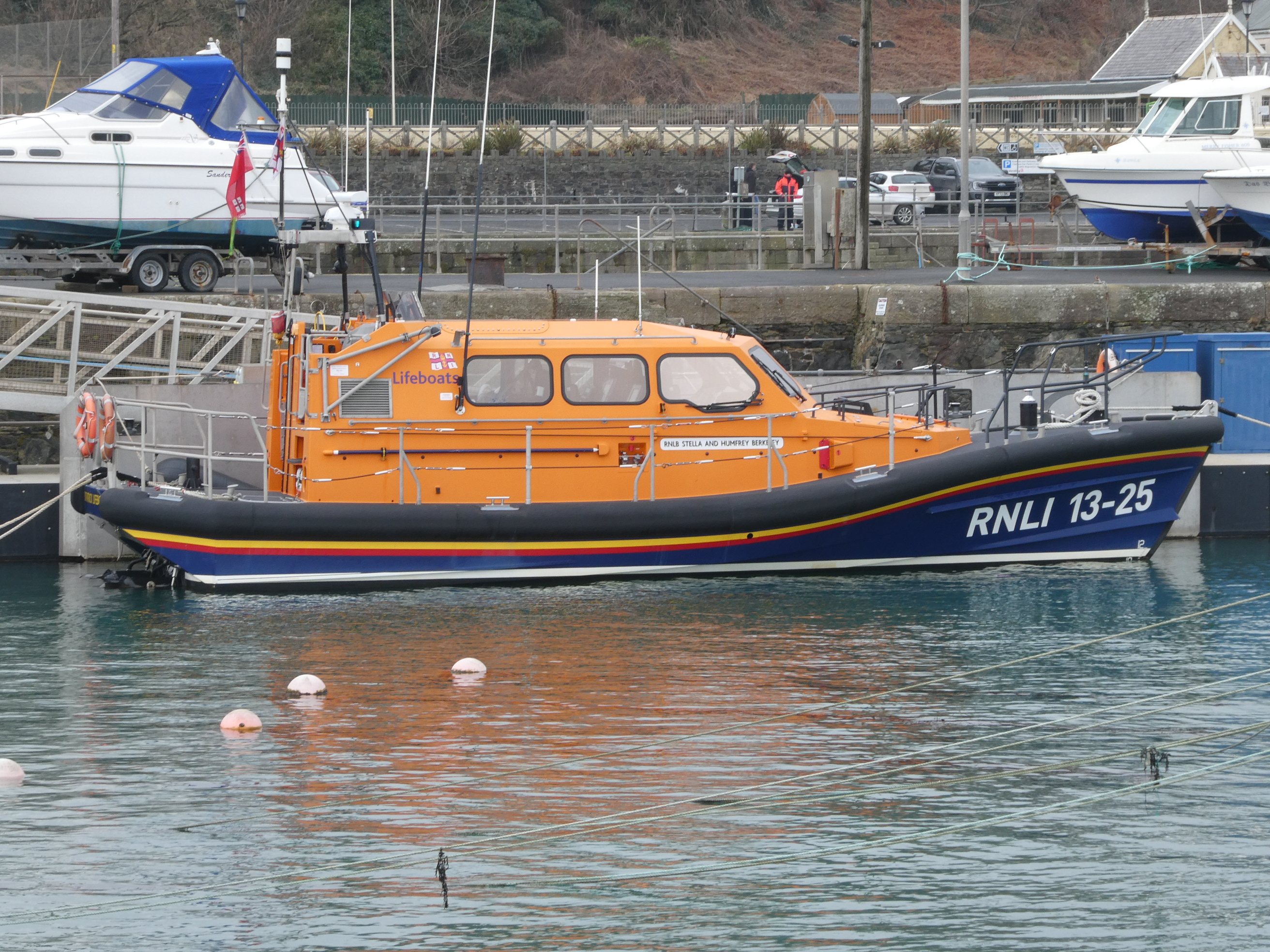
Shannon-class All-weather lifeboat 13-25 Stella and Humfrey Berkeley (ON 1332)

The station currently operates a Shannon-class All-weather lifeboat, 13-25 Stella and Humfrey Berkeley (ON 1332), on station since 2023.

== History ==
Lifeboat stations had been established to the south of Portpatrick at Port Logan in 1866, and to the north at Ballantrae in 1871. Following a petition from the local inhabitants, and on the advice of Lloyd's Agent, it was decided to place an additional lifeboat at Portpatrick...

...for the protection of the numerous vessels passing that port as well as for the benefit of the fishing-boats of the place when overtaken by sudden gales of wind.

— The Life-boat, vol. X, issue 107, page 220–221 1 February 1878

A boathouse was constructed at the harbour, at a cost of £280, and a large 37-foot-long (11 m) self-righting 'Pulling and Sailing' (P&S) lifeboat, one with sails and 12 oars, constructed by Woolfe of Shadwell, and costing £412, was dispatched to the town. The lifeboat was presented to the Institution by members of the Civil Service of the United Kingdom, via the Civil Service Lifeboat Fund, and the exertions of their Honorary Secretary, Mr Charles Dibdin, of the General Post Office. In 1885, Dibdin would take up the role of Secretary of the Institution. The lifeboat was the third boat provided by the Civil Service Lifeboat Fund, with the three boats stationed in Ireland, England and now Scotland.

The launch arrangements at Portpatrick were unusual, as instead of using a slipway, or beach launch with a carriage, the lifeboat would be lowered into the harbour by crane. At a ceremony on 15 December 1877, the lifeboat was named Civil Service No.3. After being tested at sea, the lifeboat was returned to the harbour, and capsized by means of the crane, successfully demonstrating its self-righting capabilities.

Disaster struck on 19 December 1899, when the lifeboat fell 14 feet (4.3 m), after the hook of the crane broke during launch. Such was the damage that the boat was withdrawn from service, and was broken up soon after being sold. A replacement lifeboat, Reserve No. 9 (ON 196), formerly May at Buddon Ness, was hastily dispatched to the station. A new boat, built by Thames Ironworks of Blackwall, London, arrived at the station in 1900, again taking the name Civil Service No. 3 (ON 437). In 1907, a new crane was installed, at a cost of £275.

The lifeboat was called out on 15 December 1913, to the SS Dunra. The vessel had been under tow from Ramsey, Isle of Man to Greenock when the line parted. With the boat's anchor dropped, the Portpatrick lifeboat managed to retrieve the engineer and mate, but the chains then parted. With great skill, the lifeboat was brought alongside the vessel as she headed for the rocks, receiving damage in the process, but rescuing the two remaining crew and master. For his skill in getting the lifeboat alongside the stricken steam ship, Coxswain James Smith Jr. was awarded the RNLI Silver Medal, and accorded 'The Thanks of the Institution inscribed on Vellum'.

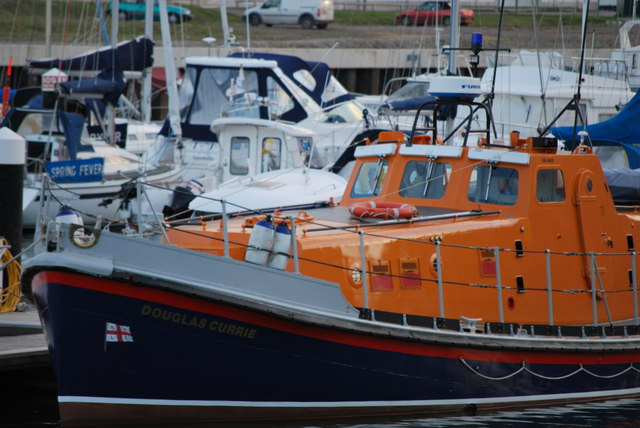
Portpatrick Solent-class lifeboat Douglas Currie (ON 1021)

The RNLI started to introduce petrol-engined motor lifeboats from 1909, but it would be 1922 before one was placed at Portpatrick. The lifeboat received was actually the Maria (ON 560), one of the first motor lifeboats in service, but the boat had already served thirteen years at Broughty Ferry.

Diesel engines were tried in the 1930s and Portpatrick was one of the stations selected for comparative trials of the new engines. It was found that their boat could cruise for 57 nautical miles (106 km) while using 64 imperial pints (36 L) of petrol but the Yarmouth lifeboat with a diesel engine achieved 118 nmi (219 km) with just 29 imp pt (16 L).

On 12 January 1932, the SS Camlough developed engine trouble near the Isle of Man. The captain decided to return to his home port, Belfast, but on the 13 January, the ship was blown towards the Scottish coast in gale force conditions. Another ship, the Moyalla, attempted to tow the Camlough, but the line kept breaking. The 40-foot 6in Watson-class Portpatrick lifeboat J. and W. (ON 722) launched at 20:45, and stood by to monitor the situation. When the tow broke for the seventh time, the Camlough dropped anchors, but they didn't hold and the vessel was swept towards the rocks. Veering down, the lifeboat got alongside, and managed to bring aboard the ten crew, including one man who fell into the sea between the lifeboat and the ship, but was hauled to safety by the coxswain, before he was crushed between the boats. Arriving back to port at 08:30, the lifeboat had been at sea for 12 hours, and travelled 70 miles (110 km). Coxswain, John Campbell was awarded the RNLI Bronze Medal for this service.

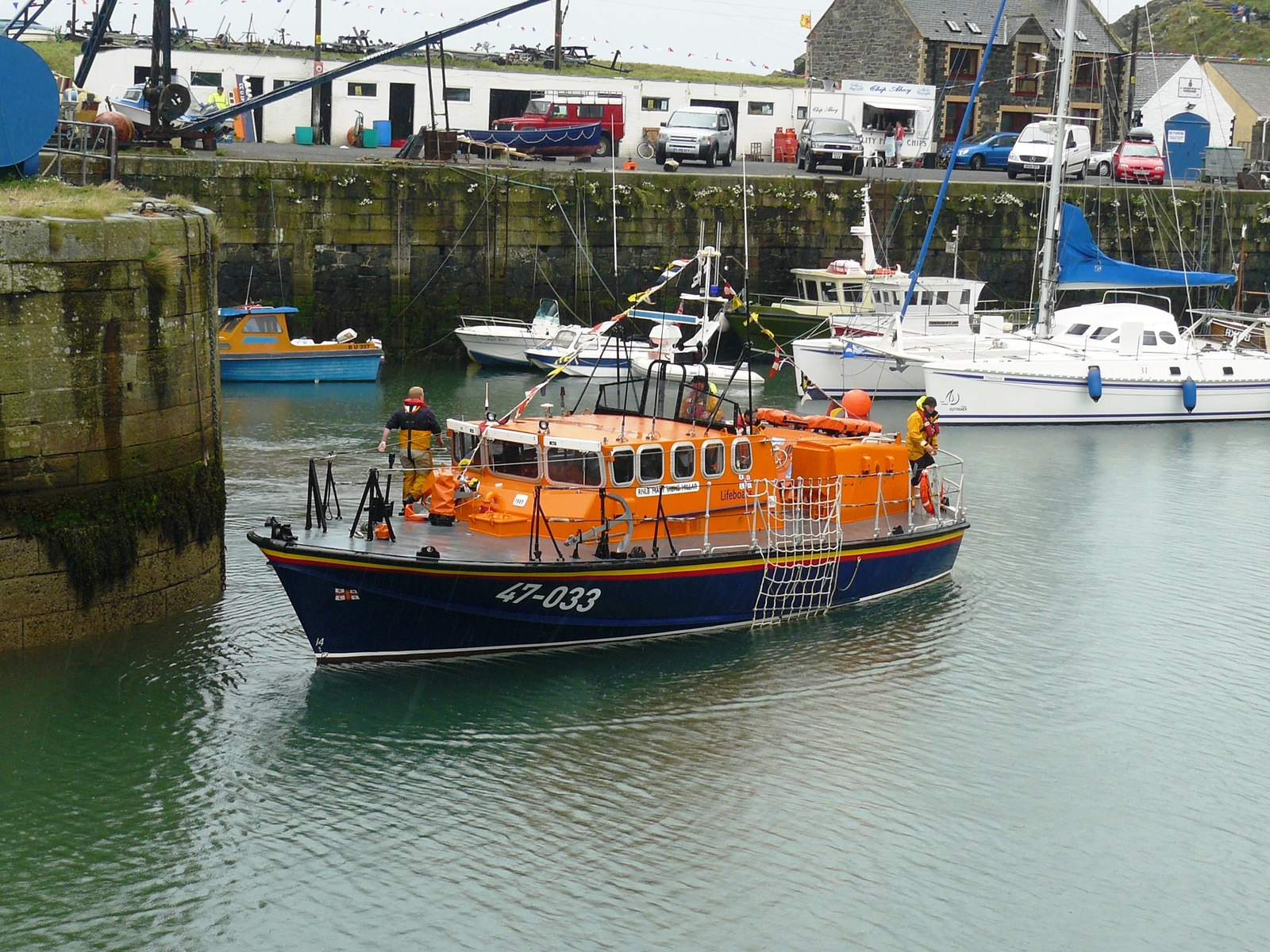
Tyne-class lifeboat 47-033 Mary Irene Millar (ON 1151)

After a succession of four Watson-class lifeboats, Portpatrick received the Solent-class lifeboat Douglas Currie (ON 1021), but she was at the end of her RNLI career, and served just three years at Portpatrick. The boat was replaced by the Tyne-class lifeboat, 47-033 Mary Irene Millar (ON 1151).

Construction of an extension to the boathouse commenced in 1992, providing a souvenir outlet, a galley, a general-purpose store and a lookout training room and improved crew facilities. The works were completed the following year.

A 'Collective Framed Letter of Thanks signed by the Chairman of the Institution' was awarded to the crew of Mary Irene Millar, for their teamwork, seamanship and determination, after the rescue of the three crew from the sinking fishing vessel Mourne Endeavour, in a Force 10 storm on 23 November 1995.

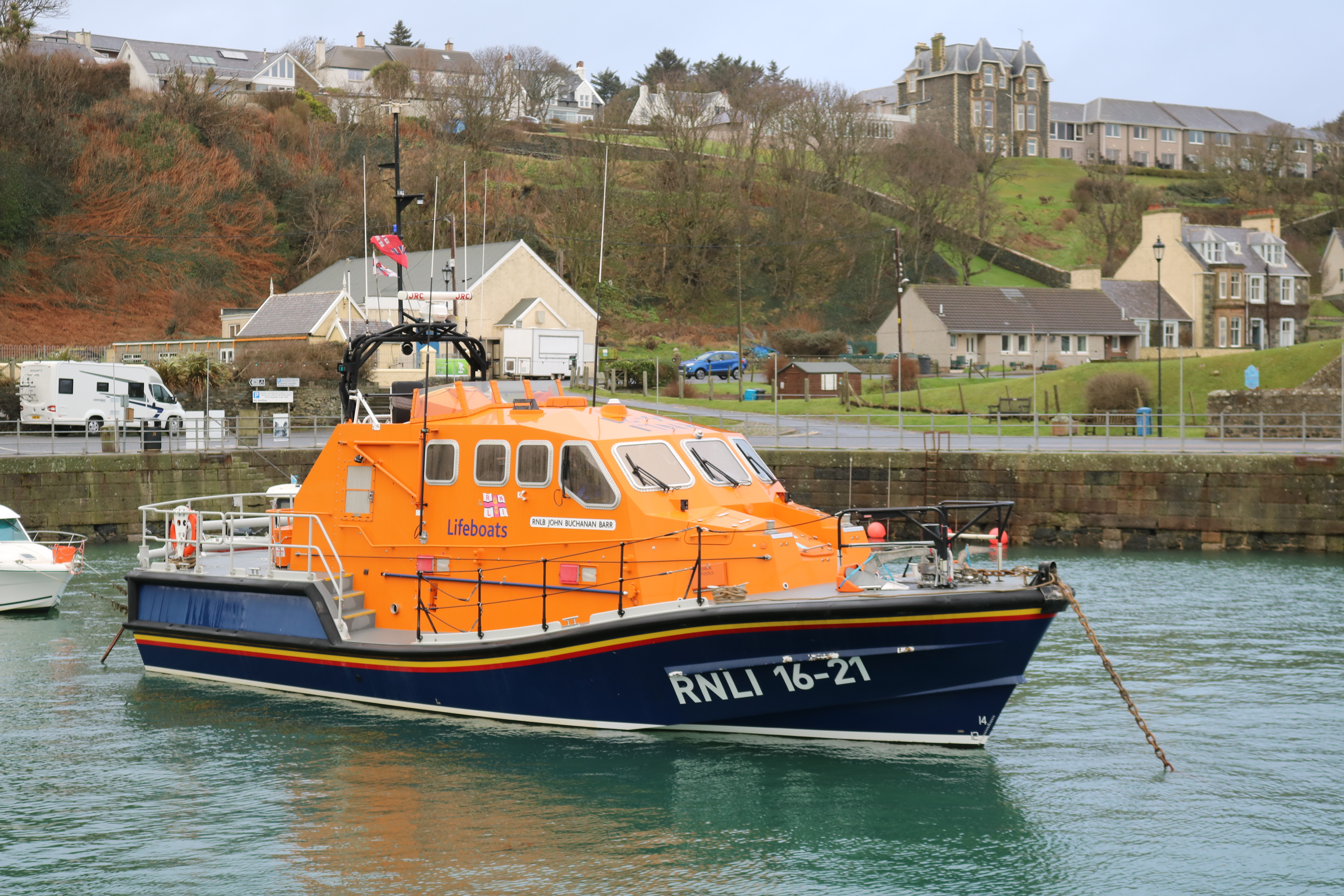
Tamar-class All-weather lifeboat 16-21 John Buchanan Barr (ON 1301)

Dr John Buchanan Barr, MBE, worked as a GP in Glasgow both before and after World War II, serving during the war with distinction with the Royal Army Medical Corps in North Africa, Sicily and Italy.

Many holidays were spent with his wife Catherine in Portpatrick, and following his death, the sum of £2.6m was received by the Institution from the bequest of Catherine Barr, for a lifeboat to be placed at Portpatrick, in memory of her late husband.

The Tamar-class All-weather lifeboat 16-21 John Buchanan Barr (ON 1301) was placed on service on 13 November 2011.

In 2023, due to operational requirements, it was decided to replace the Tamar-class with a Shannon-class All-weather lifeboat. 13-25 Stella and Humfrey Berkeley (ON 1332) had been mostly funded from the estate of RNLI supporters and joint governors Humfrey Ingram Berkeley and his late wife Stella, for the provision of a lifeboat on the west coast of Scotland. First launched in 2018, the lifeboat operated at Leverburgh until 2020, when it was placed in the Relief fleet, and Leverburgh were allocated a B-class (Atlantic 85). John Buchanan Barr was retained on station until training on the new boat was completed.

After undertaking a full refit, and a period in the Relief fleet, the Tamar-class lifeboat 16-21 John Buchanan Barr (ON 1301) was allocated to Fraserburgh in April 2026.

== Princess Victoria ==
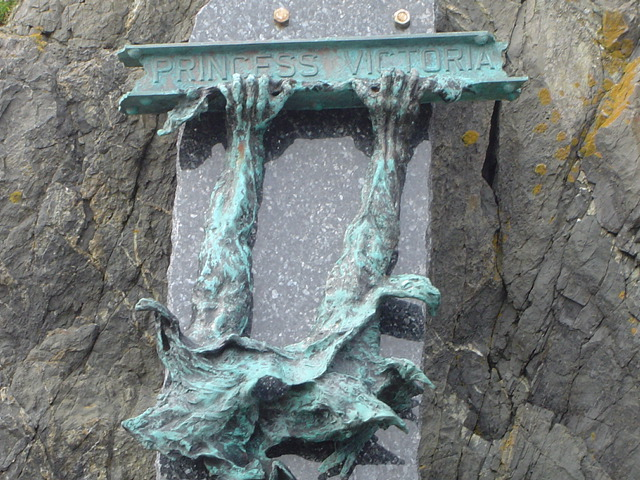
Memorial to the Princess Victoria

At 07:45 on the 31 January 1953, despite a gale warning in force, the stern-loading car ferry Princess Victoria left nearby Stranraer, on its regular crossing to Larne in Northern Ireland. A storm had been building and soon after leaving Loch Ryan, the stern doors were damaged by heavy waves, and the vessel started to take on water. When attempts to go astern and retreat back to Loch Ryan failed, the captain decided to make for Larne on a course sheltering the doors from the worst of the waves.

The Portpatrick 46-foot Watson lifeboat Jeannie Speirs (ON 788) was launched following the transmission of an SOS at 10:32 and was later joined by the lifeboats from Donaghadee, Cloughey and Newcastle. The order to abandon ship came at 14:00, but there was confusion about its precise location and the lifeboat did not reach the wreck until more than an hour later, by which time the storm had developed into a hurricane. The Portpatrick crew rescued two people and took them to Donaghadee. 31 were rescued by the Donaghadee lifeboat, which made multiple trips to the scene. When the ferry left Stranraer, there had been 127 passengers and 49 crew on board. 135 lives were lost, in what is regarded as one of the worst disasters in British coastal waters in the twentieth century. The Portpatrick lifeboat returned to her station on the afternoon of 1 February, more than a day after launching into the storm. Coxswain William McConnell was awarded the Medal of the Order of the British Empire, along with the RNLI Bronze Medal.

== Station honours ==
The following are awards made at Portpatrick:

- Medal of the Order of the British Empire
  William McConnell, Coxswain – 1953
- RNLI Silver Medal
  James Smith Jr., Coxswain – 1914
- RNLI Bronze Medal
  John Campbell, Coxswain – 1932
  William McConnell, Coxswain – 1953
- The Mrs G. M. Porter Award, for the bravest deed in 1953.
  William McConnell, Coxswain – 1953
- 'The Thanks of the Institution inscribed on Vellum'
  James Smith Jr., Coxswain – 1914
  James Mitchell, Mechanic – 1953
- 'A Collective Framed Letter of Thanks signed by the Chairman of the Institution'
  Robert Erskine, Coxswain/Mechanic – 1996
  Quinton Mckie, Second Coxswain – 1996
  Colin Atkinson, Assistant Mechanic – 1996
  Kevin Shuttleworth, crew member – 1996
  Calum Currie, crew member – 1996
  Cameron Ritchie, crew member – 1996
  Thomas Monteith, crew member – 1996
- Member, Order of the British Empire (MBE)
  Robert Erskine, Coxswain, For voluntary service to Maritime Safety – 2009QBH

== Portpatrick lifeboats ==
=== Pulling and Sailing (P&S) lifeboats ===
On station	ON (Note: ON is the RNLI's Official Number of the boat.)	Name	Built	Class	Comments
1877–1899	284	Civil Service No. 3	1877	37-foot self-righting (P&S)	(Note: 37 ft 0 in (11.28 m) x 8 ft 6 in (2.59 m) (12-oared) self-righting (P&S) lifeboat, gift of the Civil Service LB fund, built by Woolfe of Shadwell, London, costing £412.); Dismantled following damage, and sold locally in 1899.
1899–1900	196	Reserve No. 9	1888	37-foot self-righting (P&S)	(Note: 37 ft 0 in (11.28 m) x 8 ft 6 in (2.59 m) (12-oared) self-righting (P&S) lifeboat, anonymous gift of 'D', built by D. and W. Henderson and Company of Partick, costing £542.); Previously May at Buddon Ness. Transferred to Montrose.
1900–1922	437	Civil Service No. 3	1900	37-foot self-righting (P&S)	(Note: 37 ft 0 in (11.28 m) x 9 ft 3 in (2.82 m) (12-oared) self-righting (P&S) lifeboat, gift of the Civil Service LB fund, built by Thames Ironworks of Blackwall, London, costing £857.); Transferred to the Relief fleet. Later at Montrose.

=== Motor lifeboats ===
On station	ON	Op.No. (Note: Op.No. is the RNLI's Operational Number of the boat carried on the hull.)	Name	Built	Class	Comments
1922–1929	560	–	Maria	1909	40-foot Watson	Previously at Broughty Ferry. Transferred to Pwllheli.
1929–1937	722	–	J. and W.	1929	40-foot 6in Watson	Transferred to the Relief fleet. Later at Berwick-upon-Tweed.
1937–1961	788	–	Jeannie Speirs	1936	46-foot Watson	
1961–1986	957	–	The Jeannie	1961	47-foot Watson	
1986–1989	1021	48-016	Douglas Currie	1973	Solent	Relief fleet lifeboat. Previously at Kirkwall, Macduff and Fraserburgh. Transferred to Workington.
1989–2011	1151	47-033	Mary Irene Millar	1989	Tyne	Transferred to the Relief fleet.
2011–2024	1301	16-21	John Buchanan Barr	2011	Tamar	Assigned to Fraserburgh, April 2026
2023–	1332	13-25	Stella and Humfrey Berkeley	2018	Shannon	Previously at Leverburgh

More post-service details can be found on the respective lifeboat class pages.

== See also ==
- List of RNLI stations
- List of former RNLI stations
- Royal National Lifeboat Institution lifeboats
