= Stronsay Lifeboat Station =

Former RNLI lifeboat station in Orkney, Scotland

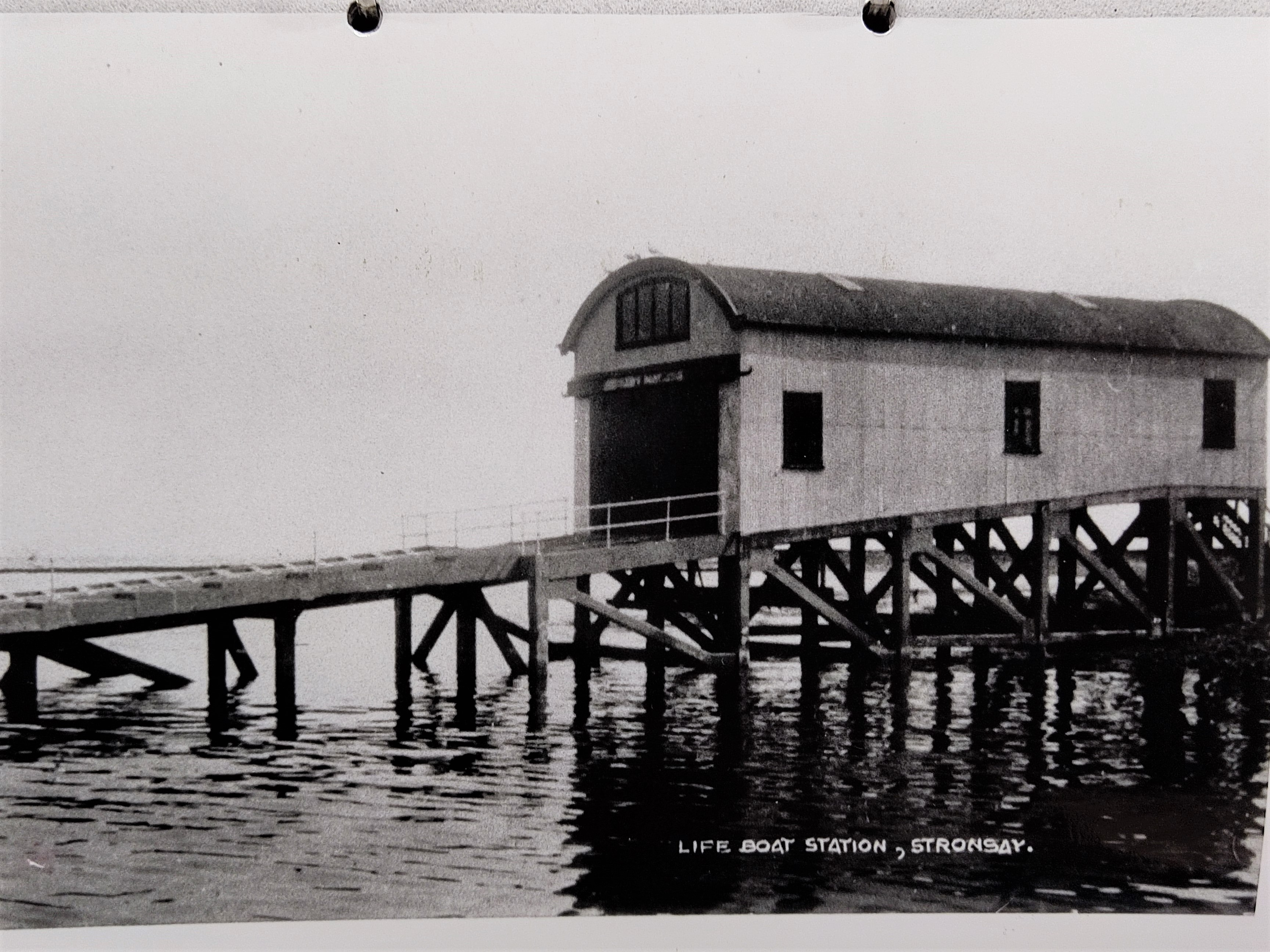
- 1912 Stronsay Lifeboat Station

- Stronsay, Orkney

General information
- Status: Closed
- Type: RNLI Lifeboat Station
- Location: Whitehall, Stronsay, Orkney, KW17 2AS, Scotland
- Coordinates: 59°08′36.5″N 2°34′57.7″W
- Opened: 1909, 1952
- Closed: 1915 (1920), 1972

Stronsay Lifeboat Station was located at Whitehall, a village on the north eastern tip of the island of Stronsay, one of the Orkney Islands, an archipelago off the north coast of mainland Scotland.

A lifeboat station was established on Stronsay in 1909, by the Royal National Lifeboat Institution (RNLI), but closed temporarily in 1915, and completely in 1920.

The station reopened in 1952, but after operating for a further 20 years, Stronsay Lifeboat Station closed in 1972.

== History ==
Following a special report by the Deputy Chief Inspector of Life-boats, on his visits to different parts of the coast of Scotland, as instructed by the RNLI committee of management, and read at their meeting on Tuesday 14 July 1904, it was resolved that Dornoch lifeboat station was to be closed, and a new station established, subject to further enquiries, at Papa Sound, Stronsay Island.

It would be nearly five years later, on Thursday 15 April 1909, when a flotilla of three lifeboats departed London Docks at 08:50, bound for three Scottish lifeboat stations, each type being the choice of the respective crew. The John A. Hay (ON 561), bound for Stromness, with the John Ryburn (ON 565) in tow, bound for Stronsay, were two of the first three purpose-built motor-powered RNLI lifeboats, each with a single engine, but still with sails.

The third, Sarah Austin (ON 585), in the tow of the Stronsay boat, and bound for Thurso, was a "traditional" 40-foot Watson-class 'Pulling and Sailing' (P&S) lifeboat, with sails and 12 oars. The three boats finally made Thurso 15 days later at 13:00 on Friday 30 April, after scheduled stops at several ports on the east coast, having endured a whole range of weather and sea conditions, and with the Stronsay boat needing a new engine bearing at Tynemouth.

After a 2-hour rest, both Orkney boats set out again, with the Stromness boat arriving home at 20:00. However, the Stronsay lifeboat was still having engine problems, and put back to Thurso for repairs. The RNLI reported that the John Ryburn departed the following day, and with a tow from the steamship SS St Ola, arrived at Stromness on 1 May, before heading to Stronsay, arriving home 17 days after departing London, although conflicting reports indicate that the boat remained in Thurso for 15 days awaiting parts, before heading home.

The official naming ceremony had been planned to be held on the trip home, but this was postponed due to the delays, and with consideration that the boat was already needing a repaint. On 28 September 1909, a naming ceremony was held at the Corn Slip at Kirkwall, in front of a large crowd. Funded from the bequest of the late William McCunn of Largs, the lifeboat, costing £2770-9s-5d, was named John Ryburn (ON 565), as per the request of the donor.

From the outset, the Stronsay lifeboat had been plagued with engine problems. By 7 October 1909, the boat was back at Kirkwall, having the engine repaired once again, when the Full-rigged ship Edenmore was wrecked on Papa Sound. The lifeboat was summoned back from Kirkwall, and was towed back to Stronsay without engine, by the Aberdeen Fishing trawler Ben Aden. Meanwhile, the Stronsay lifeboatmen set out in a local boat, and the 25 crew of the Edenmore, by now in the ship's boats, were assisted to the shore. A set of binoculars were awarded to Capt. James Merson of the Ben Aden for his efforts to assist.

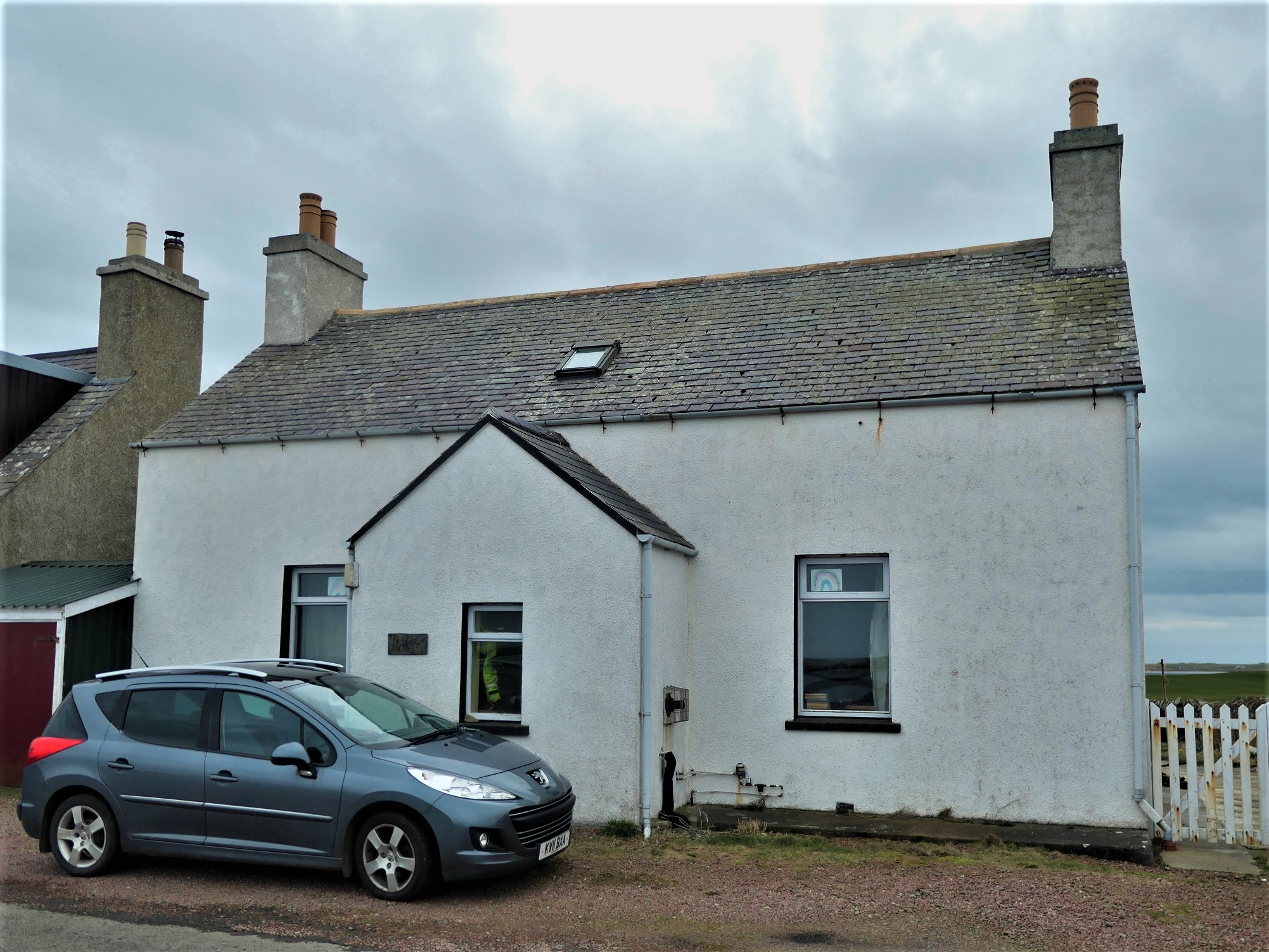
Ryburn Cottage

When the lifeboat first arrived at Stronsay, she had been moored afloat. In 1911, a concrete slipway was constructed with a boathouse on top, at a cost of £3050. Ryburn Cottage was constructed in 1912, to house the lifeboat mechanic, at a cost of £300.

In the early hours of 10 February 1912, the fishing boat Crimond of Aberdeen, with nine crew aboard, ran ashore on the Holms of Ire. Five crew attempted to get ashore in the ship's boat, but the boat capsized, and four of the five men were lost. The lifeboat set out, arriving with the casualty vessel two hours later, but then had to lay off until daybreak. With great skill, the lifeboat was brought alongside, and the remaining four crew were rescued.

Engine problems still persisted. In September 1913, the boat's engine was removed in Stromness, and the lifeboat returned to Stronsay, as a 'Pulling and Sailing' lifeboat. She returned to Stromness in May 1914 for a new 40-hp Tylor motor, costing £375, finally returning to Stronsay on 31 October 1914.

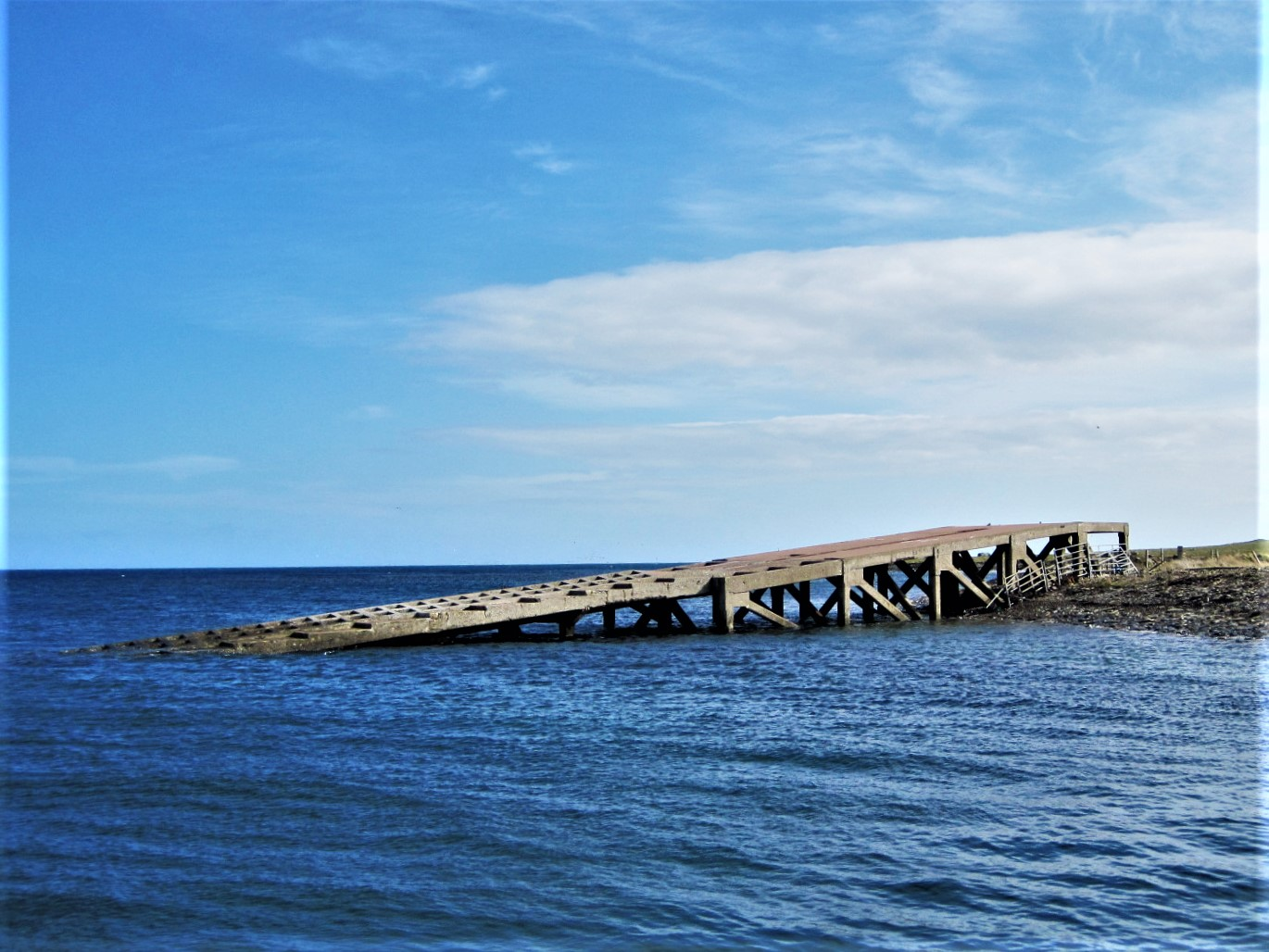
Remains of the Lifeboat Slipway, Stronsay

With all engine problems finally resolved, the outbreak of World War I would see the premature closure of Stronsay Lifeboat Station. Men were called away as the war progressed, and just six years after the arrival of the lifeboat, with too few men available to crew the lifeboat, the station was temporarily closed on 12 July 1915. The John Ryburn (ON 565) was transferred to Peterhead.

Even when the war ended, not enough men returned to Stronsay. There were still insufficient numbers to crew a lifeboat. The John Ryburn never returned, and was later transferred to Broughty Ferry. Stronsay lifeboat station was officially closed in 1920. The mechanic's accommodation, Ryburn cottage, was sold in 1937, and the lifeboat house was dismantled and sold in 1949. Only the concrete slipway remains to this day.

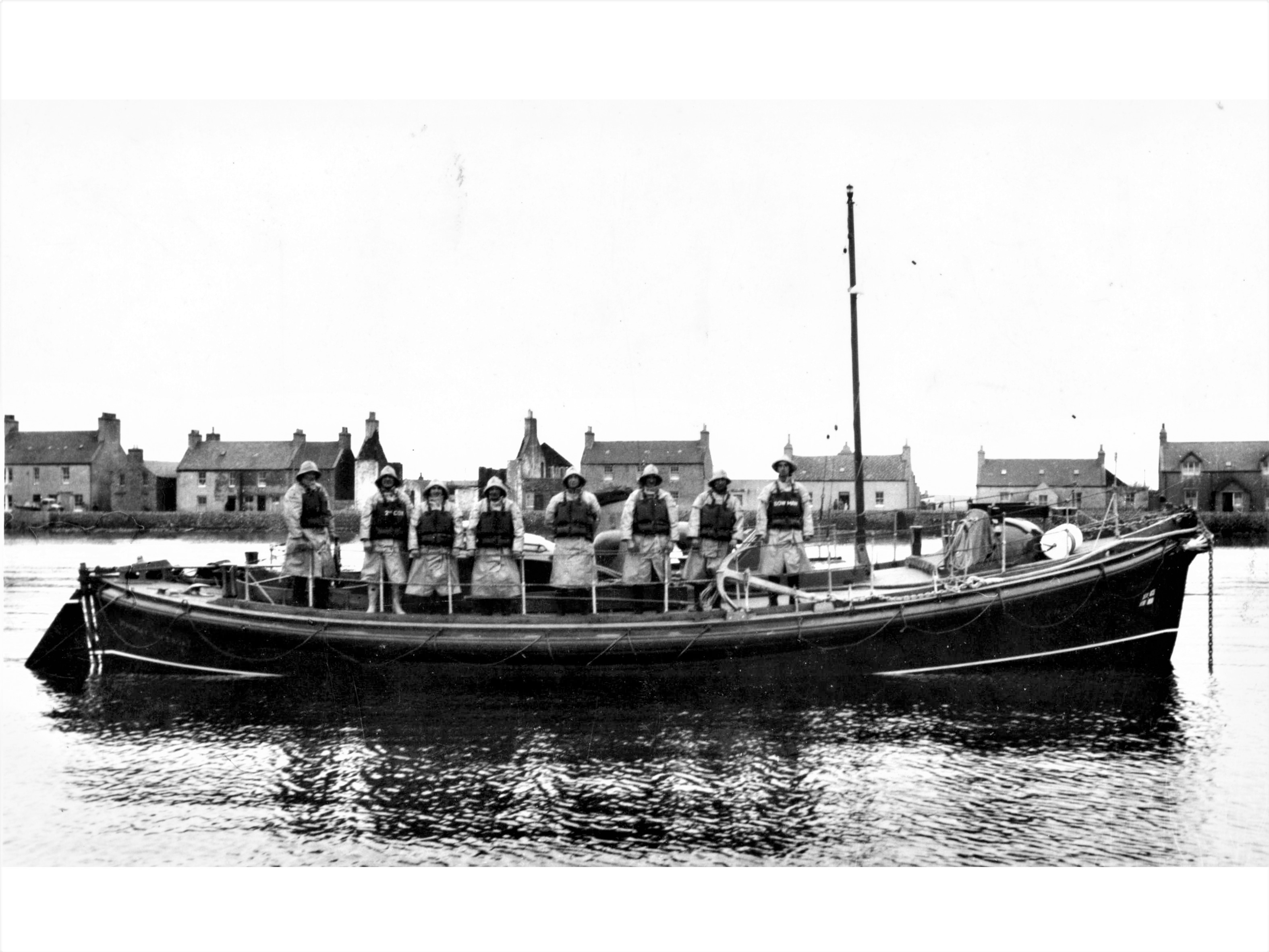
RNLB Edward Z Dresden (ON 707) at Stronsay Harbour

Finally, following a gap of over 20 years, and after the loss of several fishing boats, it was decided to re-establish the station at Stronsay. The 45-foot 6in Watson-class lifeboat Edward Z. Dresden (ON 707) was placed at Stronsay in 1952. Soon followed the larger 52-foot Barnett-class lifeboat John Gellatly Hyndman (ON 923) in 1955.

In the early hours of 16 September 1963, the 101 ton Fishing trawler Aberdeen City, with 13 crew, ran aground at Start Point, Sanday. Stronsay lifeboat John Gellatly Hyndman set out at 01:55, reaching the vessel at 03:15. With another trawler, St Giles, remaining on scene, nine crewmen were taken off, and landed soon afterwards at Kettletoft Pier. The lifeboat returned at 06:10, with the intentions of attempting to tow the boat off the rocks, but she was badly holed, with all compartments flooded. The remaining four crew were taken off, and landed at Kettletoft at 12:40. Arriving home at 14:00, the lifeboat had been at sea for over 12 hours.

In the 1960s, the RNLI ordered two 70-foot Clyde-class lifeboats, to evaluate the benefits of operating larger offshore vessels, which could remain at sea for many days without refuelling, and were able to cover some of the more exposed waters. The second of these boats, 70-002 Grace Paterson Ritchie (ON 988) was relocated in 1968, to cover the Orkney Isles during the week, and was berthed at Kirkwall harbour at weekends.

In 1972, a permanent station was established at Kirkwall, and Stronsay Lifeboat Station was closed once again. The lifeboat on station at the time of closure, John Gellatly Hyndman (ON 923), was transferred to the relief fleet, before being sold from service in 1985. The boat was last reported as the Sea Terra in Antigua in June 2024.

== Stronsay lifeboats ==
ON (Note: ON is the RNLI's Official Number of the boat.)	Name	Built	On Station	Class	Comments
565	John Ryburn	1908	1909−1915	43-foot Watson (motor)	(Note: 43-foot x 12-foot 6in Watson-class non-self-righting (motor) lifeboat, built by Thames Ironworks of Blackwall, London.)
Station Closed 1920–1952
707	Edward Z. Dresden	1929	1952−1955	45-foot 6in Watson	(Note: 45-foot 6in Watson-class non-self-righting lifeboat, built by S. E. Saunders of Cowes.)
923	John Gellatly Hyndman	1955	1955−1972	52-foot Barnett (Mk.I)	(Note: 52-foot Barnett-class lifeboat, built by J. Samuel White of Cowes.)

Station Closed 1972

== See also ==
- List of RNLI stations
- List of former RNLI stations
- Royal National Lifeboat Institution lifeboats
