= Watson-class lifeboat =

Former RNLI lifeboat class

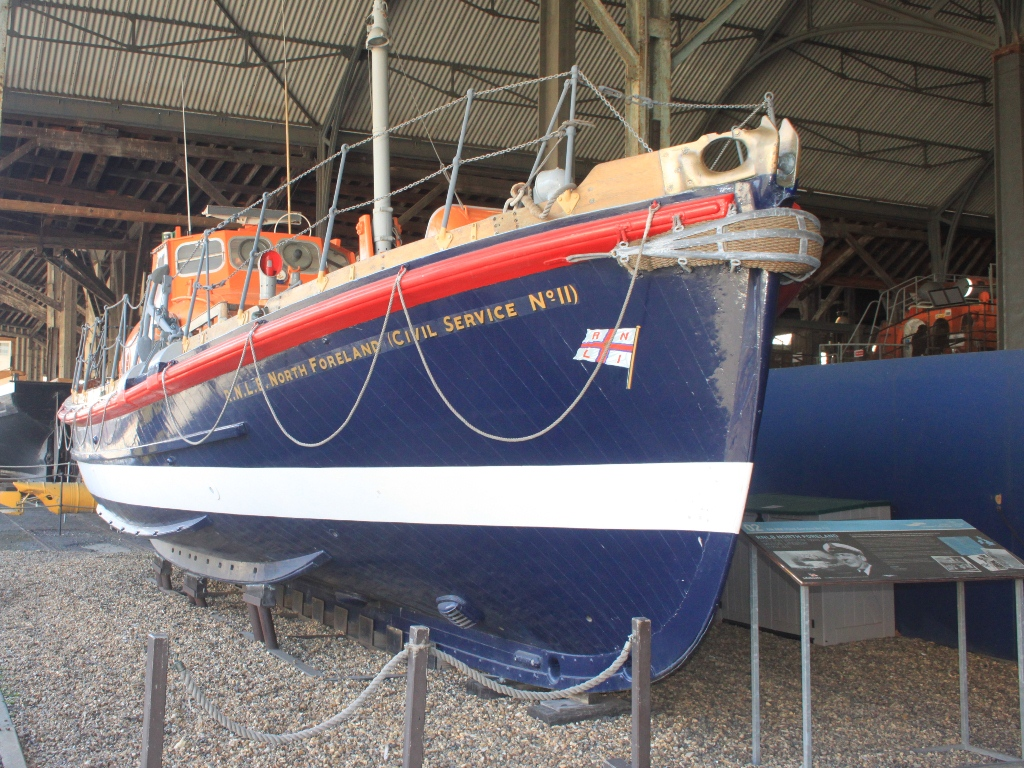
- 46ft 9in Watson-class RNLB North Foreland (Civil Service No.11) (ON 888) in the RNLI Heritage Collection at Chatham Historic Dockyard.

Class overview
- Builders: Thames Ironworks and Shipbuilding Company Blackwall, London; Summers & Payne, Southampton; S. E. Saunders Cowes; J. Samuel White Cowes
- Operators: Royal National Lifeboat Institution
- Preceded by: Watson-class P&S lifeboat
- Succeeded by: Various
- Built: 1908–1963
- In service: 1909–1991
- Completed: 156
- Retired: 156

The Watson-class lifeboat is a design of non-self-righting lifeboat, operated by the Royal National Lifeboat Institution (RNLI) around the coasts of the United Kingdom and Ireland between 1888 and 1991. There were several variations over the years but all the boats had hulls that conformed to a design by George Lennox Watson, the RNLI's naval architect from 1887 until his death in 1904.

== History ==
The majority of lifeboats in service with the RNLI during the second half of the nineteenth century were of the Self-Righting type, designed to operate in rough seas close to the shore. Usually, the boat would have a heavy iron keel, and strategically fitted buoyancy aids, which would bring the boat upright following a capsize.

Some stations, which required a better sea-going boat, preferred the greater stability of a non-self-righting boat, such as the Norfolk and Suffolk class of lifeboat. This was especially relevant to those operating in shallow conditions, where a capsized boat might get caught on the sea-bottom and not self-right. Following the Southport and St Anne's lifeboats disaster in 1886, George Lennox Watson designed a new non-self-righting hull shape for the RNLI, which was first used for the construction of the pulling and sailing lifeboat Edith and Annie (ON 208), built in 1888. A further 42 pulling and sailing lifeboats were built to Watson's design, the last built in 1915, some 11 years after his death.

== Motor lifeboats ==
The RNLI began trials with motor lifeboats in 1903, when a standard 38-foot-long (12 m) self-righting (P&S) lifeboat, J. McConnell Hussey (ON 343), was fitted with an 11-hp Fay and Bowen engine. In 1906, two further self-righting lifeboats of 37 ft (11 m) and 43 ft (13 m), and a 43 ft (13 m) non-self-righting Norfolk and Suffolk-class, were fitted with engines of varying size and manufacturer.

In 1908, the RNLI commissioned production of motor-powered Watson-class lifeboats. The first was the 43-foot-long (13 m) John Ryburn (ON 565), which was assigned to Stronsay in the Orkney Islands. The boat would be one of the first two lifeboats, the other being John Hay (ON 561), a self-righting single engine lifeboat bound for Stromness, to travel to their new stations under their own power, both departing London Docks at 08:50 on 15 April 1909. Even though motor-power was now being employed, the two boats towed a brand-new traditional pulling and sailing (P&S) lifeboat to its new station at Thurso.

The journey wasn't without its problems, with the John Ryburn needing a new engine bearing at Tynemouth, further work at Thurso, and being delayed so much, as to miss her intended naming ceremony date. By October 1909, the boat was back in Kirkwall for more engine work, and problems were only finally resolved, when a new engine was fitted in 1914.

== Fleet ==
=== 38ft, 40ft and 43ft Watson motor lifeboats ===
The first Watson motor lifeboats were based on the most common pulling and sailing hulls, the 38 ft, 40 ft and 43 ft types. Apart from the addition of an engine and propeller, there was little to distinguish them from their sail- and oar-powered predecessors. The engines in the early motor types were regarded almost as an auxiliary and the boats, which had an open deck with end boxes, retained sails and oars. Engines from Tylor, Blake and Wolseley were used, although the Tylor was the most satisfactory and the two Blake-engined boats were re-engined with Tylors in 1914. Power output of the Tylors was 40 bhp which gave a speed of around seven knots.

ON (Note: ON is the RNLI's Official Number of the boat.)	Name	Built	In service	Stations	Length	Comments
565	John Ryburn	1908	1909–1915	Stronsay	43 ft 0 in (13.11 m)	(Note: 43 ft 0 in (13.11 m) x 12 ft 6 in (3.81 m) lifeboat, legacy of Mr McCunn, built by Thames Ironworks of Blackwall, London, with a single 40-hp Blake petrol engine, costing £3,183. Re-engined 40-hp Tylor, 1914.) Sold February 1935. Renamed Vigilant, later Bembo. Yacht at Caernarfon in 2003, reported derelict 2011, acquired by Thames Ironworks Heritage Trust for restoration as John Ryburn in 2013, but broken up in 2015 at Cody Dock, Canning Town, where the bow section remains, Sept 2025.
565	John Ryburn	1908	1915–1920	Peterhead No.2	43 ft 0 in (13.11 m)	Sold February 1935. Renamed Vigilant, later Bembo. Yacht at Caernarfon in 2003, reported derelict 2011, acquired by Thames Ironworks Heritage Trust for restoration as John Ryburn in 2013, but broken up in 2015 at Cody Dock, Canning Town, where the bow section remains, Sept 2025.
565	John Ryburn	1908	1921–1935	Broughty Ferry	43 ft 0 in (13.11 m)	Sold February 1935. Renamed Vigilant, later Bembo. Yacht at Caernarfon in 2003, reported derelict 2011, acquired by Thames Ironworks Heritage Trust for restoration as John Ryburn in 2013, but broken up in 2015 at Cody Dock, Canning Town, where the bow section remains, Sept 2025.
560	Maria	1909	1910–1921	Broughty Ferry	40 ft 0 in (12.19 m)	(Note: 40 ft 0 in (12.19 m) x 11 ft 0 in (3.35 m) lifeboat, gift of Miss M. Clarke, built by Thames Ironworks of Blackwall, London, with a single 40-hp Tylor petrol engine, costing £2,345.) Sold in 1932.
560	Maria	1909	1922–1929	Portpatrick	40 ft 0 in (12.19 m)	Sold in 1932.
560	Maria	1909	1930–1931	Pwllheli	40 ft 0 in (12.19 m)	Sold in 1932.
560	Maria	1909	1931	Shoreham Harbour	40 ft 0 in (12.19 m)	Sold in 1932.
595	William and Laura	1910	1910–1932	Donaghadee	43 ft 0 in (13.11 m)	(Note: 43 ft 0 in (13.11 m) x 12 ft 6 in (3.81 m) lifeboat, legacy of Miss A. W. Clarke-Hall, built by Thames Ironworks of Blackwall, London, with a single 40-hp Blake petrol engine, costing £4,508. Re-engined 40-hp Tylor, 1914.) Sold in 1935. Renamed Libo. Last reported in Barnstaple in the 1940s.
595	William and Laura	1910	1932–1935	Arranmore	43 ft 0 in (13.11 m)	Sold in 1935. Renamed Libo. Last reported in Barnstaple in the 1940s.
602	Elliot Galer	1910	1911–1936	Seaham	38 ft 0 in (11.58 m)	(Note: 38 ft 0 in (11.58 m) x 10 ft 0 in (3.05 m) lifeboat, legacy of Mr E. Galer, built by Thames Ironworks of Blackwall, London, with a single 34-hp Wolseley petrol engine, costing £3,564.) Sold in 1936. Renamed Quest. Wrecked on passage to Milford Haven in the 1980s.
603	Helen Smitton	1910	1911–1936	St Abbs	38 ft 0 in (11.58 m)	(Note: 38 ft 0 in (11.58 m) x 10 ft 0 in (3.05 m) lifeboat, legacy of Mr Hodge and his legatees, built by Thames Ironworks of Blackwall, London, with a single 34-hp Wolseley petrol engine, costing £3,563.) Sold in 1936. Renamed Paloma. Under restoration as Helen Smitton at Milford Haven, December 2024.
620	William MacPherson	1912	1912–1929	Campbeltown	43 ft 0 in (13.11 m)	(Note: 43 ft 0 in (13.11 m) x 12 ft 6 in (3.81 m) lifeboat, gift of Mrs MacPherson, built by Thames Ironworks of Blackwall, London, with a single 60-hp Tylor petrol engine, costing £3,423.) Sold September 1940. Renamed Carn Ingli. Broken up at Marsaxlokk, Malta, November 1999.
620	William MacPherson	1912	1930	Aldeburgh No.2	43 ft 0 in (13.11 m)	Sold September 1940. Renamed Carn Ingli. Broken up at Marsaxlokk, Malta, November 1999.
620	William MacPherson	1912	1931–1940	Pwllheli	43 ft 0 in (13.11 m)	Sold September 1940. Renamed Carn Ingli. Broken up at Marsaxlokk, Malta, November 1999.
621	Frederick Kitchen	1913	1914–1945	Beaumaris	43 ft 0 in (13.11 m)	(Note: 43 ft 0 in (13.11 m) x 12 ft 6 in (3.81 m) lifeboat, legacy of Mr F. Kitchen, built by Thames Ironworks of Blackwall, London, with a single 60-hp Tylor petrol engine, costing £3,727. Shelter added, 1928.) Sold 1948. Renamed Lady Pat, Jackie Maxwell, Herring Queen and Ballyheo Dream. Hull to be used as a canopy at the Heritage Pavilion, Cody Dock, Canning Town, December 2025.
621	Frederick Kitchen	1913	1945–1948	Relief fleet	43 ft 0 in (13.11 m)	Sold 1948. Renamed Lady Pat, Jackie Maxwell, Herring Queen and Ballyheo Dream. Hull to be used as a canopy at the Heritage Pavilion, Cody Dock, Canning Town, December 2025.
622	Alexander Tulloch	1912	1912–1914	Peterhead No.2	43 ft 0 in (13.11 m)	(Note: 43 ft 0 in (13.11 m) x 12 ft 6 in (3.81 m) lifeboat, legacy of Miss J. Tulloch, built by Thames Ironworks of Blackwall, London, with a single 60-hp Tylor petrol engine, costing £3,437.); Wrecked on service with three crew lost, 26 December 1914.
651	Samuel Oakes	1918	1919–1923	Humber	40 ft 0 in (12.19 m)	(Note: 40 ft 0 in (12.19 m) x 11 ft 0 in (3.35 m) lifeboat, legacy of Mrs Laing, part built by Summers and Payne of Southampton, completed by S. E. Saunders of Cowes, with a single 40-hp Tylor petrol engine, costing £7,156.) Sold January 1933. Renamed Esmee, later Grey Gull. Destroyed by fire at Rochester, Kent, 1980.
651	Samuel Oakes	1918	1924–1929	Weymouth	40 ft 0 in (12.19 m)	Sold January 1933. Renamed Esmee, later Grey Gull. Destroyed by fire at Rochester, Kent, 1980.
651	Samuel Oakes	1918	1929–1933	Shoreham Harbour	40 ft 0 in (12.19 m)	Sold January 1933. Renamed Esmee, later Grey Gull. Destroyed by fire at Rochester, Kent, 1980.
677	Prince David	1922	1922–1937	Barry Dock	40 ft 0 in (12.19 m)	(Note: 40 ft 0 in (12.19 m) x 11 ft 0 in (3.35 m) lifeboat, gift of the Welsh LB fund, built by J. Samuel White of Cowes, with a single 45-hp Tylor petrol engine, costing £8,019.) Sold December 1937.
681	K. B. M.	1922	1922–1949	Buckie	40 ft 0 in (12.19 m)	(Note: 40 ft 0 in (12.19 m) x 11 ft 0 in (3.35 m) lifeboat, legacies of Mr Kirkhope, Mr Baily and Miss McInroy, built by J. Samuel White of Cowes, with a single 45-hp Tylor petrol engine, costing £8,119.) Sold September 1952. Renamed Herbert Charles and Striker. Last reported under restoration as K. B. M. at Galway, November 2013.
681	K. B. M.	1922	1949–1952	Relief fleet	40 ft 0 in (12.19 m)	Sold September 1952. Renamed Herbert Charles and Striker. Last reported under restoration as K. B. M. at Galway, November 2013.

=== 45ft Watson motor lifeboats ===
The first standard class of Watson motor lifeboat was the 45ft Watson-class lifeboat. This began with the conversion in 1912 of Albert Edward (ON 463), a pulling and sailing lifeboat. Production began after World War I in 1919, continuing through to 1925. 22 boats were constructed, in service between 1912 and 1956, with Official Numbers in the range 463 to 695.

=== 45ft 6in Watson motor lifeboats ===
A new design appeared in 1926, marking the transition from single-engine to twin-engine layout. The first two 45ft 6in Watson-class lifeboats were single motor, but the remainder were twin-engined. 23 boats were built between 1926 and 1935, with Official Numbers in the range 698 to 775.

=== 40ft 6in Watson motor lifeboats ===
A small series of 40 ft 6 in (12.34 m) single-engine boats were built in 1929, the precursor of the twin engine 41 ft type of 1933, with an 11 ft 8 in (3.56 m) beam, 6 in (15 cm) narrower than the later boats. The boats resembled scaled down versions of the contemporary 45 ft 6 in design, with a small shelter ahead of the aft cockpit, and the exhaust funnel in front of it. All were built by J. Samuel White at Cowes, and were powered by a 50-bhp Weyburn CE4 4-cylinder petrol engine, driving a single propeller. They served until the mid-1950s.

ON (Note: ON is the RNLI's Official Number of the boat.)	Name	Built	In service	Stations	Comments
721	Lady Kylsant	1929	1929–1930	Weymouth	(Note: 40 ft 6 in (12.34 m) x 11 ft 8 in (3.56 m) lifeboat, gift of the Royal Mail and the Union Castle Steamship Co., built by J. Samuel White of Cowes, with a single 50-hp Weyburn CE4 4-cyl. petrol engine, costing £5,865.) Sold in 1956. Renamed Kylsant. Broken up at Peel, Isle of Man, March 2003.
721	Lady Kylsant	1929	1930–1937	Howth	Sold in 1956. Renamed Kylsant. Broken up at Peel, Isle of Man, March 2003.
721	Lady Kylsant	1929	1937–1956	Wicklow	Sold in 1956. Renamed Kylsant. Broken up at Peel, Isle of Man, March 2003.
722	J. and W.	1929	1929–1937	Portpatrick	(Note: 40 ft 6 in (12.34 m) x 11 ft 8 in (3.56 m) lifeboat, legacies of Mrs Calquhoun and Mrs Ashton, built by J. Samuel White of Cowes, with a single 50-hp Weyburn CE4 4-cyl. petrol engine, costing £6,052.) Sold May 1957. Renamed LL68 and Amethyst. Last reported under restoration as J. and W. at Ancroft near Berwick-upon-Tweed, October 2018.
722	J. and W.	1929	1937–1940	Relief fleet	Sold May 1957. Renamed LL68 and Amethyst. Last reported under restoration as J. and W. at Ancroft near Berwick-upon-Tweed, October 2018.
722	J. and W.	1929	1940–1957	Berwick-upon-Tweed	Sold May 1957. Renamed LL68 and Amethyst. Last reported under restoration as J. and W. at Ancroft near Berwick-upon-Tweed, October 2018.
723	Sir David Richmond of Glasgow	1929	1929–1955	Troon	(Note: 40 ft 6 in (12.34 m) x 11 ft 8 in (3.56 m) lifeboat, legacy of Lady Richmond and gift of Mrs Fairlie, built by J. Samuel White of Cowes, with a single 50-hp Weyburn CE4 4-cyl. petrol engine, costing £5,878.) Sold June 1956. Renamed Aber Girl (AB 52). Last reported as a fishing boat at Aberystwyth, June 1973.
724	G. W.	1929	1930–1956	Moelfre	(Note: 40 ft 6 in (12.34 m) x 11 ft 8 in (3.56 m) lifeboat, legacies of Dr. Richards and Mrs Scott, and gift from Northampton LB fund, built by J. Samuel White of Cowes, with a single 50-hp Weyburn CE4 4-cyl. petrol engine, costing £5,886.) Sold May 1956. Renamed Storm Siren. Under restoration as G. W. at Donaghadee, December 2025.

=== 41ft Watson motor lifeboats ===
The 41ft Watson-class lifeboat was the first of the twin-engined medium-sized boats, intended for stations unable to accommodate the larger types. A total of nine were built between 1932 and 1939, with a further four constructed between 1948 and 1952. The 13 lifeboats were in service from 1933 until 1978 (Cloughey-Portavogie, with two continuing in the Relief fleet until 1981/82. Official Numbers are in the range 751 to 897.

=== 46ft Watson motor lifeboats ===
1936 saw the next development of the large Watson, the 46ft Watson-class lifeboat, which saw the introduction of diesel engines, following advancements in lightweight units. 4 of the first 5 had petrol engines, but the fourth was given the new build diesel-engines, and this led the way for the remaining boats. 28 lifeboats were built, not including two which were destroyed whilst under construction, in an air raid on the Groves & Guttridge yard at Cowes in 1942. Four were constructed with a shallow draft, specific to the local requirements. Production continued until 1946, with the one at Fowey being withdrawn in 1981. Official Numbers are in the range 777 to 848.

=== 46ft 9in Watson motor lifeboats ===
The 46ft 9in Watson-class lifeboat was the first post World War II new design Watson lifeboat, built in 1947. The first 5 resembled the pre-war 46 ft type, but from 1948, a major redesign resulted in a new superstructure, with midships steering and a large aft cabin. 28 were built between 1947 and 1956. Greater London II (Civil Service No.30) was withdrawn from Beaumaris in 1989. Official Numbers in the range 849 to 932.

=== 42ft Watson motor lifeboats ===
A new 42ft Watson-class lifeboat in 1954 was intended for stations unable to accommodate larger types but needing something bigger than a carriage launched type, and replaced the 41 ft design dating from 1933. Three were constructed as a 'Beach version', with a stronger heavier hull. This design introduced the use of commercial diesel engines rather than the RNLI's own designs. 10 lifeboats were built between 1954 and 1962, the last on station being J. W. Archer (ON 933) at Wicklow. Official Numbers in the range 907 to 967.

=== 47ft Watson motor lifeboats ===
The final incarnation of the design, the 47ft Watson-class of 1955, was the last non self-righting class built for the RNLI, other than the three 70 ft (21 m) Clyde-class cruising boats in 1965 and 1974. These Watsons were the first lifeboats to have an enclosed wheelhouse (other than the unique Sir William Hillary lifeboat of 1929). 18 boats were built, the first in 1955, with full production between 1957 and 1963. The Robert (ON 955) was withdrawn from service at Beaumaris in 1991. Official Numbers in the range 920 to 971.

Over the 55 years between 1908 and 1963, 156 boats of various designs were built based on Watson's hull design.

== See also ==
- Watson-class P&S lifeboat
- Royal National Lifeboat Institution lifeboats
