= Girvan Lifeboat Station =

RNLI lifeboat station in South Ayrshire, Scotland

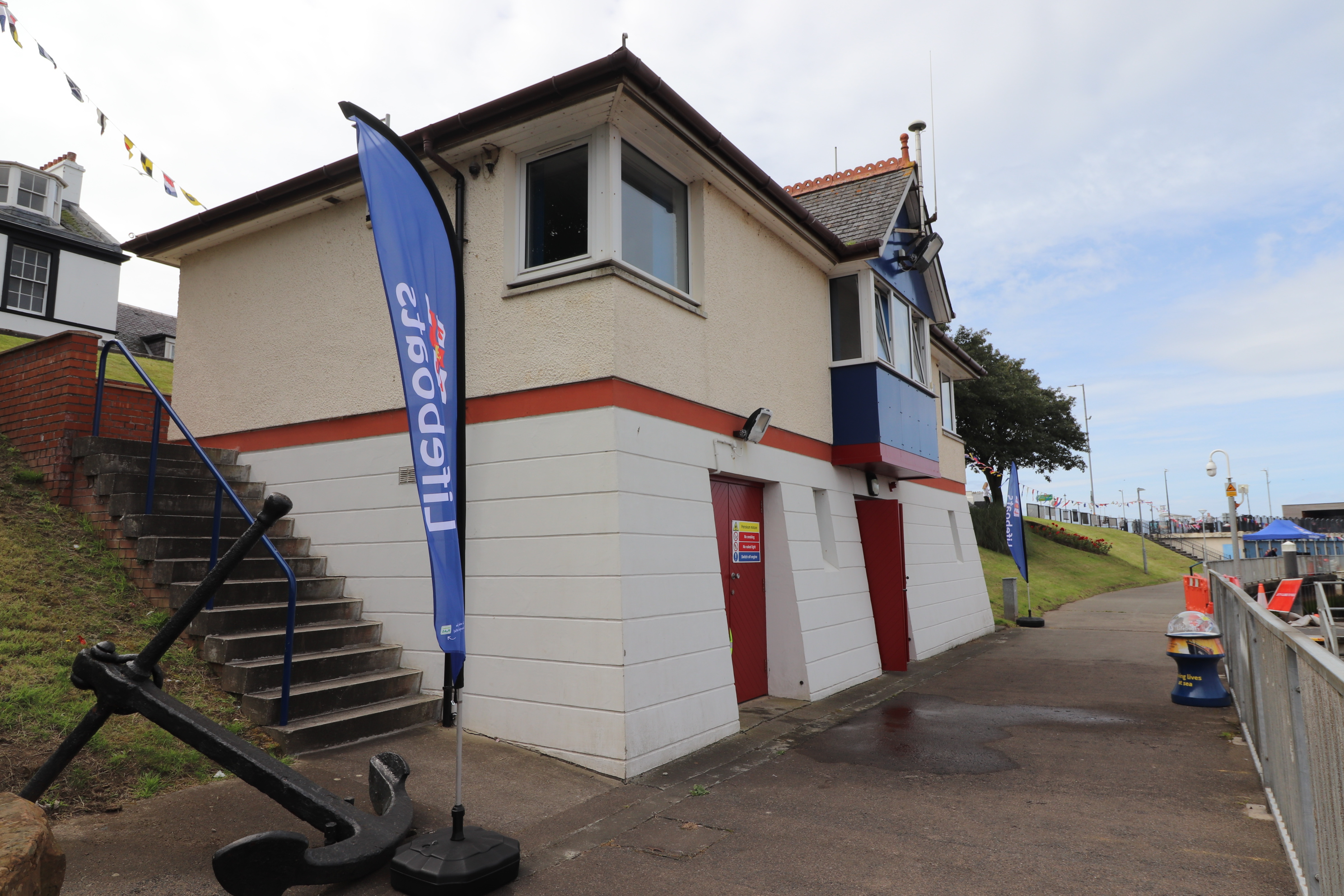
- Girvan Lifeboat Station in 2022

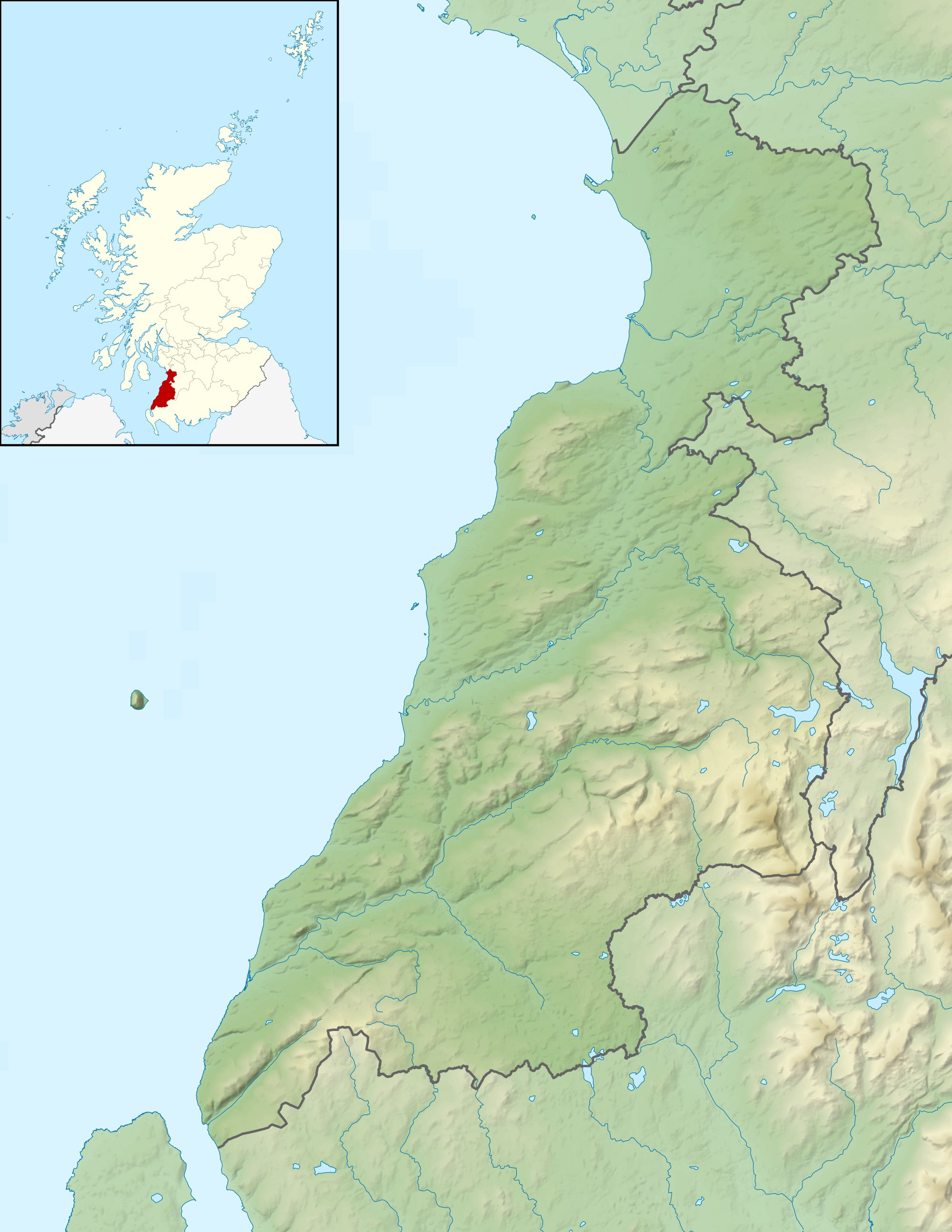
- Location within South Ayrshire

General information
- Type: Lifeboat station
- Location: Knockcushan Street, Girvan, South Ayrshire, KA26 9AG, United Kingdom
- Coordinates: 55.243417°N 4.857583°W
- Opened: First station 1865; Current building 1993; 33 years ago
- Owner: Royal National Lifeboat Institution

Website
- Girvan RNLI Lifeboat Station

Girvan Lifeboat Station can be found on Knockcushan Street in Girvan, a harbour town sitting at the mouth of the Water of Girvan, overlooking the Firth of Clyde, approximately 55 mi (89 km) south-west of Glasgow, in the county of South Ayrshire, in Scotland.

A lifeboat station was established at Girvan by the Royal National Lifeboat Institution (RNLI) in 1865.

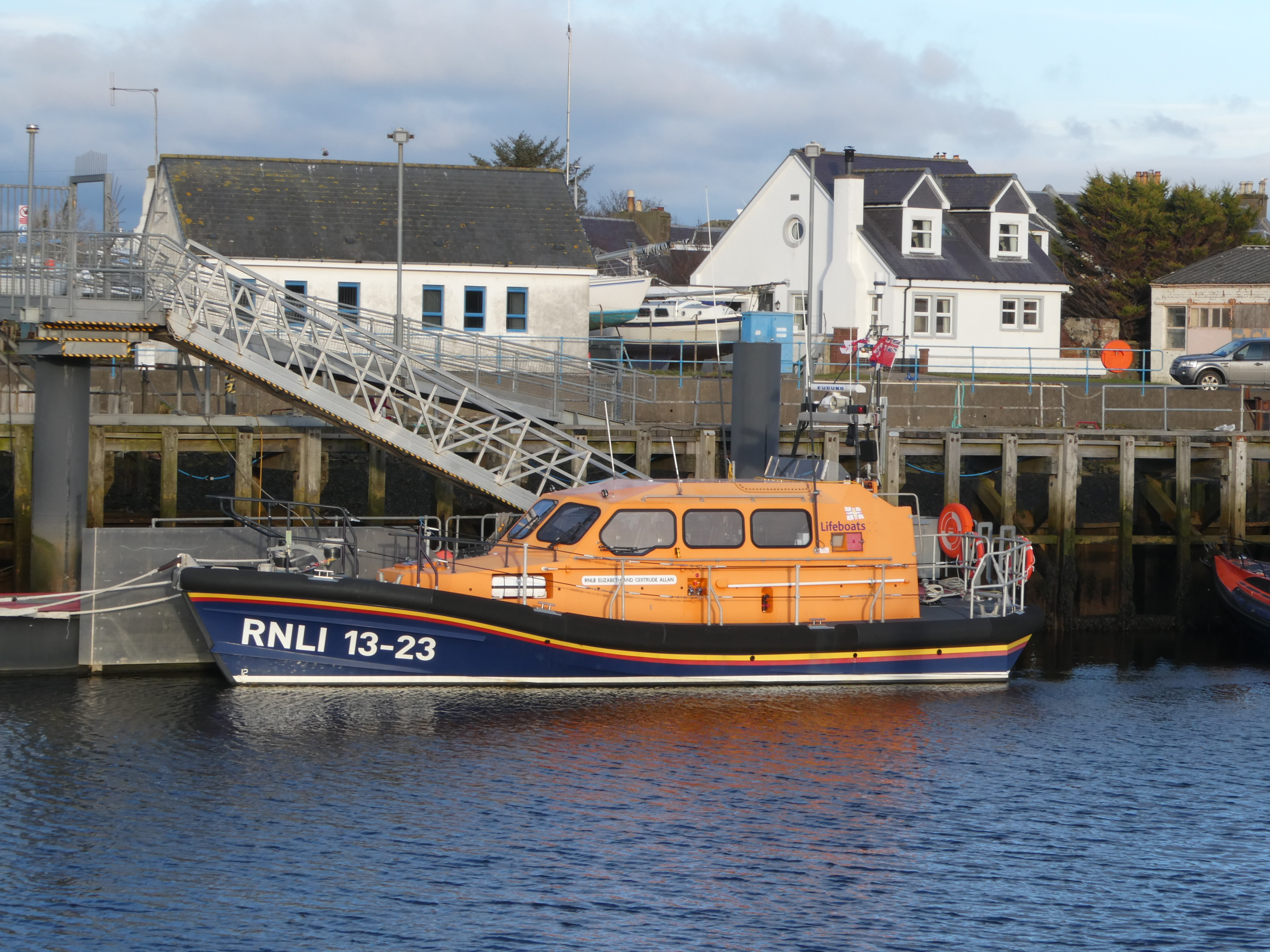
Girvan Shannon-class lifeboat 13-23 Elizabeth and Gertrude Allan (ON 1330)

The station currently operates at Shannon-class All-weather lifeboat, 13-23 Elizabeth and Gertrude Allan (ON 1330), on station since 2018.

== History ==
There were few lifeboats in south west Scotland in the 1860s but they had gradually been established along the Firth of Clyde, the shipping route to the industrial centre of Glasgow. One was placed at Ayr in 1803, Ardrossan in 1807, and Irvine in 1834.

It was decided that Girvan would also be a good place for a lifeboat, as it was a location where there were many fishermen who would be able to form a crew. In 1865, a 32-foot (9.8 m) self-righting 'Pulling and Sailing' (P&S) lifeboat, one with sails and (10) oars, was constructed by Forrestt of Limehouse, and along with its transporting carriage, was conveyed to the town by the London and North Western and Glasgow and South Western railway companies.

This life-boat will be able to command the coast for many miles north and south of Girvan, as there is a good road close to the shore, along which she can be transported on her carriage.

— The Life-boat, Vol.V, issue 56, page 564, 1 April 1865

The gift to the Institution of £400 from Alexander Kay, an insurance broker of Glasgow, was appropriated towards the cost of the boat and carriage. At his request, the boat was named (The) Earl of Carrick. A boathouse was constructed at the seaward end of Knockcushan Street, at a cost of £191-16s, on land donated by Henrietta Dundas Dalrymple-Hamilton, Duchess of Coigny, daughter of Hew Dalrymple-Hamilton.

The Girvan lifeboat Earl of Carrick was launched on 26 October 1868, to the fishing smack Margaret Davis of Girvan, after she ran ashore in a gale, onto a reef of boulders, south of the harbour. The crew had hoped to re-float the vessel, but the gale turned to hurricane. After two hours of exertion, the lifeboat reached the vessel, and saved the crew of three.

In 1882, the gift of £500 from Mrs Popham of Ardchattan, Argyll was appropriated to Girvan lifeboat station. The lifeboat was renamed Sir Home Popham. A replacement 34 ft 0 in (10.36 m) lifeboat arrived on station in 1887, retaining the name Sir Home Popham (ON 167).

When the telegraph failed in 1898, two men, Mr McKenna and Mr Lawson, rode a tandem bicycle in poor conditions 13 miles (21 km) south from Girvan to Ballantrae Lifeboat Station, to alert the crew of a vessel in distress, arriving at 03:00 covered in mud and soaked from the rain. Each man was accorded 'The Thanks of the Institution inscribed on Vellum' for their efforts.

A new boathouse was constructed in 1910, again at the seaward end of Knockcushan Street, just a few yards from the original boathouse, at a cost of £800.

Two of the earliest motor-powered lifeboats were dispatched to stations in Scotland in 1909, being placed at Stronsay and Stromness. However, it would be 1931 before one was assigned to Girvan. In the 66 years that a Pulling and Sailing lifeboat had been stationed at Girvan, the lifeboat had been launched at least 40 times, saving 64 lives.

In the presence of a large crowd, a ceremony was held on the 16 May 1931, with singing led by the Girvan Pipe Band, and a guard of honour provided by the Boy Scouts. A new 35 ft 6 in (10.82 m) self-righting motor lifeboat, with a single 35-hp 'Weyburn AE6' engine, was presented to the Girvan branch by The Duke of Montrose. The lifeboat was the gift to the Institution from Mrs. Lawrence Glen, of Glasgow, wife of the head of the Glen Shipping Line. After a dedication by Rev. R. G. Colquhoun, MA BD, of Chalmers Church, Girvan, Mrs Glen named the lifeboat Lily Glen-Glasgow (ON 739).

With motor-powered lifeboats now at the flanking stations of Troon (1929) and Girvan, able to cover a larger area much faster and efficiently, the remaining P&S lifeboat at Ayr was effectively obsolete. At a meeting of the RNLI committee of management on Thursday 14 January 1932, it was decided to close Ayr Lifeboat Station.

On 12 May 1976, the Girvan lifeboat James and Barbara Aitken (ON 909), which had seen 14 years service at Troon, before being transferred to Girvan in 1968, suffered a fouled propeller, and was subsequently driven ashore. All the crew survived the incident without injury, but the badly damaged boat was withdrawn from service.

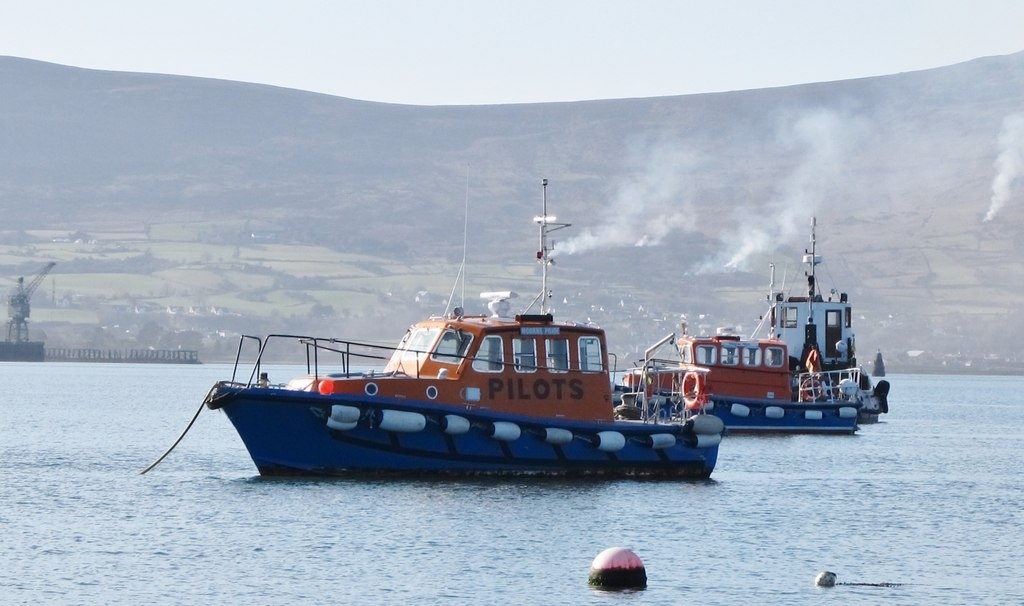
Former lifeboat 33-04 Philip Vaux (ON 1084), now Mourne Mist at Carlingford Lough

The station would receive a new class of lifeboat in 1983. 33-04 Philip Vaux (ON 1084) was a Brede-class 'Intermediate' lifeboat, designed to fill the gap between a full All-weather lifeboat, and the Atlantic 21-class Inshore lifeboat, and operated at Girvan until 1989. A second Brede-class lifeboat, 33-12 Amateur Swimming Associations (ON 1105), was on station until 1993.

After 1983, the lifeboat house was not required to house the lifeboat, with the Brede-class, and successive lifeboats, remaining afloat. A new station building was constructed in 1993, still on Knockcushan Street, but 1/4 mi (0.40 km) closer to the town, on a site overlooking the river. The old lifeboat house was subsequently demolished.

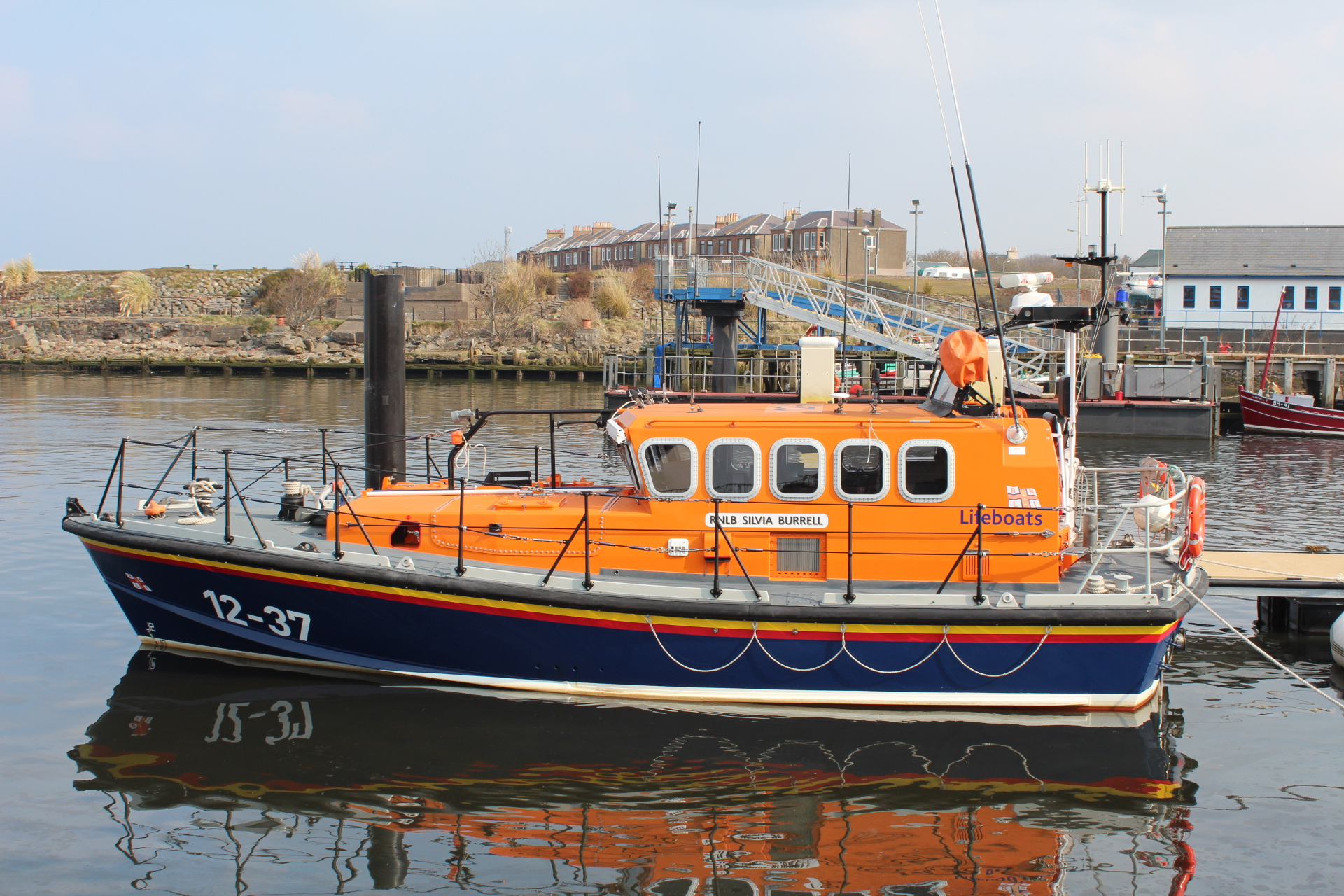
Mersey-class lifeboat 12-37 Silvia Burrell (ON 1196)

In the same year, a new Mersey-class All-weather lifeboat was placed at Girvan. 12-37 was the last of the fleet of 37 Mersey-class lifeboats constructed, costing £680,000. Over 600 invited guests attended a service of dedication and naming ceremony held on Saturday 16 October 1993.

The lifeboat was funded from the bequest of Miss Silvia Burrell, who died in 1992 at the age of 90. Until forced to stop through failing eyesight, she was well known within the RNLI, for having knitted almost 400 pairs of woollen mittens for lifeboat crews. Silvia Burrell, previously Marion Burrell until she changed her name, was also the daughter of Sir William Burrell, who inherited the Burrell & Son shipping line, and became one of the world's great art collectors. He ultimately donated the Burrell Collection to the city of Glasgow. 50 members of the Burrell family attended the ceremony, which was combined with the opening of the new boathouse, where the lifeboat was named 12-37 Silvia Burrell (ON 1196).

A new pontoon berth was constructed at the station, and completed in March 2004, at a cost of £202,390.

After serving Girvan for 25 years, Silvia Burrell was replaced in 2018 by a new Shannon-class All-weather lifeboat. Measuring 13 metres (43 ft) in length and weighing 18 tonnes, the new lifeboat is capable of 25 knots (46 km/h; 29 mph), nearly 50% faster than the previous Mersey-class lifeboat, and has an operation lifespan of 25-years, extending to 50 years with a refit.

The Girvan harbour quayside was lined with a large number of people, families, friends, guests and VIPs on Saturday 5 May 2018, to witness the dedication and naming ceremony of Girvan's new Shannon-class lifeboat. The service of dedication was carried out by the Rev. Richard Moffat, Minister of Girvan North Parish Church. The new £2.1 million lifeboat was funded by The John & Elizabeth Allan Memorial Trust, which was set up in 1998 by Professor James Allan in memory of his parents. Two B-class (Atlantic 85) Inshore lifeboats, and now two Shannon-class All-weather lifeboats have been provided by the trust. With the now traditional Quaich of Whisky, Coxswain Mechanic Callum Govus named the lifeboat 13-23 Elizabeth and Gertrude Allan (ON 1330), after the two late sisters of Professor Allan.

== Station honours ==
The following are awards made at Girvan:

- 'The Thanks of the Institution inscribed on Vellum'
  Mr McKenna – 1898
  Mr C. Lawson – 1898

== Girvan lifeboats ==
=== Pulling and Sailing (P&S) lifeboats ===
On station	ON (Note: ON is the RNLI's Official Number of the boat.)	Name	Built	Class	Comments
1865–1882	Pre-432	Earl of Carrick	1865	32-foot Prowse self-righting (P&S)	(Note: 32 ft 0 in (9.75 m) x 7 ft 5 in (2.26 m) (10-oared) Prowse-class self-righting (P&S) lifeboat, gift of Mr A. Kay of Glasgow, built by Forrestt of Limehouse, London, costing £198.); Renamed Sir Home Popham in 1882.
1882–1887	Pre-432	Sir Home Popham	1865	32-foot Prowse self-righting (P&S)	(Note: Gift of Mrs Popham of Ardchattan, Argyll.); Sold in 1887.
1887–1901	167	Sir Home Popham	1887	34-foot self-righting (P&S)	(Note: 34 ft 0 in (10.36 m) x 7 ft 6 in (2.29 m) (10-oared) self-righting (P&S) lifeboat, gift of Mrs Popham of Ardchattan, Argyll, built by Woolfe of Shadwell, London, costing £336.); Sold after being dismantled in 1902.
1901–1931	452	James Stevens No. 18	1901	35-foot Liverpool (P&S)	(Note: 35 ft 0 in (10.67 m) x 10 ft 0 in (3.05 m) (12-oared) Liverpool-class non-self-righting (P&S) lifeboat, legacy of Mr J. Stevens of Birmingham, Gift of Mrs Popham of Ardchattan, Argyll, built by Thames Ironworks of Blackwall, London, costing £938.); Sold in 1931.

Pre ON numbers are unofficial numbers used by the Lifeboat Enthusiasts' Society to reference early lifeboats not included on the official RNLI list.

=== Motor lifeboats ===
On station	ON	Op.No. (Note: Op.No. is the RNLI's Operational Number of the boat carried on the hull.)	Name	Built	Class	Comments
1931–1952	739	–	Lily Glen-Glasgow	1931	35-foot 6in self-righting (motor)	Last reported derelict at Rye, East Sussex, 2014
1952–1955	795	–	Frank and William Oates	1937	Liverpool	Previously at Eyemouth. Transferred to the Relief fleet, later at Hastings.
1955–1960	874	–	Robert Lindsay	1950	Liverpool	Relief fleet lifeboat. First deployed at Arbroath.
1960–1961	857	–	Glencoe, Glasgow	1949	41-foot Watson	Previously at Buckie. Transferred to the Relief fleet, later at Portavogie.
1961–1968	897	–	St Andrew (Civil Service No. 10)	1951	41-foot Watson	Previously at Whitehills. Transferred to Arklow.
1968–1976	909	–	James and Barbara Aitken	1954	42-foot Watson	Previously stationed at Troon. Withdrawn after being wrecked in service. Sold in 1977, in storage awaiting restoration at Migennes in France, December 2024.
1976–1977	897	–	St Andrew (Civil Service No. 10)	1951	41-foot Watson	Lifeboat from the Relief fleet. Previously at Arklow.
1977–1983	941	–	William and Mary Durham	1957	42-foot Watson	Previously at Berwick-upon-Tweed.
1983–1989	1084	33-04	Philip Vaux	1982	Brede	
1989–1993	1105	33-12	Amateur Swimming Associations	1985	Brede	Previously in the Relief fleet.
1993–2018	1196	12-37	Silvia Burrell	1993	Mersey	
2018–	1330	13-23	Elizabeth and Gertrude Allan	2018	Shannon	

More post-service details can be found on the respective lifeboat class pages.

== See also ==
- List of RNLI stations
- List of former RNLI stations
- Royal National Lifeboat Institution lifeboats
