= Arklow Lifeboat Station =

RNLI lifeboat station in County Wicklow, Ireland

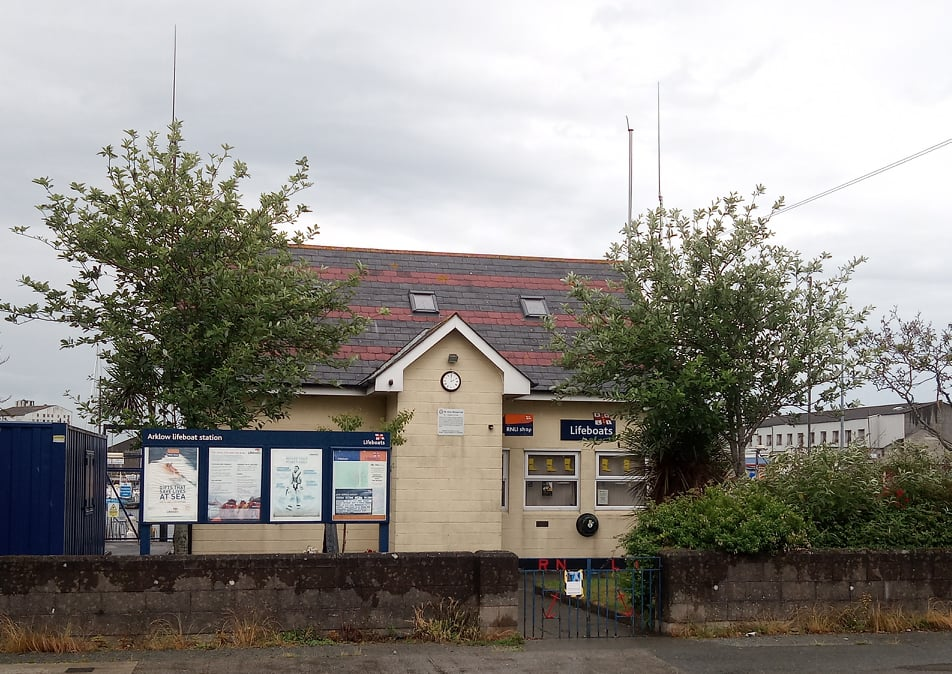
- Arklow Lifeboat Station

- Location within Ireland

General information
- Type: RNLI Lifeboat Station
- Location: South Quay, Arklow, County Wicklow, Y14 HW11, Ireland
- Coordinates: 52°47′31.0″N 6°08′42.5″W
- Opened: RNIPLS 1826–1830; RNLI 1857–present
- Owner: Royal National Lifeboat Institution

Website
- Arklow RNLI Lifeboat Station

Arklow Lifeboat Station is located at South Quay in Arklow, a harbour town at the mouth of the River Avoca, approximately 72 km (45 mi) south of Dublin in County Wicklow, on the east coast of Ireland.

A lifeboat was first placed at Arklow in 1826 by the Royal National Institution for the Preservation of Life from Shipwreck (RNIPLS). It was the first lifeboat station in Ireland, but lasted just 3½ years, and closed in 1830. The station was re-established by the Royal National Lifeboat Institution (RNLI) in 1857.

The station currently operates a Shannon-class lifeboat, 13-53 Roy Holloway (ON 1360), on station since 2025.

== History ==
Following a request from Capt. J. Dombrain, Dublin Inspector of Coastguard, who highlighted a number of shipwrecks in the area, a lifeboat was first placed at Arklow by the RNIPLS. A 24 ft (7.3 m) lifeboat, built by William Plenty of Newbury, Berkshire, and costing £130, arrived on 30 November 1826. She was stored in a boathouse, rented from the coastguard at £7 per annum. It would be the first lifeboat station in Ireland.

Only 3½ years later, having never been launched on service, and at the recommendation of Capt. Samuel Sparshott, Deputy Inspector General of Coastguard, the lifeboat was relocated in April 1930 to Newcastle, County Down, and the station at Arklow was closed.

In 1857, Arklow Lifeboat Station was reopened by the RNLI, after a series of local maritime disasters. An order was placed with Forrestt of Limehouse for a 30 ft (9.1 m) self-righting 'pulling and sailing' (P&S) lifeboat, one with sails and (10) oars, and costing £158. A boathouse costing £120 was constructed with a slipway, for the boat to launch directly into the river. The lifeboat was transported from London free of charge by the British and Irish Steam Packet Company, arriving in Arklow on 7 June 1857.

The 36 ft (11 m) Arundel Venables replaced the 1857 lifeboat in 1863. The boat capsized on service on 19 March 1865, fortunately with no loss of life. On 26 December 1865, she was launched to the aid of the vessel Tenessarian, on passage from Liverpool to Calcutta, ashore on Blackwater Bank. Handled with great skill in dreadful conditions, the lifeboat rescued 34 men. Coxswain Peter Kavanagh was awarded the RNLI Silver Medal.

Just over two years later, a cholera outbreak in Arklow in 1868 claimed 60 lives. One of the victims was the silver medal winner, Coxswain Peter Kavanagh, who had served as coxswain since the station reopened in 1857. He left a widow and eight children.

In 1912, a motor-powered lifeboat was announced for Arklow, and modifications were made to the 1873 boathouse to accommodate the new boat However, it would by 1915 before the boat arrived. The new lifeboat was the John Taylor Cardwell (ON 642), a 40 ft (12 m) self-righting lifeboat, with a single 40-hp engine, delivering a speed of 7.5 knots (13.9 km/h; 8.6 mph).

A case of rum was awarded to the crew of the Arklow lifeboat Inbhear Mor in 1956. The award was made by the Sugar Manufacturers Association (of Jamaica), "for the longest winter lifeboat service". The Arklow lifeboat had been on service to the MV Gansey of Castletown, Isle of Man for over 17 hours.

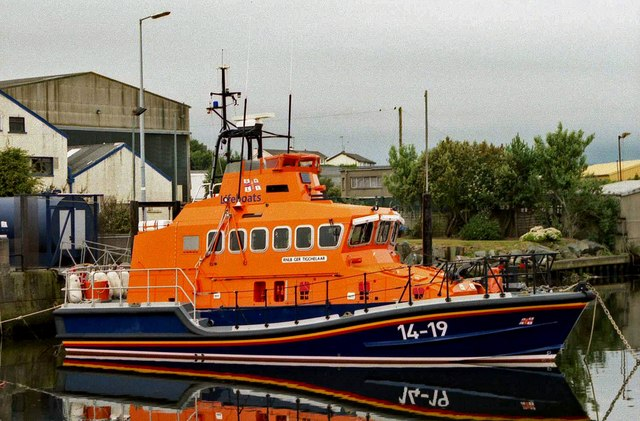
Arklow Trent-class lifeboat 14-19 Ger Tigchelaar (ON 1223)

The 42-foot Watson-class lifeboat William Taylor of Oldham (ON 907) was launched to the aid of the trawler Jadestar Glory on 16 January 1974, ashore on Roney Rock. In extreme gale-force conditions, six men were rescued from two life-rafts. Coxswain Michael O'Brian was accorded 'The Thanks of the Institution inscribed on Vellum'.

In 2023, it was announced that the Trent-class lifeboat 14-19 Ger Tigchelaar (ON 1223), on service at Arklow since 1997, was to be replaced with a new €2.85 million Shannon-class lifeboat. The new All-weather lifeboat 13-53 arrived on station at Arklow, at exactly 13:53, on Sunday 13 October 2024.

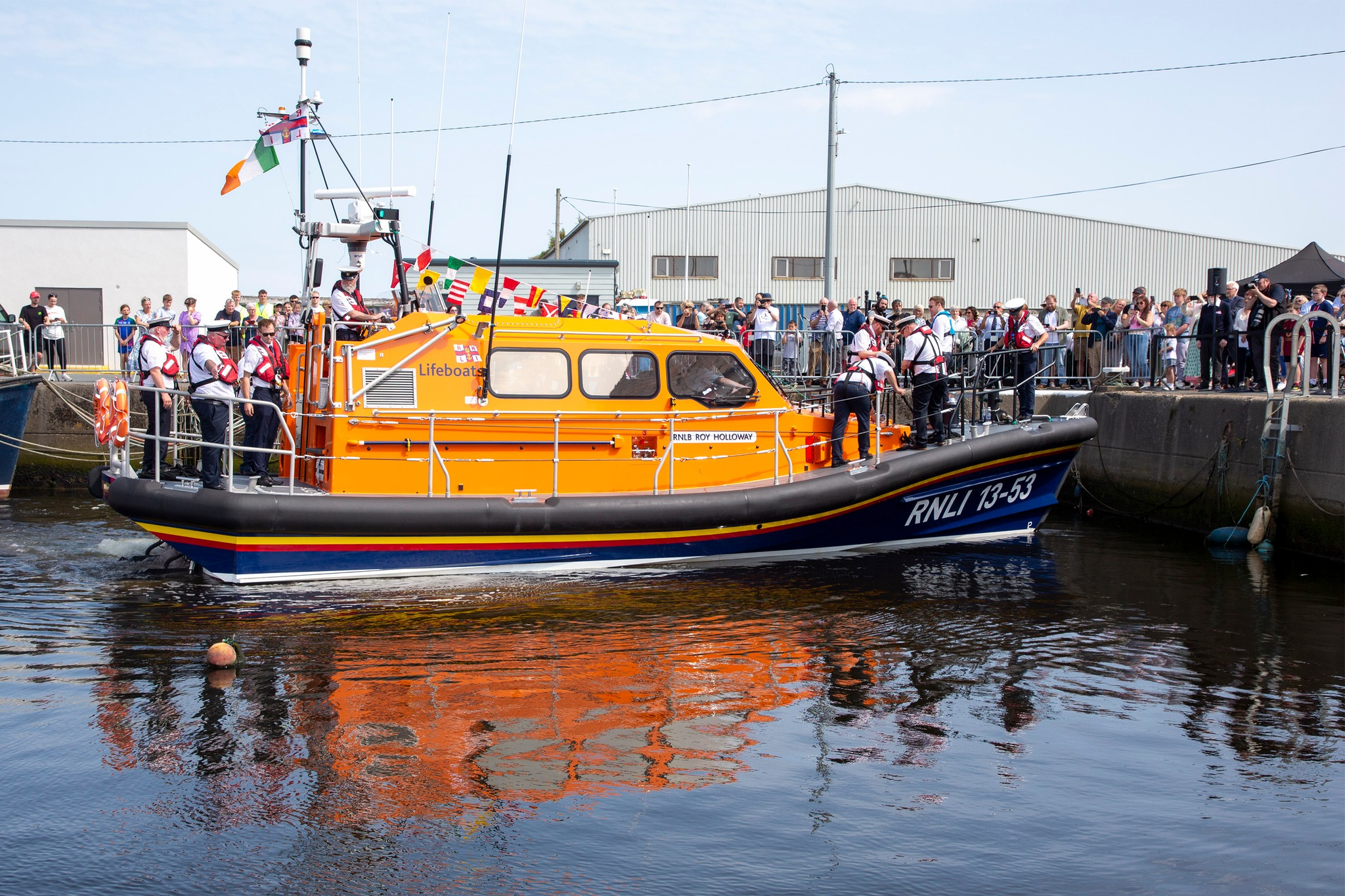
Arklow Shannon-class lifeboat 13-53 Roy Holloway (ON 1360)

At a ceremony on Saturday 21 June 2025, the €3.1million lifeboat was formally accepted by RNLI chief executive Peter Sparkes. A service of dedication was held by Fr. Padraig O'Cochlain, Rev. Michael Anderson, Rev. Jack Kinkead and Pastor Soloman Aroboto. Music for the ceremony was provided by the Arklow Saint Colmcille’s Pipe Band, Arklow Revival Gospel Choir and the Arklow Shipping Silver Band.

John Bermingham, Lifeboat Operations Manager, formally received the lifeboat on behalf of the station, noting that the lifeboat had already been called on 10 occasions since formally entering service in February 2025. The lifeboat was named 13-53 Roy Holloway (ON 1360), in memory of a quietly spoken music teacher from Kingswinford, the primary donor of the vessel, with a £1.4m bequest to the Institution.

== Station honours ==
The following are awards made at Arklow.

- RNIPLS Silver Medal
  James Dillon, Boatman, H.M. Coastguard, Arklow – 1848
- RNLI Silver Medal
  Peter Kavanagh, Coxswain – 1866
  Capt. Edward Kearon – 1867
  John Cummings, Coxswain – 1870
  William Manifold, Second Coxswain – 1877
- 'The Thanks of the Institution inscribed on Vellum'
  Michael O'Brien, Coxswain – 1974
- 'A Framed Letter of Thanks signed by the Chairman of the Institution'
  Edward Dillon, Coxswain – 1997
- A case of Rum from the Sugar Manufacturers Association (of Jamaica)
  for longest winter service 1955-1956, 22/23 December 1955.
  Arklow lifeboat crew – 1956

== Roll of honour ==
In memory of those lost whilst serving Arklow lifeboat.

- Died in the lifeboat on its return from exercise, 30 December 1902
  John Dunne

== Arklow lifeboats ==
=== Pulling and Sailing (P&S) lifeboats ===
ON (Note: ON is the RNLI's Official Number of the boat.)	Name	Built	On station	Class	Comments
Pre-123	Unnamed	1826	1830–1833	24-foot Plenty	(Note: 24 ft 0 in (7.32 m) x 8 ft 0 in (2.44 m) (8-oared) Plenty-class non-self-righting lifeboat, funded by the RNIPLS, built by William Plenty of Newbury, Berkshire, costing £130.); Transferred to Newcastle.
Station Closed 1833–1857
Pre-310	Unnamed	1857	1857–1863	30-foot Peake self-righting (P&S)	(Note: 30 ft 0 in (9.14 m) x 7 ft 6 in (2.29 m) (10-oared) Peake-class self-righting (P&S) lifeboat, funded by the RNLI, built by Forrestt of Limehouse, London, costing £158.); Lengthened in 1864, and transferred to Holyhead.
Pre-294	Arundel Venables	1855	1863–1873	36-foot Peake self-righting (P&S)	(Note: Modified 36 ft 4 in (11.07 m) x 8 ft 0 in (2.44 m) (12-oared) Peake-class self-righting (P&S) lifeboat, legacy of Mr T. A. Venables of Whistones, York, built by Forrestt of Limehouse, London. 30 ft 0 in (9.14 m) x 7 ft 6 in (2.29 m) (10-oared) and costing £156 when new.); Previously Eleanor Cecily at Lytham. Capsized 19 March 1865. Broken up in 1873.
Pre-580	Out Pensioner	1873	1873–1890	37-foot self-righting (P&S)	(Note: 37 ft 0 in (11.28 m) x 9 ft 0 in (2.74 m) (12-oared) self-righting (P&S) lifeboat, gift of Maj. J. A. Brookman of Manchester, built by Woolfe & Son of Shadwell, London, costing £403.); Sold in 1890.
281	Frances and Charlotte	1890	1890–1915	39-foot self-righting (P&S)	(Note: 39 ft 0 in (11.89 m) x 9 ft 0 in (2.74 m) (12-oared) self-righting (P&S) lifeboat, legacy of the Misses English, of Clifton, Bristol, built by Watkins of Blackwall, London, costing £610.); Sold in March 1915.

Pre ON numbers are unofficial numbers used by the Lifeboat Enthusiasts' Society to reference early lifeboats not included on the official RNLI list.

=== Motor lifeboats ===
ON	Op. No. (Note: Op. No. is the RNLI's Operational Number of the boat carried on the hull.)	Name	Built	On station	Class	Comments
642	–	John Taylor Cardwell	1914	1915–1938	40-foot self-righting (motor)	(Note: 40 ft 0 in (12.19 m) x 10 ft 6 in (3.20 m) self-righting (motor) lifeboat, legacy of Mr J. T. Cardwell, with a single 40-hp 'Tylor' petrol engine, built by Thames Ironworks, of Blackwall, London, completed by S. E. Saunders of Cowes, costing £3,599,); Sold in 1938. Renamed Arklow, later Bridget. At Port Dinorwic Marina, May 2025.
807	–	Inbhear Mor	1938	1938–1968	41-foot Watson	
897	–	St Andrew (Civil Service No.10)	1951	1968–1973	41-foot Watson	Previously at Whitehills and Girvan.
907	–	William Taylor of Oldham	1954	1973–1986	42-foot Watson	Previously at Coverack.
1006	44-007	Connel Elizabeth Cargill	1967	1986–1990	Waveney	Previously at Troon. Transferred to the Relief fleet. Later at Portree.
1029	44-011	Augustine Courtauld	1974	1990–1997	Waveney	Initially placed at Poole.
1223	14-19	Ger Tigchelaar	1996	1997–2025	Trent	Transferred to the Relief fleet.
1360	13-53	Roy Holloway	2024	2025–	Shannon	

More post-service details can be found on the respective lifeboat class pages.

== See also ==
- List of RNLI stations
- List of former RNLI stations
- Royal National Lifeboat Institution lifeboats

== Sources ==
- Leonard, Richie; Denton, Tony (2025). Lifeboat Enthusiasts Handbook 2025. Lifeboats Enthusiasts' Society.
- Leonard, Richie; Denton, Tony (2026). Lifeboat Enthusiasts Handbook 2026. Lifeboats Enthusiasts' Society.
