= Coverack Lifeboat Station =

Former RNLI lifeboat station in Cornwall, England

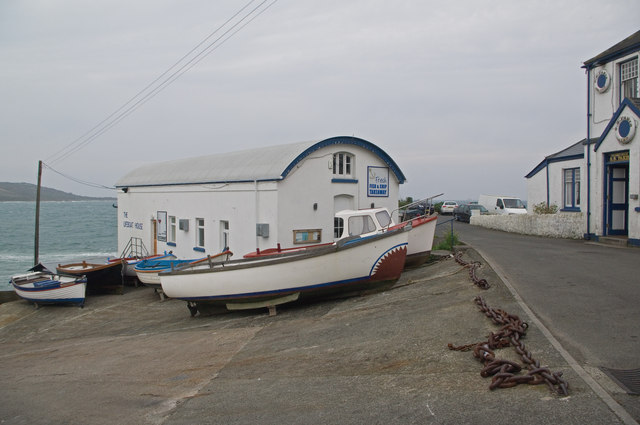
- Coverack Lifeboat Station

- Map of Cornwall showing Coverack

General information
- Status: Closed
- Type: Lifeboat station
- Location: The Cove, Coverack, Helston, Cornwall, TR12 6SX, England
- Coordinates: 50°01′21.3″N 5°05′36.8″W
- Opened: 22 March 1901
- Closed: 27 March 1980

Coverack Lifeboat Station was located on the harbour, in Coverack, a small fishing village about 11 miles (18 km) south east of Helston, on the south-east coast of the county of Cornwall.

A lifeboat station was first established at Coverack in 1901, by the Royal National Lifeboat Institution (RNLI).

After operating for 79 years, Coverack Lifeboat Station closed on 27 March 1980.

== History ==
On 14 October 1898, the steamship Mohegan ran aground on Manacle Rocks. Four lifeboats were called to the wreck, but only 44 people of the 157 passengers and crew aboard survived. Eight months later on 21 May 1899, the passenger liner Paris was wrecked on the Manacles, off Lowland Point. Fortunately in calm conditions, 386 passengers were transferred off the vessel to a tug, by both the Porthoustock and Falmouth lifeboats.

As a result of these two incidents, it was decided to establish a lifeboat station at Coverack, where sufficient number of lifeboat crew could be found from the local fishermen. A corrugated-iron boathouse with slipway was designed by RNLI architect William Tregarthen Douglass, MICE, and constructed at a cost of £1,793-7s-8d. George Cruze and John Corin were appointed Coxswain and Second Coxswain, and visited a number of lifeboat stations to assess different types of lifeboat. Their boat of choice was a non-self-righting type, preferred due to its stability, and on 22 January 1901, a 35-foot Liverpool-class 'Pulling and sailing' (P&S) lifeboat, one with oars and sails, arrived at Coverack. Defrayed from the legacy of £1015 from Mr. F. E. Mills of Penshurst, Kent, the boat was named Constance Melanie (ON 458) in accordance with his wishes.

Her first call on 3 January 1902, would be to the barque Glenbervie, with a cargo of 1000 barrels of spirits, wrecked at Lowland Point. All 16 crew were rescued.

Much has been documented about the wreck of the steamship Suevic, the fifth and last of the Jubilee-class ocean liners, which due to a navigational error in the fog, ran aground at full speed on the Stag Rock, 1 mile (1.6 km) off Lizard Point. In what is regarded as the largest rescue of the RNLI, all 456 lives were saved. 4 lifeboats took part in the rescue, Lizard, Cadgwith, Porthleven and Coverack. Coverack is credited with the rescue of 44 people.

On 10 February 1912, five hours after departing Falmouth, Cornwall, the barque Pindos of Hamburg was driven ashore at The Guthins as the weather deteriorated to a south-east gale. The lifeboat launched at 9:50pm, and on arrival at the vessel, Coxswain John Corin set anchor, and veered down to the vessel, managing to get a line across, and 4 men were pulled aboard. The line then parted, and the decision was made to stand off, until daybreak. A 1000 watt acetylene-lamp had recently been provided to the station, and this was set up at Chynhalls point, illuminating the whole scene. The lifeboat resumed rescue efforts, and the remaining 24 crew were saved. For this service, Coxswain John Corin was awarded the RNLI Silver Medal, with extra monetary awards being given to the crew by both the RNLI and the German government.

Constance Melanie recorded 27 launches and 94 lives saved. On 14 August 1934, a new 35-foot 6in Liverpool-class non-self-righting motor-powered lifeboat, constructed by J. Samuel White, with a single 35-hp engine, capable of 7.45 knots, was placed at Coverack, funded from the legacy of Miss Margaret Quiller-Couch, of Looe. At a ceremony on 26 July 1935, attended by lifeboats from The Lizard and Falmouth, and witnessed by a large crowd, the lifeboat was named The Three Sisters (ON 771) by her cousin Sir Arthur Quiller-Couch, in memory of Margaret, and her two sisters, Maria and Sarah.

On 20 March 1941, the Polish cargo ship Cieszyn was bombed and sunk by German aircraft, 3 nautical miles (5.6 km) south south east of the Manacle Rocks. All 27 crew were rescued by the Coverack lifeboat.

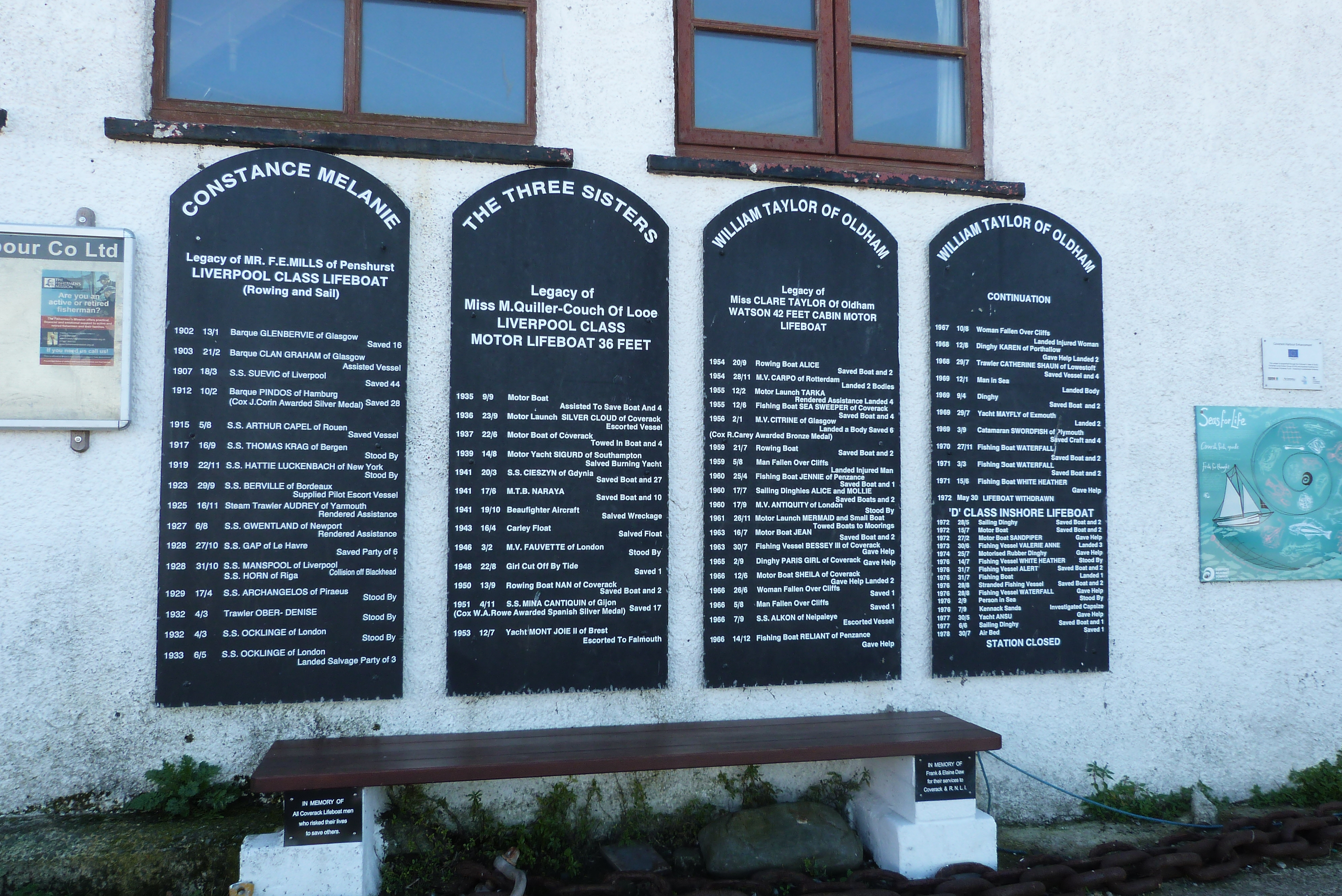
Coverack Lifeboat Service Boards on the old station building

The Coverack lfeboat was launched to the aid of the coaster Mina Cantiquin, which struck a rock at Black Head. 17 crew were rescued in very rough conditions. Unable to recover the boat at Coverack, and so rough in Coverack harbour that the moorings parted, the lifeboat was taken up to Falmouth. It would be two days before it was calm enough to bring the boat back.

The Three Sisters (ON 771) was replaced in 1954. A new 42ft Watson-class lifeboat costing £29,688 had been funded from the legacy of Miss Clara Selina Taylor of Oldham, and was named William Taylor of Oldham (ON 907). It was the first of its type, and to prove her capabilities, the boat was taken on extended sea-trials. Departing William Osborne's boatyard in Littlehampton on 1 May 1954, she was sailed up the east coast to Inverness, cutting through Loch Ness and the Caledonian Canal, and back down the west coast, around Land's End to Littlehampton, arriving back 23 days later, after a journey of 1,500 miles (2,400 km).

William Taylor of Oldham would be launched 49 times over a period of 18 years, saving 32 lives. In a coastal review in February 1972, it was decided to withdraw the All-weather lifeboat, and place an D-class (RFD PB16) Inshore lifeboat at the station. The D-class lifeboat arrived on 1 May 1972, and once fully operational 14 days later, the transfer was completed. The William Taylor of Oldham launched for the last time on 15 May 1972, being reallocated to Arklow until 1986.

The Inshore lifeboat, (D-166), was only operational during the summer months, and was only at Coverack until 1978. A relief boat covered the station in the summer of 1979, being withdrawn as usual in October 1979. The following year, it was announced that an Inshore lifeboat would not be placed at Coverack for the 1980 season; Coverack Lifeboat Station closed on 27 March 1980. The Coverack lifeboats had been launched 104 times, and saved 187 lives, in 79 years on service.

== Station honours ==
The following are awards made at Coverack.

- RNLI Silver Medal

John Corin, Coxswain - 1912

- RNLI Bronze Medal

Reginald Carey, Acting Coxswain - 1956

- The Thanks of the Institution inscribed on Vellum

Archie Rowe, Coxswain - 1951

== Coverack lifeboats ==
=== All-weather lifeboats ===
On Station	ON (Note: ON is the RNLI's Official Number of the boat.)	Name	Class	Comments
1901–1934	458	Constance Melanie	35-foot Liverpool (P&S)	(Note: 35 ft (11 m) (12-oared) non-self-righting (P&S) lifeboat, built by Thames Ironworks, costing £906.); Sold in 1934 but sank in 1966.
1934–1954	771	The Three Sisters	Liverpool	(Note: 35 ft 6 in (10.82 m) non-self-righting motor lifeboat. Built by J. Samuel White of Cowes with a single 35-hp Weyburn AE6 petrol-engine, delivering 7.45 knots, costing £3,248.); Sold in 1954 and survived until 2008.
1954–1972	907	William Taylor of Oldham	42-foot Watson	(Note: 42 ft (13 m) non-self-righting motor lifeboat. Built by William Osborne of Littlehampton with twin Gardner 4LW diesel-engines delivering 8.38 knots, and costing £29,688.); Withdrawn from Arklow in 1988 when it was sold, last reported as a fishing boat in Grenada in 1995.

=== Inshore Lifeboats ===
On Station	Op.No. (Note: Op.No. is the RNLI's Operational Number of the boat carried on the hull.)	Name	Class	Comments
1972–1978	D-166	Unnamed	D-class (RFD PB16)	First stationed at Hartlepool in 1967.

== See also ==
- List of RNLI stations
- List of former RNLI stations
- Royal National Lifeboat Institution lifeboats
