= Ayr Lifeboat Station =

Former lifeboat station in South Ayrshire, Scotland

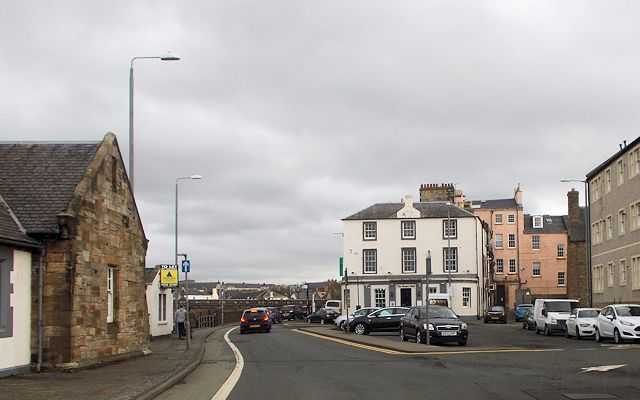
- Former Lifeboat Station, Ayr

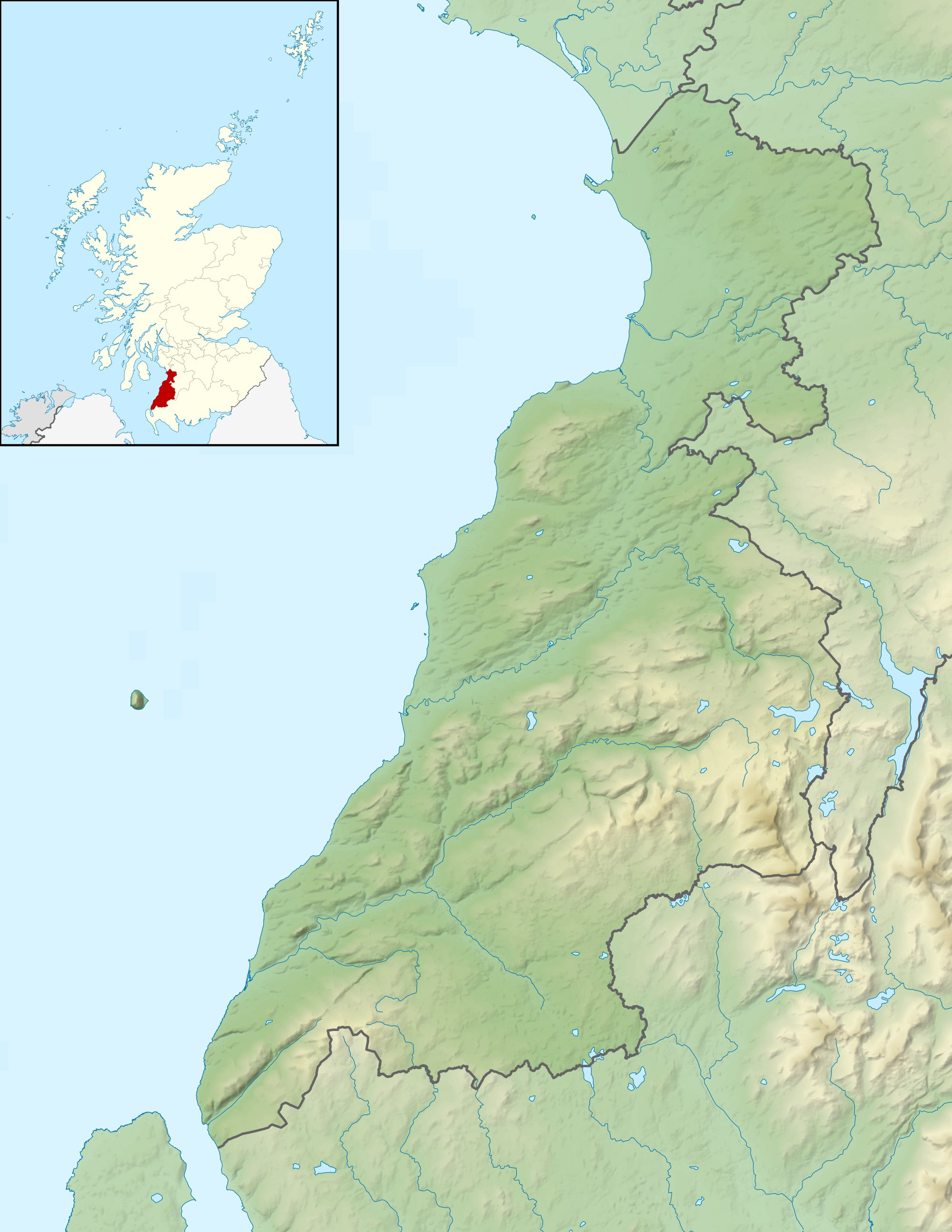
- Location within South Ayrshire

General information
- Status: Closed
- Type: RNLI Lifeboat Station
- Location: Lifeboat Station, South Harbour Street, Ayr, South Ayrshire, KA7 1JD, Scotland
- Coordinates: 55°27′55.0″N 4°38′00.0″W
- Opened: 1859
- Closed: 1932

Ayr Lifeboat Station was latterly located next to the River Ayr near New Bridge, on South Harbour Street in Ayr, a harbour town and former Royal Burgh, overlooking the Firth of Clyde and the Isle of Arran, in the county of South Ayrshire, historically Ayrshire, on the south-west coast of Scotland.

A lifeboat was first stationed at Ayr in 1803. A lifeboat station re-established at Ayr in 1859 was the third station to be opened in Scotland by the Royal National Lifeboat Institution (RNLI), after ones at Fraserburgh and Lossiemouth.

Ayr Lifeboat Station closed in 1932.

== History ==
The first lifeboat at Ayr arrived in 1803, and was in service until c.1819. It had been built by Henry Greathead of South Shields, was funded by Provost Geo. Charles and the Royal Artillery Co. of Ayr, and operated by the Ayr Harbour Commissioners.

In 1819, the Greathead lifeboat was replaced by a similar North country type lifeboat, funded from Harbour Dues, and a donation from Lloyd's of London. No details are available of any dimensions, nor of any service, with the boat believed to be in operation until c.1843.

In the RNLI journal 'The Lifeboat' in October 1859, it was reported that a new unnamed 32-foot self righting 'Pulling and Sailing (P&S) lifeboat, one with 12 oars, double-banked, and sails, costing £179-18s-8d, along with a transporting carriage, had been placed at Ayr at the request of the Port of Ayr Harbour Commissioners. Harbour and port operators were required by the Harbours, Docks and Piers Clauses Act 1847 to provide a lifeboat.

A lifeboat house was later constructed next to the River Ayr, at the north-west end of South Harbour Street, costing £249-18s.

Only a few months after being placed on station, the Ayr lifeboat was launched to the aid of the barque Niagara of Troon, driven ashore at Black Rock 3 miles (4.8 km) north of Ayr harbour, in a strong North-west gale, having only recently embarked on a passage to Syros, Greece. The Master, needing medical attention, was brought ashore first, but wished his crew to remain with the vessel, in the hope of saving her. As conditions and the vessel deteriorated, the lifeboat put out again, and rescued the remaining 11 crew, before the Niagara became a total wreck.

In 1867, the Ayr lifeboat was found to be unfit for service, and was withdrawn. In its place, a new 32-foot self-righting lifeboat was assigned to the station, along with a new launching carriage. The cost of the boat was defrayed by monies from the Glasgow Workmen's Lifeboat Fund, especially through the efforts of Mr G. Norval. Before being sent to Ayr, the lifeboat was first transported to Glasgow by rail, where after being exhibited, it was named Glasgow Workman by Miss Norval, and then launched into the River Clyde for testing, including a capsize exercise. The lifeboat was then transported again by rail to Ayr. The Institution wished to express its thanks to the London and North Western, Caledonian, and Glasgow and South Western Railway Companies for having conveyed both lifeboat and carriage free of charge.

In a strong North-west gale on 29 April 1868, the schooner John C. Wade of Newry was stranded off Troon harbour. The Ayr lifeboat Glasgow Workman was launched, and after great difficulty, managed to rescue the five crewmen aboard.

After 20-years of service, the Glasgow Workman was retired from service, and a new 34-foot lifeboat was placed at the station. The lifeboat arrived at Ayr railway station on 10 March 1887, and then followed a grand procession to the slip dock. Escorted by mounted police, the lifeboat and crew were drawn on its carriage by a team of horses, followed by the lifeboat committee, and groups from the Town Council, Custom House Officers, Volunteers (Artillery), the Rocket Brigade, Volunteers (Rifle), Ancient Order of Shepherds, Ancient Order of Foresters, Free Gardeners, Good Templars, and a very large crowd, accompanied by the Ayr Burgh Band.

After a service of dedication, the lifeboat, the gift of Mr. Thomas Kinkade Hardie of London, was named Janet Hoyle (ON 87), after his wife. In front of a large number of spectators, the boat was then launched into the harbour to be demonstrated. A steam-crane was used to capsize the boat, which self-righted immediately. The Janet Hoyle (ON 87) would be the first of three boats to carry the same name, all funded by the same donor.

At some time around 1906, a new lifeboat house was constructed at the junction of South Harbour Road and Fort Street, costing £634-4s-4d, likely due to the construction of a harbour railway line in 1900, which required the site of the original boathouse.

At a meeting of the RNLI committee of management on Thursday 14 January 1932, it was decided to close Ayr Lifeboat Station. Motor-powered lifeboats had been placed at the flanking stations of Troon (1929) and Girvan (1931), effectively rendering a 'pulling and sailing' lifeboat obsolete.

The lifeboat house at the Fort Street and South Harbour Road junction still stands. The lifeboat on station at the time of closure, Janet Hoyle (ON 604) was sold from service, and used privately for the next 84 years, finally being broken up in 2016.

== Station honours ==
The following are awards made at Ayr.

- RNLI Silver Medal

John Steel, Provost – 1882

Peter Murdoch, fisherman – 1882

== Ayr lifeboats ==
=== Ayr Harbour Commissioners lifeboats ===
Name	Built	On station	Class	Comments
Unnamed	1802	1803−1819	Greathead	(Note: Non-self-righting lifeboat of unknown dimensions, funded by Provost Geo. Charles and Royal Artillery Co. of Ayr, built by Henry Greathead of South Shields.)
Unnamed	1819	1803−c.1843	North Country Non-self-righting	(Note: North Country non-self-righting lifeboat of unknown dimensions, funded by Harbour Dues and Lloyd's of London, manufacturer unknown.)

=== RNLI lifeboats ===
==== Pulling and Sailing (P&S) lifeboats ====
ON (Note: ON is the RNLI's Official Number of the boat.)	Name	Built	On station	Class	Comments
Pre-337	Unnamed	1858	1859−1867	32-foot Peake Self-righting (P&S)	(Note: 32-foot x 7-foot 9in (10-oared) self-righting (P&S) lifeboat, built by Forrest of Limehouse, London, costing £179-18s-8d.)
Pre-498	Glasgow Workman	1867	1867−1887	32-foot Prowse Self-righting (P&S)	(Note: 32-foot x 7-foot 5in (10-oared) Prowse-class self-righting (P&S) lifeboat, funded by the Glasgow Workman's LB fund, built by Forrestt of Limehouse, London, costing £251.)
87	Janet Hoyle	1887	1887−1896	34-foot Self-righting (P&S)	(Note: 34-foot x 7-foot 6in (10-oared) self-righting (P&S) lifeboat, gift of T. K. Hardie of Bayswater, built by Woolfe of Shadwell, London, costing £326.)
386	Janet Hoyle	1896	1896−1910	34-foot Self-righting (P&S)	(Note: 34-foot x 8-foot 3in (10-oared) self-righting (P&S) lifeboat, gift of T. K. Hardie of Bayswater, built by Woolfe of Shadwell, London, costing £334.)
604	Janet Hoyle	1909	1910−1932	35-foot Liverpool (P&S)	(Note: 35-foot x 10-foot (12-oared) Liverpool-class non-self-righting (P&S) lifeboat, gift of T. K. Hardie of Bayswater, built by Thames Ironworks of Blackwall, London, costing £1,007.)

Pre ON numbers are unofficial numbers used by the Lifeboat Enthusiast Society to reference early lifeboats not included on the official RNLI list.

== See also ==
- List of RNLI stations
- List of former RNLI stations
- Royal National Lifeboat Institution lifeboats
