= Arbroath Lifeboat Station =

RNLI lifeboat station in Angus, Scotland

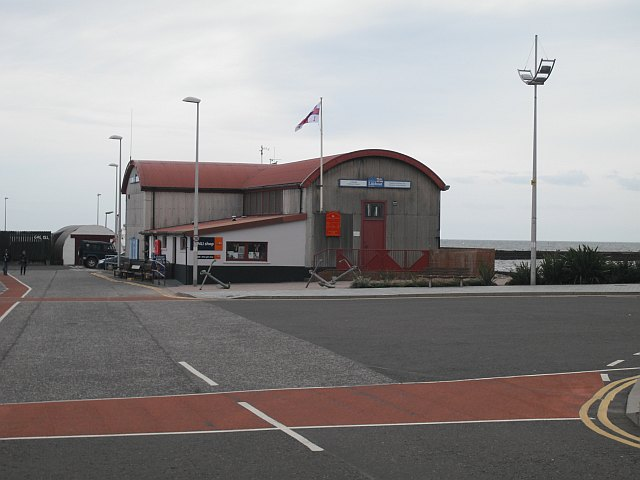
- Arbroath Lifeboat Station

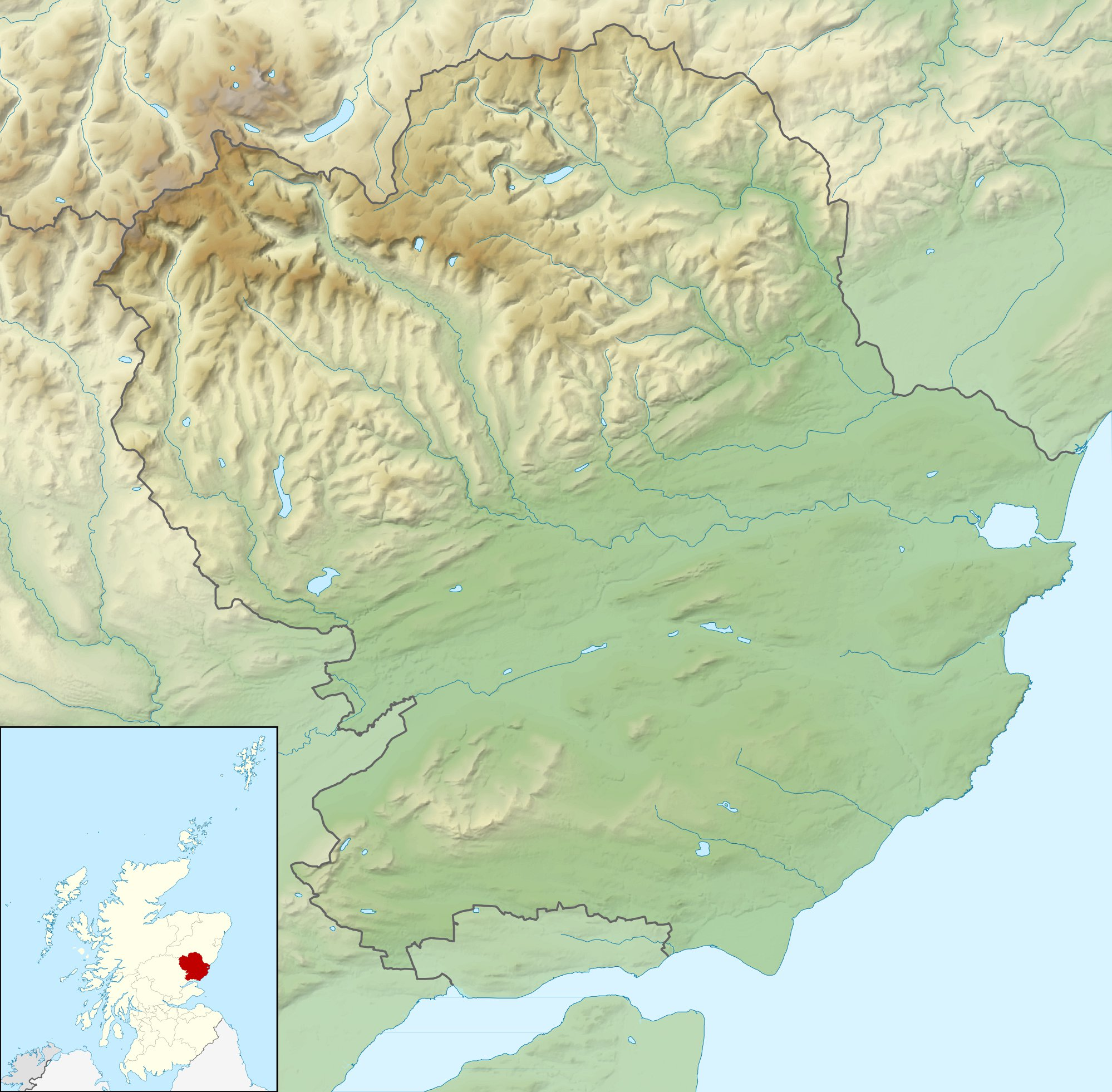
- Location within Angus

General information
- Type: RNLI Lifeboat Station
- Location: Shore, Arbroath, Angus, DD11 1PD, Scotland
- Coordinates: 56°33′19.0″N 2°35′05.3″W
- Opened: 1803 (ALC); 1865 (RNLI)
- Owner: Royal National Lifeboat Institution

Website
- Arbroath RNLI Lifeboat Station

Arbroath Lifeboat Station is located at the harbour town and former Royal Burgh of Arbroath, on the North Sea coast, 16 miles (26 km) northeast of Dundee, in Angus, Scotland.

A lifeboat was first stationed at Arbroath by the Arbroath Lifeboat Committee (ALC) in 1803, with management of the station being transferred to the Royal National Lifeboat Institution (RNLI) in 1865.

The station currently operates the B-class (Atlantic 85) Inshore lifeboat June Marshall (B-954), on station since October 2025, and a smaller D-class (IB1) Inshore lifeboat, Mintybell (D-892), on station since 2024.

== History ==
Arbroath set up a Lifeboat Committee in 1803. With money from Lloyd's of London, and public donations, £120 was raised, and a lifeboat was ordered from Henry Greathead of South Shields, arriving on 10 Aug 1803.

By the early 1850s, the Greathead lifeboat was no longer seaworthy. The RNLI offered to take control of Arbroath Lifeboat Station, but £188-9s-0d had already been raised for a new lifeboat and boathouse, and a new 27-foot 10-oared self-righting lifeboat had been ordered from Thomas Wake of Sunderland. It was to be ready in Sunderland by 1 June 1854, at an agreed price of £115. The new lifeboat arrived in Arbroath in July 1854, towed from Newcastle upon Tyne by Steam Tug. Arbroath Town Council donated £100, and offered the free use of the old boathouse, which was altered to accommodate the new boat.

Things didn't always go well in the following 10 years, with difficulties getting crew, reluctance to practice, and on one occasion, a missing boat-house key-holder delaying the launch. Following a visit and report by Capt. D Robertson, Assistant Inspector of Lifeboats in 1865, the RNLI offered once again to take over the station, which this time was accepted. This brought more formal arrangements, the appointment of Coxswain and Second Coxswain, Honorary Secretary, President and Patron. The Arbroath Town Council funded construction of a new lifeboat house on East Grimsby.

A new 32 ft (9.8 m) self-righting 'Pulling and Sailing' (P&S) lifeboat, one with sails and (10) oars, was constructed by Forrestt of Limehouse, London, and cost £242. This lifeboat, and another one for Peterhead, People's Journal No.1, had been funded by an appeal by the Dundee periodical The People's Journal, with the new lifeboat and carriage first dispatched to Dundee, where it went on public display. The lifeboat was transported free of charge by the Caledonian, Scottish Central, and Scottish North Eastern Railway Companies. After arriving in Arbroath on 2 January 1886, the lifeboat was named People's Journal No.2.

1932 saw the arrival of the first Arbroath motor-powered lifeboat. John and William Mudie (ON 752) was built by Thornycroft, and had a single 35-hp engine, giving a speed of 7 knots (13 km/h; 8.1 mph) and a range of 116 miles (187 km). She could carry seven crew, and 30 survivors. In 1940, the lifeboat was sent to the aid of the vessel Foremost, which was under attack from German aircraft. The lifeboat was brought alongside whilst the vessel was still under machine-gun attack, but seven survivors were taken off. Coxswain William Swankie was awarded the RNLI Bronze Medal, and then later the Medal of the Order of the British Empire.

== Arbroath lifeboat disaster ==
Around 17:00 on 26 October 1953, the cargo ship Islandmagee departed the River Tay, despite warnings of gale-force winds on the BBC Shipping Forecast, due at Leith at 05:00 the following day. The vessel passed North Carr Lightship at 21:15. Some time later, in very poor conditions, both Anstruther and Arbroath lifeboats were launched to reports of distress flares seen from Fife Ness, but nothing was found.

Although bodies of crewmen and a ships lifeboat were recovered from the shore in the following days, the Islandmagee would not be seen again for another 33 years, when the wreck was found by divers in 1986. Calling off the search at 04:30, both lifeboats headed home, but due to the conditions, Arbroath Coxswain David Bruce decided to lie off the harbour, and await daybreak before heading in. Hit by a large cross wave, the lifeboat, a non-self-righting Liverpool-class, was capsized, and six of the crew including the Coxswain, were lost.

The Robert Lindsay (ON 874) was taken away for repairs, but would never return to Arbroath. The boat would later serve at Girvan and Criccieth.

== 1960s onwards ==
An increase in water-based leisure activity in the 1960s would see the widespread introduction of a small inflatable inshore lifeboat at many lifeboat stations, which were quick and easy to launch with just a few crew. Arbroath received a D-class (RFD PB16) (D-16) in 1968.

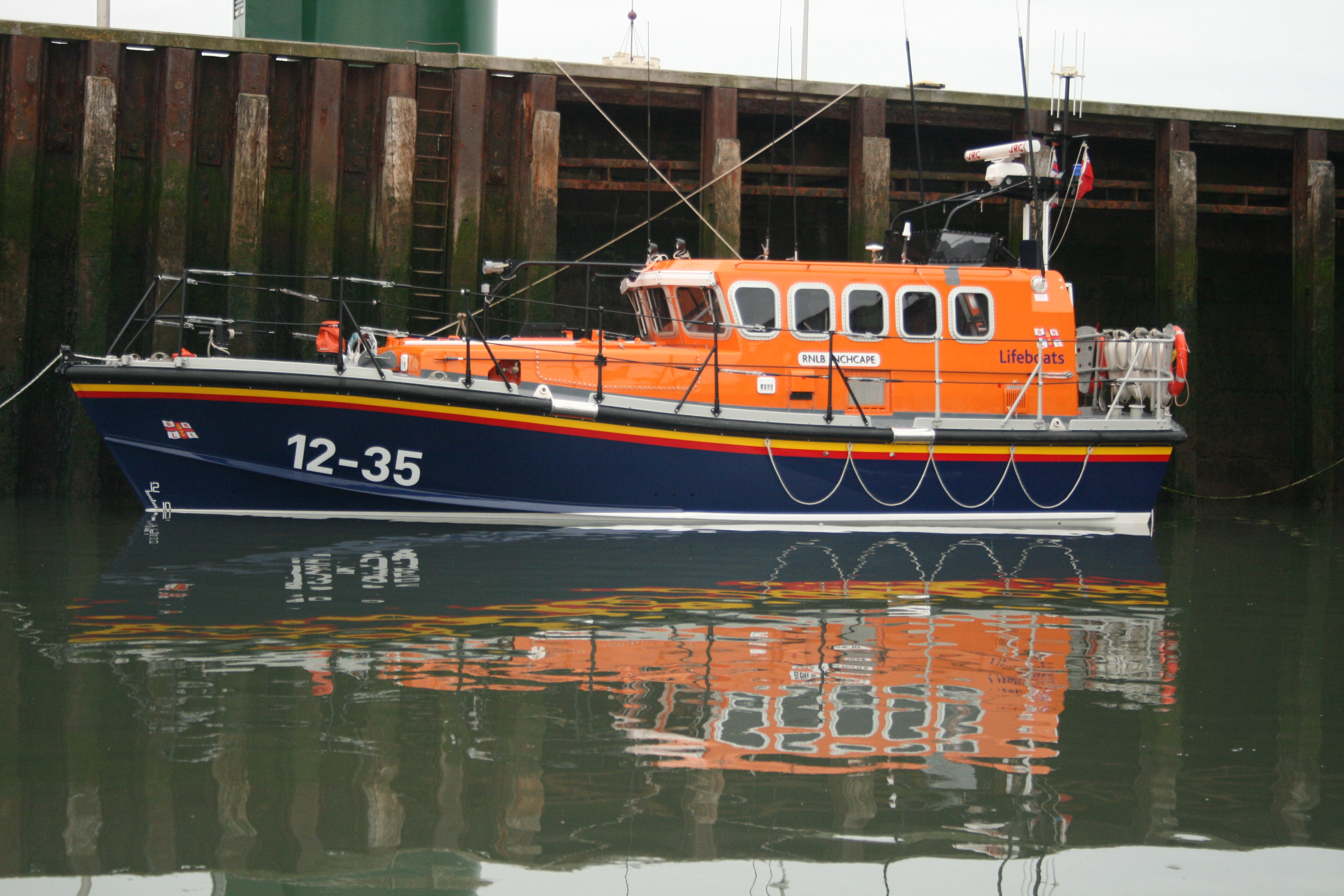
Mersey-class 12-35 Inchcape (ON 1194)

A Mersey-class lifeboat 12-35 Inchcape (ON 1194) was placed at Arbroath in 1993, one of only a handful of slipway-launched Mersey lifeboats. Double the speed of the previous Rother-class lifeboat 37-36 Shoreline (ON 1054), she would serve for 31 years, launch 460 times, and save 12 lives.

On 11 May 2023, it was announced that the All-weather lifeboat would be withdrawn from Arbroath, and replaced with a fast Inshore B-class (Atlantic 85) lifeboat. 12-35 Inchcape departed Arbroath for the last time on 17 March 2024.

Arbroath took delivery of their new D-class (IB1) Inshore lifeboat mintybell (D-892) on 30 July 2024, replacing Robert Fergusson (D-759) which had been on station since 2013.

== Station honours ==
The following are awards made at Arbroath:

- Medal of the Order of the British Empire
  William Swankie, Coxswain – 1942
- RNIPLS Gold Medal
  Lt. Christopher Jobson RN, H.M. Coastguard – 1827
  Lt. Christopher Jobson RN, H.M. Coastguard – 1827 (Second-Service Gold Lifeboat)
- Silver Watch, awarded by the German Emperor
  William. H. Smith, Coxswain – 1905
  David Swankie, Second Coxswain – 1905
  Peter Swankie, Bowman – 1905
- RNLI Bronze Medal
  William Swankie, Coxswain – 1940
- Monetary Award, awarded by the German Emperor
  Arbroath Lifeboat Crew – 1905
- 'A Framed Letter of Thanks signed by the Chairman of the Institution'
  Allan Russell, Mechanic – 2001
  Thomas Yule, Second Coxswain – 2001
  Peter Willis, crew member – 2001
- British Empire Medal
  Maureen Morrison, President, Arbroath Fundraising Guild – 2023KBH

== Roll of honour ==
In memory of those lost whilst serving at Arbroath:

- Fatally injured under the lifeboat carriage during launch, 24 September 1911,
  Peter Swankie, Bowman (64)
- Lost when the lifeboat Robert Lindsay (ON 874) capsized whilst returning across the harbour bar, after launching to reported flares, likely from the vessel Islandmagee, 27 October 1953
  David Bruce, Coxswain, (48)
  Harry Swankie, Mechanic, (63)
  William Swankie (Jnr), Asst. Mechanic, (30)
  Tom Adams, Bowman, (33)
  Charles Cargill, (28)
  David Cargill, (29)

== Arbroath lifeboats ==
=== Arbroath Lifeboat Committee ===
Name	Built	On station	Class	Comments
Unknown	1803	1805−1854	25-foot Greathead	(Note: 25 ft 0 in (7.62 m) x 9 ft 0 in (2.74 m) (10-oared) non-self-righting lifeboat, funded by the Arbroath Lifeboat Committee, built by Henry Greathead of South Shields, costing £120.)
Unknown	1854	1854−1866	27-foot self-righting (P&S)	(Note: 27 ft 0 in (8.23 m) (10-oared) self-righting (P&S) lifeboat, built by Thomas Wake of Sunderland, costing £115.)

=== RNLI ===
==== Pulling and Sailing (P&S) lifeboats ====
ON (Note: ON is the RNLI's Official Number of the boat.)	Name	Built	On station	Class	Comments
Pre-445	People's Journal No.2	1865	1866−1888	32-foot Prowse self-righting (P&S)	(Note: 32 ft 0 in (9.75 m) x 7 ft 6 in (2.29 m) (10-oared) Prowse-class self-righting (P&S) lifeboat, funded by readers of the People's Journal, built by Forrestt of Limehouse, London, costing £242.); Sold in 1890.
176	William Souter	1888	1888−1900	37-foot self-righting (P&S)	(Note: 37 ft 0 in (11.28 m) x 8 ft 0 in (2.44 m) (12-oared) self-righting (P&S) lifeboat, gift of the late Mrs Souter of Dundee, built by D Brown Livie & Co, costing £336.); Sold in 1900.
439	James Stevens No.13	1900	1900−1925	35-foot self-righting (P&S)	(Note: 35 ft 0 in (10.67 m) x 8 ft 3 in (2.51 m) (10-oared) self-righting (P&S) lifeboat, legacy of Mr J. Stevens of Birmingham, built by Thames Ironworks, costing £738.); Damaged in 1925 and sold.
572	James Gowland	1907	1925−1932	35-foot self-righting (P&S)	(Note: 35 ft 0 in (10.67 m) x 8 ft 3 in (2.51 m) (10-oared) self-righting (P&S) lifeboat, legacy of Mr J. Gowland of Harston, Cambridgeshire, built by Thames Ironworks, costing £995.); Previously at Staithes. Sold in 1932.

Pre ON numbers are unofficial numbers used by the Lifeboat Enthusiasts' Society to reference early lifeboats not included on the official RNLI list.

==== Motor lifeboats ====
ON	Op.No. (Note: Op. No. is the RNLI's Operational Number of the boat carried on the hull.)	Name	Built	On station	Class	Comments
752	−	John and William Mudie	1932	1932−1950	35-foot 6in self-righting (motor)	
874	−	Robert Lindsay	1950	1950−1953	Liverpool	Transferred to the Relief fleet, later at Girvan and Criccieth.
797	−	Howard D	1937	1953−1956	Liverpool	Previously at St Helier and Flamborough. Transferred to the Relief fleet, later at Seaham.
934	−	The Duke of Montrose	1956	1956−1982	42-foot Watson	
1054	37-36	Shoreline	1979	1982−1993	Rother	Previously at Blyth
1194	12-35	Inchcape	1993	1993−2024	Mersey	All-weather lifeboat withdrawn in 2024

More post-service details can be found on the respective lifeboat class pages.

==== D class ====
Op.No.	Name	On station	Class	Comments
D-16	Unnamed	1968−1969	D-class (RFD PB16)	
D-170	Unnamed	1969−1972	D-class (RFD PB16)	
D-219	Unnamed	1973−1986	D-class (RFD PB16)	
D-330	Unnamed	1987−1994	D-class (EA16)	
D-471	Coachmakers of London	1994−2004	D-class (EA16)	
D-621	Duncan Ferguson	2004−2013	D-class (IB1)	
D-759	Robert Fergusson	2013−2024	D-class (IB1)	
D-892	mintybell	2024−	D-class (IB1)	

==== B class ====
Op.No.	Name	On station	Class	Comments
B-927	Dylan Rotchell	2024−2025	B-class (Atlantic 85)	Relief fleet
B-954	June Marshall	2025−	B-class (Atlantic 85)	

== See also ==
- List of RNLI stations
- List of former RNLI stations
- Royal National Lifeboat Institution lifeboats
