= 42ft Watson-class lifeboat =

Former RNLI lifeboat class

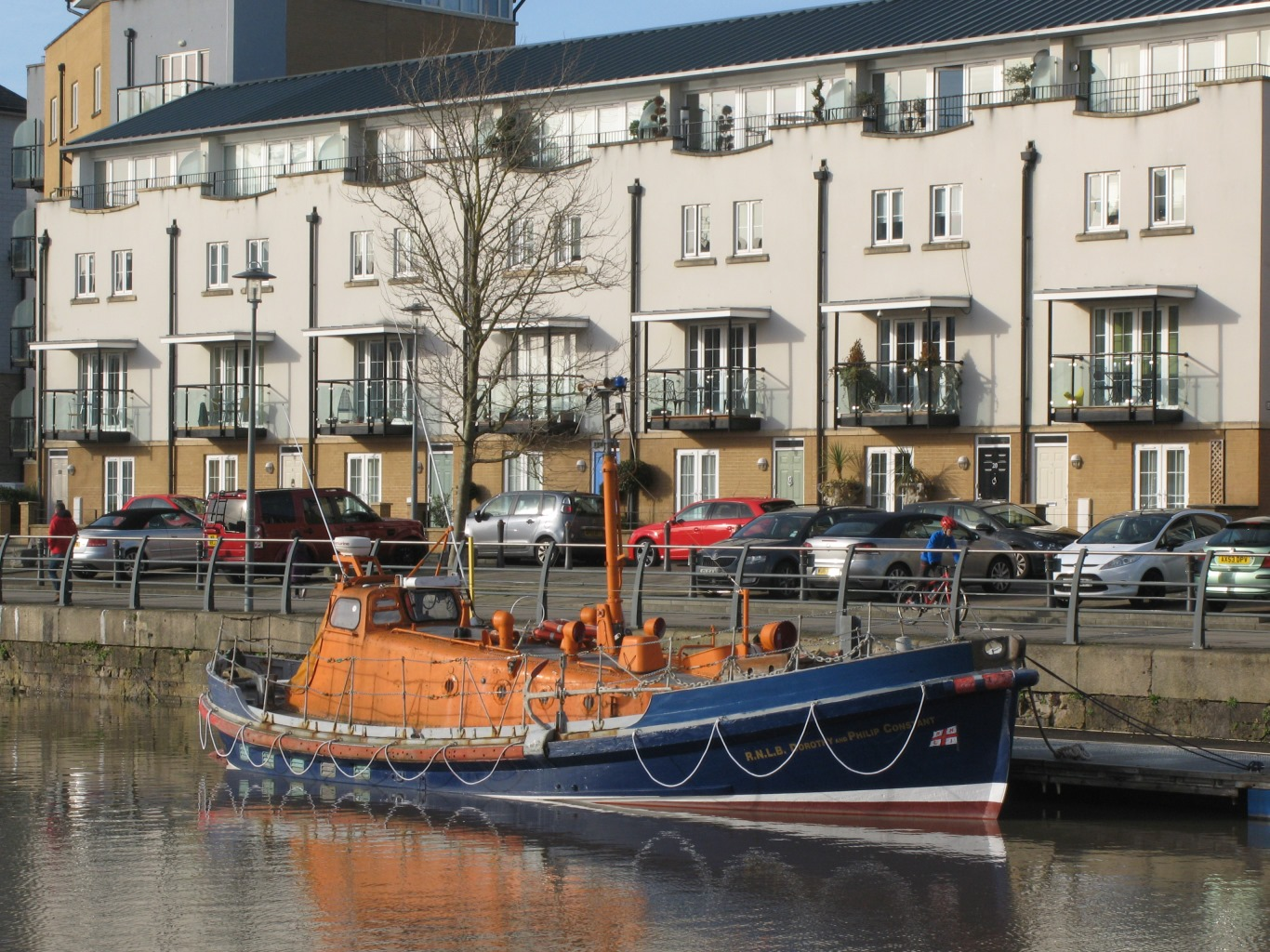
- Dorothy and Phillip Constant

Class overview
- Name: 42ft Watson-class
- Builders: William Osborne, Littlehampton; Groves & Guttridge, Cowes; J. Samuel White, Cowes
- Operators: Royal National Lifeboat Institution
- Preceded by: 41ft Watson
- Succeeded by: various
- Cost: £26,000-£36,000
- Built: 1954-1962
- In service: 1954-1987
- Completed: 10
- Retired: 10

General characteristics
- Class & type: 42ft Watson
- Displacement: 17 tons
- Length: 42 ft (13 m)
- Beam: 12 ft (3.7 m)–12 ft 3 in (3.73 m)
- Draught: 3 ft 7 in (1.09 m)
- Propulsion: 2 × 48-bhp Gardner 4LW 4-cyl. diesel
- Speed: 8 knots
- Range: 235 nmi (435 km; 270 mi)
- Crew: 7

The 42ft Watson-class was a class of non self-righting displacement hull lifeboat, built between 1954 and 1962, and operated by the Royal National Lifeboat Institution (RNLI) around the coasts of the United Kingdom and Ireland between 1954 and 1987.

== History ==
The 42ft Watson was the final example of the medium-sized Watson type lifeboat built primarily for slipway launching at those stations where physical boathouse constraints and/or slipway strength precluded the use of the longer and heavier types.

The prototype, William Taylor of Oldham (ON 907) went on station at Coverack in Cornwall in July 1954 and served there until May 1972, as the final All-weather lifeboat at the station.

In 1957 a version was developed suitable for beach launching. This had a widened (beam 12ft 3in) and strengthened hull to take the rigours of launching over skids.

== Description ==
The wooden hulled 42ft Watson featured a long tapering aluminium superstructure running forward from the aft cockpit. The forward part of this, ahead of the engine room, was a survivor cabin.

A major departure from previous RNLI practice, was the use of commercially available engines, in the form of two Gardner 4LW 4-cylinder marine diesels, each producing 48-bhp. The exhaust from the engines was taken up the forward mast, as with the later 46ft 9in Watson-class boats.

With the exception of the last boat, Dorothy and Philip Constant (ON 967), which came four years after the previous example, all of the boats originally had open cockpits. In 1965, the first boat, William Taylor of Oldham (ON 907), was given an enclosed wheelhouse, followed by Mabel E. Holland (ON 937) in 1967. The others, with the exception of the Aldeburgh boat, had the wheelhouse enclosed in 1971/72.

The Alfred and Patience Gottwald (ON 946) at Aldeburgh, was the only boat fitted with a mizzen mast, at the request of the crew, for a steadying sail in rough weather and was the only boat to retain an open cockpit to the end.

During the course of their service, some boats were fitted with radar, and the original aerial rigging was replaced by a long pole aerial.

== Fleet ==
=== 42ft Watson ===
ON (Note: ON is the RNLI's Official Number of the boat.)	Name	Built	In service	Stations	Shelter	Radar	Comments
907	William Taylor of Oldham	1954	1954–1972	Coverack	1965	No	(Note: Legacy of Miss Taylor, built by William Osborne, of Littlehampton, costing £29,688.); First RNLI lifeboat fitted with commercial diesel engines. Sold August 1986. Renamed Gypsy Moth. Last reported as a fishing boat at Petite Martinique, Grenada, February 1995.
907	William Taylor of Oldham	1954	1972–1973	Relief fleet	1965	No	First RNLI lifeboat fitted with commercial diesel engines. Sold August 1986. Renamed Gypsy Moth. Last reported as a fishing boat at Petite Martinique, Grenada, February 1995.
907	William Taylor of Oldham	1954	1973–1986	Arklow	1965	No	First RNLI lifeboat fitted with commercial diesel engines. Sold August 1986. Renamed Gypsy Moth. Last reported as a fishing boat at Petite Martinique, Grenada, February 1995.
909	James and Barbara Aitken	1955	1955–1968	Troon	1971	No	(Note: Legacies of Miss Aitchison and Mrs Aitken, and a gift from Dr and Mrs Aitken, built by William Osborne, of Littlehampton, costing £25,859.); Withdrawn after it was damaged on service, 15 October 1976. Sold 1977. Renamed Cape Lorna. In storage as James and Barbara Aitken on the Yonne (river), Migennes, France, December 2024.
909	James and Barbara Aitken	1955	1968–1976	Girvan	1971	No	Withdrawn after it was damaged on service, 15 October 1976. Sold 1977. Renamed Cape Lorna. In storage as James and Barbara Aitken on the Yonne (river), Migennes, France, December 2024.
922	Watkin Williams	1956	1956–1977	Moelfre	1972	No	(Note: Legacy of Miss Williams, built by William Osborne, of Littlehampton, costing £27,801.) Sold May 1983. Stored for restoration and possible future display at Museum Wales' National Collections Centre in Nantgarw, December 2025.
922	Watkin Williams	1956	1978–1981	Oban	1972	No	Sold May 1983. Stored for restoration and possible future display at Museum Wales' National Collections Centre in Nantgarw, December 2025.
922	Watkin Williams	1956	1981–1983	Relief fleet	1972	No	Sold May 1983. Stored for restoration and possible future display at Museum Wales' National Collections Centre in Nantgarw, December 2025.
933	J. W. Archer	1956	1956–1987	Wicklow	1972	1976	(Note: Gift of Mr Archer, built by William Osborne, of Littlehampton, costing £27,871.) Sold March 1989. Renamed Irish Rose, later Irma Dewi. Now as J. W. Archer at Porth Penrhyn, Bangor, Wales, September 2025.
934	The Duke of Montrose	1956	1956–1982	Arbroath	1971	1976	(Note: Funded by the RNLI, built by Groves & Guttridge of Cowes, costing £28,500.); Sold 1984 to ADES Uruguay. See below:–
934	The Duke of Montrose	1956	1982–1984	Relief fleet	1971	1976	Sold 1984 to ADES Uruguay. See below:–
941	William and Mary Durham	1957	1957–1976	Berwick-upon-Tweed	1971	No	(Note: Legacies of Mrs Durham and Mrs Davenport, built by William Osborne, of Littlehampton, costing £29,500.) Sold October 1983. Renamed Ron Meadhonach. Last reported as a fishing boat, stored at Portree, Isle of Skye, December 2018.
941	William and Mary Durham	1957	1977–1983	Girvan	1971	No	Sold October 1983. Renamed Ron Meadhonach. Last reported as a fishing boat, stored at Portree, Isle of Skye, December 2018.
967	Dorothy and Philip Constant	1962	1963–1981	Shoreham Harbour	as new	1976	(Note: Gift of Mr and Mrs Constant, built by Groves & Guttridge, of Cowes, costing £36,000.) Sold April 1988. Renamed Constance of Blakeney, Constance, and Pettlandssker. In unaltered condition as Dorothy and Philip Constant at the R.W. Davis boatyard, Saul Junction, on the Gloucester and Sharpness Canal, April 2025.
967	Dorothy and Philip Constant	1962	1981–1982	Oban	as new	1976	Sold April 1988. Renamed Constance of Blakeney, Constance, and Pettlandssker. In unaltered condition as Dorothy and Philip Constant at the R.W. Davis boatyard, Saul Junction, on the Gloucester and Sharpness Canal, April 2025.
967	Dorothy and Philip Constant	1962	1982–1987	Relief fleet	as new	1976	Sold April 1988. Renamed Constance of Blakeney, Constance, and Pettlandssker. In unaltered condition as Dorothy and Philip Constant at the R.W. Davis boatyard, Saul Junction, on the Gloucester and Sharpness Canal, April 2025.

=== 42ft Watson (Beach version) ===
ON	Name	Built	In service	Stations	Shelter	Radar	Comments
937	Mabel E. Holland	1957	1957–1978	Dungeness	1967	No	(Note: Gift of Miss Holland, built by William Osborne, of Littlehampton, costing £30,000.) Sold 1983. Last reported stored on a trailer on a farm near Blaenffos, Pembrokeshire, August 2019.
937	Mabel E. Holland	1957	1979–1983	Relief fleet	1967	No	Sold 1983. Last reported stored on a trailer on a farm near Blaenffos, Pembrokeshire, August 2019.
946	The Alfred and Patience Gottwald	1958	1959–1979	Aldeburgh	No	No	(Note: Legacy of Mrs Gottwald, built by J. Samuel White, of Cowes, costing £30,000.) Sold 1980. Renamed Lord Hurcomb, Patience and Alfie. Converted to be a househoat, engines removed. At South Dock Marina in Rotherhithe, August 2024.
946	The Alfred and Patience Gottwald	1958	1979–1980	Relief fleet	No	No	Sold 1980. Renamed Lord Hurcomb, Patience and Alfie. Converted to be a househoat, engines removed. At South Dock Marina in Rotherhithe, August 2024.
948	Charles Dibdin (Civil Service No.32)	1958	1959–1975	Walmer	1972	1977	(Note: Gift of the Civil Service LB fund, built by William Osborne, of Littlehampton, costing £30,000.) Sold 1988. Renamed Charlie Dee, at Brighton Marina. Reported sold, June 2014.
948	Charles Dibdin (Civil Service No.32)	1958	1975–1977	Relief fleet	1972	1977	Sold 1988. Renamed Charlie Dee, at Brighton Marina. Reported sold, June 2014.
948	Charles Dibdin (Civil Service No.32)	1958	1977–1979	Eastbourne	1972	1977	Sold 1988. Renamed Charlie Dee, at Brighton Marina. Reported sold, June 2014.
948	Charles Dibdin (Civil Service No.32)	1958	1979–1982	Aldeburgh	1972	1977	Sold 1988. Renamed Charlie Dee, at Brighton Marina. Reported sold, June 2014.
948	Charles Dibdin (Civil Service No.32)	1958	1982–1988	Relief fleet	1972	1977	Sold 1988. Renamed Charlie Dee, at Brighton Marina. Reported sold, June 2014.

== Other Fleets ==
=== Uruguay ===
ADES Uruguay is an Honorary Lifesaving Institution founded in 1955. All our volunteers are honorary, people who train weekly to go to sea with the sole purpose of helping whoever requests help. The rescues have no cost to the beneficiaries. At the national level ADES Uruguay is part of the National Emergency Committee and at the international level it is part of the IMRF (International Maritime Rescue Federation)[9]

ON (Note: ON is the RNLI's Official Number of the boat.)	Name	In service	Stations	Comments
934	ADES II Sudelmar	1984–2004	Montevideo	Sold 2004. Renamed Sudelmar. Tourist trip boat, Carmelo, Uruguay, December 2025

== See also ==
- Royal National Lifeboat Institution lifeboats
