= 41ft Watson-class lifeboat =

Former RNLI lifeboat class

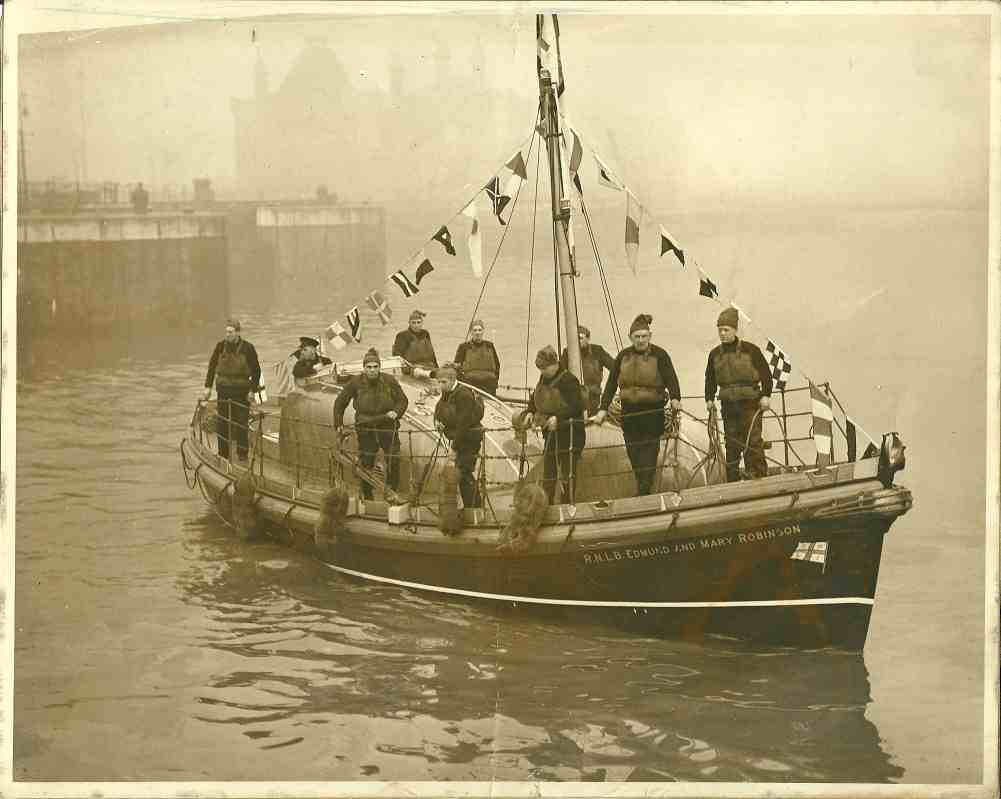
- RNLB Edmund and Mary Robison (ON812), 6th of 13 in the Watson 41 Class. Off Princes Dock, Liverpool, on the occasion of her naming ceremony.

Class overview
- Name: 41ft Watson-class
- Builders: Groves & Guttridge, Cowes; Morgan Giles, Teignmouth; Sussex Yacht Co., Shoreham-by-Sea; William Osborne, Littlehampton
- Operators: Royal National Lifeboat Institution
- Preceded by: Various
- Succeeded by: 42ft Watson
- Cost: £5,636–£20,700
- Built: 1932–1939, 1948–1951
- In service: 1933–1982
- Completed: 13
- Lost: 2
- Retired: 11

General characteristics
- Class & type: 41ft Watson-class motor lifeboat
- Displacement: 14-15 tons
- Length: 41 ft (12 m)
- Beam: 11 ft 8 in (3.56 m) - 12 ft 3 in (3.73 m)
- Draught: 3 ft 8 in (1.12 m)
- Propulsion: 2 x 35-bhp Weyburn AE6 6-cyl. petrol; 2 x 47-bhp Parsons Porbeagle 4-cyl. diesel (8 upgraded, 1963)
- Speed: 7 1/2 knots
- Crew: 8

The 41 ft Watson-class was a non-self-righting displacement hull lifeboat built between 1933 and 1951 and operated by the Royal National Lifeboat Institution between 1933 and 1982.

== History ==
The 41 ft Watson was designed for service at stations which required a larger and more powerful boat than the standard carriage launched types, but which could not accommodate the larger Watson types through boathouse or slipway constraints.

The boat is not to be confused with the earlier 41ft Beach Type Motor lifeboat, which was developed from the Norfolk and Suffolk-class lifeboats. Production ran from 1933 to 1939, with thirteen lifeboats completed.

Between 1948 and 1952 a further four boats were built, before the introduction of the much modified 42ft Watson-class lifeboat, which appeared in 1954.

== Description ==
The 41 ft Watson had an aft cockpit, with a cabin ahead of it containing the engine controls. There was a separate forward shelter and there was room in the two for sixteen people. The boats carried two sails as an auxiliary to the twin Weyburn AE6 6-cylinder petrol engines.

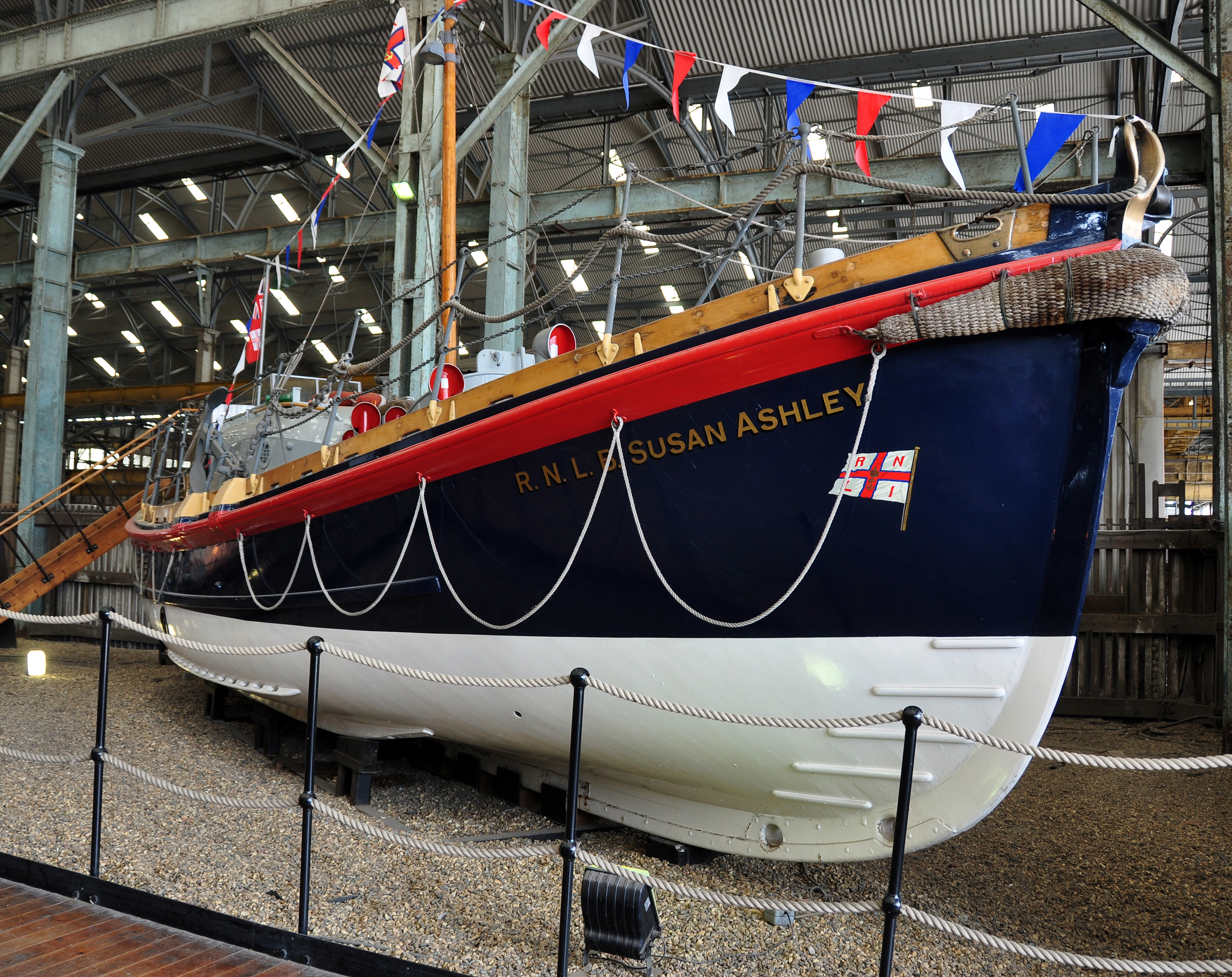
RNLB Susan Ashley (ON 856), built in 1948, on display in the RNLI Heritage Collection at Chatham Historic Dockyard

The type was put back into production in 1948, nine years after the last had been built, in a revised version with an enlarged cabin which replaced the forward shelter.

From 1963, eight of the boats were re-engined with 47 bhp Ford-based Parsons Porbeagle 4-cylinder diesel engines.

== 41 ft Watson-class fleet ==
ON (Note: ON is the RNLI's Official Number of the boat.)	Name	Built	In service	Stations	Re-engined	Comments
758	Rosa Woodd and Phyllis Lunn	1932	1933–1963	Shoreham Harbour	1963	(Note: Legacy of Mrs Lord, plus collections from Mr Lunn and Mrs Perowne, built by Groves and Guttridge of Cowes, with twin 35-hp Weyburn AE6 6-cylinder petrol engines, costing £6,132. Re-engined with twin 47-hp Parsons Porbeagle diesel engines, 1963.) Sold in 1973. Renamed Dowager. At International Boat-building Training College (IBTC) at Lowestoft, until its closure in Nov 2025.
758	Rosa Woodd and Phyllis Lunn	1932	1963–1973	Relief fleet	1963	Sold in 1973. Renamed Dowager. At International Boat-building Training College (IBTC) at Lowestoft, until its closure in Nov 2025.
769	Duke of York	1933	1934–1961	The Lizard	No	(Note: Funded from the King George's Fund For Sailors, built by Groves and Guttridge of Cowes, with twin 35-hp Weyburn AE6 6-cylinder petrol engines, costing £5,636.) Sold in 1961. Broken up at Castlebridge, County Wexford, April 2024.
806	Rachel and Mary Evans	1936	1937–1968	Barry Dock	No	(Note: Legacy of Mr Evans, built by Groves and Guttridge of Cowes, with twin 35-hp Weyburn AE6 6-cylinder petrol engines, costing £6,459.) Wrecked after breaking moorings on relief duty at Weston-Super-Mare 12 April 1969.
806	Rachel and Mary Evans	1936	1969	Weston-super-Mare	No	Wrecked after breaking moorings on relief duty at Weston-Super-Mare 12 April 1969.
807	Inbhear Mor	1938	1938–1968	Arklow	1963	(Note: From RNLI Funds, built by Groves and Guttridge of Cowes, with twin 35-hp Weyburn AE6 6-cylinder petrol engines, costing £6,506. Re-engined with twin 47-hp Parsons Porbeagle diesel engines, 1963.) Sold in 1974. Broken up at Ynyslas Boatyard near Borth, Ceredigion, December 2013.
807	Inbhear Mor	1938	1968–1973	Relief fleet	1963	Sold in 1974. Broken up at Ynyslas Boatyard near Borth, Ceredigion, December 2013.
808	Mary Ann Hepworth	1938	1938–1974	Whitby	1963	(Note: Gift of Mr A. Hepworth, built by Groves and Guttridge of Cowes, with twin 35-hp Weyburn AE6 6-cylinder petrol engines, costing £6,576. Re-engined with twin 47-hp Parsons Porbeagle diesel engines, 1963.) Sold in 1975. 1988, fully restored as a trip boat at Whitby. Sold 2023, at Caernarfon, November 2025.
812	Edmund and Mary Robinson	1938	1938–1950	New Brighton No.2	No	(Note: Gift of Mrs M. Robinson, built by Groves and Guttridge of Cowes, with twin 35-hp Weyburn AE6 6-cylinder petrol engines, costing £6,534.) Sold March 1964. Broken up near Bromsgrove, Worcestershire, February 2016.
812	Edmund and Mary Robinson	1938	1950–1964	Relief fleet	No	Sold March 1964. Broken up near Bromsgrove, Worcestershire, February 2016.
813	Ann Letitia Russell	1938	1939–1976	Fleetwood	1963	(Note: Legacy of Miss A. L. Russell, built by Groves and Guttridge of Cowes, with twin 35-hp Weyburn AE6 6-cylinder petrol engines, costing £6,634. Re-engined with twin 47-hp Parsons Porbeagle diesel engines, 1963.) Sold April 1977. Renamed Angela, then Olive, used as a yacht/ houseboat at Lowestoft (2014). Was stored at ABP Marine, Fleetwood from 2016 awaiting restoration and intended display as Ann Letitia Russell, but the project failed, and she was broken up, April 2025.
823	Matthew Simpson	1939	1939–1972	Port Erin	1963	(Note: Legacy of Miss C. F. Simpson, built by Groves and Guttridge of Cowes, with twin 35-hp Weyburn AE6 6-cylinder petrol engines, costing £7,206. Re-engined with twin 47-hp Parsons Porbeagle diesel engines, 1963.) Sold in 1976. Renamed Penros. May 2022, unaltered pleasure boat with the Hayling Island Yacht Company, August 2025.
823	Matthew Simpson	1939	1972–1976	Relief fleet	1963	Sold in 1976. Renamed Penros. May 2022, unaltered pleasure boat with the Hayling Island Yacht Company, August 2025.
824	John Pyemont	1939	1939–1941	Tynemouth	No	(Note: Legacy of Mr J. Pyemont, built by Groves and Guttridge of Cowes, with twin 35-hp Weyburn AE6 6-cylinder petrol engines, costing £7,358.) Boathouse and lifeboat destroyed in an air raid, 9 April 1941.
856	Susan Ashley	1948	1948–1972	Sennen Cove	1963	(Note: Legacy of Mr C. C. Ashley of Menton, France, built by Groves and Guttridge of Cowes, with twin 35-hp Weyburn AE6 6-cylinder petrol engines, costing £13,357. Re-engined with twin 47-hp Parsons Porbeagle diesel engines, 1963.) Sold 1981. On display at RNLI Heritage Collection at Chatham Historic Dockyard from April 1996.
856	Susan Ashley	1948	1973–1979	Barry Dock No.2	1963	Sold 1981. On display at RNLI Heritage Collection at Chatham Historic Dockyard from April 1996.
856	Susan Ashley	1948	1979–1981	Tynemouth Boarding Boat	1963	Sold 1981. On display at RNLI Heritage Collection at Chatham Historic Dockyard from April 1996.
857	Glencoe, Glasgow	1949	1949–1960	Buckie	1963	(Note: Legacy of Miss Lily Glen, built by Morgan Giles of Teignmouth, with twin 35-hp Weyburn AE6 6-cylinder petrol engines, costing £11,885. Re-engined with twin 47-hp Parsons Porbeagle diesel engines, 1963.) Sold in 1979. Renamed Vagrant. On hard at Burghead Harbour, Moray, February 2026.
857	Glencoe, Glasgow	1949	1960–1961	Girvan	1963	Sold in 1979. Renamed Vagrant. On hard at Burghead Harbour, Moray, February 2026.
857	Glencoe, Glasgow	1949	1961–1965	Relief fleet	1963	Sold in 1979. Renamed Vagrant. On hard at Burghead Harbour, Moray, February 2026.
857	Glencoe, Glasgow	1949	1965–1978	Portavogie	1963	Sold in 1979. Renamed Vagrant. On hard at Burghead Harbour, Moray, February 2026.
858	R. L. P.	1949	1949–1975	Swanage	1963	(Note: Legacy of Mrs A. Pugh, built by Sussex Yacht Co. of Shoreham-by-Sea, with twin 35-hp Weyburn AE6 6-cylinder petrol engines, costing £15,584. Re-engined with twin 47-hp Parsons Porbeagle diesel engines, 1963.) Sold August 1981. Renamed Beya. Was a workboat at Millport, Great Cumbrae, last reported to have been given to a Sea Cadet group, June 1989.
858	R. L. P.	1949	1975–1981	Relief fleet	1963	Sold August 1981. Renamed Beya. Was a workboat at Millport, Great Cumbrae, last reported to have been given to a Sea Cadet group, June 1989.
897	St. Andrew (Civil Service No.10)	1951	1952–1959	Whitehills	1963	(Note: Legacy of Mrs A. Pugh, built by William Osborne of Littlehampton, with twin 35-hp Weyburn AE6 6-cylinder petrol engines, costing £20,700. Re-engined with twin 47-hp Parsons Porbeagle diesel engines, 1963.) Sold in 1982. Restored at New Ross Boatyard, County Wexford. October 2023, on display at West Wales Maritime Heritage Centre, Pembroke Dock, September 2025.
897	St. Andrew (Civil Service No.10)	1951	1959–1961	Relief fleet	1963	Sold in 1982. Restored at New Ross Boatyard, County Wexford. October 2023, on display at West Wales Maritime Heritage Centre, Pembroke Dock, September 2025.
897	St. Andrew (Civil Service No.10)	1951	1961–1968	Girvan	1963	Sold in 1982. Restored at New Ross Boatyard, County Wexford. October 2023, on display at West Wales Maritime Heritage Centre, Pembroke Dock, September 2025.
897	St. Andrew (Civil Service No.10)	1951	1968–1973	Arklow	1963	Sold in 1982. Restored at New Ross Boatyard, County Wexford. October 2023, on display at West Wales Maritime Heritage Centre, Pembroke Dock, September 2025.
897	St. Andrew (Civil Service No.10)	1951	1973–1976	Relief fleet	1963	Sold in 1982. Restored at New Ross Boatyard, County Wexford. October 2023, on display at West Wales Maritime Heritage Centre, Pembroke Dock, September 2025.
897	St. Andrew (Civil Service No.10)	1951	1976–1977	Girvan	1963	Sold in 1982. Restored at New Ross Boatyard, County Wexford. October 2023, on display at West Wales Maritime Heritage Centre, Pembroke Dock, September 2025.
897	St. Andrew (Civil Service No.10)	1951	1977–1982	Relief fleet	1963	Sold in 1982. Restored at New Ross Boatyard, County Wexford. October 2023, on display at West Wales Maritime Heritage Centre, Pembroke Dock, September 2025.

== See also ==
- Watson-class lifeboat
- Royal National Lifeboat Institution lifeboats
