= Ballantrae Lifeboat Station =

Former RNLI lifeboat station in South Ayrshire, Scotland

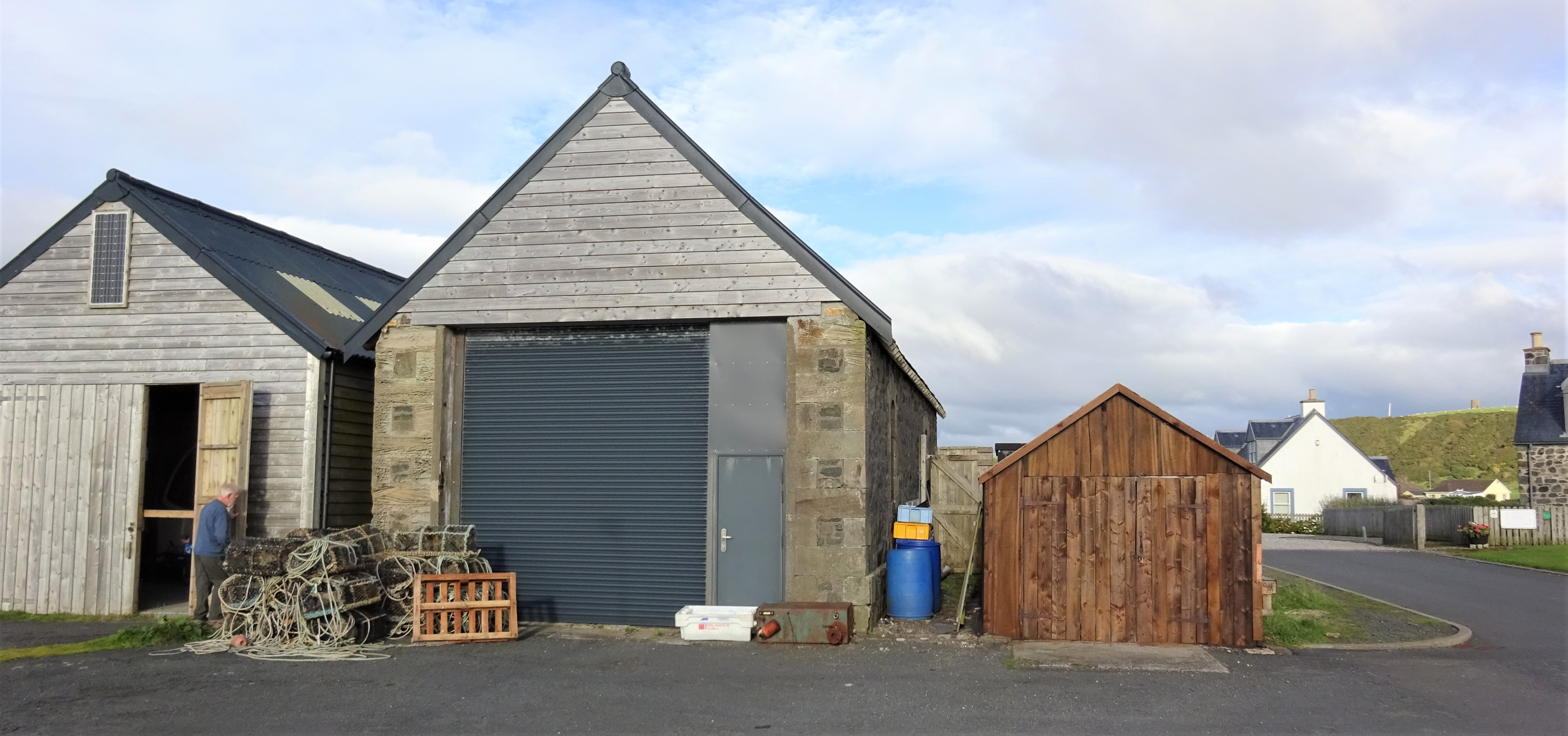
- Former Lifeboat Station, Ballantrae

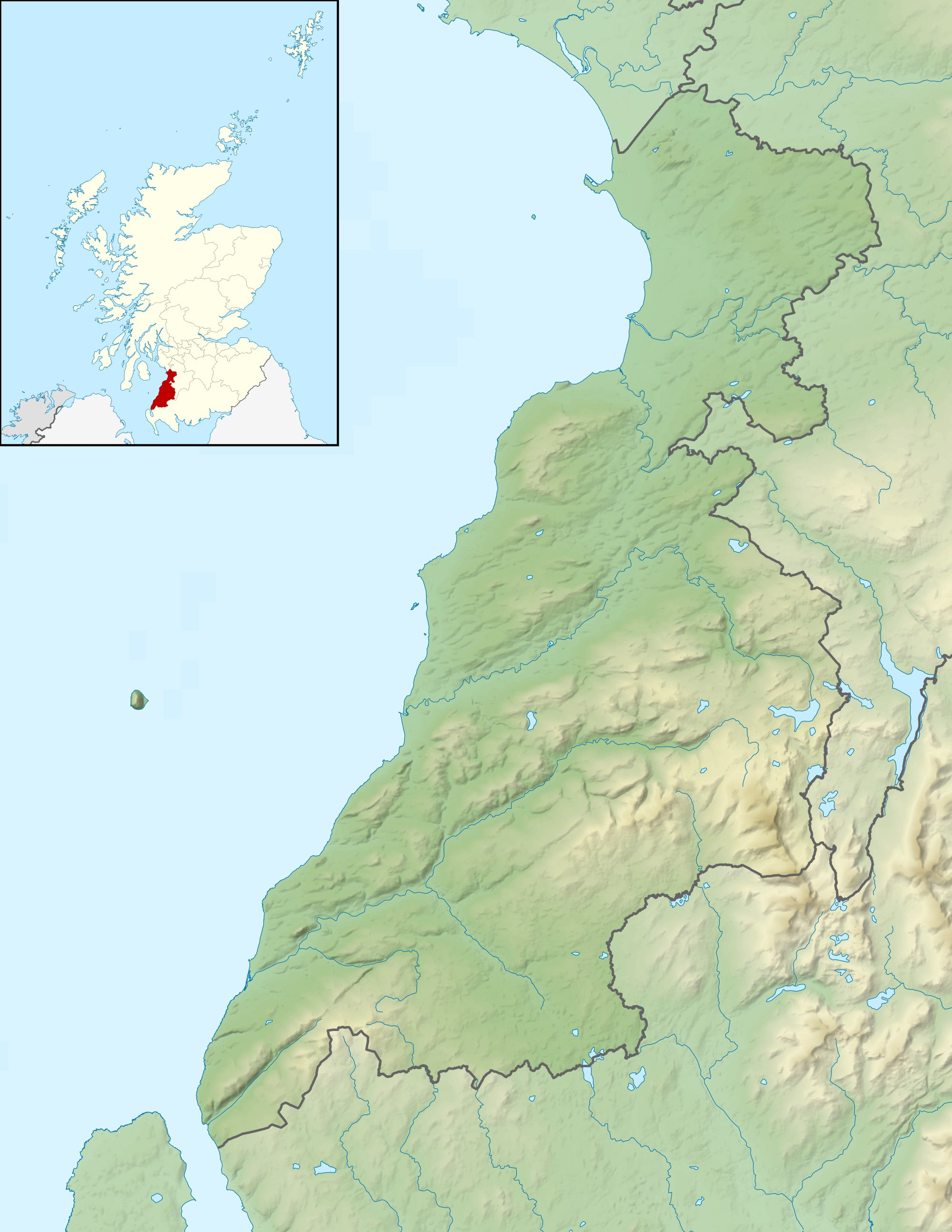
- Ballantrae, South Ayrshire

General information
- Status: Closed
- Type: RNLI Lifeboat Station
- Location: Lifeboat Station, Foreland, Ballantrae, South Ayrshire, KA26 0NP, Scotland
- Coordinates: 55°06′14.7″N 5°00′30.3″W
- Opened: 1871
- Closed: 1919

Ballantrae Lifeboat Station was located on the south-west coast of Scotland at Ballantrae, a village approximately 17 miles (27 km) north of Stranraer, in the county of South Ayrshire, historically Ayrshire.

A lifeboat was first stationed at Ballantrae by the Royal National Lifeboat Institution (RNLI) in 1871.

After operating for 48 years, Ballantrae Lifeboat Station closed in 1919.

== History ==
At the meeting of the RNLI Committee of Management on Thursday 2 December 1869, with reference to the application of local residents, and the subsequent visit and report of the RNLI Inspector of Lifeboats, it was decided to establish a lifeboat station at Ballantrae. It was also decided to appropriate the legacy of the late Mrs Harriot Richardson of Greenwich to the station, and that the lifeboat placed on station was to be named William and Harriot, in accordance with her wishes.

The RNLI journal 'The Lifeboat' of 1 August 1872 reported a 33-foot self-righting 'Pulling and Sailing' (P&S) lifeboat, one with sails and 10 oars, arriving on station in January 1871. It had been deemed that there were sufficient fishermen resident locally, to be able to crew the lifeboat, which had been transported along with its carriage to Girvan by the London and North-Western and Glasgow and South Western railway companies, the latter being free of charge. The lifeboat, which cost £284-15s, was met by her crew, who then sailed her down to Ballantrae, with the carriage being taken by road.

At a ceremony on 1 February 1871, the lifeboat was paraded through the village to the newly built boathouse, which cost £194-16s, and was duly named William and Harriot (ON 268), before being demonstrated to the assembled crowd.

At 20:00 on the 23 January 1877, the Ballantrae lifeboat was launched to the aid of the brig Aurora, of Ardrossan, on passage from Belfast. The lifeboat arrived with the vessel at 21:00, which had now struck a reef, and the crew of seven were rescued.

A larger lifeboat was sent to Ballantrae in 1906. The 35-foot self-righting Dungeness-class lifeboat, designed by Rubie, was also named William and Harriot (ON 548).

During the salvage operation of the S.S. Deloraine on 29 January 1909, which had run aground at Ballantrae in a blizzard in December, a storm blew up. The salvage boat was unable to get in close in the conditions, so the Ballantrae lifeboat was called. With skilful navigation by the lifeboat coxswain in dangerous rock strewn shores, eight men were rescued from the vessel.

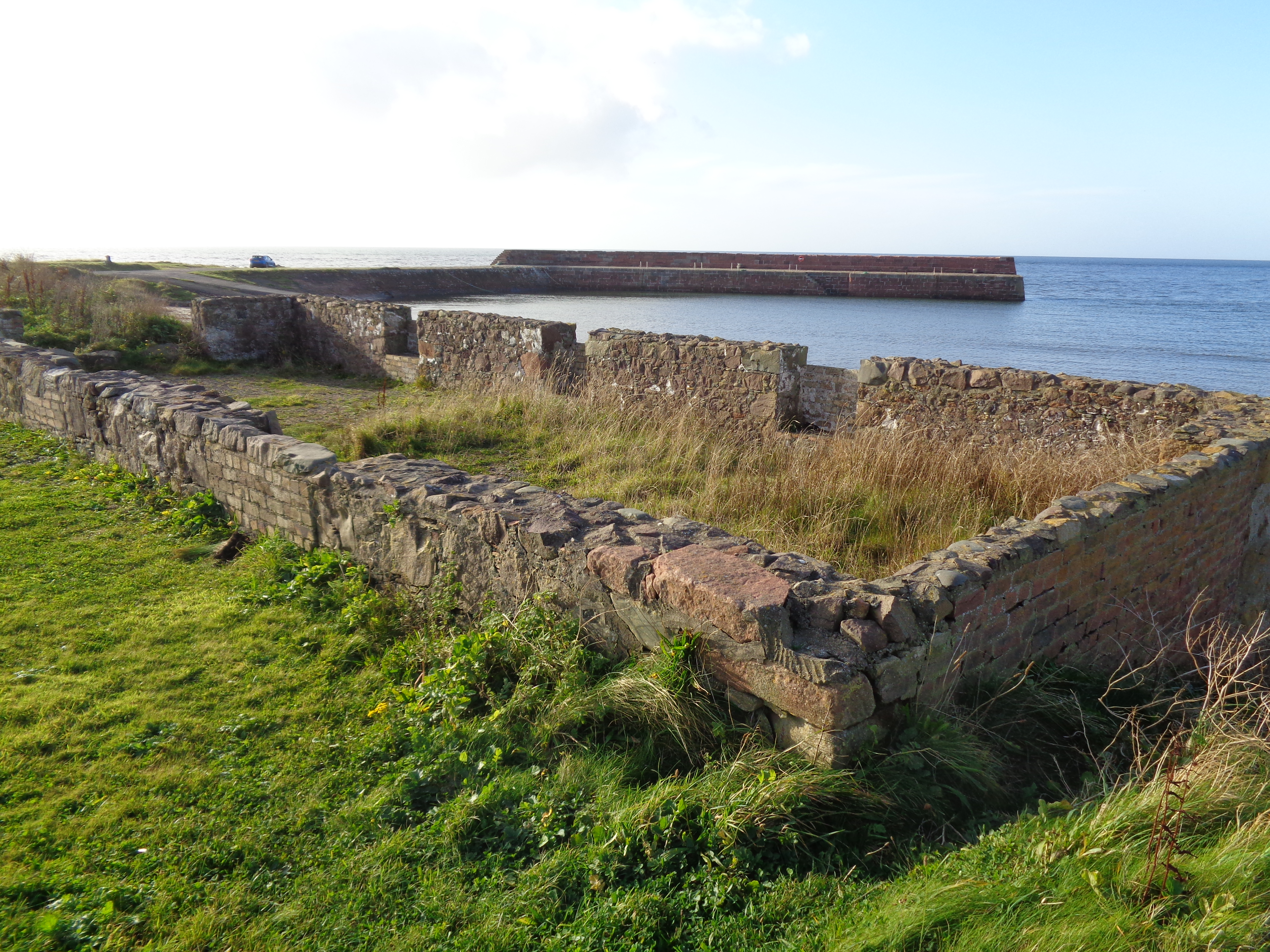
Old Boat House ruins, Ballantrae Harbour

Ballantrae Lifeboat Station was closed in 1919. At the ninety-sixth annual general meeting of the RNLI, held at Caxton Hall, Westminster on Thursday, 22nd April 1920, Gen. Sir Coleridge Grove wished the meeting to approve and ratify the sale of the Life-Boat Houses at Prior's Haven, Tynemouth, and at Ballantrae, which were no longer required for the purposes of the Institution.

A lifeboat house still stands, used as a store. The last lifeboat on station, William and Harriot (ON 548) was transferred to the relief fleet, before being sold from service in 1930. She was last reported as a yacht at Greenock in the 1960s.

Besides the complete boathouse pictured at the top of the page, there are also the remains of a derelict boathouse at Ballantrae. It is unclear from available maps, and no records have been found, as to exactly which one was the RNLI boathouse, or if they were both RNLI boathouses. It is possible that a second one was constructed for the arrival of the larger boat in 1906.

== Station honours ==
The following are awards made at Ballantrae.

- The Thanks of the Institution inscribed on Vellum

H. A. Inglis, Honorary Secretary – 1892

H. A. Inglis, Honorary Secretary, upon his resignation after 28 years – 1920

== Ballantrae lifeboats ==
=== Pulling and Sailing (P&S) lifeboats ===
ON (Note: ON is the RNLI's Official Number of the boat.)	Name	Built	On station	Class	Comments
268	William and Harriot	1870	1871−1906	33-foot Peake Self-righting (P&S)	(Note: 33-foot x 8-foot (10-oared) Peake-class self-righting (P&S) lifeboat, legacy of Mrs H. Richardson of Greenwich, built by Woolfe of Shadwell, London, costing £286.)
548	William and Harriot	1906	1906−1919	35-foot Rubie Self-righting (P&S)	(Note: 35-foot x 8-foot 10in (10-oared) Rubie self-righting (P&S) lifeboat, legacy of Mrs H. Richardson of Greenwich, built by Thames Ironworks of Blackwall, London, costing £1,120.)

Station closed, 1919

== See also ==
- List of RNLI stations
- List of former RNLI stations
- Royal National Lifeboat Institution lifeboats
