= Civil Service lifeboats =

Group of RNLI lifeboats

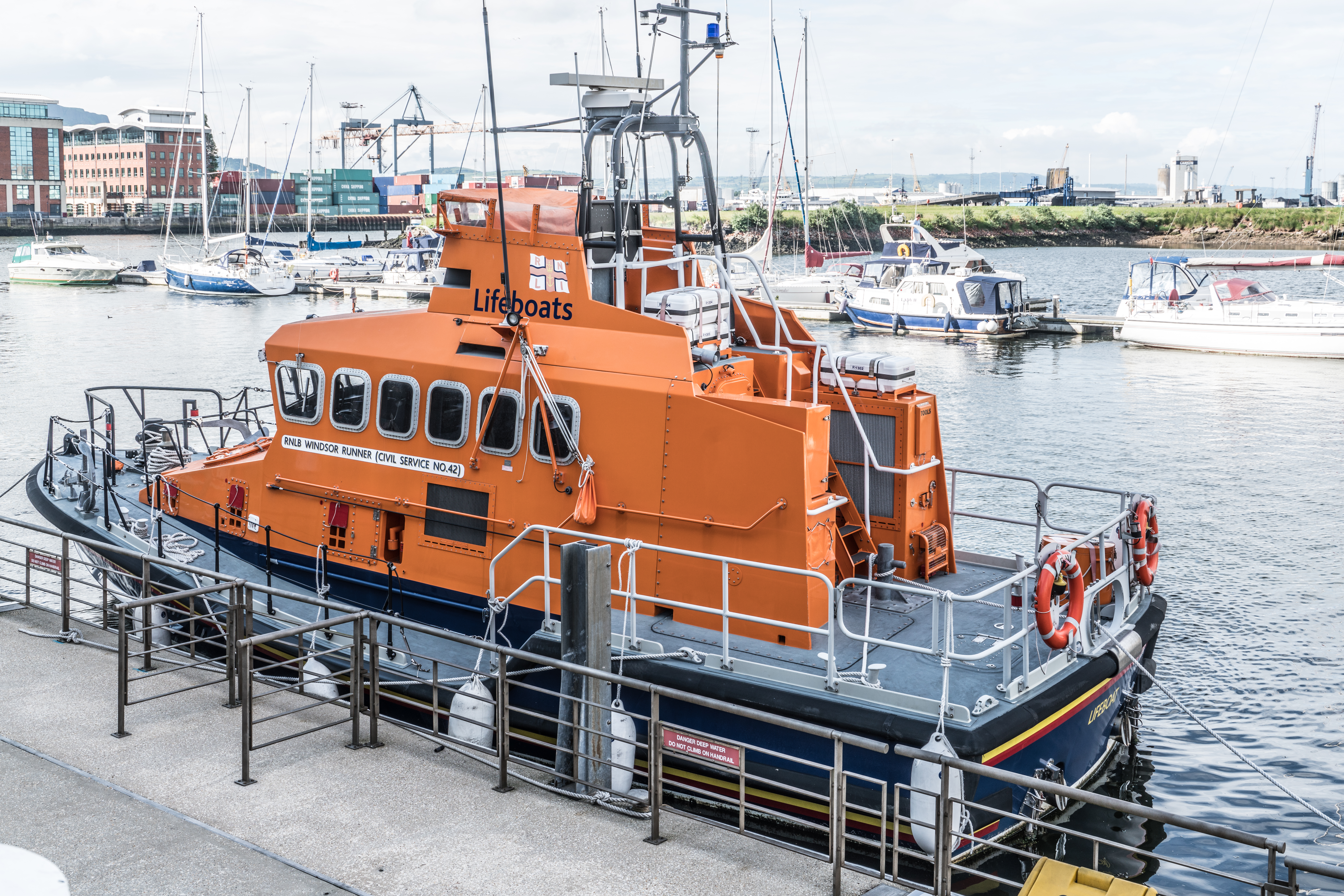
RNLB 14-06 Windsor Runner (Civil Service No. 42)

Civil Service lifeboats are a group of lifeboats belonging to the Royal National Lifeboat Institution which have been funded by The Lifeboat Fund. They usually have the Civil Service designation and number included in the name, such as RNLB E-001 Public Servant (Civil Service No. 44), which was on service at Tower lifeboat station on the Thames between 2002 and 2012.

The Lifeboat Fund is an official charity, formerly CISPOTEL, established in 1866 by civil servants, and is run by the Civil Service. It raises funds through donations from both serving and retired employees, from Royal Mail and BT staff, and from legacies.

Since it was formed, The Lifeboat Fund has donated over £26 million to the RNLI, making it the most regular and significant donor for the institution. Civil servants across the UK organise fundraising collections and promote the lifesaving work of the RNLI. All money raised by the fund goes directly to support the RNLI.

In addition to providing (so far) 55 lifeboats of all different class types, the money is also put towards training, purchasing kit, and refurbishing lifeboat stations, most recently providing a £400,000 contribution to the new Tower lifeboat station and pontoon on the Thames.

== Numbering ==
The first 29 lifeboats share the designation (Civil Service) and numbers 1–11. When a boat was replaced, the new boat would receive the number from the previous boat, and often carry the same name. In the 1950s, this was changed, so that the boats were consecutively numbered, starting with Greater London II (Civil Service No. 30).

== Fleet ==
ON (Note: ON is the RNLI's Official Number of the boat.)	Op. No. (Note: Op. No. is the RNLI's Operational Number of the boat carried on the hull.)	Name	C.S.No.	Class	In service	Station	Comments
Pre-464	–	Civil Service	(No. 1)	32-foot Self-righting (P&S)	1866–1878	Wexford	(Note: Not numbered, but it was the first Civil Service funded lifeboat. Later named Harriott Forteath at Whitby)
301	–	Civil Service No. 1	No. 1	34-foot Self-righting (P&S)	1878–1897	Wexford No. 2	(Note: Later named Helen Blake at Fethard)
415	–	Civil Service No. 1	No. 1	40-foot Self-righting (P&S)	1898–1925	Margate No. 2	
688	–	The Lord Southborough	No. 1	45-foot Watson	1925–1951; 1951–1955	Margate; Relief fleet	
Pre-604	–	Charles Dibdin	No. 2	37-foot Self-righting (P&S)	1875–1888	Tynemouth	
204	–	Charles Dibdin	No. 2	37-foot Self-righting (P&S)	1889–1905	Tynemouth	
552	–	Charles Dibdin	No. 2	43-foot Self-righting (P&S)	1905–1932	North Deal	
762	–	Charles Dibdin	No. 2	41-foot Beach Type	1933–1959	Walmer	
284	–	Civil Service No. 3	No. 3	37-foot Self-righting (P&S)	1877–1899	Portpatrick	
437	–	Civil Service No. 3	No. 3	37-foot Self-righting (P&S)	1900–1922; 1922–1924; 1924–1926; 1926–1927	Portpatrick; Relief fleet; Montrose; Relief fleet	
704	–	Greater London	No. 3	Ramsgate	1928–1941; 1941–1943; 1943–1945; 1945–1955; 1955–1957	Southend-on-Sea; Relief fleet; Yarmouth; Southend-on-Sea; Relief fleet	
34	–	Civil Service No. 4	No. 4	40-foot Self-righting (P&S)	1884–1895	Walmer	(Note: Damaged beyond repair, 1895)
394	–	Civil Service No. 4	No. 4	40-foot Self-righting (P&S)	1897–1912	Walmer	(Note: Later in Reserve fleet to 1919, and at Selsey as Reserve No. 3, and then as James William and Caroline Courteney at Fowey)
756	–	Civil Service No. 4	No. 4	35ft 6in Self-righting motor	1932–1948	Whitehills	(Note: Damaged beyond repair, 1948)
867	–	Lady Scott	No. 4	46-foot 9in Watson	1949–1981; 1981–1986	Portrush; Relief fleet	
80	–	Civil Service No. 5	No. 5	34-foot Self-righting (P&S)	1886–1905	Maryport	
544	–	Civil Service No. 5	No. 5	38-foot Watson (P&S)	1905–1931	Maryport	
753	–	Civil Service No. 5	No. 5	45-foot 6in Watson	1932–1950; 1950–1956; 1956–1958	Donaghadee; Port St Mary; Relief fleet	
273	–	Civil Service No. 6	No. 6	42-foot Self-righting (P&S)	1890–1895	Douglas No. 2	(Note: Wrecked, 1895)
384	–	Civil Service No. 6	No. 6	42-foot Self-righting (P&S)	1896–1924	Douglas	
784	–	Civil Service No. 6, Swn-Y-Mor	No. 6	46-foot Watson	1936–1963; 1964–1967; 1967–1972	St Davids; Eyemouth; Relief fleet	
289	–	Civil Service No. 7	No. 7	42-foot Self-righting (P&S)	1890–1895	Kingstown No. 2	(Note: Damaged beyond repair, 1895)
409	–	Dunleary	No. 7	45-foot Watson	1898–1913	Kingstown No. 2	
658	–	Dunleary	No. 7	45-foot Watson	1919–1938; 1938–1939	Kingstown; Relief fleet	(Note: Transferred to Lytham St Annes in 1939, Renamed Dunleary without Civil Service No.7 designation)
828	–	The Princess Royal	No. 7	46-foot Watson	1939–1968; 1968–1969; 1969–1976	Hartlepool; Humber No. 2; Relief fleet	
853	–	Winston Churchill	No. 8	46-foot 9in Watson	1948–1979; 1979–1982	Blyth; Relief fleet	
884	–	St Cybi	No. 9	52-foot Barnett Mk I	1950–1980; 1981–1986	Holyhead; Relief fleet	
897	–	St. Andrew	No. 10	41-foot Watson	1952–1959; 1959–1961; 1961–1968; 1968–1973; 1973–1976; 1976–1977; 1977–1982	Whitehills; Relief fleet; Girvan; Arklow; Relief fleet; Girvan; Relief fleet	
888	–	North Foreland	No. 11	46-foot 9in Watson	1951–1978; 1978–1981	Margate; Relief fleet	
921	–	Greater London II	No. 30	46-foot 9in Watson	1955–1976; 1977–1989	Southend-on-Sea; Beaumaris	
920	–	Dunnet Head	No. 31	47-foot Watson	1956	Thurso	(Note: Dunnet Head (Civil Service No. 31) was destroyed by a fire on 10 December 1956 at the boathouse in Thurso, in its first year on service. It was replaced by Pentland (Civil Service No. 31), keeping the same Civil Service number, but this time funded entirely by the RNLI.)
940	–	Pentland	No. 31	47-foot Watson	1957–1970; 1970–1974; 1974–1985; 1986–1990	Thurso; Relief fleet; The Mumbles; Workington	(Note: Provided by the RNLI to replace Dunnet Head (ON 920))
948	–	Charles Dibdin	No. 32	42-foot Watson	1959–1975; 1975–1977; 1977–1979; 1979–1982; 1982–1988	Walmer; Relief fleet; Eastbourne; Aldeburgh; Relief fleet	
952	–	Duke of Cornwall	No. 33	52-foot Barnett Mk II	1960–1984; 1984; 1984–1989	Lizard-Cadgwith; Padstow; Relief fleet	
971	–	Joseph Soar	No. 34	47-foot Watson	1963–1985; 1986–1988; 1988–1990	St Davids; Dunbar; Shoreham Harbour	
987	70-001	Charles H. Barrett	No. 35	Clyde	1966–1968; 1968–1975; 1975–1988	Trials; Clovelly; Relief fleet	
1026	44-008	Eric Seal	No. 36	Waveney	1974–1996	Eyemouth	Eric Seal
1037	54-03	Edward Bridges	No. 37	Arun	1975–1994	Torbay	
1046	37-33	Silver Jubilee	No. 38	Rother	1978–1991; 1991–1993	Margate; Relief fleet	
–	B-527	Percy Garon	No Number	B-class (Atlantic 21)	1976–1986; 1986–1996; 1996; 1996–1998; 1998	Southend-on-Sea; Relief fleet; Red Bay; Relief fleet; Arran (Lamlash)	(Note: The 1981 Report of the Civil Service and Post Office Lifeboat Fund has Percy Garon listed as No 39. However, 52-16 Richard Evans was designated No. 39 in 1981, Percy Garon now designated (Civil Service) with no number.)
1070	52-16	Richard Evans	No. 39	Arun	1981–2000; 2000–2003	Portrush; Relief fleet	
1095	47-004	St Cybi II	No. 40	Tyne	1985–1997; 1997–2006	Holyhead; Relief fleet	
1167	12-009	The Princess Royal	No. 41	Mersey	1990–2015; 2015–2016	St Ives; Relief fleet	
1204	14-06	Windsor Runner	No. 42	Trent	1995–2004; 2004–2008; 2008; 2008–	Blyth; Relief fleet; Dunbar; Relief fleet	
1237	17-17	Fraser Flyer	No. 43	Severn	1999–	Relief fleet	
–	E-001	Public Servant	No. 44	E-class Mk1	2002–2012	Tower	
–	H-003	The Hunstanton Flyer	No. 45	Hovercraft	2003–	Hunstanton	
–	D-654	Angel of Holyhead	No. 46	D-class (IB1)	2005–2016; 2017–2024	Holyhead; Boarding Boat (BB-654)	
–	D-655	Guardian Angel	No. 47	D-class (IB1)	2005–2015; 2015–	Relief fleet; Training	
–	B-806	Mudeford Servant	No. 48	B-class (Atlantic 85)	2006–2024	Mudeford	
–	D-697	Stranraer Saviour	No. 49	D-class (IB1)	2008–2019; 2019–	Stranraer; Boarding Boat (BB-697)	
–	B-826	Sgt. Bob Martin	No. 50	B-class (Atlantic 85)	2008–	Poole	
–	B-837	Charles Dibdin	No. 51	B-class (Atlantic 85)	2009–	New Brighton	
–	D-738	David Roulston	No. 52	D-class (IB1)	2010–2022; 2022–2024	Portrush; Relief fleet	
1353	13-46	Duke of Edinburgh	No. 53	Shannon	2023–	Wells-next-the-Sea	
–	D-868	Mr Eric Sharpe	No. 54	D-class (IB1)	2022–	Cromer	

Pre ON numbers are unofficial numbers used by the Lifeboat Enthusiast Society to reference early lifeboats not included on the official RNLI list.

== See also ==
- List of RNLI stations
- List of former RNLI stations
- Royal National Lifeboat Institution lifeboats
