= Kingsdown Lifeboat Station =

Former RNLI lifeboat station in Kent, England

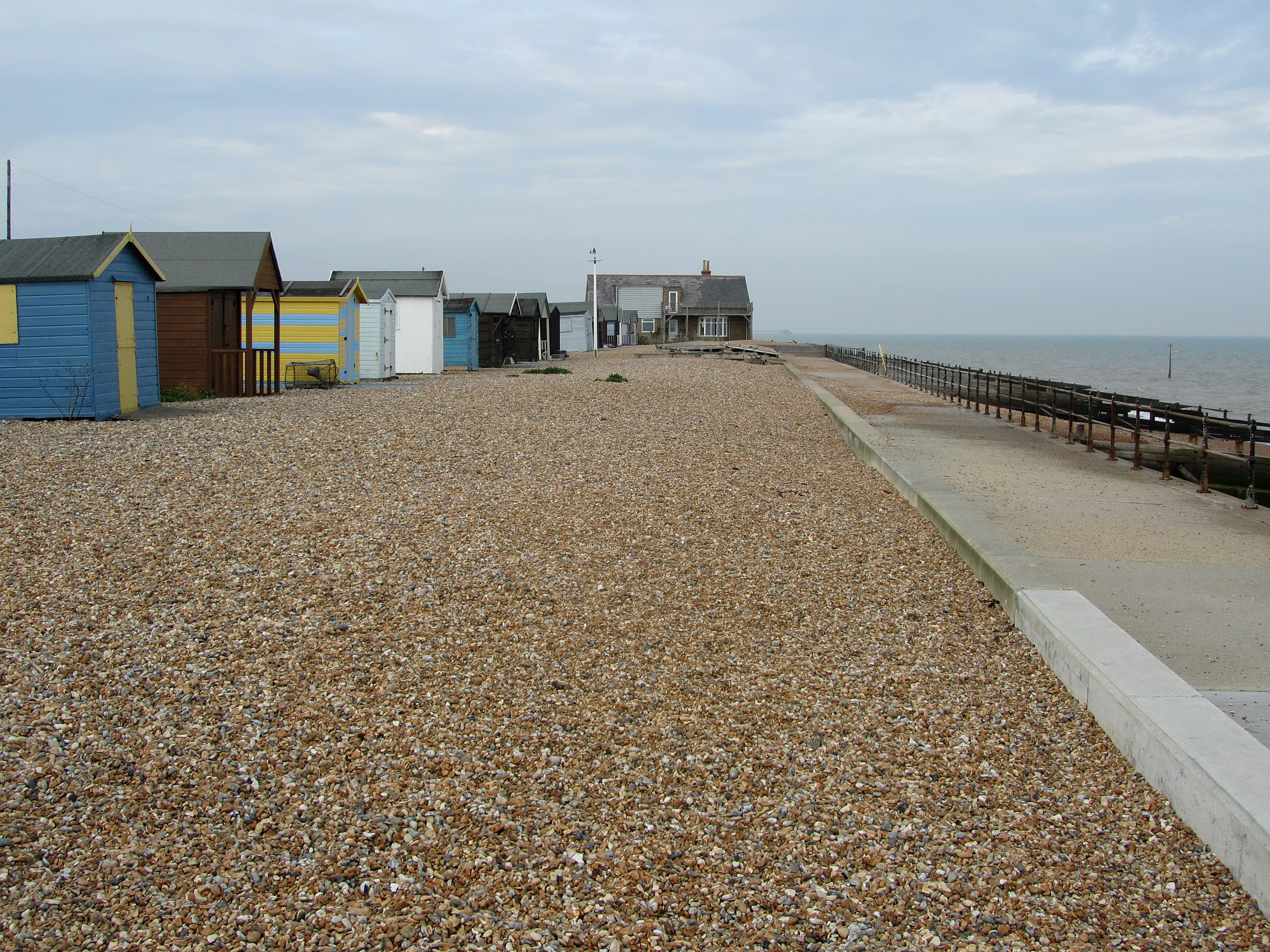
- Kingsdown Lifeboat Station.

- Location within Kent

General information
- Status: Closed
- Type: RNLI Lifeboat Station
- Location: Wellington Parade, Kingsdown, Kent, CT14 8AF, England
- Coordinates: 51°11′15.3″N 1°24′19.1″E
- Opened: 1866
- Closed: 1927

Kingsdown Lifeboat Station was located on the shore off Wellington Parade in Kingsdown, a village situated at the north end of the White Cliffs of Dover, Kent.

A lifeboat was first stationed at Kingsdown by the Royal National Lifeboat Institution (RNLI) in 1866. Along with Walmer and North Deal, it was one of three stations located along just three miles of coast.

Kingsdown Lifeboat Station was closed on 8 January 1927.

== History ==
The Goodwin Sands is a treacherous 10 mi (16 km) long sandbank, located a few miles off the Kent coast, and accounts for hundreds of shipwrecks. Such was the danger in this area, the RNLI placed three lifeboats along the coast at Walmer, North Deal, and the third one at Kingsdown. Kingsdown lifeboat station opened in 1866, with a boathouse costing £223, constructed by W & G Deane, and a 33-foot lifeboat named Sabrina (ON 210), built by Forrestt of Limehouse, funded by a gift from Mr William Ferguson of the London Stock Exchange. The lifeboat was transported to Kingsdown free of charge by the South Eastern railway company.

In a storm of 12 February 1870, Sabrina was launched to the Glendower, on passage from Java to Rotterdam. Picking up a line floated ashore from the vessel, the lifeboat was hauled to the wreck five times, and rescued all 23 people on board.

A new lifeboat costing £342 was provided in February 1871, a larger 36-foot boat, again named Sabrina for its donor. On 17 December, Walmer and Kingsdown lifeboats were launched to the steamship Sorrento, aground on the sands. Some of the Walmer crew went aboard in an attempt to jettison cargo in order to refloat the vessel, but then their lifeboat, tied up alongside the ship's boat, was damaged and swept away by huge wave. The Kingsdown lifeboat, which had been standing by, veered down to the vessel, and rescued the 22 crew and 10 Walmer lifeboatmen. Taking the lifeboat over to the Walmer lifeboat, the Walmer crew was transferred back aboard, along with some survivors of the Sorrento, both boats then making for Broadstairs.

As was often the case, donors were expected to make regular payments for the upkeep of the boat. If this was not forthcoming, the boat may be assigned funds from other donors, and renamed accordingly. In April 1882, Sabrina was renamed Charles Hargrave.

A replacement lifeboat for Kingsdown arrived on 31 December 1890, this time a 40-foot 12-oared boat built by Woolfe of Shadwell, costing £650. She was again named Charles Hargrave (ON 306).

History would repeat itself, when on 21 December 1907, six of the crew from the Walmer lifeboat were stranded on a vessel, the SS Cap Lopez, which was aground on the sands. Whilst attempting to jettison cargo to release the vessel, their lifeboat was damaged and swept away with the remaining crew aboard. The Kingsdown lifeboat rescued 14 crew of the Cap Lopez, and the six lifeboat men.

At 07:00 on 20 November 1916, both the North Deal, and then Ramsgate lifeboats, went to the aid of the Steamship Sibiria, both receiving damage and abandoning their rescue attempts. Called at 19:10, the Kingsdown lifeboat was towed to the wreck by a tug, and with great skill and effort, managed to rescue all 52 men from the vessel, returning to Kingsdown at 00:45. The American crew were accommodated in The Victory and the Zetland Arms public houses in Kingsdown. For this service, Coxswain James Pay and Second Coxswain William Sutton were awarded the Presidential Lifesaving Gold Medal from Woodrow Wilson.

The Charles Hargrave (ON 306) was replaced in 1926. It had been launched 86 times, and rescued 140 lives. The station received a 40-foot lifeboat Barbara Fleming (ON 480), formerly in service for 24 years at Porthdinllaen. However, plans were underway to station a motor-powered lifeboat on that part of the Kent coast, and Walmer was chosen of the three stations. Barbara Fleming was transferred to Walmer awaiting the arrival of a motor-powered lifeboat, and the Kingsdown station was closed on 8 January 1927.

In 61 years, the Kingsdown lifeboat had been launched 161 times, and 241 lives had been saved. The boathouse is now a private residence.

== Station honours ==
The following are awards made at Kingsdown.

- United States Presidential Lifesaving Gold Medal

James Pay, Coxswain – 1916
William Sutton, Second Coxswain – 1916

- RNLI Silver Medal

James Laming, Coxswain – 1907

James Pay, Coxswain – 1916

- The Thanks of the Institution inscribed on Vellum

James Laming, Coxswain – 1901

- £2, awarded by the Belgian Government

Each member of the Kingsdown Lifeboat – 1907

- Inscribed RNLI Telescope for 23 years service

Jarvist Arnold, Coxswain – 1888

== Roll of honour ==
In memory of those lost whilst serving Kingsdown lifeboat.

- Suffering a head injury on exercise, 1 April 1902, and died some months later.

Frederick Arnold (37)

== Kingsdown lifeboats ==
ON (Note: ON is the RNLI's Official Number of the boat.)	Name	Built	On station	Class	Comments
210	Sabrina	1865	1866−1871	33-foot Peake Self-righting (P&S)	(Note: 33-foot x 8-foot 1in (10-oared) Peake-class self-righting (P&S) lifeboat, gift of Mr and Mrs W. Ferguson, built by Forrestt of Limehouse, London, costing £275.)
Pre-550	Sabrina	1870	1871−1890	36-foot Self-righting (P&S)	(Note: 36-foot x 9-foot (12-oared) self-righting (P&S) lifeboat, gift of Mr W. Ferguson, built by Forrestt of Limehouse, London, costing £342.); Renamed Charles Hargrave in 1882.
Pre-550	Charles Hargrave	1870	1882–1890	36-foot Self-righting (P&S)	(Note: Legacy of Mr C. Hargrave of London.)
306	Charles Hargrave	1890	1890−1926	40-foot Self-righting (P&S)	(Note: 40-foot x 10-foot (12-oared) self-righting (P&S) lifeboat, legacy of Mr C. Hargrave of London, built by Woolfe of Shadwell, London, costing £650.)
480	Barbara Fleming	1901	1926−1927	40-foot Self-righting (P&S)	(Note: 40-foot x 10-foot 6in (12-oared) self-righting (P&S) lifeboat, legacy of Miss J. I. Fleming of Windermere, built by Thames Ironworks of Blackwall, London, costing £805 when new.); Reserve lifeboat No. 6K, previously at Porthdinllaen.

Pre ON numbers are unofficial numbers used by the Lifeboat Enthusiast Society to reference early lifeboats not included on the official RNLI list.

== See also ==
- List of RNLI stations
- List of former RNLI stations
- Royal National Lifeboat Institution lifeboats
