= Walmer Lifeboat Station =

RNLI Lifeboat station in Kent, England

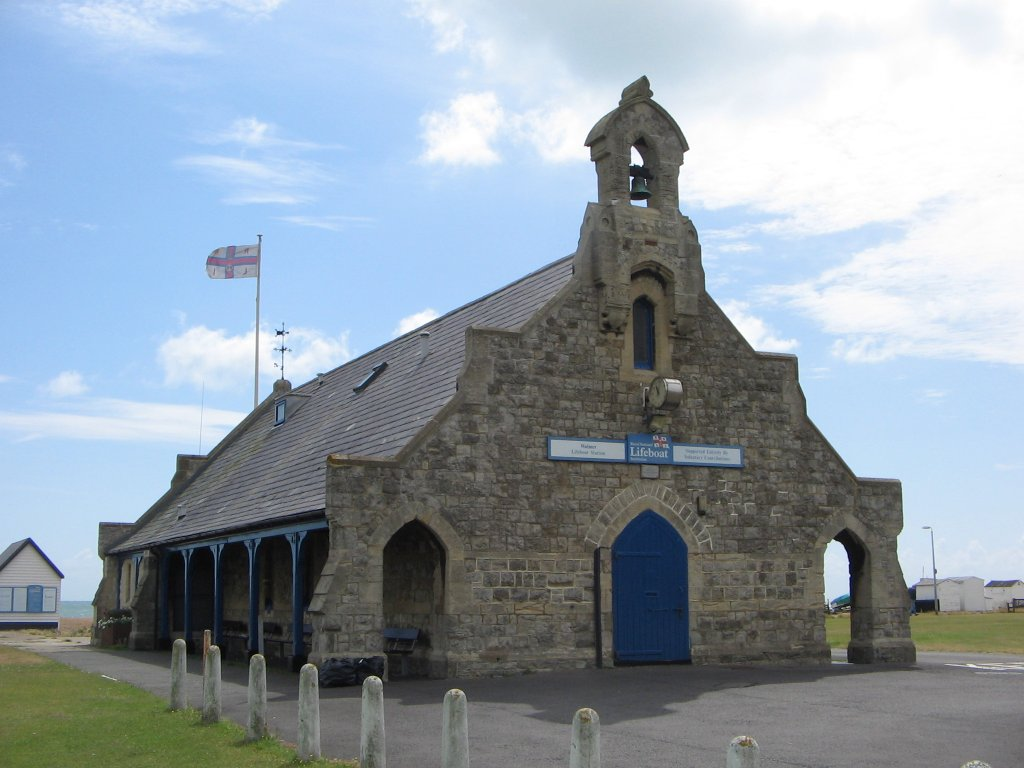
- 1871 Walmer Lifeboat Station

- Location within Kent

General information
- Type: RNLI Lifeboat Station
- Location: The Strand, Walmer, Kent, CT14 7DY, UK
- Coordinates: 51°12′48.71″N 1°24′10.66″E
- Opened: 1856
- Owner: Royal National Lifeboat Institution

Website
- Walmer RNLI Lifeboat Station

Walmer Lifeboat Station is located on The Strand, the promenade at Walmer, a town approximately 7 miles (11 km) north-east of Dover, in the county of Kent.

Following an appeal, a lifeboat station was established here by the Royal National Lifeboat Institution (RNLI) in 1856.

The station currently operates two Inshore lifeboats, the B-class (Atlantic 85) Hounslow Branch (B-950), placed on station in 2025, and the smaller D-class (IB1) Duggie Rodbard II (D-794), on station since 2016.

== History ==
Over two thousand ships are believed to have been wrecked on the Goodwin Sands, and the masts of several wrecks are visible from the shore at low tide. For many years, there were three lifeboats located along a 3 miles stretch of coast opposite the sands, North Deal, Kingsdown and Walmer.

=== 1800–1939 ===
Ever since its founding in 1824, the Royal National Institution for the Preservation of Life from Shipwreck (RNIPLS), later to become the RNLI in 1854, would award medals for deeds of gallantry at sea, even if no lifeboats were involved. In 1830, RNIPLS Gold and Silver Medals were awarded, for the rescue of 13 crew from the ship Mountaineer, and three Deal boatmen, on 24 November 1829.

In 1856, the RNLI issued an appeal to place a lifeboat at Walmer, highlighting the dangers of the Goodwin Sands to international trade through the Port of London. One member of the Royal Thames Yacht Club offered to pay half the cost of a lifeboat, if the remaining club members raised the remainder. A site for a boathouse was provided by landowner Mr Frederick Leath, and a wooden boathouse was constructed, costing £186-11s-0d. A 29-foot 6in self-righting 'pulling and sailing' (P&S) lifeboat (one with oars and sails), costing £160-2s-6d, was built by Forrestt of Limehouse, and arrived along with a launching carriage in Walmer in November 1856. The boat was named Royal Thames Yacht Club.

In 1871, a new stone-built boathouse was constructed, replacing the 1856 wooden boathouse, which was dismantled and reconstructed at North Deal.

Crew member Edward Young drowned in 1896, when he was trying to board the Steamship Trapian from the lifeboat.

The Walmer station was closed in 1912, but was reopened in 1927, when it was deemed the most suitable of the three local stations to operate the intended motor-powered lifeboat. Lifeboat Barbara Fleming (ON 480) was transferred from Kingsdown when that station was closed, and kept on a launching cradle at the head of the beach. Soon afterwards, from 1933, the station had its first motor lifeboat.

In 1933, the Beach Type motor lifeboat Charles Dibdin (Civil Service No.2) (ON 762) was placed on service. She would take part in the Dunkirk evacuation in 1940. In 1944, Coxswain Joseph Mercer was awarded the RNLI Bronze Medal for the rescue of 13 men from an anti-submarine boat stranded on the Goodwin Sands. In 26 years service to Walmer, Charles Dibdin (Civil Service No.2) (ON 762) would be launched 412 times, and save 241 lives.

=== Postwar to present ===
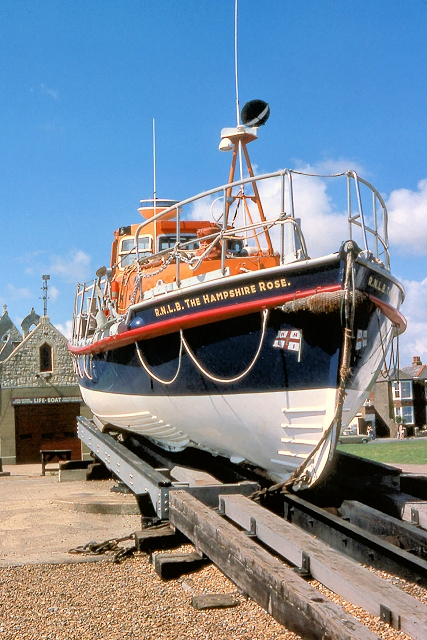
The Hampshire Rose (ON 1024)

The last All-weather lifeboat at Walmer was the RNLB Hampshire Rose (ON 1024). Launching 132 times in 15 years, she would save 57 lives.

In 1964, a D-class (RFD PB16) Inshore lifeboat had been placed at Walmer. When the Hampshire Rose was retired from service on 5 May 1990, she was replaced with the addition of a B-class (Atlantic 21) lifeboat, and Walmer was permanently established as an Inshore lifeboat station.

The boathouse was extended in 1992, to accommodate the Talus Atlantic 85 DO-DO launch carriage.

A new Atlantic 21, RNLB James Burgess (B-589), was also placed on service in 1992, in the same year as a visit by the Queen Mother as Lord Warden of the Cinque Ports, and on 22 January 1997 a new D-class (EA16) lifeboat, RNLB Lord Kitchener (D-514), was placed on service.

In 2026, Leslie George Coe, current Boathouse Manager, an RNLI volunteer of 71 years, who first volunteered at Walmer in 1955, was awarded both the British Empire Medal, and the Global Search & Rescue Excellence Awards - Lifetime Achievement Award.

== Station honours ==
The following are awards made at Walmer:

- RNIPLS Gold Medal
  - 1830, to H.M. Coastguards Capt. Philip Graham, RN, Lt. William Ward Percival Johnson, RN and Lt. William Stephen Watts, RN, for rescuing 13 crew from the ship Mountaineer and three boatmen from Deal, on 24 November 1829.
- RNIPLS Silver Medal
  - 1830, to John Durban, for rescuing 13 crew from the ship Mountaineer and three boatmen from Deal, on 24 November 1829.
- RNLI Silver Medal
  - 1859, to John Moss for saving one man from the tender of the lugger Stornoway on 19 December 1858.
  - 1948, to Coxswain Frederick Upton for rescuing 30 men, including two stowaways, and a dog from the steamer Silvia Onorato aground on the Goodwin Sands. The lifeboat spent 45 hours at sea.
  - 1952, to Coxswain Frederick Upton, (Second-service clasp), for rescuing 38 men from the wreck of the steamer Agen that was aground on the South Goodwin bank.
- RNLI Bronze Medal
  - 1944, to Coxswain Joseph Richard Mercer, for the rescue of 13 from H.M. Anti-Submarine boat No.25, stranded on the Goodwins on 18 January 1944.
  - 1948, to Mechanic Cecil Cavell, for rescuing 30 men, including two stowaways, and a dog from the steamer Silvia Onorato aground on the Goodwin Sands. The lifeboat spent 45 hours at sea.
  - 1952, to Mechanic Cecil Cavell, (Second-service clasp), for rescuing 38 men from the wreck of the steamer Agen that was aground on the South Goodwin bank.
  - 1977, to Coxswain Bruce George Brown, for rescuing the four crew from the sinking cabin cruiser Shark, along with the Second Coxswain who had become trapped in the cabin.
- The Maud Smith Award 1948
  (for the bravest act of lifesaving during the year by a member of a lifeboat crew)
  - 1948, to Coxswain Frederick Upton.
- The Ralph Glister Award 1970
  (for the most meritorious service of the year performed by a rescue boat crew)
  - 1970, to Helm Cyril Williams and crew members Leslie Coe and Charles Taylor for rescuing two men cut off by the tide in a cave.
- The Thanks of the Institution inscribed on Vellum
  - 1969, to Helm Bruce Brown and crew members Cyril Williams and John Riley for rescuing four people cut off by the tide.
  - 1970, to Helm Cyril Williams and crew members Leslie Coe and Charles Taylor for rescuing two men cut off by the tide in a cave.
  - 1972, to Coxswain Henry Brown for saving the yacht Nell and her six crew, plus a cat.
  - 1991, to Helm Duane Brown for rescuing the three crew from the yacht Josse aground on Goodwin Sands.
  - 2002, to Helm Andrew Coe, and crew members Adam Cowell and Philip Brenchly, for the rescue of the 32-foot yacht Thai Thai off the Goodwin Sands.
- A Framed Letter of Thanks signed by the Chairman of the Institution
  - 1978, to Coxswain Bruce Brown and Second Coxswain Cyril Williams for refloating the vessel Elmela off the Goodwin Sands.
  - 1985, to Helm Anthony Evans for rescuing two men who were cut off by the tide after their canoe had capsized.
  - 1991, to crew members John Collins and Shaun East for the Josse rescue.
- Member, Order of the British Empire (MBE)
  - 2023 (NYH), to Denis Brophy, Lifeboat Operations Manager
- British Empire Medal
  - Leslie George Coe, Boathouse Manager – 2026
- Special Award
  - 1997, to Pat Hardman, for his 27½ years of volunteer work for the RNLI in Deal, in which time he saved 119 lives from shipwreck.
  - 2005, to Leslie George Coe, for his 50 years of volunteer work for Walmer Lifeboat during which time he served as a crew member and Head Launcher.
- Global Search & Rescue Awards - Lifetime Achievement Award
  - 2026, to Leslie George Coe, for 71 years service to the RNLI

== Roll of honour ==
In memory of those lost whilst serving Walmer lifeboat:

- Drowned whilst trying to board the SS Trapian of Hamburg from the lifeboat by a rope, 23 October 1896.

Edward Young, crew member (36)

- Collapsed and died on service to the Italian Steamship Santagata, 24 December 1950

James Rich, Bowman (58)

== Walmer lifeboats ==
=== Pulling and Sailing (P&S) lifeboats ===
ON (Note: ON is the RNLI's Official Number of the boat.)	Name	Built	On station	Class	Comments
Pre-300	Royal Thames Yacht Club	1856	1856–1861	29-foot 6in Peake Self-righting (P&S)	(Note: 29-foot 6in x 7-foot 6in (10-oared) Peake-class self-righting (P&S) lifeboat, gift of the Royal Thames Yacht Club, built by Forrestt of Limehouse, London, costing £169.); Later at Scarborough. Condemned in 1872.
Pre-381	Royal Thames Yacht Club	1860	1861–1871	37-foot Self-righting (P&S)	(Note: 37-foot x 8-foot 4in (12-oared) self-righting (P&S) lifeboat, gift of the Royal Thames Yacht Club, built by Forrestt of Limehouse, London, costing £160.); Capsized 5 January 1867.
Pre-561	Centurion	1871	1871–1884	36-foot Self-righting (P&S)	(Note: 36-foot x 9-foot 4in (12-oared) self-righting (P&S) lifeboat, anonymous gift of 'A Friend', via Mr G. Ashton of London, built by Forrestt of Limehouse, London, costing £356.); Returned to London.
34	Civil Service No.4	1884	1884–1895	40-foot Self-righting (P&S)	(Note: 40-foot x 10-foot (12-oared) self-righting (P&S) lifeboat, gift of the Civil service LB fund, built by Forrestt of Limehouse, London, costing £504.); Condemned and sold locally, 1896.
394	Civil Service No.4	1896	1897–1912	40-foot Self-righting (P&S)	(Note: 40-foot x 10-foot 4in (12-oared) self-righting (P&S) lifeboat, gift of the Civil service LB fund, built by Hansen of East Cowes, costing £649.); Transferred to Selsey.
Station Closed 1912–1927
480	Barbara Fleming	1902	1927–1933	40-foot Self-righting (P&S)	(Note: 40-foot x 10-foot 6in (12-oared) self-righting (P&S) lifeboat, legacy of Miss J. I. Fleming of Windermere, built by Thames Ironworks of Blackwall, London, costing £1,278 when new.); Previously at Porthdinllaen and Kingsdown. Sold in 1933.

Pre ON numbers are unofficial numbers used by the Lifeboat Enthusiasts' Society to reference early lifeboats not included on the official RNLI list.

=== Motor lifeboats ===
ON	Op.No. (Note: Op.No. is the RNLI's Operational Number of the boat carried on the hull.)	Name	Built	On station	Class	Comments
762	–	Charles Dibdin (Civil Service No.2)	1933	1933–1959	41-foot Beach Type	Sold 1959. Renamed Channel Rover. Last reported at Dover, April 1980.
948	–	Charles Dibdin (Civil Service No.32)	1959	1959–1975	42-foot Watson	Transferred to Eastbourne.
1024	37-32	The Hampshire Rose	1974	1975–1990	Rother	Transferred to the relief fleet. Later at Anstruther.

All-Weather Lifeboat withdrawn 1990, replaced with a B-class (Atlantic 21)
More post-service details can be found on the respective lifeboat class pages.

=== Inshore lifeboats ===
==== D-class ====
Op.No.	Name	On station	Class	Comments
D-14	Unnamed	1964	D-class (RFD PB16)	
D-26	Unnamed	1965	D-class (RFD PB16)	
D-24	Unnamed	1966	D-class (RFD PB16)	
D-135	Unnamed	1967–1970	D-class (RFD PB16)	
D-200	Unnamed	1971–1976	D-class (Avon S650)	
D-254	Unnamed	1977–1988	D-class (Zodiac III)	
D-363	Unnamed	1988–1997	D-class (EA16)	
D-514	Lord Kitchener	1997–2006	D-class (EA16)	
D-663	Duggie Rodbard	2006–2016	D-class (IB1)	
D-794	Duggie Rodbard II	2016–	D-class (IB1)	

==== B-class ====
Op.No.	Name	On station	Class	Comments
B-512	US Navy League	1990–1992	B-class (Atlantic 21)	
B-589	James Burgess	1992–2006	B-class (Atlantic 21)	
B-808	Donald McLauchlan	2006–2025	B-class (Atlantic 85)	
B-950	Hounslow Branch	2025–	B-class (Atlantic 85)	

=== Launch and recovery tractors ===
Op. No.	Reg. No.	Type	On station	Comments
T89	WEL 302S	Talus MBC Case 1150B	1988–1996	
T87	WEL 300S	Talus MBC Case 1150B	1996–2019	
T119	N470 XAW	Talus MB-H Crawler	2019–	

== See also ==
- List of RNLI stations
- List of former RNLI stations
- Royal National Lifeboat Institution lifeboats
