= Maryport Lifeboat Station =

Lifeboat station in Cumbria, England

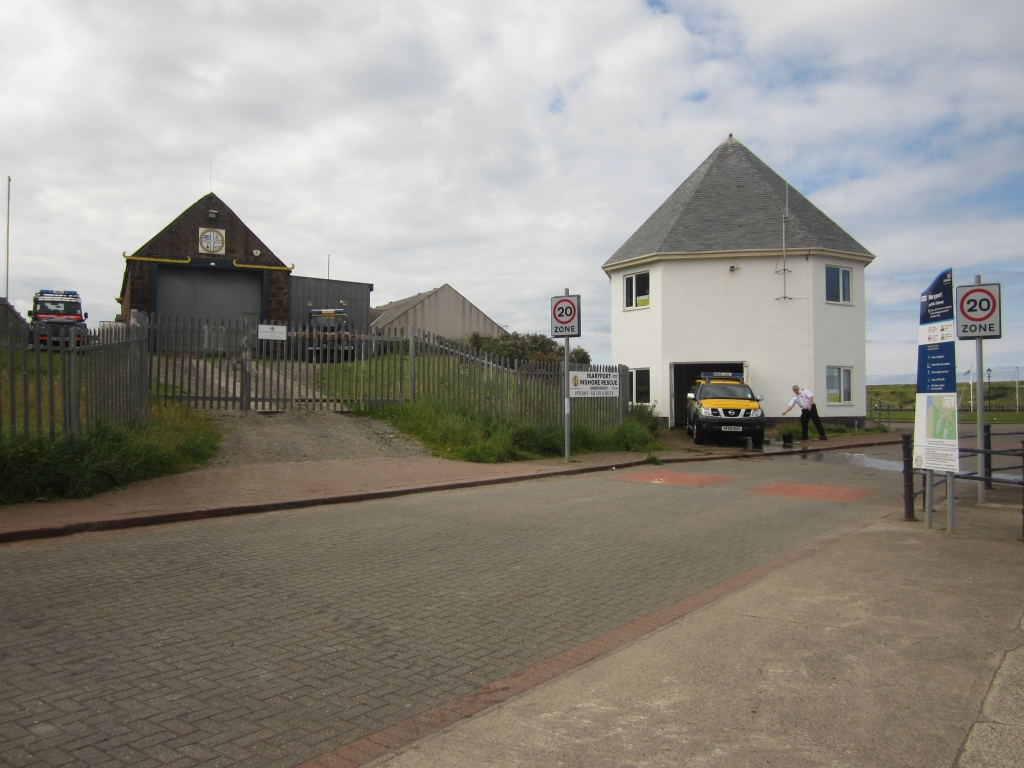
- Maryport Lifeboat Station in 2012

- Maryport, Cumbria

General information
- Status: Operational
- Type: Lifeboat Station
- Location: The Harbour, Marine Road, Maryport, Cumbria, CA15 8AY, England
- Coordinates: 54°42′54.9″N 3°30′17.8″W
- Opened: RNLI 1865–1949; Ind. 1978–Present

Website
- Maryport Rescue

Maryport Lifeboat Station, is located on Marine Road at the harbour in Maryport, a town approximately 27 miles (43 km) south-west of Carlisle, sitting just outside the Lake District National Park, and overlooking the Solway Firth on the north-west coast of Cumberland, Cumbria.

A lifeboat station was first established at Maryport in 1865, by the Royal National Lifeboat Institution (RNLI), but closed in 1949 after 84 years of operation.

In 1978, with local support, a lifeboat service was re-established at Maryport, initially known as Maryport Inshore Rescue Boat, now Maryport Rescue, and is housed in the old RNLI boathouse on Marine Road.

The station currently operates E-ON Spirit of Maryport, a 9 m (30 ft) Marine Specialist Technology (MST) Rescue 900 Rigid inflatable boat, on station since 2008, and a smaller Zodiac Inflatable boat, Maryport ERB.

== History ==
At a meeting of the RNLI committee of management on Thursday 2 February 1865, two letters of 6 December and 15 December 1864 were read, from H. Lindsay, Collector of Customs at Maryport. He advised of the considerable trade through the port, highlighting that between 15 and 20 vessels had been lost in the locality over a period of just seven years, and noted that there was considerable local support for a lifeboat to be placed at Maryport. The report of the visit to Maryport by Capt. John R. Ward, Inspector of Lifeboats, was also taken into consideration, and his recommendation that a lifeboat station should be established at Maryport was agreed.

It was reported in the October 1865 edition of the RNLI journal 'The Lifeboat', that the station had been established at Maryport. A new boathouse had been constructed, and a 32-foot self-righting 'Pulling and Sailing' (P&S) lifeboat, one with both sails and (10) oars had been supplied to the station, along with its launching carriage. The lifeboat had been transported to the station by the London and North Western, Lancashire and Yorkshire, and the Whitehaven and Furness Railway Companies.

The cost of the establishment had been defrayed with the gift of £550 from Mr Henry Dixson of Manchester, and at a ceremony held on the arrival of the lifeboat at Maryport, the boat was named Henry Dixson.

At 21:00 on 9 October 1878, the barque Carn Tual was seen in distress in the Solway Firth, at anchor riding out a gale. She had departed Maryport three days earlier. The Henry Dixson was launched, but now dark, and with no lights on the vessel, the lifeboat searched for her for 5 hours, with no success. The following day, the lifeboat set out again, this time in the tow of a Steam Tug, and nine men were brought ashore, one reportedly driven insane with fear. The Master and mate refused to leave the vessel, and it was later assisted by the Whitehaven lifeboat and a steamship, and taken into Whitehaven. For this service, and with other rescues taken into consideration, Coxswain John Webster was awarded the RNLI Silver Medal.

The next two lifeboats to be placed at Maryport are known as Civil Service lifeboats. They were provided by the Civil Service charity, an official charity, set up over 150 years ago by civil servants, and still in operation today. It raises funds through donations from both serving and retired employees, from legacies, and from fundraising events.

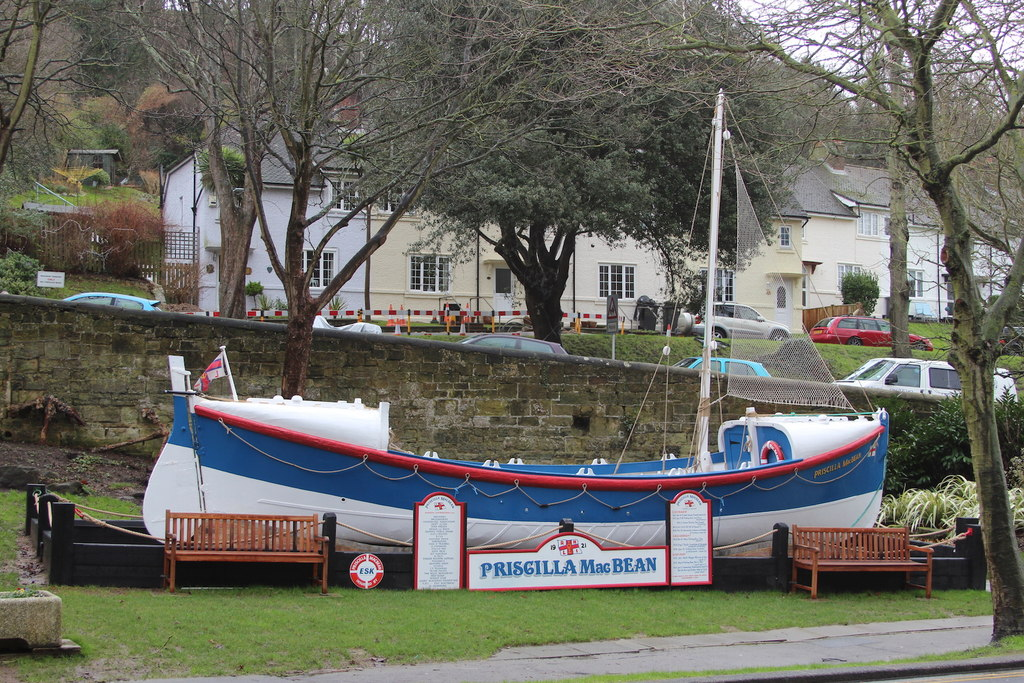
Priscilla Macbean (ON 655) on display at Hastings in 2015

In 1931, Maryport would receive their first motor-powered lifeboat. Built in 1921, the Priscilla Macbean (ON 655) had already served at Eastbourne and Kirkcudbright, and would serve just three years at Maryport before retirement.

On the 17 January 1934, the steamship SS Plawsworth of Newcastle-upon-Tyne dragged her anchors in a south west gale, and was driven ashore off Workington. Pricilla Macbean was launched at 12:00, and found the vessel ashore stern first, affording no shelter on either side to the lifeboat. The lifeboat was required to set her own anchor, and veer down to the vessel, but damaging the rudder in the process. Hindered with a poorly handling boat, the coxswain still managed to get the boat alongside for 42 minutes, and 13 crew were taken off, with the Master and four crew remaining aboard. The lifeboat landed the survivors at Workington, and after repairs, set out again. They arrived back to find the vessel had shifted, and although the lifeboat could no longer get close, the five people still aboard were now able to wade ashore at low tide. Coxswain Thomas Quayle Reay was awarded the RNLI Bronze Medal.

The last All-weather lifeboat to be placed at Maryport, arrived on station later in 1934. It is estimated over 20,000 people attended the naming ceremony, which was held on 27 September 1934. One man attending the event was Mr. John Murray, the last surviving member of the 1865 crew of the Henry Nixson, the first lifeboat at Maryport. The new lifeboat, a single-engine 35-foot 6in Liverpool-class, was funded from the legacy of Mr Joseph Braithwaite, a native of Wigton, Cumberland, and was named in his memory.

On the afternoon of 9 October 1940, the wind began to increase, and the herring drifters of Maryport made for home from the Solway Firth. Such was the speed of the increase in wind-speed, that one boat, the ''Mourne Lass, took only 5 minutes longer than the rest hauling in her nets, but lost an hour on the return journey, and was caught in the now gale force conditions. At 18:30, she was spotted in difficulty, approximately 2.5 miles (4.0 km) out. The lifeboat launched at 19:47, and struggled to even leave the harbour. Arriving with the Mourne Lass at 18:30, they found the crew exhausted, with the propeller fouled on the nets, and the mizzen sail in shreds. The lifeboat arrived back to harbour with the four crew aboard, and was guided in by the harbour master flashing his torch. Coxswain Thomas Quayle Reay received the second service clasp to his previously won RNLI Bronze Medal.

In 1948, silting of the Maryport harbour was causing difficulties. The RNLI decided to re-establish a station at Workington, previously closed in 1905, and closed Maryport Lifeboat Station in 1949. The lifeboat on station at the time of closure, Joseph Braithwaite (ON 773), was transferred to the Relief fleet, before being sold from service in 1952. It was last recorded in a back garden in Barry, South Wales in 2019.

=== 1970s ===
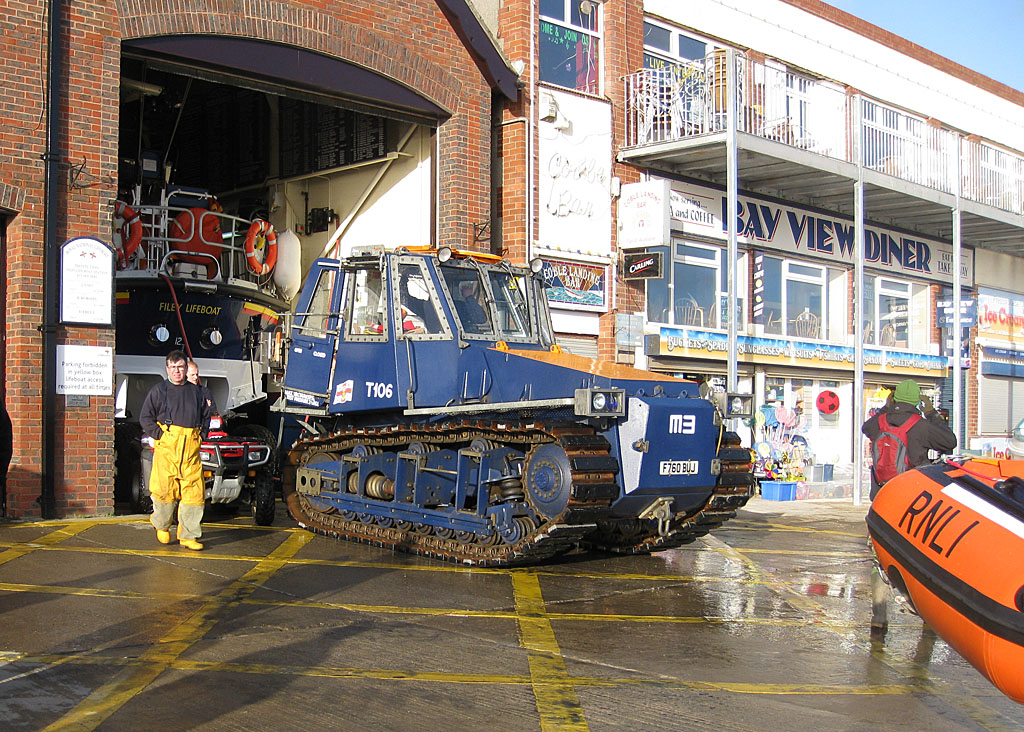
Talus MB-H T106 at Filey

The old Maryport lifeboat station building from 1865 was brought back into use as a rescue boathouse in 1978, with the establishment of the independently operated Maryport Inshore Rescue Boat. On 15 April 2013, work began on a £450,000 project to modify and extended the 1865 building, bringing it up to modern standards, to accommodate the needs of the current lifeboat service, Maryport Rescue.

In 2017, Maryport Rescue took delivery of a second-hand Talus MB-H amphibious tractor, acquired from the RNLI. The vehicle, originally built, and now refurbished, by Clayton Engineering, is completely watertight, can be fully submerged, and was originally designed for the towing and launching of Mersey-class All-weather lifeboats through water, sand and mud. This specific vehicle, T106, was previously in service at both Scarborough and Filey lifeboat stations between 1988 and 2013.

The service is co-ordinated by Belfast Coastguard, and has 'Declared Facility' status with H.M. Coastguard. Alongside the lifeboat, Maryport Rescue operates a Flood & Swiftwater Search & Rescue team, and works closely with Cumbria Police & Cumbria Fire & Rescue.

Maryport Rescue is a registered charity (No. 1113807), and is a member of the National Independent Lifeboats Association (NILA).

== Station honours ==
The following are awards made at Maryport:

- RNLI Silver Medal

John Webster, Coxswain – 1878

- RNLI Bronze Medal

Thomas Quayle Reay, Coxswain – 1934

Thomas Quayle Reay, Coxswain – 1941 (Second-Service clasp)

- The Thanks of the Institution inscribed on Vellum

Albert E. Jolley, motor mechanic – 1934

Herbert Rook, motor mechanic – 1941

- The King's Award for Voluntary Service

Maryport Rescue – 2023

== Maryport lifeboats ==
=== Pulling and Sailing (P&S) lifeboats ===
ON (Note: ON is the RNLI's Official Number of the boat.)	Name	Built	On station	Class	Comments
Pre-437	Henry Nixson	1865	1865−1886	32-foot Prowse Self-righting (P&S)	(Note: 32-foot x 7-foot 4in (10-oared) Prowse-class self-righting (P&S) lifeboat, legacy of Mr H. Nixson of Manchester, built by Forrestt of Limehouse, London, costing £210.)
80	Civil Service No.5	1886	1886−1905	34-foot Self-righting (P&S)	(Note: 34-foot x 7-foot 6in (10-oared) self-righting (P&S) lifeboat, gift of the Civil service LB fund, built by Woolfe of Shadwell, London, costing £297s.)
544	Civil Service No.5	1905	1905−1931	38-foot Watson (P&S)	(Note: 38-foot x 9-foot 4in (10-oared) Watson-class non-self-righting (P&S) lifeboat, gift of the Civil service LB fund, built by Thames Ironworks of Blackwall, London, costing £1,011.)

Station Closed, 1931
Pre ON numbers are unofficial numbers used by the Lifeboat Enthusiasts' Society to reference early lifeboats not included on the official RNLI list.

=== Motor lifeboats ===
ON	Name	Built	On station	Class	Comments
655	Priscilla Macbean	1921	1931−1934	35-foot Self-righting (motor)	(Note: 35-foot x 8-foot 6in self-righting (motor) lifeboat, legacy of Mr Macbean, built by J. Samuel White of Cowes, costing £6,623 when new.); Previously at Eastbourne and Kirkcudbright.
773	Joseph Braithwaite	1934	1934−1949	Liverpool	

=== Inshore lifeboats ===
Name	On station	Class	Comments
E-ON Spirit of Maryport	2008–	9 m (30 ft) MST 900 RIB	
Maryport ERB	2020–	4.3 m (14 ft) Zodiac Inflatable	

=== Vehicles ===
Name	Class	Reg No.	Comments
T106	Talus MB-H amphibious tractor	F760 BUJ	Previously at Scarborough and Filey
MaryRover 1	Landrover 110	PY14 GWX	
MaryRover 2	Landrover 110	PX60 UAB	

== See also ==
- Independent lifeboats in Britain and Ireland
- List of former RNLI stations
- List of RNLI stations
