= Margate Lifeboat Station =

RNLI lifeboat station in Kent, England

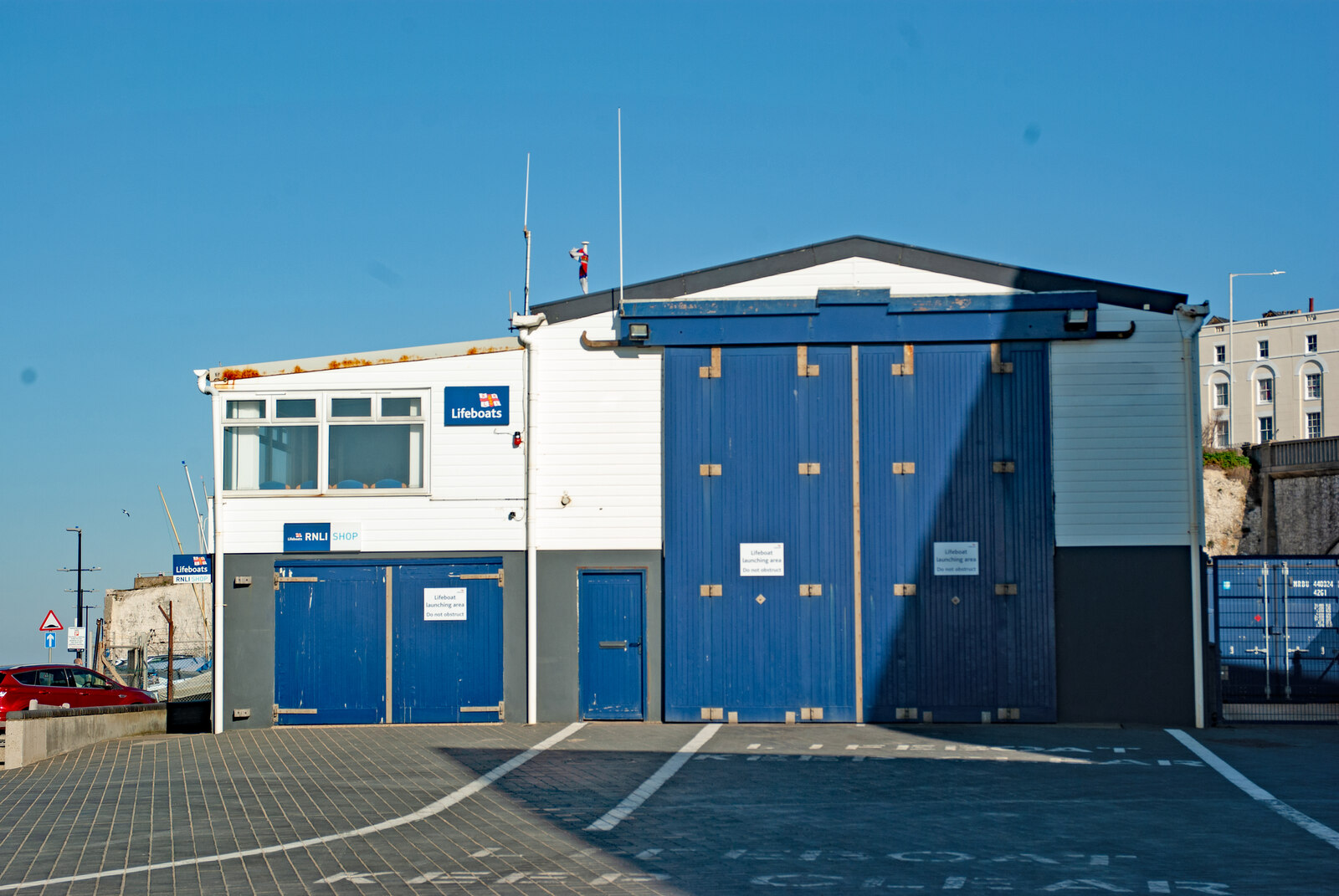
- Margate Lifeboat Station

- Location within Kent

General information
- Type: RNLI Lifeboat Station
- Location: Margate Lifeboat Station,, The Rendezvous,, Margate, Kent, CT9 1HG, England
- Coordinates: 51°23′30.0″N 1°22′57.9″E
- Opened: 1857
- Owner: Royal National Lifeboat Institution

Technical details
- Material: Atcost concrete prefab frame with brick block and plastic cladding.

Website
- Margate RNLI Lifeboat Station

Margate Lifeboat Station is located on The Rendezvous, in Margate, a seaside town on the Isle of Thanet peninsula, the north eastern corner of the English county of Kent.

A lifeboat was first placed at Margate in 1857, operated by the town council. Management of the station was transferred to the Royal National Lifeboat Institution (RNLI) in 1860.

The station currently operates two Inshore lifeboats, a B-class (Atlantic 85), Colonel Stock (B-930), on station since 2022, and the smaller D-class (IB1) Alfred Alexander Staden (D-841), on station since 2019.

== History ==
On 5 January 1857, in blizzard conditions, the American transatlantic ship Northern Belle ran aground off the Kent coast. Everyone aboard was rescued, in no small part due to the efforts of the Broadstairs lifeboats. However, the lugger Victory from Margate was capsized during her rescue efforts, and all nine crew were lost.

This disaster would galvanise support for a lifeboat in Margate, and by the end of 1857, there was not one, but two independent lifeboats in operation. The first was a 33-foot Whale Boat, built by White of Cowes, and operated by the Margate Boatmen's Company. The second was a 36-foot self-righting 'Pulling and Sailing' (P&S) lifeboat, one with sails and (9) oars, built by Waterman of Plymouth. As reported in the weekly "Star and Bell" news of Wednesday 30 September 1857, the boat, reportedly costing over £500, was presented to the town of Margate by Baroness Angela Burdett-Coutts. The boat was initially named Coutts, but was later known as Angela and Hannah.

However, it was later reported that subsequent trials of Angela and Hannah in rough weather destroyed all confidence of the local boatmen, who declared they would have no further trust for the boat. At a meeting of the RNLI committee of management on 2 February 1860, it was agreed that the RNLI would take over the management of the Margate lifeboat.

The Angela and Hannah was immediately withdrawn from station, and transported to Forrestt of Limehouse, London, for conversion, where she was stripped, altered and refitted to the usual RNLI standards, at a cost of approximately £250. The South Eastern Railway then transported the lifeboat and new carriage back to Margate, free of charge, where on Wednesday 10 October 1860, she was tested under oar and sail, to the great satisfaction of the local crew.

On 3 January 1861 the Margate committee proposed a design for a new boathouse to be located on land leased from the South Eastern and Chatham Railway company. The RNLI inspector instead suggested that the existing boathouse on the stone pier be refitted to suit the RNLI's needs. The reworked boathouse was opened on 31 August that year.

Angela and Hannah was replaced in 1866, with a new 34-foot 10-oared lifeboat, built by Forrestt at a cost of £300-13s-8d. The lifeboat arrived in the town on 4 August, along with its new carriage. transported free of charge by the South Eastern Railway. A new lifeboat house had been constructed, at a cost of £185-10s-0d. The new lifeboat and carriage were funded by the "Quiver Lifeboat Fund", a donation to the Institution of £1878-1s-11d, contributed by the subscribers to The Quiver magazine, via the publishers Cassell, Petter and Galpin, and the editor, the Rev. Thomas Teignmouth Shore.

The donation initially funded three lifeboats, Quiver No.1 for Queenstown (Cobh), Quiver No.2 for Margate, and Quiver No.3 for Southwold. It would transpire that No.1 was actually placed at Margate, No.2 at Southwold, and No.3 at Queenstown (Cobh).

On 7 August 1866, the new boat was drawn in procession through the town, to the shore. In the presence of a large crowd of over 15,000, the lifeboat was formally presented to the Institution by the Rev. Teignmouth Shore, and then named Quiver No. 1 by Mrs Bateman, wife of the Rev. Canon Bateman, Vicar of Margate.

Between 1866 and 1883, Quiver No.1 was launched 34 times and saved 70 lives. In 1883, the station would receive its second lifeboat from the Quiver Lifeboat Fund, a 37-foot lifeboat again named Quiver No.1, which was launched 68 times, and saved 61 lives, between 1883 and 1898.

In 1867 it became apparent that the launch system and location of the station on the stone pier had a few shortfalls. Among them was that on several occasions the horses that were used to launch the boat had refused to face the heavy sea after being buffeted about by the fierce waves, thus causing delayed launches. On 4 February 1898 another heavy sea took the eight launching horses off their feet and threw them around, some went under the launching carriage resulting in the loss of four of the horses.

On the 2 December 1897, the vessel Persian Empire of West Hartlepool collided with another vessel off Margate Sands. At 05:00, in a north-east gale, both the RNLI lifeboat Quiver No. 1 and the independent lifeboat Friend To All Nations were launched to their aid. Quiver reached the vessel, and gave assistance, returning to shore after a service of 31 hours. However, the Friend To All Nations capsized while crossing the spit of Nayland Rock, with the loss of nine of the 13 crew.

=== Move to Margate Jetty ===
On 9 December 1896, it was suggested that the RNLI lifeboat should be moved to Margate Jetty, where two slipways would be built to provide an operating capacity of two lifeboats, at an estimated cost of £3,045. A storm damaged the slipways during construction, revealing shortfalls in the design which necessitated revisions to the height of the slipway decks. Subsequent disagreements between the RNLI, the local lifeboat committee and the Margate Pier and Harbour Company further delayed the completion. The slipways, designated Stations 1 and 2, were declared open by politician James Lowther on 14 May 1898. That same day, two new lifeboats were handed over to the station and were christened Civil Service No.1 (ON 415) and Eliza Harriet (ON 411).

By 21 March 1925, construction of a new boathouse and slipway to accommodate a new 45-foot Watson motor lifeboat was completed. The boathouse was 61-feet long and 22-feet wide, and was fitted with a petrol-driven winch, and dynamo to provide lighting.

The new lifeboat, the Lord Southborough (ON 688), arrived from London, where she had been on exhibition as Grace Darling at the British Empire Exhibition at Wembley. Prior to her arrival at Margate, she was involved in a collision at Gravesend with a shrimping boat, which ultimately sank. This episode turned out to be the first service the new lifeboat performed, when she rescued the boat's two crewmen.

In 1927 the No. 1 Station was closed and the Eliza Harriet was retired after 30 years service.

=== World War II ===
The Second World War saw the station fall under the control of the Royal Navy, although day-to-day running was still carried out by the branch personnel. Coxswain Edward Parker was awarded the Distinguished Service Medal for his service in taking the Lord Southborough to the beaches during the Dunkirk evacuation. Following Dunkirk, the Margate Station found itself one of the busiest lifeboat stations during the Battle of Britain, along with Ramsgate.

=== 1950s–1970s ===
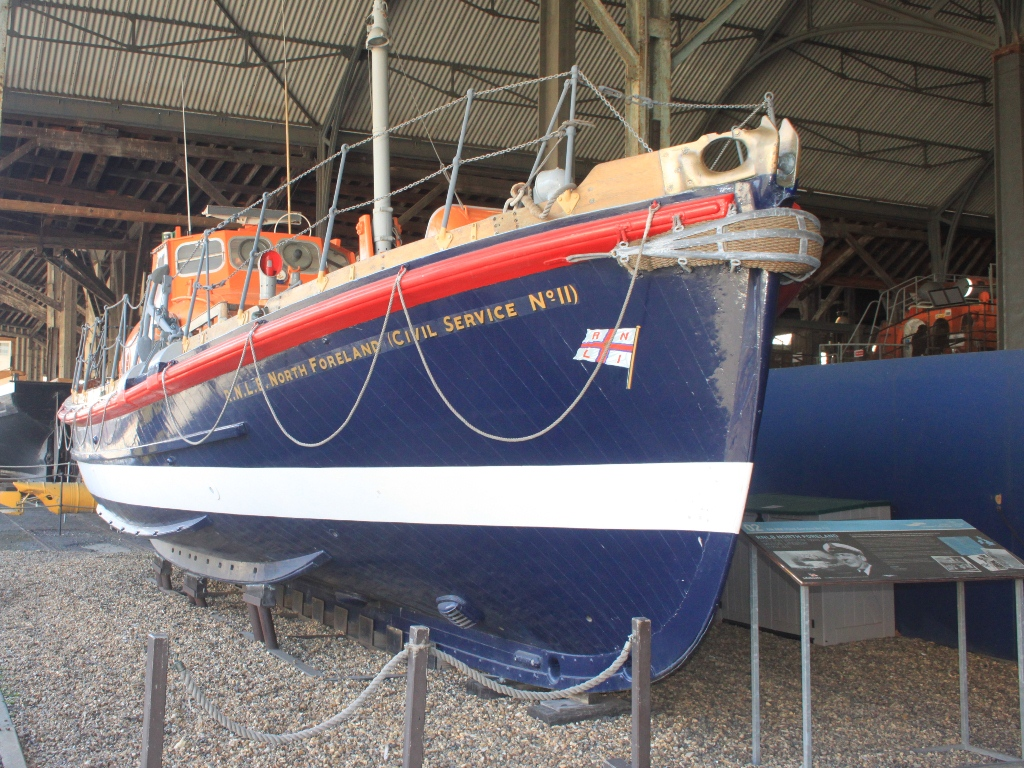
46-foot 9in Watson North Foreland (Civil Service No.11) at Chatham Historic Dockyard.

The Lord Southborough was retired from the station in 1951.

On 17 May 1951 the station took delivery of a new all-weather lifeboat named North Foreland (Civil Service No. 11) (ON 888), a 46-foot 9in Watson motor lifeboat. The boathouse later sustained damage following a severe storm in 1953, requiring the complete replacement of the floor.

On 20 May 1960, the Margate station celebrated its centenary under the control of the RNLI. Records show that during that period, the station's crew had rescued more than 1,800 people.

In 1964, in response to an increasing amount of water-based leisure activity, the RNLI placed 25 small fast Inshore lifeboats around the country. These were easily launched with just a few people, ideal to respond quickly to local emergencies. In 1966, the D-class (RFD PB16) Inshore inflatable lifeboat (D-99) was placed at Margate.

In September 1976, the Margate Pier and Harbour Company closed the iron jetty to the public, as it had become unsafe, but provision was made for the crew to access the lifeboat station. After several years of debate, it was decided that a new station would be built on shore, and a new carriage-launched Rother-class lifeboat would be supplied.

=== 1978 North Sea storm surge ===
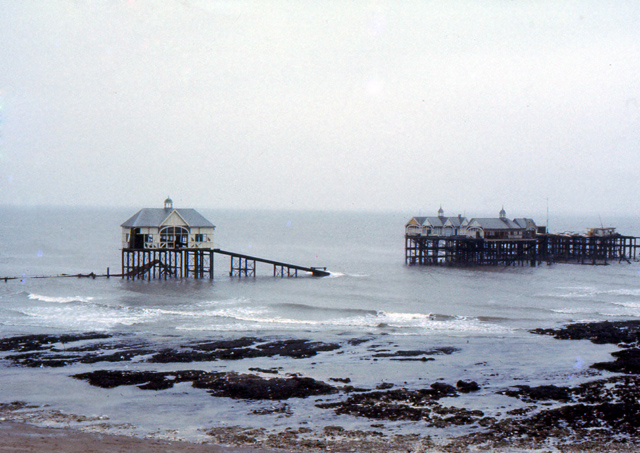
Margate Pier after January 1978 storm, showing isolated lifeboat station and iron jetty

On 11 January 1978 a violent storm with gale-force winds and waves hit the North Kent coast. This washed away most of the iron jetty, leaving just the boathouse and slipway with no access to the severely damaged lifeboat house from the shore. Members of the crew were airlifted to the boathouse by Royal Air Force helicopter to launch the North Foreland, which was stranded inside. The North Foreland was taken into Margate Harbour before being transferred to Ramsgate, where she operated until the new lifeboat and Margate station were ready for service. The inshore station had also sustained damage, and that was temporarily housed at Margate Police Station.

=== Since 1978 ===
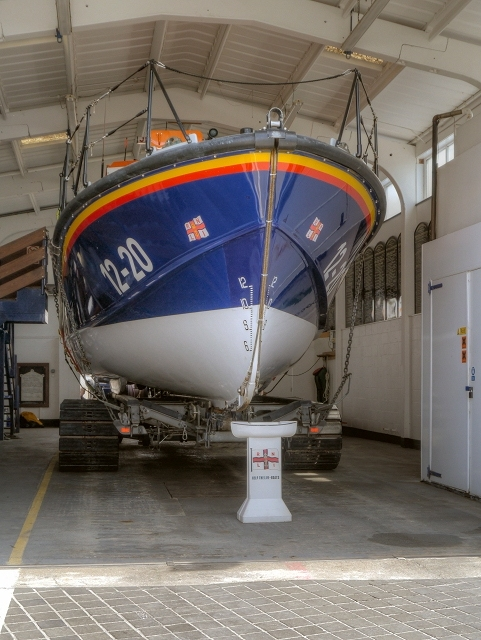
RNLB Leonard Kent (ON 1177)

Work began on the present lifeboat station in March 1978, and was completed in August 1978. The new Rother-class lifeboat Silver Jubilee (ON 1046) was placed on station in November 1978. The naming ceremony took place on 21 November 1979, carried out by HRH Princess Margaret, standing in for HRH Princess Alexandra, who was unable to make the journey that day.

In the mid-1980s, the Margate station committee split into two organizations; the Margate RNLI Fundraising Branch and the Margate Lifeboat Operational Committee, which handles day-to-day operations. In 1991 the Silver Jubilee was replaced by the Mersey-class lifeboat 12-20 Leonard Kent (ON 1177). The naming ceremony was conducted on 21 May 1992, this time by HRH Princess Alexandra, who had missed the opportunity of naming the previous boat through illness.

Arriving on station in 1989, a new D-class (EA16) Inshore lifeboat was formally handed over to the station on 6 July 1990. Funded by Mr John Davenport of Surrey, the boat was named Tigger (D-400) after his dog. The boat was replaced by Tigger Too (D-545) in May 1999, and Tigger Three (D-706) in 2008.

In 1998, the boathouse was enlarged and upgraded.

On 11 November 2011, HRH Queen Elizabeth II visited Margate, where she toured the old town, and stood for the two minute silence at 11.00. Later as Patron of the RNLI, she visited the Lifeboat Station and met the crew.

Following difficulties with planning permission for a new station building to house a Shannon-class lifeboat, the Mersey-class lifeboat Leonard Kent (ON 1177) was withdrawn in May 2021, replaced by a B-class (Atlantic 85) Rigid Inflatable Inshore lifeboat (RIB). All-weather lifeboat (ALB) cover is provided by the flanking stations at Sheerness and Ramsgate.

On 1 October 2024, the Talus MB-H amphibious tractor (T107), primarily used to launch All-weather lifeboats, and on service at Margate since 2013, was withdrawn, and replaced with a specifically designed RIB launch vehicle, Talus MB-4H Hydrostatic (Mk.3) tractor (TW65H). Margate is the first station to receive the new Mk.3 version, which was formally placed on service on 4 October 2024 after 3 days of training. A New Holland Boomer 2035 tractor (TA-103) is used to launch the D-class.

== Station honours ==
The following are awards made at Margate.

- Distinguished Service Medal
  Coxswain Edward Drake Parker – 1940
- RNLI Silver Medal
  William Grant, Coxswain – 1871
  William Grant, Coxswain – 1877 (Second-Service clasp)
  William Crawford, Honorary Secretary – 1893
  Stephen Clayson, Assistant Coxswain, Margate No. 1 – 1905
  Denis Richard Price, Coxswain – 1952
- RNLI Bronze Medal
  Alfred Robert Wilson, crew member – 1951
- The Maud Smith Award 1951
  (for the bravest act of lifesaving during the year by a member of a lifeboat crew)
  Alfred Robert Wilson, crew member – 1951
- The Thanks of the Institution inscribed on Vellum
  Edward Drake Parker, Coxswain – 1940
  Thomas D. Harman, Second Coxswain – 1940
  Henry Parker, Bowman – 1940
  Edward J. Jordan, Motor Mechanic – 1940
  William B. Mackie, Assistant Motor Mechanic – 1940
  Dennis Price, Signalman – 1940
  John Letley, crew member – 1940
  Alfred Morris, crew member – 1940
  Arthur Ladd, crew member – 1940
  Edward E. Parker, crew member – 1940
  William Hopper, crew member – 1940
  Denis Richard Price, Coxswain – 1959
  David E. G. Lacey, Helm – 1969
  Christopher Weatherly Brown, crew member – 1969
  Albert Joseph Scott, Helm – 1971
- Member, Order of the British Empire (MBE)
  Guy William Addington – 2022QBH

== Roll of honour ==
In memory of those lost whilst serving Margate lifeboats.

- Lost when the lugger Victory capsized, after launching to assist the American ship Northern Belle, 5 January 1857

Frederick Bath
Abraham Busbridge
John Emptage
William Emptage
Charles Fuller

Henry Paramore
John Smith
George Smith
Isaac Solly

- Lost when the private lifeboat Friend To All Nations capsized, on a joint call with the Margate lifeboat Quiver No.1, to the vessel Persian Empire of West Hartlepool, 2 December 1897

Henry Richard Brockman, Coxswain (50)
Robert Ernest Cook (26)
William Philpot Cook Sr. (55)
William Philpot Cook Jr. (28)
Edward Robert Crunden (31)

John Benjamin Dike (41)
William Richard Gill (36)
George Robert William Ladd (37)
Charles Edward Troughton, Supt. Ambulance Corps (40)

- Suffered a fit and died, whilst sorting out gear after the lifeboat launched, 4 March 1904
  Thomas Ashley, coastguard (45)
- Died from the effects of exposure on service in the private lifeboat Friend To All Nations, 1906
  Joseph John Jones (41)
- Died of a heart attack after cycling to the station for a service call, 6 November 1949
  Benjamin A. D. Frost (41)

== Margate lifeboats ==
=== Private lifeboats ===
Name	Built	On station	Class	Comments
Friend To All Nations	1857	1857–1877	33-foot Non-self-righting Whale Boat	(Note: 33-foot x 6-foot 9in (12-oared) Whale boat, built by White of Cowes.); Capsized 7 January 1866, wrecked 26 November 1877.
Coutts	1857	1857–1860	36-foot Turner Self-Righting (P&S)	(Note: 36-foot x 6-foot 8in (12-oared) self-righting lifeboat, gift of Miss A. Burdett-Coutts and Margate Town Council, built by Waterman of Plymouth, to a design by Geo. Turner of Devonport.); Later named Angela and Hannah.
Friend To All Nations	1878	1878–1897	Non-self-righting Whale Boat	(Note: 10-oared Whale boat of unknown dimensions, gift of Mr T. Gray of Birchington, built by White of Cowes.); Capsized 2 December 1897 with the loss of nine crew.
Friend To All Nations	1898	1898–1928	Non-self-righting Whale Boat	(Note: Whale boat of unknown dimensions.); Motor-powered in 1922.
Friend To All Nations	1898	1939–1940	Non-self-righting Whale Boat	

=== No. 1 Station ===
ON (Note: ON is the RNLI's Official Number of the boat.)	Name	Built	On station	Class	Comments
Pre-308	Angela and Hannah	1857	1860–1866	36-foot Turner Self-Righting (P&S)	(Note: Modified to RNLI standards by Forrestt of Limehouse, London, at a cost of £250.)
Pre-476	Quiver No. 1	1866	1866–1883	34-foot Self-Righting (P&S)	(Note: 34-foot x 8-foot 3in (10-oared) self-righting (P&S) lifeboat, gift of The Quiver magazine LB fund, built by Forrestt of Limehouse, London, costing £301.)
265	Quiver No. 1	1883	1883–1898	37-foot Self-Righting (P&S)	(Note: 37-foot x 9-foot (12-oared) self-righting (P&S) lifeboat, gift of The Quiver magazine LB fund, built by Woolfe of Shadwell, London, costing £430.)
411	Eliza Harriet	1898	1898–1927	40-foot Self-Righting (P&S)	(Note: 40-foot x 10-foot 6in (12-oared) self-righting (P&S) lifeboat, gift of Mrs E. H. Kidd of Bedlington, built by Roberts of Mevagissey, costing £769.)

No.1 Station closed, 1927
Pre ON numbers are unofficial numbers used by the Lifeboat Enthusiasts' Society to reference early lifeboats not included on the official RNLI list.

=== No. 2 Station ===
ON	Name	Built	On station	Class	Comments
415	Civil Service No. 1	1898	1898–1925	40-foot Self-Righting (P&S)	(Note: 40-foot x 10-foot 6in (12-oared) self-righting (P&S) lifeboat, gift of the Civil service LB Fund, built by Roberts of Mevagissey, costing £726.)

=== Motor lifeboats ===
ON	Op. No. (Note: Op. No. is the RNLI's Operational Number of the boat carried on the hull.)	Name	Built	On station	Class	Comments
688	–	Lord Southborough (Civil Service No.1)	1924	1925–1951	45-foot Watson	Sold 1955. Last reported at Southampton in 2001.
888	–	North Foreland (Civil Service No.11)	1951	1951–1978	46-foot 9in Watson	Since 1996, on display in the RNLI Heritage Collection at Chatham Historic Dockyard
1046	37-33	Silver Jubilee (Civil Service No.38)	1977	1978–1991	Rother	Sold 1994. At Yonkers Yacht Club, on the River Hudson, NY, December 2025.
1177	12-20	Leonard Kent	1991	1991–2021	Mersey	At Newcastle from 2022. Retired from service 18 December 2025, the last of the Mersey class ALB's in service with the RNLI.

=== Inshore lifeboats ===
==== D-class ====
Op. No.	Name	On station	Class	Comments
D-99	Unnamed	1966–1975	D-class (RFD PB16)	
D-182	Unnamed	1975–1984	D-class (RFD PB16)	
D-294	Bill Mellis	1984–1989	D-class (RFD PB16)	
D-400	Tigger	1989–1999	D-class (EA16)	
D-545	Tigger Too	1999–2008	D-class (EA16)	
D-706	Tigger Three	2008–2019	D-class (IB1)	
D-841	Alfred Alexander Staden	2019–	D-class (IB1)	

==== B-class ====
Op. No.	Name	On station	Class	Comments
B-815	Peterborough Beer Festival III	2021–2022	B-class (Atlantic 85)	
B-930	Colonel Stock	2022–	B-class (Atlantic 85)	

=== Launch and recovery tractors ===
Op. No.	Reg. No.	Type	On station	Comments
T88	WEL 301S	Talus MBC Case 1150B	1978–1991	
T111	H926 PUJ	Talus MB-H Crawler	1991–2003	
T109	G296 KUX	Talus MB-H Crawler	2003–2013	
T107	F415 EAW	Talus MB-H Crawler	2013–2024	
TW65H	HF24 BWO	Talus MB-4H Hydrostatic (Mk.3)	2024–	

== See also ==
- List of RNLI stations
- List of former RNLI stations
- Royal National Lifeboat Institution lifeboats
