= Broadstairs Lifeboat Station =

Former RNLI lifeboat station in Kent, England

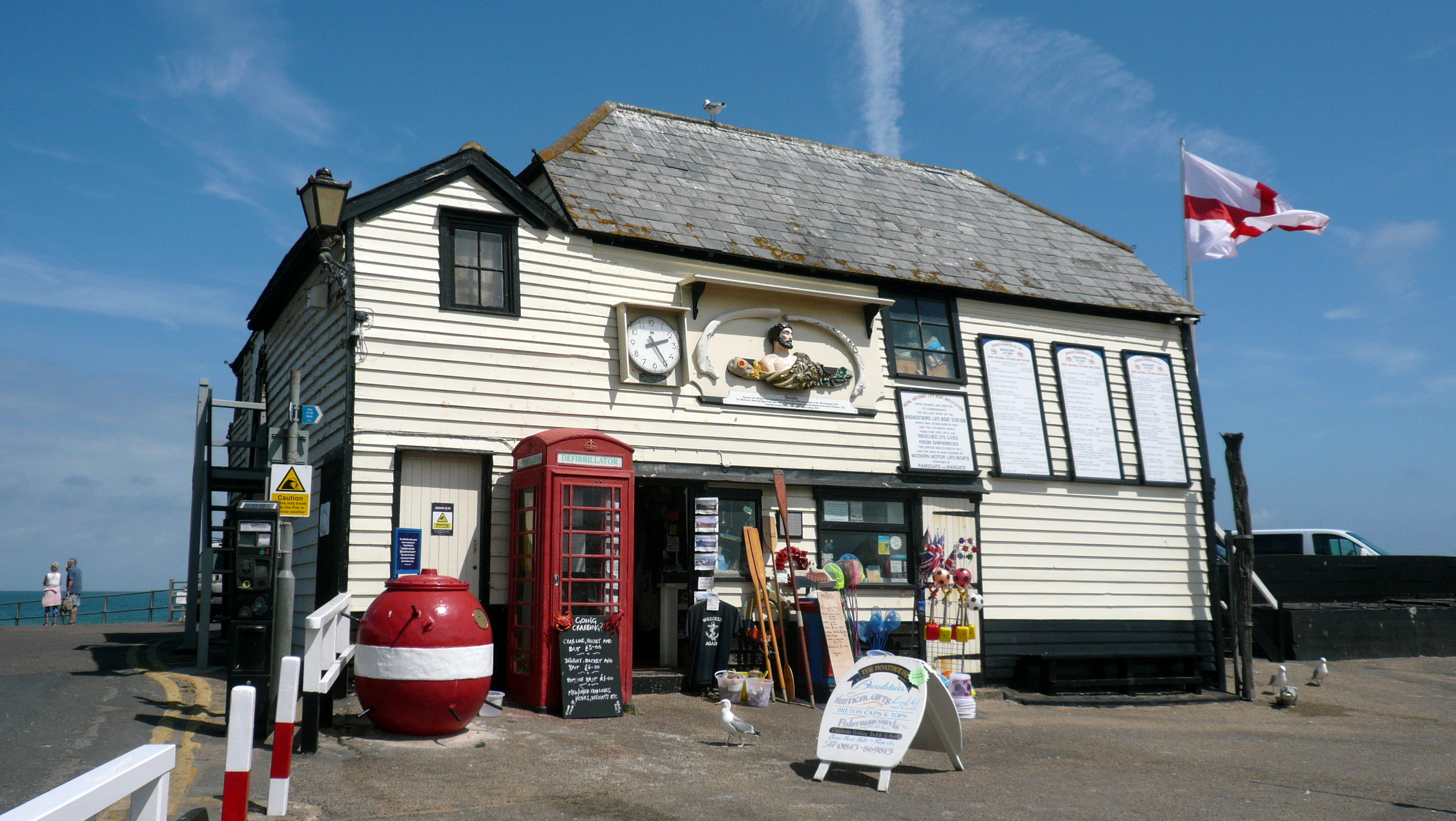
- Broadstairs Lifeboat Shed

- Location within Kent

General information
- Status: Closed
- Type: RNLI Lifeboat Station
- Location: The Harbour, Broadstairs, Kent, England
- Coordinates: 51°21′33.1″N 1°26′43.5″E
- Opened: 1850
- Closed: 1912

Broadstairs Lifeboat Station was a former lifeboat station in Kent, England. It was rather unusual, as it never had a boathouse, although a building was provided by the Harbour Commissioners in which to store all the equipment. The lifeboat was kept under a tarpaulin, and was stored on the pier at Broadstairs, a harbour town on the east coast of Kent.

A lifeboat was first placed at Broadstairs in 1850, when one was presented to the town by former residents and lifeboat manufacturers Thomas and John White, latterly of Cowes.

Management of the station was taken over by the Royal National Lifeboat Institution (RNLI) in 1868.

Broadstairs Lifeboat Station was closed in 1912.

== History ==
In 1850, Thomas White and his son John, of Cowes, presented one of their Lamb and White type lifeboats to their former home town of Broadstairs. The boat was of the type they supplied to The Peninsular and Oriental Steam Navigation Company, non-self-righting, as Thomas preferred a more buoyant and stable craft. Thomas founded the boat building company J. Samuel White, which would come to be well known for the manufacture of lifeboats for the RNLI. He was descended from John White who had married Mary Culmer of Broadstairs in 1721, she from a family known for its boatbuilding, and one of the founding families of Broadstairs. This first boat would be named Mary White.

The lifeboat would first be called on the 6 March 1851, by the Walmer coastguard, to a brig wrecked on the Goodwin Sands in gale-force conditions. Arriving at the vessel, Coxswain Solomon Holborn and lifeboatman George Castle went aboard the vessel, and seven of the 10 crewmen were helped to the lifeboat. At that point, the brig turned over, and the line parted, with the lifeboat swept away from the vessel. Holborn and Castle realised their situation, and jumped into the sea, but were soon rescued. The three remaining crew members of the vessel were lost. It may be that the lifeboat was named later, or maybe extraordinary coincidence, but the lost vessel, on her maiden voyage from Sunderland to Smyrna (now İzmir), was also named Mary White. Each of the eight lifeboatmen was awarded the RNIPLS Silver Medal.

In 1853, Thomas and John White would present a second lifeboat to Broadstairs, the 30-foot Culmer White. Both the Culmer White and the Mary White would be involved in a remarkable rescue in 1857. At 15:00 in a storm on 5 January, the 1000 ton American transatlantic vessel Northern Belle was in trouble, and dropped anchor off Kingsgate. The Broadstairs lifeboat Mary White was taken 2 miles (3.2 km) overland, in case she was required. A crowd onshore watched the vessel, expecting her to be driven ashore. The lugger Victory of Margate with 12 crew made an attempt to reach the vessel, but was hit by an exceptional wave, and to the horror of all those watching, disappeared from view. All aboard were lost. The lugger Ocean then managed to get 5 men aboard to help save the Northern Belle. The following morning, the vessel had been driven onto the rocks, and 23 men could be seen lashed to the remaining rigging. The Mary White set out, and rescued seven men. The Culmer White had also been transported to Kingsgate, and rescued a further 14 men. She then set out again, and recovered the last two men aboard, the Pilot and Captain. One lifeboatman, George Emptage, was aboard the Mary White, and then also made the two trips on the Culmer White. On the direction of American President Franklin Pierce, the 21 lifeboatmen from Broadstairs were awarded the United States Presidential Silver Medal For Lifesaving.

Seafront with lifeboats, Broadstairs, Kent

By 1867, both lifeboats were found to be deteriorating, and the boatmen made a request of the RNLI to establish a station at Broadstairs, which was agreed. In April 1868, a 36-foot self-righting 'Pulling and Sailing' (P&S) lifeboat, one with sails and (12) oars, constructed by Forrestt of Limehouse, arrived in Broadstairs. The lifeboat was provided from a gift by Mrs. Collins of London, and named Samuel Morrison Collins at a ceremony on 25 August, in memory of her son, who had been lost at sea. To aid with launching the boat, a slipway was constructed from the side of the pier in 1869, costing £88-15-0d. Capt. James Elyard was appointed Honorary Secretary, and Jeremiah Walker was Coxswain.

It was not uncommon for Capt. James Elyard to be one of the crew of the Broadstairs lifeboat, but even following promotion to Major, duties which required him to relinquish his role of Honorary Secretary, he still took an active part, and remained on the committee. The lifeboat launched to the aid of the schooner Lion of Goole on 12 March 1876, and managed to save the vessel and crew of four, bringing them to Dover harbour. For this, and 17 other services, which had resulted in saving 49 lives, Maj. James Elyard, of the 2nd Royal Surrey Militia, was awarded the RNLI Gold Medal.

The Samuel Morrison Collins provided exceptional service at Broadstairs, launched 84 times in her 20-years on station, and saving 129 lives. The boat was replaced in 1888 by the Christopher Waud, Bradford (ON 189), which would record 52 launches in just 8 years, and save 46 lives. When flares were seen off the shore at North Foreland, the lifeboat was launched, and found the brigantine Douse ashore on the rocks. Her six crewmen were rescued, and landed at Ramsgate.

In 1896, the Christopher Waud, Bradford was found to be suffering from rot, and was withdrawn. Reserve No.3 lifeboat, (ON 190), was placed on service for just one year, but in that time was launched 13 times, and saved 16 lives.

A new boat was sent to the station in 1897, built by Rutherford of Birkenhead. When completed, the boat was towed to Bristol in extremely poor conditions, and then transited the Avon canal to the River Thames and on to Broadstairs. On arrival on 15 March 1897, it was found to have been badly damaged on the journey, and was immediately returned to London, for repairs at Thames Ironworks, finally returning to station on 17 September 1897. Provided from the legacy of Miss Ivy Webster, of Exeter, the boat was named at her request, the Francis Forbes Barton (ON 399). The Francis Forbes Barton would record 115 launches, and save 77 lives in the 15 years she was on service at Broadstairs.

With the decline in the number of sailing vessels, and with three lifeboats nearby, two at Margate, and one at Ramsgate, it was decided that there was sufficient cover for the area. Despite an exceptional service record, launching 269 times in a 62-year period, and saving 275 lives, Broadstairs Lifeboat Station was closed on 18 July 1912. The Francis Forbes Barton (ON 399) would later serve at North Deal. The boat is currently (December 2024) in storage at Ramsgate awaiting restoration.

== Station honours ==
The following are awards made at Broadstairs

- RNLI Gold Medal

Maj. James Elyard, 2nd Royal Surrey Militia, Committee Member – 1876

- RNIPLS Silver Medal

Solomon Holborn, Coxswain – 1851
George Castle – 1851
George Wales – 1851
John Crouch – 1851
Edward Chittenden – 1851
John Wales – 1851
Paul Sackett Hansell – 1851
Richard Crouch – 1851

- RNLI Silver Medal

Capt. James Elyard, Honorary Secretary – 1869

William Foreman, Coxswain – 1892

Jethro Miller Pettit, Coxswain – 1901

- United States Presidential Lifesaving Medal – Silver

James Bene – 1857
John Castle – 1857
George Castle – 1857
John Cowell – 1857
Alfred Emptage – 1857
Edward Emptage – 1857
George Emptage – 1857
Robert Gilbert – 1857
William Hiller – 1857
Thomas Holborn – 1857
Fred Laurence – 1857
Jethrow Miller – 1857
Robert Miller – 1857
William Ralph – 1857
Robert Parker – 1857
James Rowse – 1857
John Sandwell – 1857
Thomas Sandwell – 1857
Robert Simpson – 1857
William Wales – 1857
Jeremiah Walker – 1857

- The Thanks of the Institution inscribed on Vellum

Capt. James Elyard, Honorary Secretary – 1872

== Roll of honour ==
In memory of those lost whilst serving Broadstairs lifeboat.

- Died later of exposure, following a lifeboat demonstration at Faversham, 8 June 1901

Singleton Jethro Pettit, Bowman (31)

- Died of a heart attack during recovery of the lifeboat, 31 August 1907

Thomas Henry Wales, shore crew (76)

== Broadstairs lifeboats ==
=== Broadstairs Boatmen Company ===
Name	Built	On station	Class	Comments
Mary White	1850	1850–1868	29-foot 6in non-self-righting 'Whale-boat'	(Note: 29-foot 6in x 6-foot 6in (12-oared) Lamb & White non-self-righting 'Whale-boat', built and gifted by John and Thomas White of Cowes.)
Culmer White	1853	1853–1868	30-foot non-self-righting 'Whale-boat'	(Note: 30-foot x 8-foot 4in (12-oared) Lamb & White non-self-righting 'Whale-boat', built and gifted by John and Thomas White of Cowes.)
Dreadnought	1855	1855–1857	20-foot non-self-righting 'Whale-boat'	(Note: 20-foot (6-oared) Lamb & White non-self-righting 'Whale-boat', built by John and Thomas White of Cowes.)

=== RNLI lifeboats ===
ON (Note: ON is the RNLI's Official Number of the boat.)	Name	Built	On station	Class	Comments
Pre-519	Samuel Morrison Collins	1868	1868–1888	36-foot Self-righting (P&S)	(Note: 36-foot x 9-foot 6in (12-oared) self-righting (P&S) lifeboat, gift of Mrs Collins of London, built by Forrestt of Limehouse, London, costing £330.)
189	Christopher Waud, Bradford	1888	1888–1896	39-foot Self-righting (P&S)	(Note: 39-foot x 9-foot (12-oared) self-righting (P&S) lifeboat, gift og the late Mr C. W. Waud of Bradford, built by Woolfe of Shadwell, London, costing £588.)
190	The Brothers	1888	1896–1897	39-foot Self-righting (P&S)	(Note: 39-foot x 9-foot (12-oared) self-righting (P&S) lifeboat, an anonymous gift, built by Woolfe of Shadwell, London, costing £588.); Reserve lifeboat No.3, previously at St Annes.
399	Francis Forbes Barton	1896	1897–1906	40-foot Self-righting (P&S)	(Note: 40-foot x 10-foot 4in (12-oared) self-righting (P&S) lifeboat, legacy of Miss I. Webster of Exeter, built by Rutherford of Birkenhead, costing £697.)
291	Christopher North Graham	1890	1906–1907	39–foot Self-righting (P&S)	(Note: 39-foot x 9-foot (12-oared) self-righting (P&S) lifeboat, gift of Mrs North Graham and family of Brighton, built by Forrestt of Limehouse, London, costing £577.); Reserve lifeboat No.3, previously at Sizewell and Thorpeness.
399	Francis Forbes Barton	1896	1907–1912	40-foot Self-righting (P&S)	

Pre ON numbers are unofficial numbers used by the Lifeboat Enthusiast Society to reference early lifeboats not included on the official RNLI list.

== See also ==
- List of RNLI stations
- List of former RNLI stations
- Royal National Lifeboat Institution lifeboats
