= North Deal Lifeboat Station =

Former RNLI lifeboat station in Kent, England

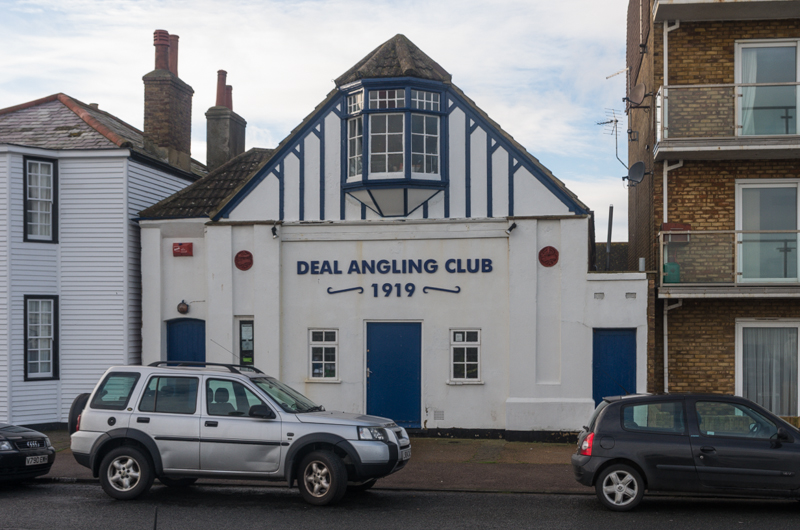
- 1883 North Deal Lifeboat House.

- North Deal, Kent

General information
- Status: Closed
- Type: RNLI Lifeboat Station
- Location: 13 The Marina, Deal, Kent, CT14 6NF, England
- Coordinates: 51°13′49.4″N 1°24′15.0″E
- Opened: 1865
- Closed: 1932

North Deal Lifeboat Station was located on Beach Street (now No.13 The Marina), in the seaside town of Deal, in the county of Kent.

A lifeboat was first stationed at North Deal by Royal National Lifeboat Institution (RNLI) in 1865. Along with Walmer and Kingsdown, it was one of three stations located along three miles of coast.

With a motor-powered lifeboat due to arrive at Walmer, North Deal Lifeboat Station was closed in September 1932.

== History ==
The Goodwin Sands is a treacherous 10 mi (16 km) long sandbank, located a few miles off the Kent coast, and accounts for hundreds of shipwrecks. Such was the danger in this area, the RNLI placed three lifeboats along the coast at Walmer, Kingsdown, and one at North Deal.

After eight years of operating a lifeboat at Walmer, it had been found that in certain conditions of wind and tide, the lifeboat was struggling to reach some vessels in distress, and it was decided to place extra lifeboats north and south of Walmer. A 40-foot 'Pulling and Sailing' (P&S) lifeboat, one with sails and (12) oars, was built by Forrestt of Limehouse, arriving on 15 February 1865. A boathouse was constructed on the north side of Deal by Denne & Wise, costing £350, with the station to be known as North Deal Lifeboat Station. In 1864, marine artist Edward William Cooke RA FRS FZS FSA FGS had donated £200 to the RNLI towards the provision of a lifeboat in Deal, and as per the wishes of the donor, the boat was named Van Kook, a reference to his Dutch patrons.

On 11 November 1877, the Van Kook was launched to the French brig D'Artagnan aground on Brake Sands. The lifeboat was smashed against the stern of the vessel causing several holes, but the five crew were rescued. Whilst still out, the Hedvig Sophia was seen in distress, and the lifeboat then rescued a further 11 men, and the Captains wife. On 1 December 1877, the Van Kook would launch to the full-rigged vessel Crusader, on passage from Québec to South Shields, and rescue 22. Coxswain Robert Wilde was awarded the RNLI Silver Medal, the first of 10 that would be awarded to North Deal lifeboatmen.

Donors could be expected to make regular payments for the upkeep of the boat. If this was not forthcoming, the boat may be assigned funds from other donors, and renamed accordingly. In 1881, following the death of Edward Cooke, Van Kook was renamed Mary Sommerville after a bequest by Miss M. C. Sommerville of Genoa. The next two boats would carry the same name, the first of these, Mary Sommerville (ON 178), arriving at North Deal on 26 August 1887.

In 1883, the road outside the station was reconstructed and raised, preventing access in or out of the boathouse. A new boathouse was constructed at a cost of £439-2s-10d.

The new Mary Sommerville (ON 178) was not well liked, the North Deal boatmen having a multitude of complaints. Only a year later, on 31 October 1888, it was replaced with a 42-foot 12-oared lifeboat, again named Mary Sommerville (ON 227). Trials took place, and all was well. This boat would serve until 1905, launching 103 times, and rescuing 160 lives. Returning the old boat to London, the lifeboatmen were signalled by the crew of the Tongue Lightship, and took aboard 13 men who had survived the sinking of their vessel Albatross two days earlier.

The Charles Dibdin (Civil Service No.2) (ON 552) was placed on service at North Deal in 1905. In 1912, both Broadstairs and Walmer stations were closed, but with the outbreak of World War I, it was felt that another lifeboat may be needed to cover the Goodwin Sands.

A second 40-foot lifeboat was stationed at North Deal, the Frances Forbes Barton (ON 399), and lifeboatman William Stanton was appointed coxswain. The Frances Forbes Barton was the legacy of a Miss Webster in 1897 to the boatmen of Broadstairs, and had been stationed at Broadstairs until the closure, during which time it had been taken out on 77 launches and saved 115 lives. The boat would remain on station at North Deal until 1921. In 1927, Walmer Lifeboat Station would reopen when Kingsdown was closed.

After 67 years service, 420 launches, and 859 lives saved, North Deal Lifeboat Station was closed in September 1932. The lifeboat on station at the time, Charles Dibdin (Civil Service No.2) (ON 552) was retired and sold, and was last reported as a yacht in 2019. The lifeboat house still stands, and is currently in use by 'Deal Angling Club (1919)'.

== Station honours ==
The following are awards made at Deal.

- Gold Watch and Chain, presented by the President of the United States

William Adams, Coxswain – 1919

- United States Presidential Lifesaving Gold Medal

William Wells – 1919
Thomas Adams – 1919
Thomas Adams Jr. – 1919
Frank Adams – 1919
Thomas Cribben – 1919
John Webb – 1919
Frank Budd – 1919
Richard Riby – 1919
Robert Holbourn – 1919
Samuel Trice – 1919
Walter Redsull – 1919
Matthew Hoill – 1919
Alfred Jordan – 1919
Ernest May – 1919

- RNIPLS Silver Medal

John Middleton, Master of the Po – 1824
Benjamin Norris, Master of the Canning – 1824
Ockady Minter, Master of the Ox – 1824
Edward Erridge, Master of the Sparrow – 1824

James Bailey, Boatman – 1829

Stephen Collard, Cinque Port Pilot – 1849

- RNLI Silver Medal

Thomas Trott, crew member of Diana – 1860

Robert Wilds, Coxswain – 1877

Robert Wilds, Coxswain – 1882 (Second-Service clasp)
Richard Roberts, Assistant Coxswain – 1882

Richard Roberts, Coxswain – 1894 (Second-Service clasp)

Richard Roberts, Coxswain Superintendent – 1907 (Third-Service clasp)

William Adams, Coxswain – 1916

William Adams, Coxswain – 1917 (Second-Service clasp)

William Stanton, Coxswain (North Deal Reserve lifeboat) – 1917
Robert Holbourn, Second Coxswain (North Deal Reserve lifeboat) – 1917

William Adams, Coxswain – 1919 (Third-Service clasp)

- RNLI Bronze Medal

William Stanton, Coxswain (North Deal Reserve lifeboat) – 1919

== North Deal lifeboats ==
=== No.1 Station ===
ON (Note: ON is the RNLI's Official Number of the boat.)	Name	Built	On station	Class	Comments
Pre-449	Van Kook	1865	1865−1881	40-foot Self-righting (P&S)	(Note: 40-foot x 10-foot 1in (12-oared) self-righting (P&S) lifeboat, gift of Mr E. W. Cooke, RA, and friends, of Hyde Park, London, built by Forrestt of Limehouse, London, costing £350.); Renamed Mary Somerville in 1881.
Pre-449	Mary Sommerville	1865	1881–1887	40-foot Self-righting (P&S)	(Note: Legacy of Miss Martha C. Sommerville of Genoa.)
178	Mary Sommerville	1886	1887−1888	40-foot Self-righting (P&S)	(Note: 40-foot x 10-foot (12-oared) self-righting (P&S) lifeboat, legacy of Miss Martha C. Sommerville of Genoa, built by Forrestt of Limehouse, London, costing £700.)
227	Mary Sommerville	1888	1888−1905	42-foot Self-righting (P&S)	(Note: 42-foot x 11-foot (12-oared) self-righting (P&S) lifeboat, legacy of Miss Martha C. Sommerville of Genoa, built by Woolfe of Shadwell, London, costing £510.)
552	Charles Dibdin (Civil Service No.2)	1905	1905−1932	43-foot Self-righting (P&S)	(Note: 43-foot x 12-foot (10-oared) self-righting (P&S) lifeboat, gift of the Civil Service LB fund, built by Thames Ironworks of Blackwall, London, costing £1,713.)

Pre ON numbers are unofficial numbers used by the Lifeboat Enthusiast Society to reference early lifeboats not included on the official RNLI list.

=== No.2 Station ===
ON	Name	Built	On station	Class	Comments
399	Frances Forbes Barton	1896	1915−1921	40-foot Self-righting (P&S)	(Note: 40-foot x 10-foot 4in (12-oared) self-righting (P&S) lifeboat, legacy of Miss I Webster of Exeter, built by Rutherford of Birkenhead, costing £697 when new.); Previously at Walmer

== See also ==
- List of RNLI stations
- List of former RNLI stations
- Royal National Lifeboat Institution lifeboats
