= RNLB Lord Southborough =

Boat

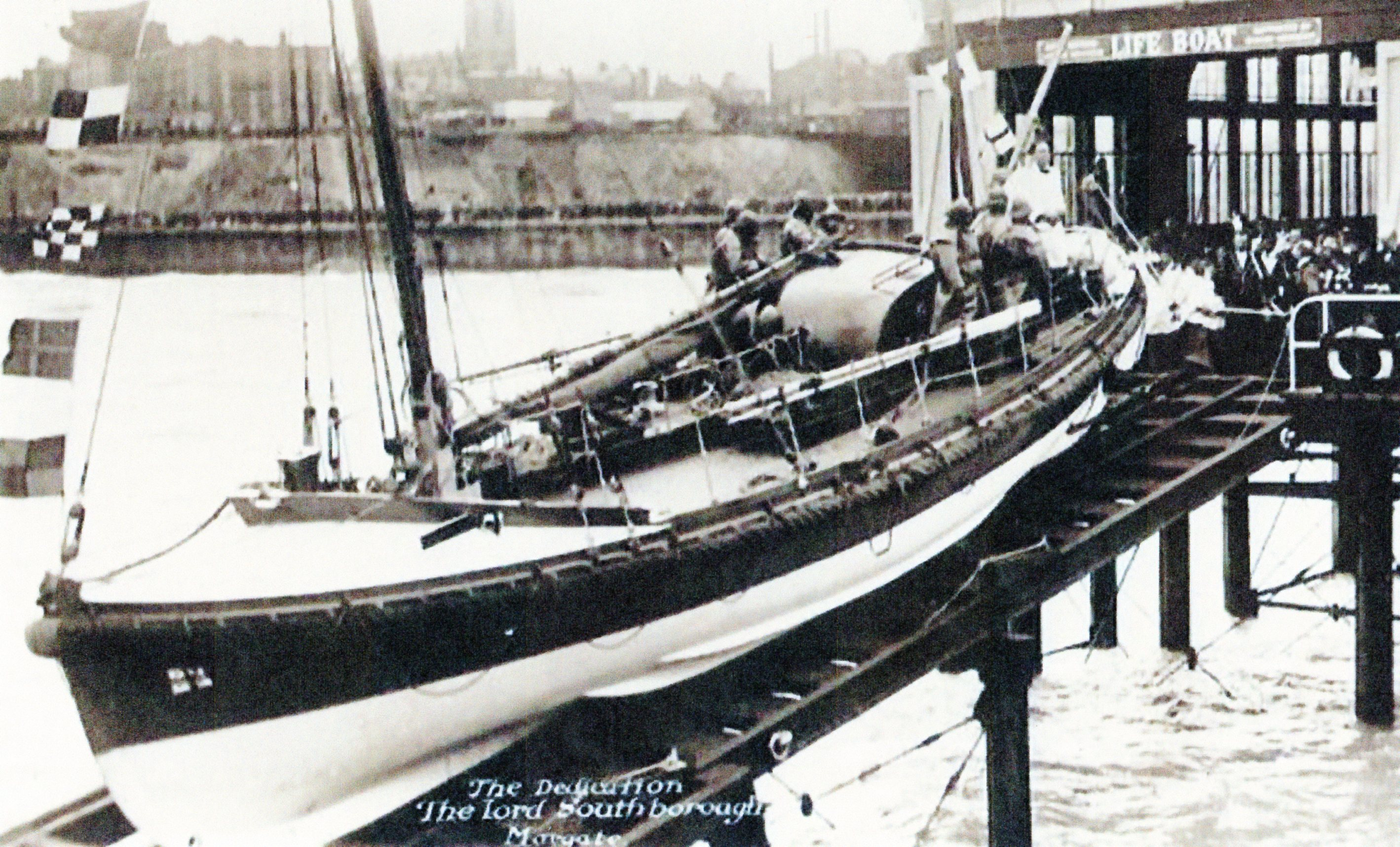
- Lord Southborough (ON 832)

History

British RNLI Flag
- Namesake: Francis Hopwood, 1st Baron Southborough
- Owner: Royal National Lifeboat Institution (RNLI)
- Builder: S.E. Saunders, Cowes, Isle of Wight
- Official Number: ON 688
- Station: Margate Lifeboat Station, Relief Fleet 1951 - 1955
- Cost: £8,997
- Laid down: 1924
- Sponsored by: Civil Service, Post Office and British Telecom Lifeboat Fund
- Acquired: 1925
- Fate: Unknown

General characteristics
- Class & type: Watson (Motor) Class
- Length: 45 ft 0 in (13.72 m) overall
- Beam: 12 ft 6 in (3.81 m)
- Installed power: One 80hp Weyburn DE6 petrol engine

Royal National Life Boat Lord Southborough (Civil Service No. 1) (ON 688), was a 45-foot Watson-class motor lifeboat of the Royal National Lifeboat Institution's (RNLI) fleet, which was stationed at Margate in the English county of Kent in the United Kingdom from 1925 to 1951. From 1951 she served in the RNLI Relief Fleet.

== Description and origin ==
Lord Southborough was built in 1924 in the boatyards of Saunders-Roe, in Cowes on the Isle of Wight. She was a Watson-class motor lifeboat and was 45 ft 0 in (13.72 m) in length, with a beam of 12 ft 6 in (3.81 m), powered by a single 80 horsepower Weyburn DE6 6-cylinder petrol engine.

The Lord Southborough was financed by the organization and charity known as the 'Civil Service, Post Office and British Telecom Lifeboat Fund' or 'CISPOTEL', which has funded 56 lifeboats. It was to be named after the Chairman and Honorary Treasurer Francis Hopwood, Lord Southborough, who was Honorary Treasurer of CISPOTEL for 33 years.

However, before the lifeboat was dispatched to Margate, it became the primary RNLI exhibit at the British Empire Exhibition, housed in the 'Lifeboat House' at Wembley between 23 April and 1 November 1924. Specifically for the exhibition, the boat was named Grace Darling. It is estimated that over three-quarters of a million people looked over the boat whilst on display. When the exhibition reopened after a winter break on 9 May 1925, she had been replaced by a different 45-foot Watson-class, M. O. Y. E. (ON 695), which again for the exhibition, bore the name Grace Darling. M. O. Y. E. would be deployed to Porthdinllaen after the exhibition closed permanently on 31 October 1925.

== Service history ==
Early on the morning of 29 December 1929, Lord Southborough attempted to assist the vessel Hermine of Germany, which had run aground in a storm. Lord Southborough's crew were unable to re-float the Hermine, so the German crew were evacuated to shore. The government of Germany awarded certificates of thanks to Lord Southborough's crew for their efforts.

=== Dunkirk evacuation ===
Lord Southbourough Lifeboat Crew at Dunkirk
RNLB Lord Southbourgh (ON 832)
Name	Rank
Edward (Ted) Parker DSM	Coxswain
T. Harman	Second Coxswain
E. Jorden	Engineer
W Mackie	Second Engineer
H. Parker	Bowman
D. Price	Signaller
J Letley	Crewman
A. Morris	Crewman
A. Ladd	Crewman
T. Parker	Extra Crewman
W. Hopper	Extra Crewman

On 30 May 1940, the Lord Southborough was launched to assist in the evacuation of the British Expeditionary Force at Dunkirk in France.

The crew of the Lord Southborough was one of only three RNLI lifeboat crews used in the evacuation that were allowed to take their own lifeboat across the English Channel, the others being crewed by Royal Navy personnel.

Lord Southborough was the second of these lifeboats to arrive at the Dunkirk beaches, behind the Ramsgate lifeboat Prudential (ON 697). The two lifeboats ferried soldiers from the beach to larger ships waiting off-shore in deeper water to evacuate them back to England.

Lord Southborough is officially credited with having evacuated 600 military personnel from Dunkirk's beach. 500 of these were ferried from the beach at La Panne to the Royal Navy destroyer HMS Icarus.

On behalf of every officer and man on this ship, I should like to express to you our unbound admiration for the magnificent behaviour of the crew of the lifeboat Lord Southborough…. The manner in which, with no thought of rest, they brought off load after load of soldiers under continuous shelling, bombing and aerial machine-gun fire will be an inspiration to us all as long as we live. We are proud to be the fellow countrymen of such men.

— Lt. Commander E. G. Roper, Commanding officer, Royal Navy destroyer HMS Icarus

The lifeboat's Coxswain Edward Parker was one of the two lifeboat coxswains in the operation awarded the Distinguished Service Medal.

=== The Battle of Britain ===
From August 1940 the Battle of Britain raged in the skies above the south coast of England, and the RNLI lifeboats were used to rescue airmen that had come down in the English Channel and the North Sea. One of the busiest lifeboat crews during the battle was that of Lord Southborough. On 3 September 1940 Lord Southborough was sent out to search for a missing Spitfire pilot who had been shot down in an air-to-air engagement with a Luftwaffe Messerschmitt 109. The fighter-pilot was Richard Hillary (a descendant of Sir William Hillary, the founder of the RNLI in 1824) who had sustained extensive burns to his face and hands. He was rescued and taken ashore in considerable pain. The lifeboat crew later visited him in hospital during his recovery.

=== HMS Guardsman ===
On the afternoon of 15 November 1940, the Lord Southborough launched to assist the Royal Navy Tug HMS Guardsman after she struck a mine off North Foreland headland and exploded. The Guardsman had sunk by the time Lord Southborough arrived, but the lifeboat was able to rescue seven of the nine Royal Navy personnel from the wreckage.

=== April 1941 ===
At 5:45pm in the early evening of 10 April 1941 Lord Southborough was launched to search for a crashed Royal Air Force Blenheim bomber, which had been reported as having made a forced landing on Margate Sands 3 miles off shore after returning from an attack on Borkum, during which it had been damaged by anti-aircraft defensive fire. Lord Southborough located and rescued the three man R.A.F. aircrew using a small dinghy as the lifeboat could only get to within a quarter of a mile of the aircraft's crash site.

== Service career ==
Lord Southborough was in service for the RNLI for a total of 30 years. 25 of those years were spent at Margate where she performed 278 service launches. She was credited with saving 269 lives. For the last 5 years of her RNLI career she was placed in its Relief Fleet, with which she went on to perform another 14 service launches, and she saved a further 17 lives.

=== Retirement and disposal ===
Lord Southborough was sold out of the service by the RNLI in 1955. She was bought by the Crown Agents for further use as a lifeboat in the British Overseas Territories and is thought to have been sent to Benghazi, Libya. She was last reported at Sholing near Southampton in November 2001.
