= Rother-class lifeboat =

Former RNLI lifeboat class

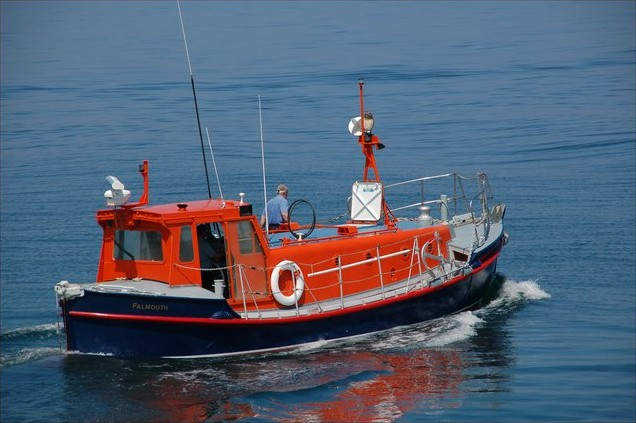
- Privately owned Rother-class lifeboat Harold Salvesen (ON 1022) departing Donaghadee.

Class overview
- Builders: William Osbourne, Littlehampton; Groves & Gutteridge, Cowes
- Operators: Royal National Lifeboat Institution; Greymouth Coastguard Rescue, NZ; ADES Uruguay
- Preceded by: Oakley
- Succeeded by: Mersey
- Built: 1972–1982
- In service: 1973–2011
- Completed: 14
- Retired: 14

General characteristics
- Displacement: 13 tons
- Length: 37 ft 6 in (11.43 m)
- Beam: 11 ft 6 in (3.51 m)
- Draught: 3 ft 6 in (1.07 m)
- Propulsion: 2 x 52-hp Ford Thornycroft 250 diesel; 2 x 52-hp Mermaid '397' diesel; 2 x 52-hp Mermaid 'Melody' diesel
- Speed: 8 knots (9.2 mph)
- Range: 180 nautical miles (330 km)
- Complement: 7

The Rother-class lifeboat was a self-righting lifeboat, operated by the Royal National Lifeboat Institution around the coast of the United Kingdom and Ireland between 1972 and 1995. They were based on the 37 ft (11 m) Oakley-class lifeboat.

== History ==
The Rother-class was a development of the 37 ft (11 m) Oakley lifeboat, and like its predecessor, was primarily intended for carriage launching, although six of the 14 were assigned to slipway stations.

== Design ==
A major change was the abandonment of the Oakley's complicated water ballast self-righting system. The Rother achieved its self-righting ability from its extended watertight superstructure, and all had an enclosed wheelhouse, with the radar mounted on the roof.

Twin 52-hp diesel engines gave a maximum speed of 8 knots (9.2 mph; 15 km/h), and at this speed, the range was around 180 nautical miles (210 mi; 330 km).

The boats built for Walmer and Aldeburgh had strengthened hulls for beach launching over skids.

== Retirement ==
The Rother-class was the final displacement hull lifeboat produced by the RNLI. Even before production began, the RNLI had already started operating much faster lifeboats, like the Waveney-class, twice as fast at 15 knots. The 18.5 knot Arun-class also commenced service in 1972. By 1983, a target date of 1993 had been set, for all 201 offshore stations to operate faster lifeboats, capable of at least 15 knots, with the majority at 17–18 knots. As a result, all the Rother-class lifeboats had a shorter than usual career, and none of the 14 built reached 20 years service life with the RNLI.

The RNLB James Cable (ON 1068), built in 1982, was the last displacement hull lifeboat in RNLI service, operating for just 11 years, before being withdrawn from Aldeburgh in December 1993.

Two boats, Alice Upjohn (ON 1048) and James Cable (ON 1068) were sold to overseas rescue services in New Zealand and Uruguay, the latter operating until 2011 before being retired.

== Fleet ==
Note: Op No.s 37-01 to 37-26 were allocated to Oakley-class lifeboats, the Rother-class continuing the series from 37-27.

ON (Note: ON is the RNLI's Official Number of the boat.)	Op. No. (Note: Op. No. is the RNLI's Operational Number of the boat carried on the hull.)	Name	Built	In service	Station	Launching method	Comments
998	37-27	Osman Gabriel	1972	1973–1992	Port Erin	Slipway	(Note: Gift of Maj. O. Gabriel, built by William Osborne of Littlehampton, with twin 52-hp Thornycroft '250' diesel engines, costing £60,000.) Sold March 1993. Renamed Anita, last reported ashore at Dirhami, Estonia, July 2023.
998	37-27	Osman Gabriel	1972	1992–1993	Relief fleet		Sold March 1993. Renamed Anita, last reported ashore at Dirhami, Estonia, July 2023.
999	37-28	Diana White	1973	1973–1991	Sennen Cove	Slipway	(Note: Anonymous gift, plus contribution from the Cornish Lifeboat Appeal, with twin 52-hp Thornycroft '250' diesel engines, costing £89,000.) Sold 1992. Renamed Joseph Day, but by February 2017 it was awaiting restoration as Diana White on a farm at Mangatangi, New Zealand. Last reported stripped down and for sale, Katikati, New Zealand, January 2023.
1000	37-29	Mary Gabriel	1973	1974–1990	Hoylake	Carriage	(Note: Gift of Maj. O. Gabriel, built by William Osborne of Littlehampton, with twin 52-hp Thornycroft '250' diesel engines, costing £90,000.) Sold October 1992. Previously on display at Chatham Historic Dockyard, later a trip boat at Tenby (2020) and Scarborough (2022). Stored for restoration at Lea Valley Marina, October 2025.
1000	37-29	Mary Gabriel	1973	1990–1992	Rhyl	Carriage	Sold October 1992. Previously on display at Chatham Historic Dockyard, later a trip boat at Tenby (2020) and Scarborough (2022). Stored for restoration at Lea Valley Marina, October 2025.
1022	37-30	Harold Salvesen	1973	1974–1986	Amble	Afloat	(Note: Gift of The Salvesen Trust, built by Groves and Guttridge of Cowes, with twin 52-hp Thornycroft '250' diesel engines, costing £95,000.) Sold October 1992. Private ownership at Milford Haven, January 2025.
1022	37-30	Harold Salvesen	1973	1986–1992	Relief fleet		Sold October 1992. Private ownership at Milford Haven, January 2025.
1022	37-30	Harold Salvesen	1973	1992	Rhyl	Carriage	Sold October 1992. Private ownership at Milford Haven, January 2025.
1023	37-31	J. Reginald Corah	1974	1975–1992	Swanage	Slipway	(Note: Gift of the J. Reginald Corah Foundation, built by Groves and Guttridge of Cowes, with twin 52-hp Thornycroft '250' diesel engines, costing £95,000.) Sold June 1995. By June 2022, had been renamed Louise 2-G-B-H. At Guldborg, Denmark, October 2025.
1024	37-32	The Hampshire Rose	1974	1975–1990	Walmer	Beach	(Note: Gift of The Hampshire Rose appeal, built by William Osborne of Littlehampton, with twin 52-hp Thornycroft '250' diesel engines, costing £95,000.) Sold October 1992. Trip boat at Ilfracombe, Devon, March 2025.
1024	37-32	The Hampshire Rose	1974	1990–1991	Relief fleet		Sold October 1992. Trip boat at Ilfracombe, Devon, March 2025.
1024	37-32	The Hampshire Rose	1974	1991	Anstruther	Afloat	Sold October 1992. Trip boat at Ilfracombe, Devon, March 2025.
1024	37-32	The Hampshire Rose	1974	1991–1992	Relief fleet		Sold October 1992. Trip boat at Ilfracombe, Devon, March 2025.
1046	37-33	Silver Jubilee (Civil Service No. 38)	1977	1978–1991	Margate	Carriage	(Note: Gift of the Civil Service LB fund, built by William Osborne of Littlehampton, with twin 52-hp Mermaid '397' diesel engines, costing £105,000.) Sold March 1994. Unaltered working pleasure boat at Yonkers Yacht Club, River Hudson, December 2025.
1046	37-33	Silver Jubilee (Civil Service No. 38)	1977	1991–1993	Relief fleet		Sold March 1994. Unaltered working pleasure boat at Yonkers Yacht Club, River Hudson, December 2025.
1047	37-34	Horace Clarkson	1977	1977–1987	Moelfre	Slipway	(Note: Gift of H. Clarkson and Co. Ltd., built by William Osborne of Littlehampton, with twin 52-hp Mermaid '397' diesel engines, costing £107,000.) Sold May 1993. Unaltered working pleasure boat at Wells-next-the-Sea, Norfolk, December 2025.
1047	37-34	Horace Clarkson	1977	1987–1993	Relief fleet		Sold May 1993. Unaltered working pleasure boat at Wells-next-the-Sea, Norfolk, December 2025.
1048	37-35	Alice Upjohn	1976	1977–1992	Dungeness	Carriage	(Note: Gift of Miss Upjohn, built by William Osborne of Littlehampton, with twin 52-hp Mermaid '397' diesel engines, costing £130,000.) Sold 1995, named Ivan Talley Rescue at Greymouth, New Zealand. See below.
1048	37-35	Alice Upjohn	1976	1992–1995	Relief fleet		Sold 1995, named Ivan Talley Rescue at Greymouth, New Zealand. See below.
1054	37-36	Shoreline	1979	1979–1982	Blyth	Slipway	(Note: Gift of The Shoreline Appeal, built by William Osborne of Littlehampton, with twin 52-hp Mermaid '397' diesel engines, costing £210,000.) Sold February 1994. Renamed Porta Maggie, later Mairi Bhan. Private ownership at Banavie, Scotland, October 2025.
1054	37-36	Shoreline	1979	1982–1993	Arbroath	Slipway	Sold February 1994. Renamed Porta Maggie, later Mairi Bhan. Private ownership at Banavie, Scotland, October 2025.
1055	37-37	Duke of Kent	1982	1979–1993	Eastbourne	Slipway	(Note: Gift of The Eastbourne Lifeboat Appeal, built by William Osborne of Littlehampton, with twin 52-hp Mermaid '397' diesel engines, costing £210,000.) Sold June 1995. Initially used as a survey boat at Tayport Harbour, pleasure boat by 2012. Returned to Eastbourne in 2017 for restoration, standing near the Inshore Lifeboat Station, December 2025.
1063	37-38	Princess of Wales	1982	1982–1992	Barmouth	Carriage	(Note: Gift of The Welsh Lifeboat Appeal, built by William Osborne of Littlehampton, with twin 52-hp Mermaid 'Melody' diesel engines, costing £239,197.) Sold May 1993. Renamed Glow-worm. Unaltered condition, stored at Portraine, Dublin, December 2025.
1063	37-38	Princess of Wales	1982	1992–1993	Relief fleet		Sold May 1993. Renamed Glow-worm. Unaltered condition, stored at Portraine, Dublin, December 2025.
1064	37-39	The Davys Family	1981	1981–1986	Shoreham Harbour	Slipway	(Note: Gift of Mrs Mason, built by William Osborne of Littlehampton, with twin 52-hp Mermaid 'Melody' diesel engines, costing £240,000.) Sold July 1995. Renamed The Mary Heather, ashore as a holiday let on the Cuan Sound, Seil, Scotland, December 2025.
1064	37-39	The Davys Family	1981	1986–1993	Relief fleet		Sold July 1995. Renamed The Mary Heather, ashore as a holiday let on the Cuan Sound, Seil, Scotland, December 2025.
1068	37-40	James Cable	1982	1982–1993	Aldeburgh	Beach	(Note: Gift of The Aldeburgh Lifeboat Appeal, built by William Osborne of Littlehampton, with twin 52-hp Mermaid 'Melody' diesel engines, costing £246,000.) Sold August 1994. Renamed ADES 13 Agustin Carlevaro with ADES Uruguay. See below.

== Other fleets ==
RNLI ON (Note: ON is the RNLI's Official Number of the boat.)	Name	Built	In service	Station	Comments
1048	Ivan Talley Rescue; (Greymouth Coastguard Rescue)	1977	1995–2007	Greymouth; New Zealand	Sold 2008. Private ownership as Alice Upjohn, Lake Wakatipu, Queenstown, New Zealand, January 2024.
1068	ADES 13 Agustin Carlevaro; (ADES Uruguay)	1982	1995–2011	Montevideo, Uruguay	Sold 2011. Renamed Nauti II. Workboat at Montevideo, May 2022.

== See also ==
- Royal National Lifeboat Institution lifeboats
