= SS Cap Lopez =

Coordinates: 51.2°N 1.5°E

History
- Name: Rheinland (1885-1905); Cap Lopez (1905-1907)
- Owner: Rabien & Statlander (1885-1905); Société Anonyme du SS Cap Lopez, Antwerp (1905-1907); Société Anonyme de Navigation Mercure, Antwerp (1907)
- Operator: Rabien & Statlander (1885-1905); F Siebert (1905-07)
- Port of registry: (German Empire) Brake (1885-1905); (Belgium) Antwerp (1905-07)
- Builder: H Hespe, Brake
- Completed: 1885
- Fate: Wrecked on the Goodwin Sands, 20 December 1907

General characteristics
- Tonnage: 758 GRT; 546 NRT
- Propulsion: 1 x compound steam engine, 75 hp (56 kW)

The SS Cap Lopez was a 758 GRT cargo ship that was built in 1885 as Rheinland. She was sold in 1905 and renamed, and became stranded on the south Goodwin Sands on 21 December 1907.

== History ==
Cap Lopez was built in 1885 by H Hespe of Brake, Lower Saxony. She was originally named Rheinland. She was built for Rabien and Stadtlander, Brake. In 1905 she was sold to Société Anonyme du SS Cap Lopez and was renamed Cap Lopez (after the African cape). She was managed by F Siebert. In 1907, Cap Lopez was sold to Société Anonyme de Navigation Mercure, Antwerp. She was wrecked on the South Goodwin Sands on 20 December 1907. At the time of her wreck she was carrying a cargo of iron ore and salt from Mazarrón, Spain to Antwerp.

== Shipwreck ==
Regardless of the efforts made to save the ship, it ultimately became a total loss. G.B. Bayley, a Deal boatman, said that the wind was blowing hard W.S.W., and the sea was correspondingly heavy. The Charles Hargrave of Kingsdown was launched at 2.30 AM in response to distress signals being fired.

"Finding the vessel fast aground she anchored to windward and veered down alongside, when the Captain asked the Coxswain to do his best to salve her." Against the prevailing weather an attempt was just possible, and the Walmer lifeboat arrived shortly afterwards to assist in the attempt. As was usual in such difficult conditions, a complement of men from each of the lifeboats boarded the wreck, an anchor being laid out in a suitable place. Only then could the task of throwing over the side an amount of the cargo begin, but the worsening weather made this attempt to lighten the ship futile. With the tide making, and the wind increasing to a fierce gale, the sea became so heavy that it became clear the ship would have to be abandoned.

Shortly afterwards, "a great towering sea struck the Walmer lifeboat, broke the rope connecting her with the vessel, smashed her rudder and other parts of her steering gear, and carried her far away to leeward in a helpless condition with about half her crew aboard the stranded ship, over which the seas were by now making a clean breach." (Treanor)

With the Walmer lifeboat disabled, the task fell to the men of Kingsdown to take off the ship's crew and the Walmer boatmen. In the attempt to veer close enough to accomplish this, the lifeboat was raised clear above the wreck, and in descending she was struck heavily by a part of the upper structure of the ship, narrowly escaping total destruction. The next heavy sea cleared the Kingsdown lifeboat, which, having been damaged, returned to the attempt. ‘The men who were there (said) the escape was miraculous’. So fierce had conditions become that many of those stranded upon the ‘Cap Lopez’ had no other recourse other than to take to the rigging, and from there to jump for the lifeboat whenever the opportunity presented itself. By this means, and at great length, all aboard were rescued, including the ships dog.

The perils of the sea still hard against them, the coxswain and his crew got the lifeboat clear to go to the assistance of the Walmer boat, which was taken in tow. So far leeward had they been blown that the safest option was to make for Ramsgate, which was reached at about noon on the 22nd, where the crew of the ‘Cap Lopez’ and the two lifeboat crews, all thoroughly exhausted, were well cared for at the Sailors Home, with the lifeboats being towed back to their stations by the Harbour tug on the following day.

The men who formed the Kingsdown crew on this occasion were:~ James Pay, (Acting Coxswain), William Sutton, J.Birch, John Bingham, Edward Arnold, A.Sutton, J.Kingsford, T.Bingham, John Arnold, Charles Arnold, James.Laming, James Bingham, and Edward Bingham.

The Walmer crew were:~ T.Heard, H.Parker, R.Mercer, J.Mercer, W.Pearson, H.Pearson, B.Pearson, T.Lewis, G.Norris, W.Baily, J.Bullen, T.Bullen, E.Jordan, B.Jordan, and T.Gardener.
