= Porthdinllaen Lifeboat Station =

RNLI lifeboat station in Gwynedd, Wales

- Gorsaf Bad Achub Porthdinllaen

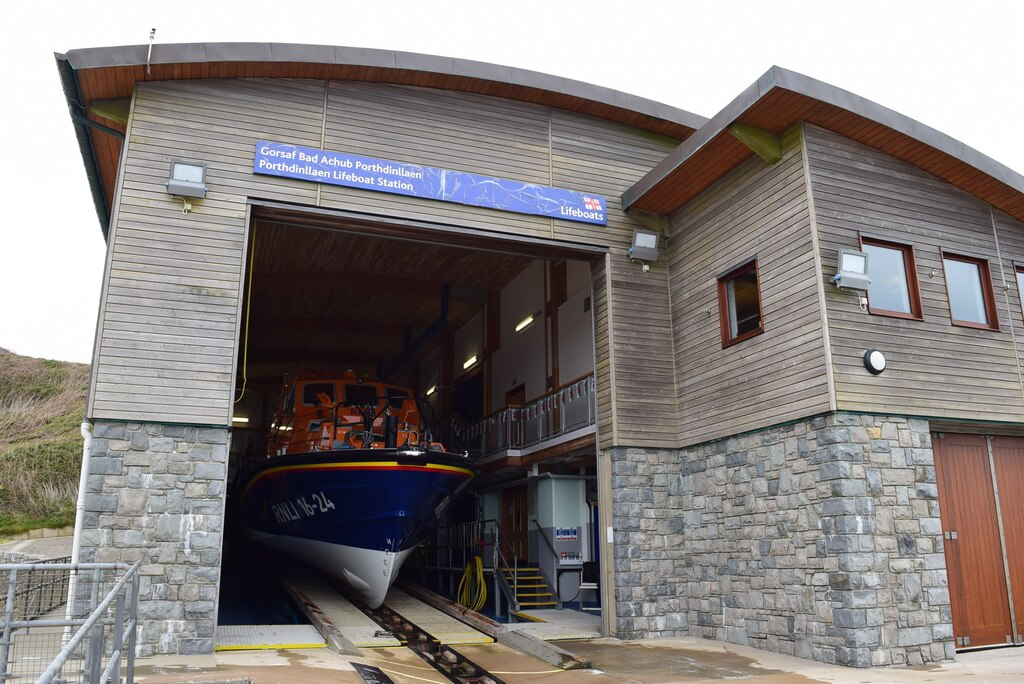
- Porthdinllaen Lifeboat Station in 2024

- Location within Gwynedd

General information
- Type: RNLI Lifeboat Station
- Location: Lon Golff, Porthdinllaen, Morfa Nefyn, Gwynedd, LL53 6DA, Wales
- Coordinates: 52.946964°N 4.564600°W
- Opened: 1864
- Owner: Royal National Lifeboat Institution

Website
- Porthdinllaen RNLI Lifeboat Station

Porthdinllaen Lifeboat Station (Welsh Gorsaf Bad Achub Porthdinllaen) sits on the spit of land north of the village of Morfa Nefyn, approximately 20 miles (32 km) south-west of Caernarfon, on the north-west coast of the Llŷn Peninsula, within the community of Dwyfor in the county of Gwynedd, North Wales.

A lifeboat station was established at Portdinllaen by the Royal National Lifeboat Institution (RNLI) in 1864.

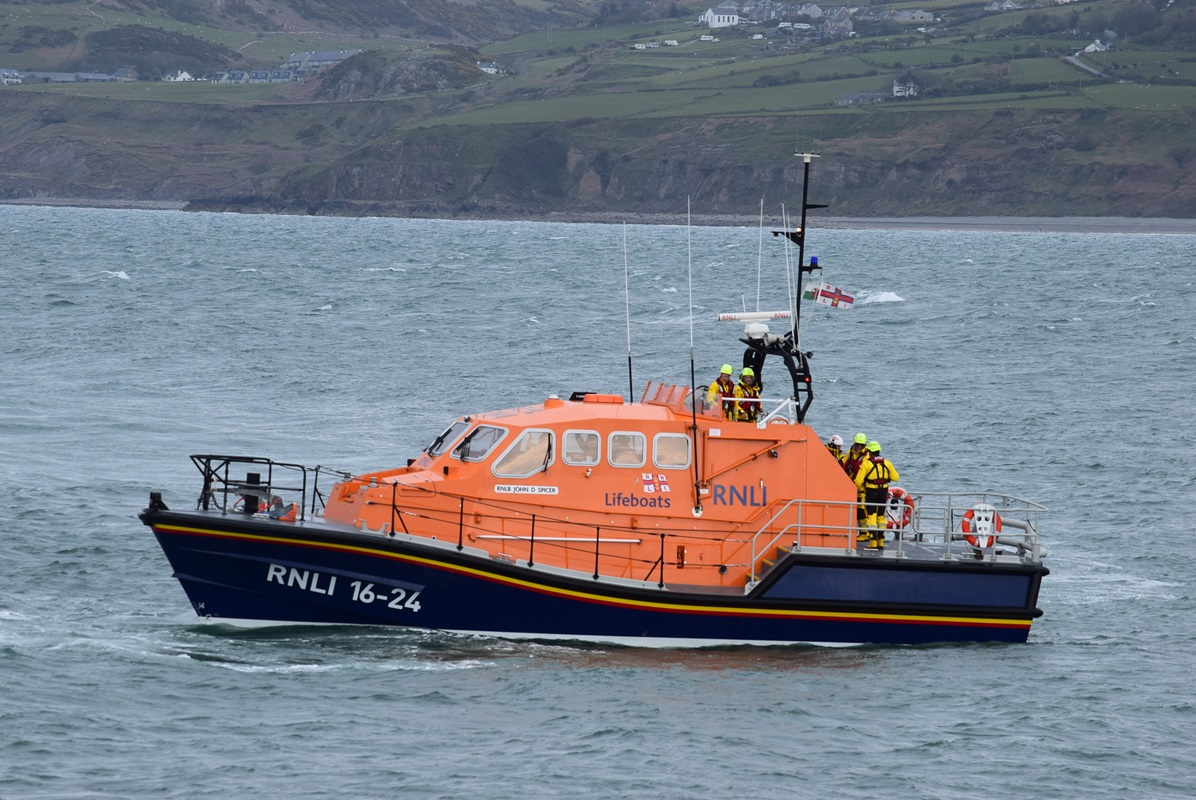
Porthdinllaen RNLI Tamar-class lifeboat 16-24 John D. Spicer (ON 1304)

Porthdinllaen Lifeboat Station currently operates a Tamar-class All-weather lifeboat, 16-24 John D. Spicer (ON 1304), on station since 2012.

== History ==
In the 19th century, North Wales lacked good roads, and so the sea was the easiest way to access many places. Porthdinllaen, on the northern coast of the Llŷn peninsula, with its sheltered north facing bay, became important as a harbour of refuge and a busy port, with over 700 ships passing through the port in 1861.

On the night of 2–3 December 1863, 18 ships that had been sheltering in Porthdinllaen bay were driven ashore and wrecked. Robert Rees of Morfa Nefyn tied a rope around his waist and, with the help of 4 other men, succeeded in saving 28 lives. For his gallantry on that occasion, Rees was awarded the Bronze Medal from the Board of Trade and 'The Thanks of the Institution inscribed on Vellum' by the RNLI.

After storms subdued, the Reverend Owen Lloyd Williams, Vicar of Boduan, wrote to the RNLI in London to ask for a lifeboat station to be established at Porthdinllaen. After an inspection of the area in February 1864 by Captain J.R. Ward, and his fully supporting recommendation report, the establishment of a lifeboat station was approved by the RNLI on 3 March 1864.

The proposal was to establish both a stone boat house and stone slipway, and to protect the structure to allow safe launching of the lifeboat from the prevailing westerly winds through creation of a protective seawall. After accepting an estimate of £140 for the works, local contractors were engaged. Instead of building a new lifeboat, the RNLI proposed to move and reallocate the existing lifeboat at Sea Palling in Norfolk, England. Built by Forrestt of Limehouse in 1858 as a 30-foot × 7-foot 6in, self-righting 'Pulling and Sailing' (P&S) lifeboat, one with (10) oars and sails, the boat was returned to the Forrestt boatyard in 1864, and altered to be a 36-foot × 8-foot, 12-oared lifeboat, at a cost of £198.

Conveyed from London to Caernarfon free of charge by the London & North Western Railway, she was then sailed south to Porthdinllaen, arriving on 26 August 1864. The boat was funded by a donation of £250 by Lady Cotton-Sheppard (née Elizabeth Cotton of Thornton Hall, Oxfordshire), the third that she had underwritten. The boat was duly named Cotton Sheppard in a ceremony on 9 September 1864, conducted by new vicar, the Rev. John Hughes, who also became the station's Honorary Secretary. His brother Hugh Hughes, was appointed as the first coxswain.

== Operations ==
Staffed constantly since its opening, Porthdinllaen Lifeboat Station is the only lifeboat station where Welsh is the normally spoken language of the crew.

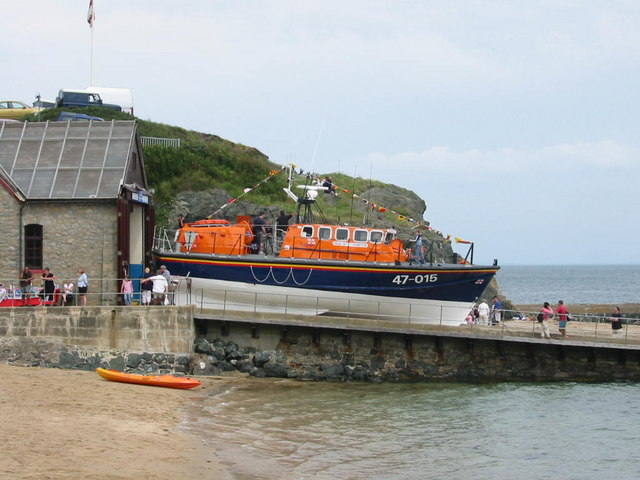
Tyne-class lifeboat Hetty Rampton on the slipway at the former Porthdinllaen Lifeboat Station

The Tyne-class lifeboat Hetty Rampton (ON 1120), in service since 27 April 1987, was replaced in 2012 by a new Tamar-class lifeboat, John D Spicer (ON 1304). Funded by a bequest within the will and by agreement with the executors of the estate of John Dominic Spicer of Oxfordshire, who died in October 2010, the new boat was temporarily kept on a mooring while work to build a new boathouse was undertaken.

Due to the size and scale of the new boat, a new lifeboat house and slipway was constructed with much improved crew and workshop facilities, at a cost of £8 million. This became operational in April 2014. Originally due to start construction in Spring 2011, due to access concerns of the local population and the costs of realignment of a track along the cliff top via the Nefyn and District Golf Club, the RNLI determined that the new boathouse would be constructed with materials delivered by sea. This was the method used in 2006–2008 for construction of the new £5.5million boathouse for the Tenby Lifeboat Station.

Among the awards received by the crew over the years are one silver and three bronze RNLI medals for gallantry, the last awarded in 1981.

In 2013, S4C broadcast a 6-part series (called Bad Achub Porthdinllaen), showing a year in the life of the Porthdinllaen lifeboat.

== Visitor access ==
This station is classed as an Explore lifeboat station by the RNLI, for those lifeboat stations which aim to offer the best visitor experience. It is accessible to the public, including to see the lifeboat and visit the RNLI gift shop. When not on call, the station offers free access in the summer months, and pre-booked tours in the winter.

== Station honours ==
The following are awards made at Porthdinllaen:

- Bronze Medal from the Board of Trade
  Robert Rees – 1863
- RNLI Silver Medal
  William Dop, Second Coxswain – 1951
- RNLI Bronze Medal
  Griffith John Jones, Coxswain – 1975
  Glyn Roberts, crew member – 1977
  Michael Massarelli, Acting Coxswain – 1981
- 'The Thanks of the Institution inscribed on Vellum'
  Robert Rees – 1863
  John Scott, Second Coxswain – 1977
- Merchant Navy Medal for Meritorious Service
  Mike Davies, former Coxswain – 2019
- British Empire Medal
  Kenneth Fitzpatrick, Lifeboat Operations Manager – 2024NYH

== Porthdinllaen lifeboats ==
=== Pulling and Sailing (P&S) lifeboats ===
ON (Note: ON is the RNLI's Official Number of the boat.)	Name	Built	On station	Class	Launches/ Lives saved	Comments
Pre-322	Cotton Sheppard	1858	1864–1877	36-foot Peake self-righting (P&S)	26 / 43	(Note: Modified 36 ft 0 in (10.97 m) x 8 ft 0 in (2.44 m) (12-oared) Peake-class self-righting (P&S) lifeboat, gift of Lady Sheppard of Uttoxeter, built and later modified by Forrestt of Limehouse, London, costing £250 when modified.); Previously at Palling. Broken up in 1877.
Pre-624	George Moore	1877	1877–1887	37-foot self-righting (P&S)	39 / 70	(Note: 37 ft 0 in (11.28 m) x 9 ft 0 in (2.74 m) (12-oared) self-righting (P&S) lifeboat, funded by the employees of Copestake, Hughes, Crampton & Co., built by Woolfe of Shadwell, London, costing £430.); Damaged and condemned in 1887.
219	George Moore	1888	1888–1902	39-foot self-righting (P&S)	11 / 22	(Note: 39 ft 0 in (11.89 m) x 9 ft 0 in (2.74 m) (12-oared) self-righting (P&S) lifeboat, funded by the employees of Copestake, Hughes, Crampton & Co., built by Hansen of Cowes, costing £410.); Sold in 1902.
480	Barbara Fleming	1902	1902–1926	40-foot self-righting (P&S)	32 / 52	(Note: 40 ft 0 in (12.19 m) x 10 ft 6 in (3.20 m) (12-oared) self-righting (P&S) lifeboat, legacy of Miss J. I. Fleming of Windermere, built by Thames Ironworks of Blackwall, London, costing £1,278.); Transferred to Kingsdown.

Pre ON numbers are unofficial numbers used by the Lifeboat Enthusiasts' Society to reference early lifeboats not included on the official RNLI list.

=== Motor lifeboats ===
ON	Op.No. (Note: Op. No. is the RNLI's Operational Number of the boat carried on the hull.)	Name	Built	On station	Class	Launches/ Lives saved	Comments
695	–	M. O. Y. E.	1925	1926–1949	45-foot Watson	56 / 16 (3) / (0)	Named Grace Darling whilst on display at the British Empire Exhibition in 1925 prior to her arrival on station.
866	–	Charles Henry Ashley	1949	1949–1979	46-foot 9in Watson	151 / 89 (17) / (6)	Transferred to the relief fleet, later at Penlee.
950	–	Kathleen Mary	1959	1979–1987	47-foot Watson	53 / >28 (9) / (1)	Previously at Newhaven. Transferred to Appledore.
1120	47-015	Hetty Rampton	1987	1987–2012	Tyne	90 / 35 (15) / (2)	
1304	16-24	John D. Spicer	2012	2012–	Tamar		

More post-service details can be found on the respective lifeboat class pages.
Launches by relief lifeboats on station, in brackets

== See also ==
- List of RNLI stations
- List of former RNLI stations
- Royal National Lifeboat Institution lifeboats
