= Burnham-on-Crouch Lifeboat Station =

RNLI Lifeboat station in Essex, England

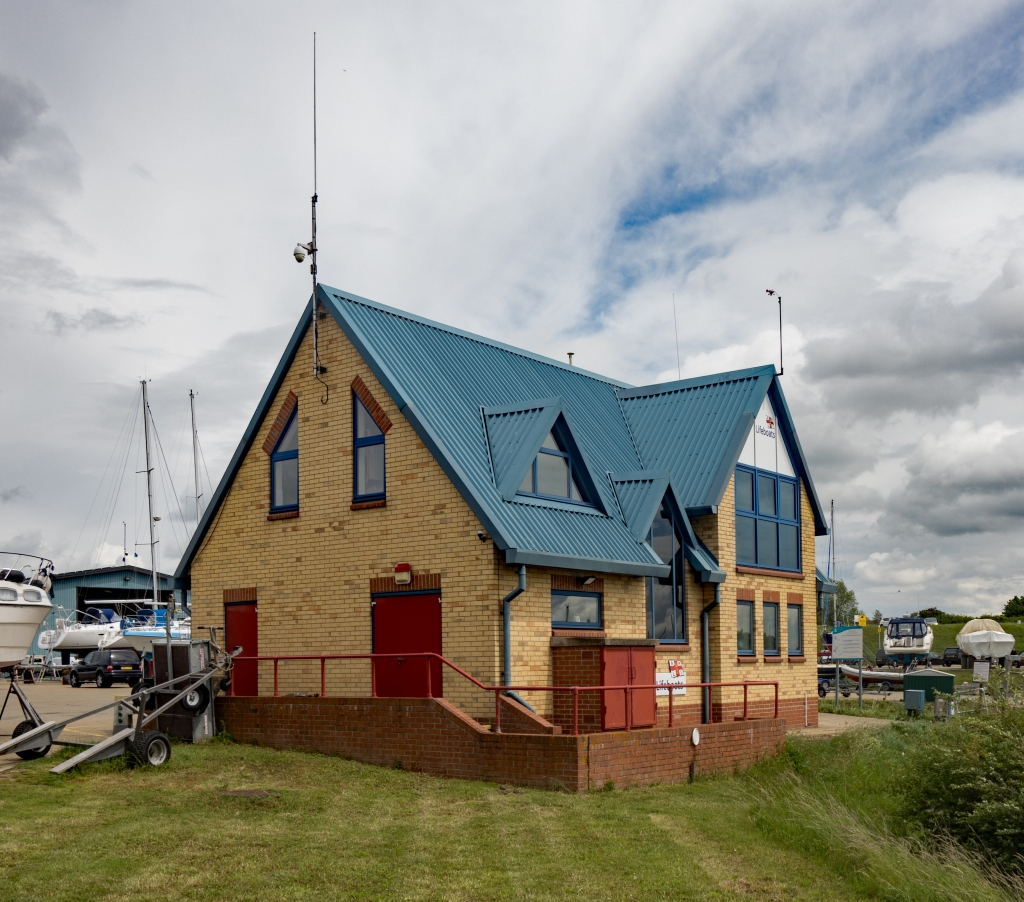
- Burnham-on-Crouch Lifeboat Station

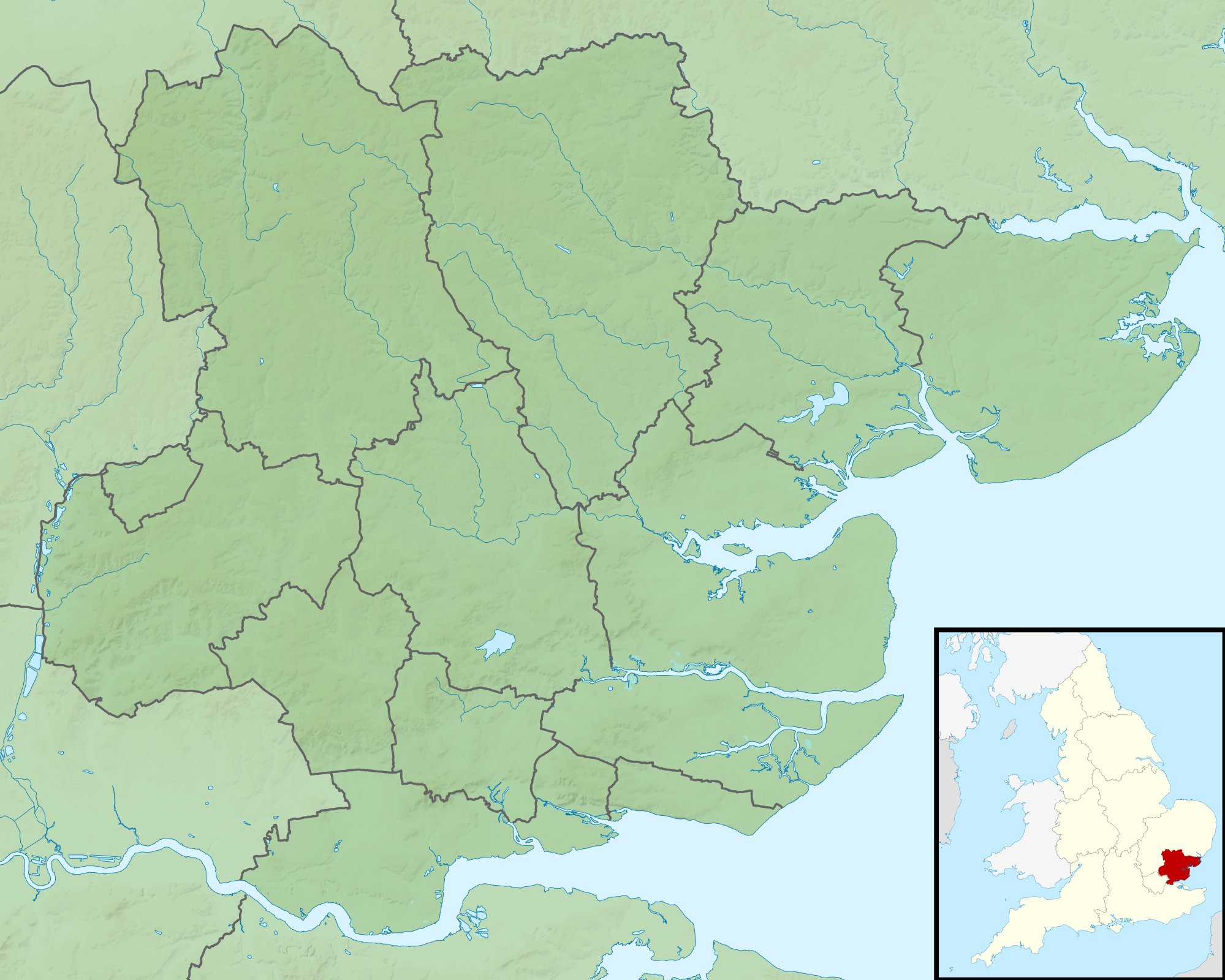
- Location within Essex

General information
- Type: RNLI Lifeboat Station
- Location: Burnham Yacht Harbour, Foundry Lane, Burnham on Crouch, Essex, CM0 8BL, England
- Coordinates: 51°37′45.0″N 0°48′09.0″E
- Opened: May 1966
- Owner: Royal National Lifeboat Institution

Website
- Burnham-on-Crouch RNLI Lifeboat Station

Burnham-on-Crouch Lifeboat Station is located at the end of Foundry Lane at Burnham Yacht harbour, in Burnham-on-Crouch, a town sitting on the north bank of the River Crouch, 20 miles (32 km) south east of Chelmsford, on the south side of the Dengie Peninsula, in the county of Essex.

A D-class (RFD PB16) Inshore lifeboat was first stationed at Burnham-on-Crouch by the Royal National Lifeboat Institution (RNLI) in May 1966.

The station currently operates a B-class (Atlantic 85) Inshore lifeboat, Tony and Robert Britt (B-849), on station since 2011, and the smaller D-class (IB1) Inshore lifeboat, David and Barbara Chapman (D-807), on station since 2017.

== History ==
In 1964, in response to an increasing amount of water-based leisure activity, the RNLI placed 25 small fast Inshore lifeboats around the country. These were easily launched with just a few people, ideal to respond quickly to local emergencies.

More stations were opened, and in May 1966, a lifeboat station was established at Burnham-on-Crouch, with the arrival of a D-class (RFD PB16) Inshore lifeboat, the unnamed D-95.

However, it was decided to close the station in 1968, as it was felt that there were sufficient rescue assets in the area, and D-95 was withdrawn at the end of the summer season. This decision was soon rescinded, following a move by the RAF to withdraw the rescue helicopters from RAF Manston. D-class (RFD PB16) D-73 was placed at Burnham-on-Crouch in 1969.

From the beginning, the D-class lifeboat had been kept at the Royal Corinthian Yacht Club, but the slipway was narrow and steep, and there was no room for expansion for extra facilities. When it was proposed to place an additional and larger B-class (Atlantic 21) Inshore lifeboat at Burnham-on-Crouch, the ideal solution was to relocate to the current site at Burnham Yacht Harbour. Plans for the construction of a two-storey lifeboat station were approved, and work started in April 1996. The building was completed at a cost of £97,000 in October 1996.

With a sheltered floating pontoon available at the harbour, it was decided that the best method to house the boat would be a floating boathouse. Drawing on the experience of two earlier floating boathouses previously installed at Poole and Brighton, a third boathouse was designed by Poole-based Consulting Engineer John Pattisson. Considering the sheltered location at Burnham, the boat can enter the boathouse bow first, and then be lifted out of the water on an A-frame, with the bow-end pivoted, with the stern lifted out of the water by electrically-driven hydraulics working through two cables. This presented fewer construction challenges than stern first boathouses, which need to consider different lowering methods due to the engines. In case of a power-failure, a mechanical hand pump can raise the boat, and a valve can be released to lower again. Construction began in May 1996, completing in September 1996, at a cost of £61,000.

The first of the Atlantic 75-class lifeboats constructed, Susan Peacock (B-700), was temporarily placed at Burnham from the relief fleet, arriving on station on 1 October 1996. On 14 February 1997, Burnham-on-Crouch would receive their permanent Atlantic 75-class station boat, Brandy Hole (B-733). The lifeboat had been partly financed through the fundraising efforts of the Brandy Hole yacht club. This was soon followed on 12 May 1997, by the arrival of a new D-class (EA16) Inshore lifeboat, Ernest and Rose Chapman (D-519).

A new floating boathouse for the D-class lifeboat was constructed in 2002, completed in July 2002, at a cost of £73,364.

On 11 August 2011, Brandy Hole (B-733) was withdrawn to the relief fleet. The boat was subsequently loaned to Portishead Lifeboat Trust, prior to Portishead lifeboat station being adopted by the RNLI. Burnham would receive the new larger Atlantic 85-class. Provided from the bequest of Mr Geoffrey Brian Britt, along with a gift from Mrs Patricia Britt, the boat was named Tony & Robert Britt (B-849).

At a ceremony of 3 June 2017, the new D-class (IB1) Inshore lifeboat was named David and Barbara Chapman (D-807). The £48,000 lifeboat was the third boat to be funded by David and Barbara Chapman of Burnham-on-Crouch, having previously funded both Ernest and Rose Chapman (D-519) and Ernest and Rose Chapman II (D-672), after David's parents.

== Station honours ==
The following are awards made at Burnham-on-Crouch.

- Member, Order of the British Empire (MBE)

Robert Anthony Glaze, Lifeboat Operations Manager – 2005QBH

== Burnham-on-Crouch lifeboats ==
=== D-class ===
Op.No. (Note: Op. No. is the RNLI's Operational Number of the boat or vehicle carried on the hull.)	Name	On station	Class	Comments
D-95	Unnamed	1966–1968	D-class (RFD PB16)	
Station Closed 1968–1969
D-73	Unnamed	1969–1973	D-class (RFD PB16)	
D-93	Unnamed	1973–1975	D-class (RFD PB16)	
D-231	Unnamed	1976–1986	D-class (Zodiac III)	
D-335	Unnamed	1987–1997	D-class (EA16)	
D-519	Ernest and Rose Chapman	1997–2007	D-class (EA16)	
D-672	Ernest and Rose Chapman II	2007–2017	D-class (IB1)	
D-807	David and Barbara Chapman	2017–	D-class (IB1)	

=== B-class ===
Op.No.	Name	On station	Class	Comments
B-700	Susan Peacock	1996–1997	B-class (Atlantic 75)	
B-733	Brandy Hole	1997–2011	B-class (Atlantic 75)	
B-849	Tony and Robert Britt	2011–	B-class (Atlantic 85)	

== See also ==
- List of RNLI stations
- List of former RNLI stations
- Royal National Lifeboat Institution lifeboats
