= West Kirby Lifeboat Station =

RNLI lifeboat station in Merseyside, England

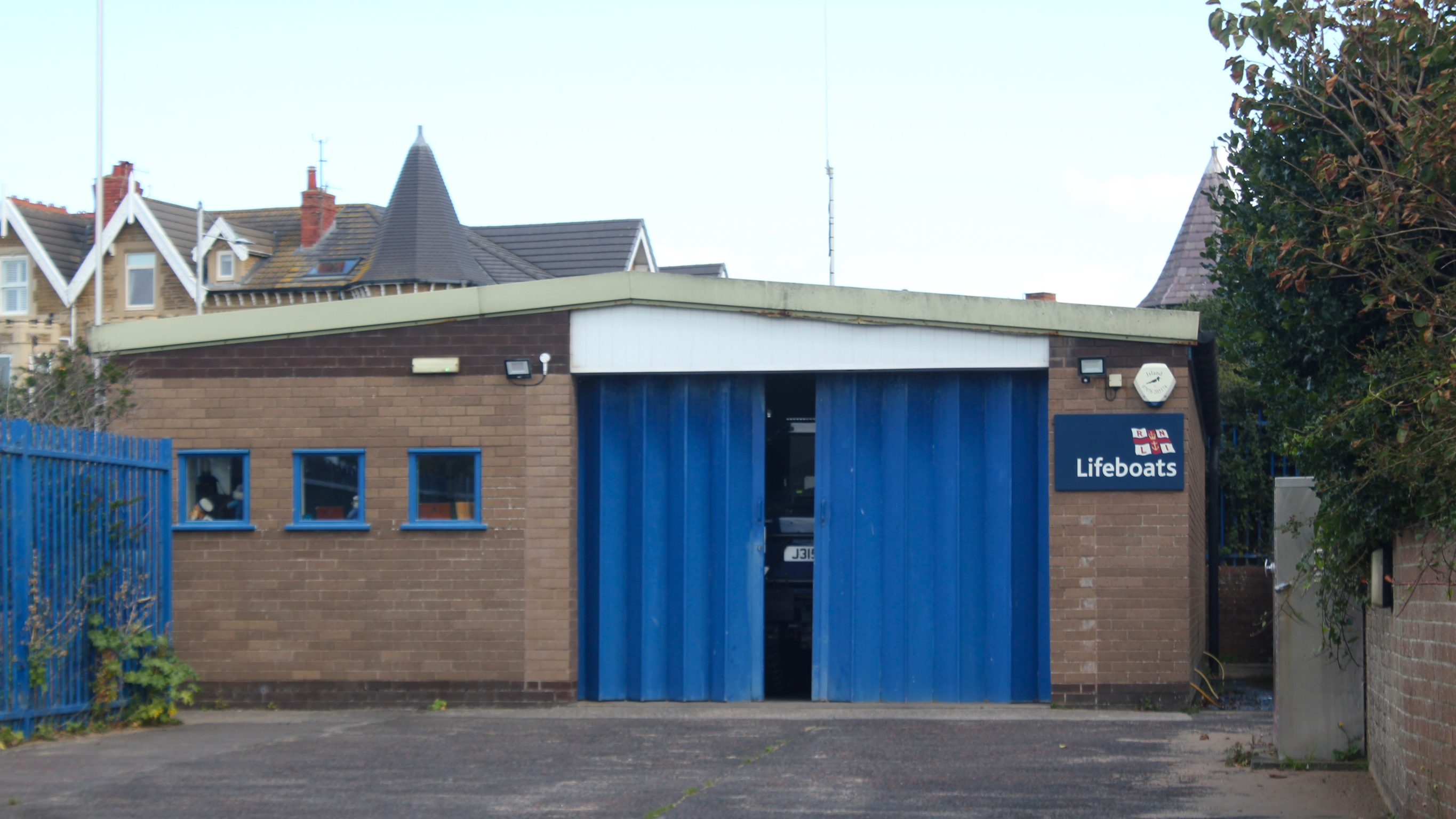
- West Kirby Lifeboat Station

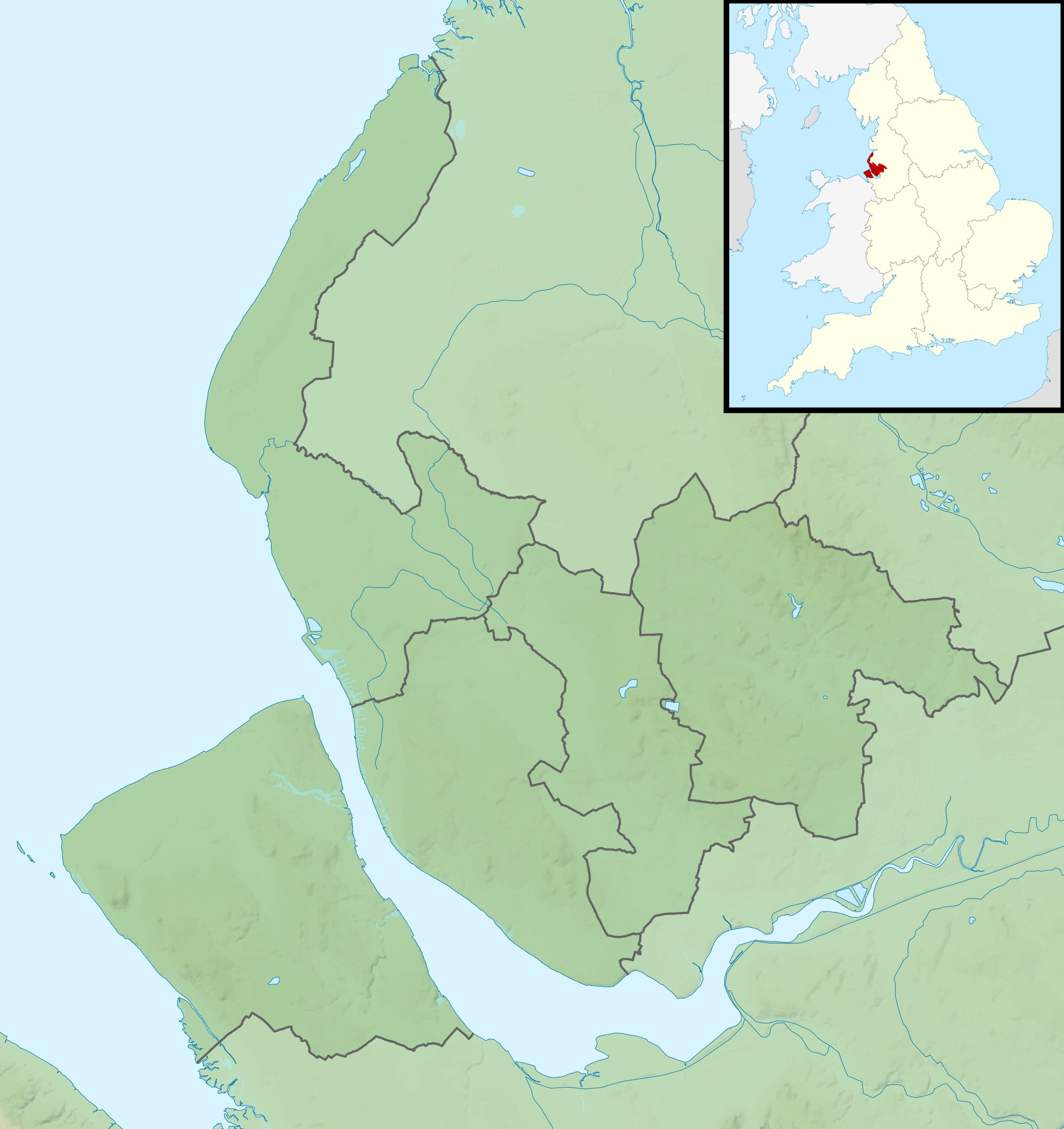
- Location within Merseyside

General information
- Type: RNLI Lifeboat Station
- Location: Coronation Gardens, South Parade, West Kirby, Wirral, Merseyside, CH48 3JU, England
- Coordinates: 53°21′57.8″N 3°10′56.4″W
- Opened: 1966
- Owner: Royal National Lifeboat Institution

Website
- West Kirby RNLI Lifeboat Station

West Kirby Lifeboat Station is located at Coronation Gardens, in the town of West Kirby, on the Wirral Peninsula in Merseyside.

A lifeboat was first stationed at West Kirby in 1966 by the Royal National Lifeboat Institution (RNLI).

The station currently operates a D-class (IB1) Inshore lifeboat, the Leonard Pownell (D-883), on station since 2023.

== History ==
A rise in coastal leisure activity, bathers, dinghies, small boats, etc. prompted the RNLI to introduce their small fast D-class (RFD PB16) Inshore lifeboats in 1963. Launching an All-weather lifeboat was a time consuming act, and often too slow in these circumstances.

A tragic accident in the River Dee brought about discussion between the RNLI and local authorities, and it was decided to place Inshore lifeboats at both Flint and West Kirby. A D-class (RFD PB16) (D-100) Inshore lifeboat was placed on service at West Kirby in June 1966, the responsibility of which was assigned to the Hoylake RNLI Honorary Secretary. The boat was temporarily located at West Kirby Sailing Club, until a boathouse could be constructed on the promenade.

Only 2 months later in August 1966, she was proven as a necessary resource, when the crew were able to resuscitate a man, unconscious in the water from a capsized small boat.

As was usual at the time, Inshore lifeboats were on station seasonally, so a different boat (D-14) was provided in 1967, but she was swiftly followed by D-155, which then became the station boat from 1967 to 1975.

A training session was held in March 1980 on the techniques of mouth-to-mouth resuscitation. A call came in at the end of the session, for two canoeists in the water, being swept away in the fast tide. The D-class (Zodiac III) lifeboat Miss Winfield (D-230) was launched within two minutes. Arriving on scene to find one man unconscious, and the other in poor condition, crewman Robert Lydiate immediately put his training to use. Both men recovered, with Helm Ronald Jones, and crew members Robert Lydiate and John Curry receiving 'Letters of Thanks' signed by the RNLI Chief of Operations.

Two horses got stuck in the mud in 1988. The D-class lifeboat was carried over the sand to the location, and thus ensued a 2-hour battle to release the horses in the rising tide, the crew ending up waist-deep in water. Both horses were finally released only 20 minutes before high-water. For this rescue, the 11 crew were collectively awarded a bronze medal by the RSPCA.

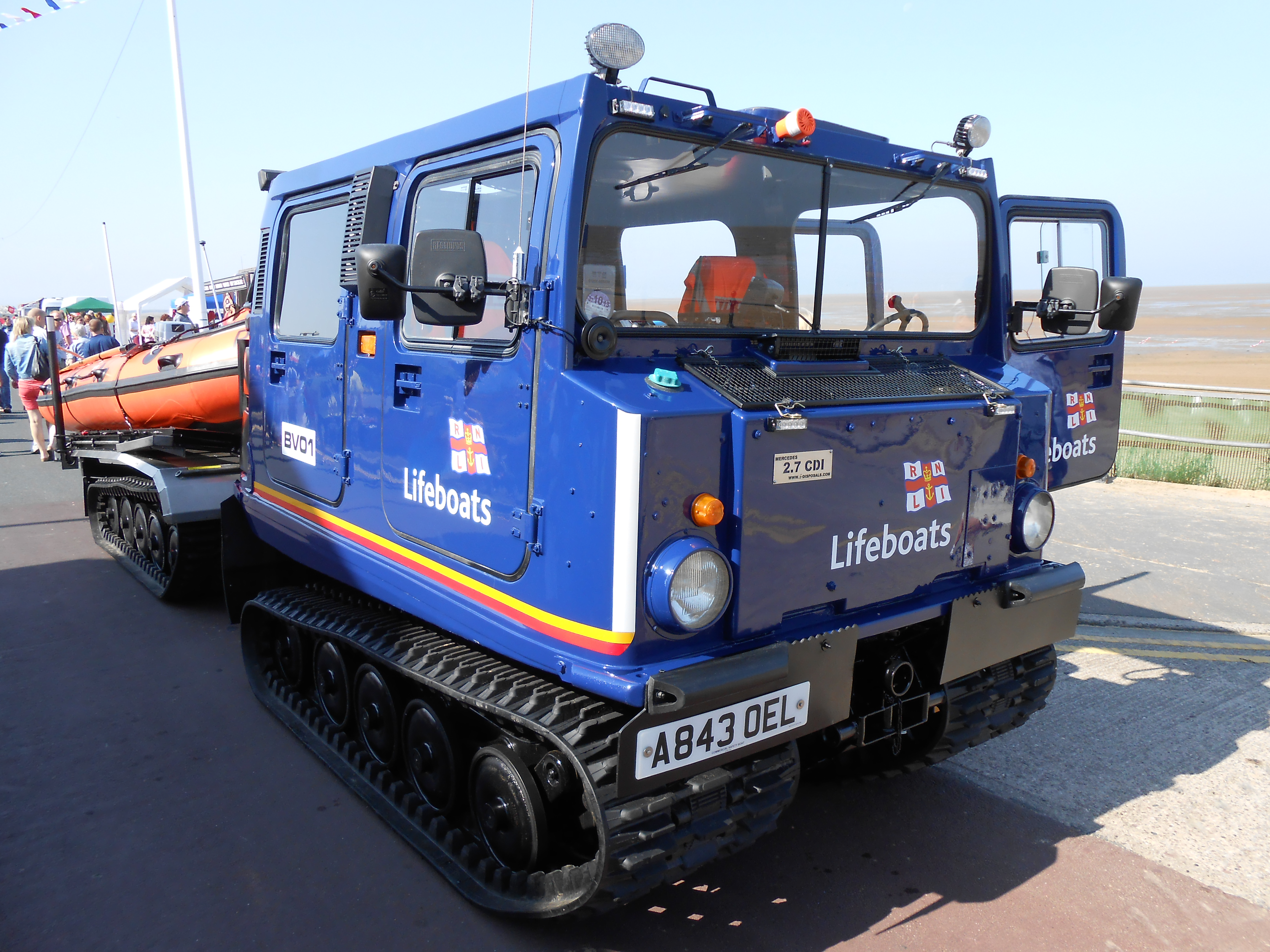
West Kirby Hellgeth-Hägglund BV206 (BV01) crew / launch vehicle

In February 1990, the boathouse was severely damaged due to flooding on the promenade after a storm, and was subsequently demolished. A new boathouse was constructed at Coronation Gardens, completed in 1991, able to house both launch vehicle and lifeboat, along with providing modern crew facilities, and an office and workshop.

Due to the often long distance to the water, with the continuing silting of the area, the station operates a Hellgeth-Hägglund BV206 crew and launch vehicle, the only one in service with the RNLI. This allows for swift transportation of both crew and Inshore lifeboat over the sand to ever changing launch points.

In the 2020 New Year Honours list, the British Empire Medal was awarded to Carole Ann Jackson, for her fundraising efforts over 50 years.

40 years service with the RNLI by Jonathan 'Jono' Dodd at both West Kirby and Hoylake was recognised in 2026, when he was awarded the MBE in the 2026 Birthday Honours.

== Station honours ==
The following are awards made at West Kirby:

- Letter of Thanks, signed by the Chairman of the Institution
  Ronald Jones, Helm – 1980
  John Curry – 1980
  Robert Lydiate – 1980
- Bronze Medal, awarded by the RSPCA
  Richard Booth – 1989
  Richard Farnworth – 1989
  Andrew Fowler – 1989
  G. Hanson – 1989
  D. Henshaw – 1989
  Harry Jones (DLA) – 1989
  Malcolm Jones – 1989
  Ron Jones (SHS) – 1989
  P. Langley – 1989
  Guy Watkins – 1989
  Eric Welles – 1989
- The Alison Saunders’ Lifeguarding Award 2015
  awarded annually for the most valiant and courageous rescues performed by the charity’s lifeguards.
  Norman Proctor, lifeguard – 2016
  Michael Proctor, lifeguard – 2016
  Thomas Corlett, lifeguard – 2016
- British Empire Medal
  Carole Ann Jackson – 2020NYH
- Member, Order of the British Empire (MBE)
  Jonathan Myles Maxwell Dodd, Lifeboat Volunteer – 2026KBH

== West Kirby lifeboats ==
=== Inshore lifeboats ===
Op.No. (Note: Op. No. is the RNLI's Operational Number of the boat carried on the hull.)	Name	On station	Class	Comments
D-100	Unnamed	1966	D-class (RFD PB16)	
D-14	Unnamed	1967	D-class (RFD PB16)	
D-155	Unnamed	1967−1975	D-class (RFD PB16)	
D-230	Miss Winfield	1975−1987	D-class (Zodiac III)	
D-332	Unnamed	1987−1994	D-class (EA16)	
D-473	Thomas Jefferson	1994−2003	D-class (EA16)	
D-612	Dave and Trevor Jones	2003−2012	D-class (IB1)	
D-751	Seahorse	2012−2023	D-class (IB1)	
D-883	Leonard Pownall	2023−	D-class (IB1)	

=== Launch and recovery tractors ===
Op.No.	Reg. No.	Type	On station	Comments
BV01	A843 OEL	Hellgeth-Hägglund BV206	2013–	

== See also ==
- List of RNLI stations
- List of former RNLI stations
- Royal National Lifeboat Institution lifeboats
