= Bangor Lifeboat Station =

RNLI lifeboat station in County Down, Northern Ireland

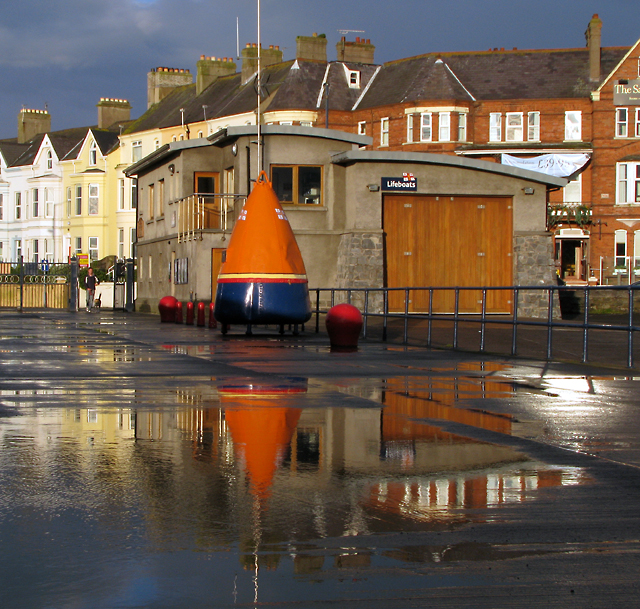
- Bangor Lifeboat Station

- Location within Northern Ireland

General information
- Type: RNLI Lifeboat Station
- Location: Sea Cliff Road, Bangor, County Down, BT20 5EY, Northern Ireland
- Coordinates: 54°39′56.6″N 5°40′01.8″W
- Opened: May 1965
- Owner: Royal National Lifeboat Institution

Website
- Bangor RNLI Lifeboat Station

Bangor Lifeboat Station is located at Sea Cliff Road, Bangor, a city located at the top of the Ards Peninsula, overlooking Belfast Lough, 13 miles (21 km) north-east of Belfast, in County Down, Northern Ireland.

A lifeboat was first stationed at Bangor in May 1965 by the Royal National Lifeboat Institution (RNLI).

The station currently operates the B-class (Atlantic 85) Inshore lifeboat, Ruby Robinson (B-944), on station since June 2024.

== History ==
In 1858, the RNLI opened a lifeboat station at Groomsport, Co. Down, just 2.5 miles (4.0 km) from the current station at Bangor. It operated for 62 years, until its closure in 1920.

For more information, please see:–

- Groomsport Lifeboat Station

In 1964, in response to an increasing amount of water-based leisure activity, the RNLI placed 25 small fast Inshore lifeboats around the country. These were easily launched with just a few people, ideal to respond quickly to local emergencies.

More stations were opened, and in May 1965, a lifeboat station was established at Bangor, with the arrival of a D-class (RFD PB16) Inshore lifeboat, the unnamed (D-40).

One of the first service calls for Bangor lifeboat, was on 15 June 1965, when the lifeboat was launched at 20:51, into gale-force conditions, to a dinghy in difficulties off Craigavad. Two people were taken on board the Inshore lifeboat, and the dinghy was towed to Cultra.

In total, four of the smaller D-class lifeboats were placed at Bangor, between 1965 and 1988. Two were funded from the bequest of the late Alan Thurlow Ashford.

A new station building, provided by North Down Borough Council was opened in 1984. At a ceremony on the 15 June 1984, Councillor Mrs Hazel Bradford declared the boathouse open, and the second Alan Thurlow Ashford lifeboat (D-301), was formally named and handed over to the station.

Alan Thurlow Ashford (D-301) was launched on 21 July 1987, after the station was alerted by Belfast Coastguard to reports of three men overboard, from a motor boat off Bangor Harbour. On arrival, one man was in poor condition and close to drowning. The two other men were left in the care of Ballyholme Yacht Club rescue boat, but the third was immediately returned to shore. It is reported that there was little doubt that the man would not have survived, was it not for the swift actions of the rescue services, and the prompt first aid administered.

Bangor would receive the larger twin-engined B-class (Atlantic 21) Inshore lifeboat on 25 March 1988. The William McCunn and Broom Church Youth Fellowship (B-513) was initially placed on service, but was followed by a permanent lifeboat on 21 November 1990, some of the funds for which had been raised by local children. On the extremely wet rainy day of Saturday 22 June 1991, H.R.H Prince Edward named the new Bangor Inshore lifeboat Youth of Ulster (B-584).

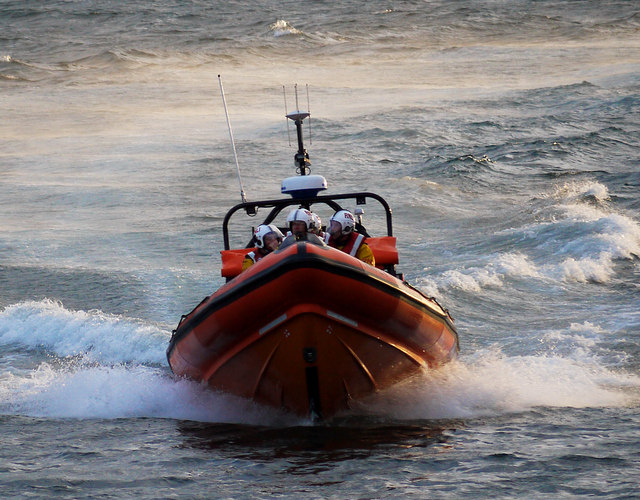
Bangor B-class (Atlantic 85) lifeboat Jessie Hillyard (B-805)

Youth of Ulster was retired in 2006. She was replaced by the new larger B-class (Atlantic 85). The lifeboat was the gift of Mrs Eileen Freeman, wife of RNLI Management Committee member Eric Freeman. The boat was named Jessie Hillyard (B-805) at a ceremony on 21 April 2007, in memory of her mother, the late Jessie Hillyard of Donaghadee. In her 18-years on station, Jessie Hillyard launched 643 times, spent 742 hours at sea, aided 626 people, and saved 20 lives.

Bangor received their replacement B-class (Atlantic 85) lifeboat, Ruby Robinson (B-944), in June 2024. The lifeboat was funded from the legacy of Norfolk farm hand Dennis Filby, who died in April 2019. Filby, of Hilborough, who had never married or had children, wished to leave the majority of his estate to fund a lifeboat, and be named in memory of the farmer's wife, Ruby Robinson, who had treated him like a son.

== Station honours ==
The following are awards made at Bangor, Co. Down:

- Member, Order of the British Empire (MBE)
  Brian Meharg – 2011QBH, For voluntary service to the RNLI, Bangor, County Down.

== Bangor lifeboats ==
=== D class ===
Op.No. (Note: Op. No. is the RNLI's Operational Number of the boat carried on the hull.)	Name	On station	Class	Comments
D-40	Unnamed	1965–1968	D-class (RFD PB16)	
D-162	Unnamed	1968–1969	D-class (RFD PB16)	
D-175	Alan Thurlow Ashford	1970–1983	D-class (RFD PB16)	
D-301	Alan Thurlow Ashford	1983–1988	D-class (RFD PB16)	

=== B class ===
Op.No.	Name	On station	Class	Comments
B-513	William McCunn and Broom Church Youth Fellowship	1988–1990	B-class (Atlantic 21)	
B-584	Youth of Ulster	1990–2006	B-class (Atlantic 21)	
B-805	Jessie Hillyard	2006–2024	B-class (Atlantic 85)	
B-944	Ruby Robinson	2024–	B-class (Atlantic 85)	

=== Launch and recovery tractors ===
Op.No.	Reg. No.	Type	On station	Comments
TA48	BJZ 8420	New Holland TN55D	2001–2008	
TA60	00-WX-6033	Landini GHBL1	2008–2009	
TA94	SF09 PVN	New Holland B5040	2009–	

== See also ==
- List of RNLI stations
- List of former RNLI stations
- Royal National Lifeboat Institution lifeboats
