= Worthing Lifeboat Station =

Former RNLI lifeboat station in West Sussex, England

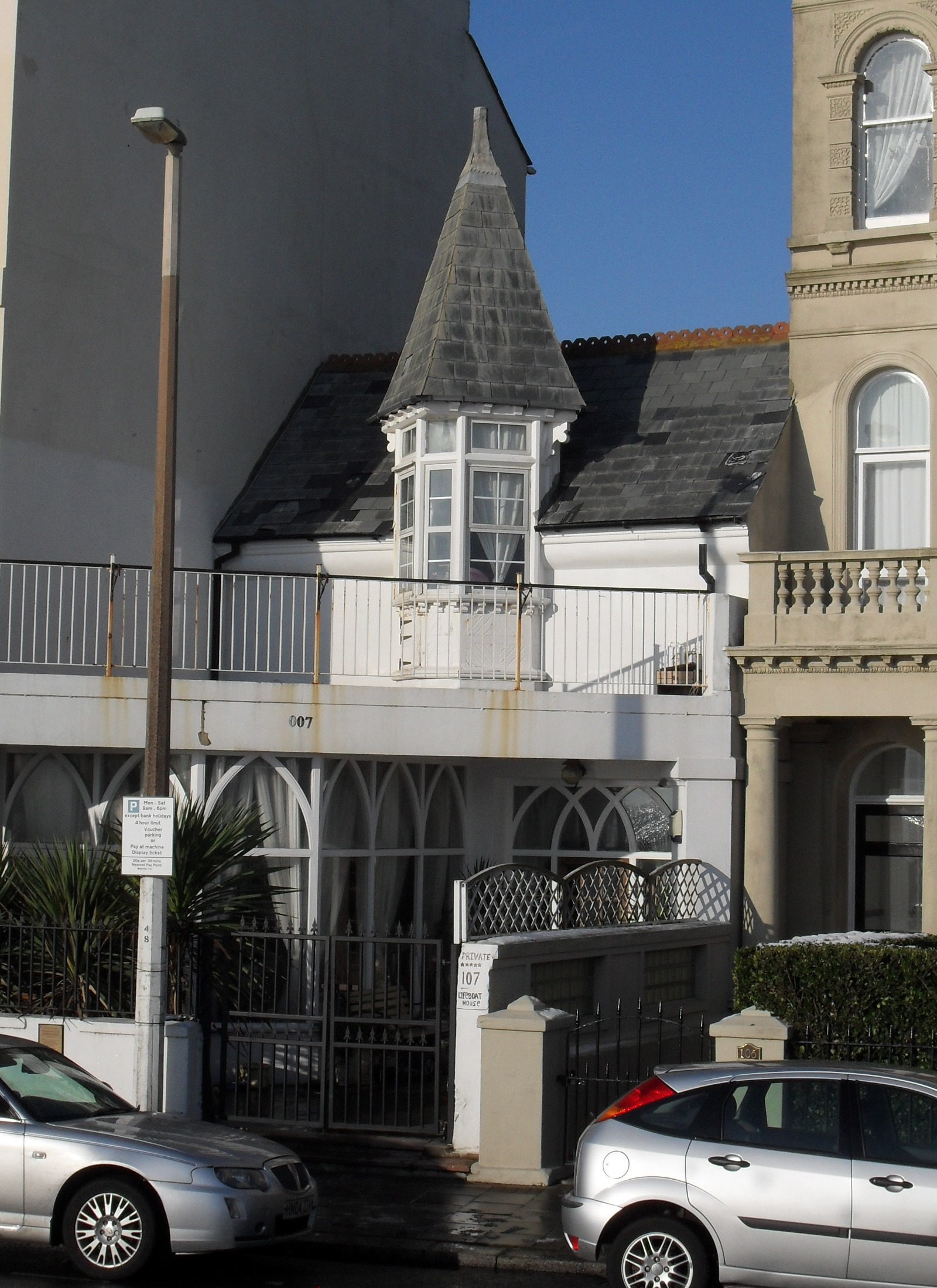
- Worthing Lifeboat Station.

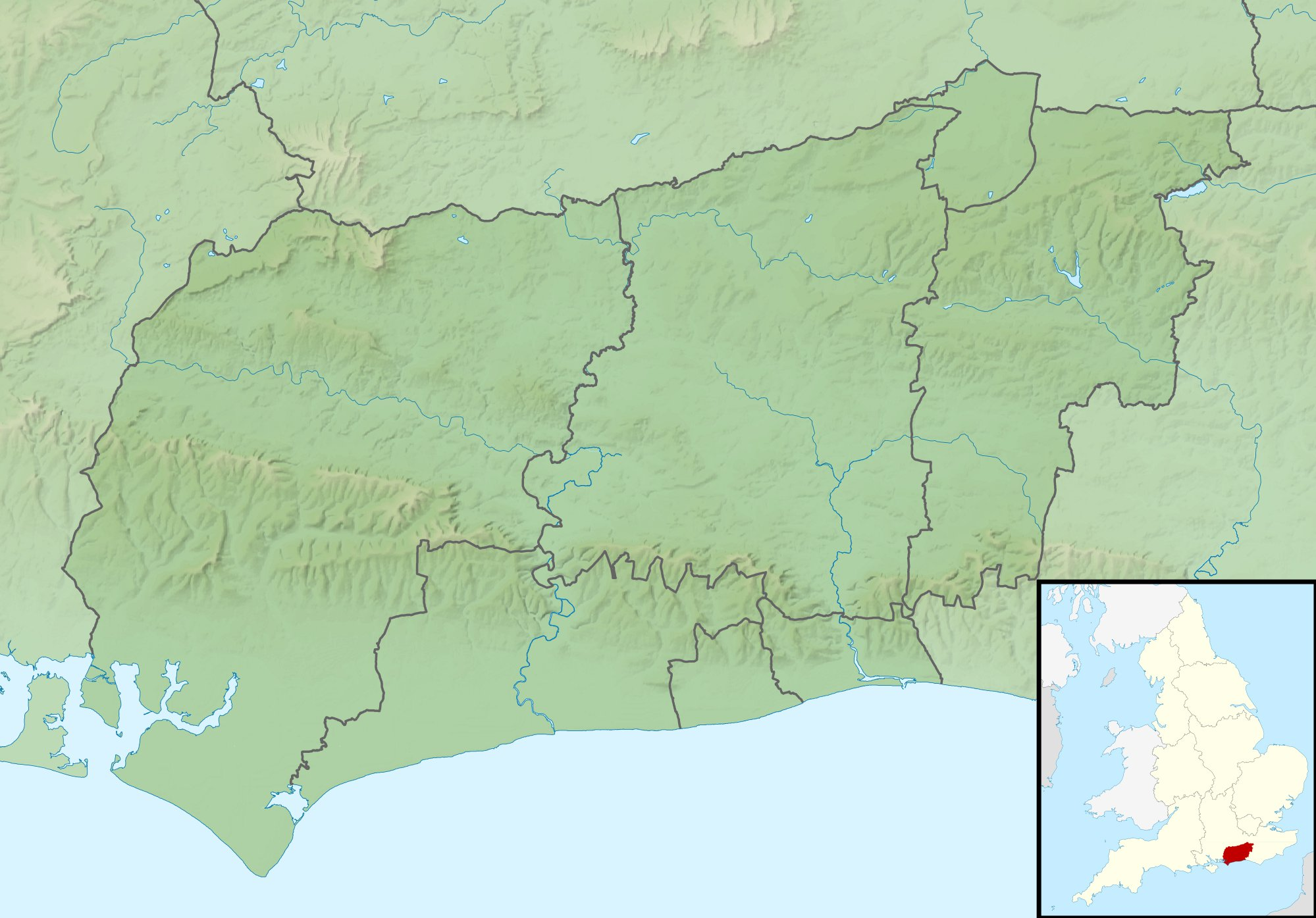
- Location within West Sussex

General information
- Status: Closed
- Type: RNLI Lifeboat Station
- Location: 107 Marine Parade, Worthing, East Sussex, BN11 3PP, England
- Coordinates: 50°48′30.98″N 0°22′43.7″W
- Opened: 1853–1930: 1964–1967 ILB

Worthing Lifeboat Station was latterly located on Marine Parade in Worthing, a seaside town on the south coast of West Sussex, England.

A lifeboat was first stationed at Worthing in 1853. Management of the station was transferred to the Royal National Lifeboat Institution (RNLI) in 1865.

Worthing lifeboat station first closed in 1930. An Inshore lifeboat station was established at Worthing by the RNLI in 1964, but operated for just three years, closing in 1967.

== History ==
In 1850, the barque Lalla Rookh, bound for London carrying rum and sugar, was seen in distress off Worthing. 11 fishermen set out in a small ferry boat Lady Lump, but the boat capsized on the way, and all 11 men were lost. The barque and crew were saved, after another boat set out with 20 men aboard, of which 12 boarded the Lalla Rookh, and helped sail her to her destination in London. A nationwide appeal for the dependents of those lost raised £5000.

As a result, it was decided that a lifeboat for Worthing was required. A further £120 was raised for the provision of a lifeboat, and a 27-foot self-righting 'Pulling and Sailing' (P&S) lifeboat, one with sails and (10) oars, was built by Harvey's of Littlehampton, and arrived in Worthing in 1853. She was housed in a boathouse opposite the coastguard station.

On the 5 June 1860, the crew of the schooner Plough, on passage from Whitby, to Arundel, Sussex, were rescued by the Worthing lifeboat, when the vessel was driven ashore and wrecked.

A letter of 6 February from Admiral Hargood of Worthing was read at a meeting of the RNLI committee of management on Thursday 2 March 1865, and with regard to the recent report of the Inspector of Lifeboats following his visit to the town, it was decided to take on the management of the lifeboat station. A new 32-foot self-righting lifeboat was provided in 1866, at a cost of £242, and a new boathouse was constructed on Crescent Road for £310. Funded by the gift of £582 from Miss M. Wasey, the lifeboat was named Jane.Alfred Dean was appointed Coxswain, and Tom Blann Second Coxswain.

The crew of the brigantine Hilena were rescued by the Worthing lifeboat Jane on 27 December 1868. Lifeboatmen later boarded the vessel, and she was recovered to Shoreham-by-Sea.

Crescent Road boathouse was sold in 1875 for £160, and a new 40-foot boathouse was constructed at a cost of £610 on Marine Parade, close once again to the coastguard station. In 1880, the lifeboat was renamed Henry Harris, following a large donation from a local business man and philanthropist. A slightly larger 34-foot lifeboat, arriving in Worthing in 1887, would also be named Henry Harris (ON 109).

In the storm on the 11 November 1891, the Henry Harris (ON 109) would be launched twice. Seven men would be rescued from the schooner Kong Karl of Kristiania (Oslo), which was driven ashore at Worthing. After landing the men, the lifeboat would launch again to the barque Capella of Hamburg, rescuing another seven men. For these services, Coxswain Charles Lee would be awarded the RNLI Silver Medal. Lee would later receive a second silver medal (Second-Service clasp) in 1898, awarded on his retirement for accumulated services over 19 years.

An accident that claimed the life of Lifeboat man Charles Lambeth was reported in the Worthing Gazette on 3 April 1895. Finding that a launch was not required, the lifeboat was being pulled on its carriage by horses back to the boathouse. Mr. Lambert attempted to leave the boat whilst the carriage was still in motion, but slipped and was run over by the carriage wheels.

Henry Harris (ON 109) was replaced in 1901. Funded by donations raised in Birmingham, the 35-foot lifeboat was paraded through the town and at a ceremony named Richard Coleman (ON 466), followed by a demonstration in the water watched by a crowd of thousands.

In 1910, the Worthing lifeboatmen would be called away from the funeral of former Coxswain and twice silver medal winner Lee Charles, to the aid of a rowing boat Mauretania from Shoreham-by-Sea, in difficulties off Worthing. The 4-man crew were rescued, all of which were themselves lifeboatmen from Shoreham Harbour.

In 1929, the silting of the harbour at Shoreham was removed, and the lifeboat station there was re-opened, with the placement of a 40-foot Watson lifeboat, Samuel Oakes (ON 651). With another motor-lifeboat further along the coast to the west at Selsey, the lifeboat at Worthing was no longer needed, and the Worthing Lifeboat Station was closed in 1930.

In response to the increase in water-based activity in the 1950s and 60s, the RNLI placed a D-class (RFD PB16) Inshore lifeboat at Worthing. These lifeboats were initially only on station for the summer months. However, with the placement of further Inshore boats at both Littlehampton and Shoreham Harbour in 1967, the Worthing Lifeboat Station was closed once again.

When the Worthing station on Marine Parade was closed in 1930, the building was made into a lifeboat museum, with the Richard Coleman (ON 466) left in situ. The museum remained open for 19 years, finally closing in 1949. The Richard Coleman was relocated, and placed on display, firstly at the National Maritime Museum, and then exhibited at Southend-on-Sea, but would be destroyed by arson there in 1972. The boathouse at Marine Parade was sold in 1950, but still remains, and is now a private residence.

In March 2015, the house was painted bright pink by the owner. It was restored to its original colour in August of the same year at the request of Worthing Borough Council.

== Station honours ==
The following are awards made at Worthing.

- RNLI Silver Medal

Charles Lee, Coxswain – 1891

Charles Lee, Coxswain – 1898 (Second-Service clasp)

== Roll of honour ==
In memory of those lost at Worthing.

- Launched to the aid of the barque Lalla Rookh in 1850, before there was a lifeboat, and lost when their boat capsized, November 1850

Harry Bacon
John Belville
James Edwards
Steve Edwards
Bill Hoskins
Harry Newman

Jim Newman
Jimmy Newman
John Newman
Harry Slaughter
Bill Wicks

- Collapsed and died on exercise, 1892

George Riddles (47)

- Run over and killed by the lifeboat carriage, 28 March 1895

Charles Lambeth (54)

- Drowned when the lifeboat capsized, whilst on service to the schooner Kings Hill, 17 February 1915

Edward. J. 'Jacko' Burgess (37)

== Worthing lifeboats ==
=== Pulling and Sailing (P&S) lifeboats ===
| ON (Note: ON is the RNLI's Official Number of the boat.) | Name | Built | On station | Class | Comments |
|---|---|---|---|---|---|
| Pre-257 | Unnamed | 1852 | 1853−1866 | 27-foot Peake Self-righting (P&S) | (Note: 27-foot x 7-foot (10-oared) Peake-class self-righting (P&S) lifeboat, built by Harvey of Littlehampton, costing £120.) |
| Pre-446 | Jane | 1865 | 1866−1880 | 32-foot Prowse Self-righting (P&S) | (Note: 32-foot x 7-foot 6in (10-oared) Prowse-class self-righting (P&S) lifeboat, gift of Miss M. Wasey of Newbury, Berkshire, built by Forrest of Limehouse, London, costing £242.); Renamed Henry Harris in 1880. |
| Pre-446 | Henry Harris | 1865 | 1880–1887 | 32-foot Prowse Self-righting (P&S) | (Note: Legacy of Mr H. Harris of Streatham.) |
| 109 | Henry Harris | 1887 | 1887−1901 | 34-foot Self-righting (P&S) | (Note: 34-foot x 7-foot 6in (10-oared) self-righting (P&S) lifeboat, legacy of Mr H. Harris of Streatham, built by Woolfe of Shadwell, London, costing £371.) |
| 466 | Richard Coleman | 1901 | 1901−1930 | 35-foot Self-righting (P&S) | (Note: 35-foot x 8-foot 6in (10-oared) self-righting (P&S) lifeboat, gift of Mrs B. Davies-Coleman of Birmingham, built by Thames Ironworks of Blackwall, London, costing £826.) |

Station closed, 1930.
Pre ON numbers are unofficial numbers used by the Lifeboat Enthusiast Society to reference early lifeboats not included on the official RNLI list.

=== Inshore lifeboats ===
| Op. No. (Note: Op. No. is the RNLI's Operational Number of the boat carried on the hull.) | Name | On station | Class | Comments |
|---|---|---|---|---|
| D-10 | Unnamed | 1964 | D-class (RFD PB16) | |
| D-28 | Unnamed | 1965 | D-class (RFD PB16) | |
| D-36 | Unnamed | 1965 | D-class (RFD PB16) | |
| D-27 | Unnamed | 1965–1967 | D-class (RFD PB16) | |

Station closed, 1967

== See also ==
- List of RNLI stations
- List of former RNLI stations
- Royal National Lifeboat Institution lifeboats
