= Whitstable Lifeboat Station =

RNLI lifeboat Station in Kent, England

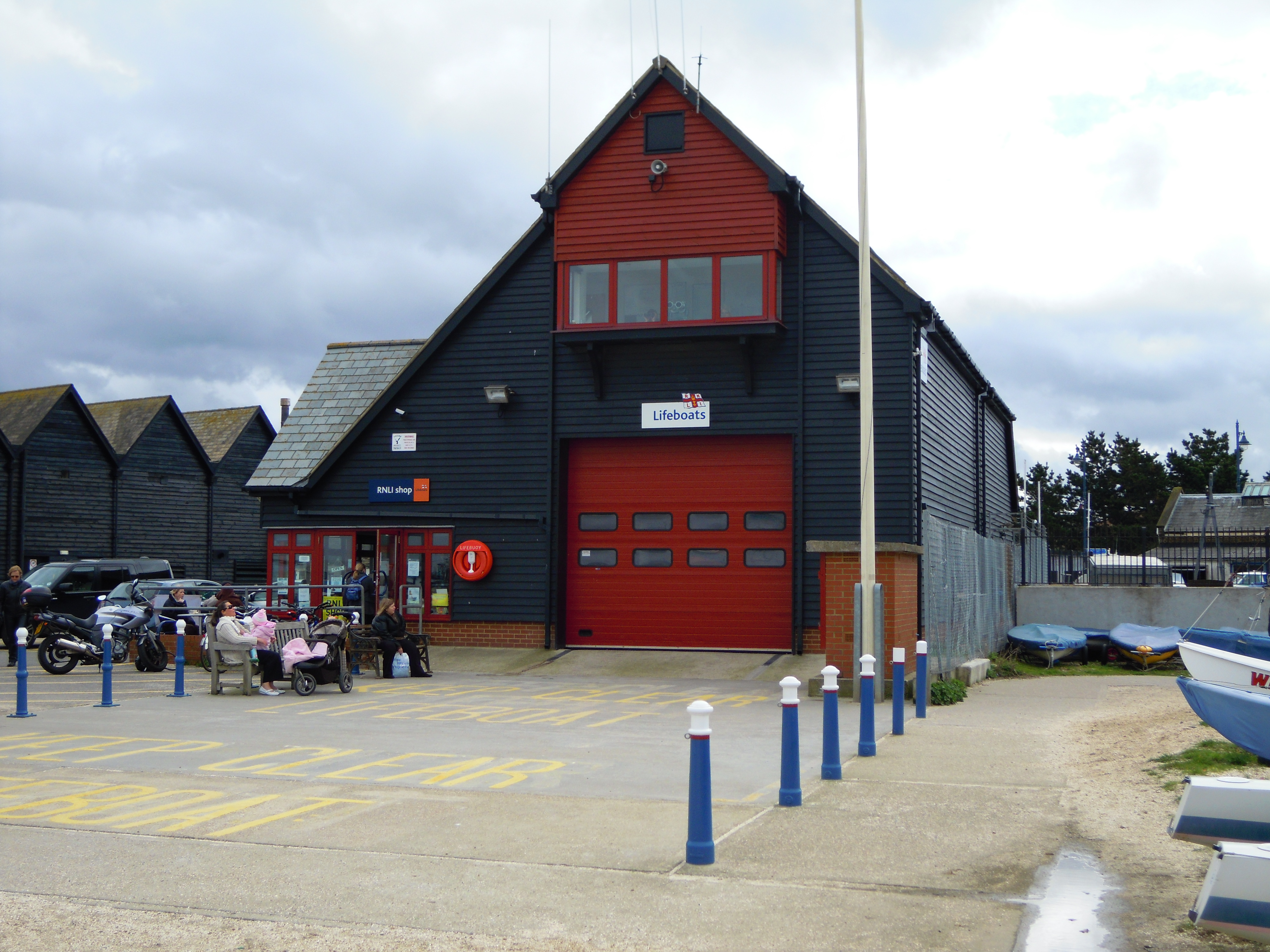
- Whitstable Lifeboat Station.

- Location within Kent

General information
- Type: RNLI Lifeboat Station
- Location: Whitstable Lifeboat Station, The Harbour,, Whitstable, Kent, CT5 1AB, England
- Coordinates: 51°21′44.5″N 1°1′32″E
- Opened: 1963
- Owner: Royal National Lifeboat Institution

Technical details
- Material: Fabricated steelwork clad with timber, and concrete

Website
- Whitstable RNLI Lifeboat Station

Whitstable Lifeboat Station is located at Whitstable, a town overlooking the eastern end of The Swale, a tidal channel of the Thames estuary (that separates the Isle of Sheppey), sitting on the north coast of Kent.

A lifeboat station was first established at Whitstable by the Royal National Lifeboat Institution (RNLI) in 1963.

The station currently operates a B-class (Atlantic 85) Inshore lifeboat, Lewisco (B-877), on station since 2014.

== History ==
In 1962, the number of rescues or attempted rescues by All-weather lifeboats in the summer months was 98, with the number of lives rescued being 133. In 1963, in response to an increasing amount of water-based leisure activity, the RNLI began trials of small fast Inshore lifeboats, placed at various locations around the country. These were easily launched with just a few people, ideal to respond quickly to local emergencies. This quickly proved to be very successful. In 1963, there were 226 rescues or attempted rescues in the summer months, as a result of which 225 lives were saved.

One of the first places chosen for a new Inshore lifeboats was Whitstable, in Kent. A new station was established in July 1963, with the arrival of a D-class (RFD PB16) Inshore lifeboat, which was kept at East Quay. At the time, D-class Inshore lifeboats were placed on station just for the summer season, and many boats were moved around to different stations. Whitstable are recorded as having six different D-class Inshore lifeboats between 1963 and 1974.

In 1974, the smaller D-class was withdrawn, and replaced with the larger twin-engined RIB, the B-class (Atlantic 21) Whitstable Branch (B-516).

Boathouse accommodation has been improved over the years. A single storey extension was added to the side of the boathouse in 1989, to improve crew facilities. In 2000, a completely new station was constructed, to provide new crew facilities, and house the larger B-class (Atlantic 75) Oxford Town & Gown (B-764).

A number of awards have been made to Whitstable crew members. "The Thanks of the Institution inscribed on Vellum" was accorded for service in 1977, 1981 and 1986. It was again accorded in 2010, along with the "Walter and Elizabeth Groombridge Award", which was awarded for the most meritorious rescue by an Inshore lifeboat crew in 2009.

On 28 May 2000, the Whitstable lifeboat was launched into a force 8–9 gale and rough seas, to the aid of the fishing dory Angelina. Three crew were saved from the sinking boat. Helm David Parry was awarded the RNLI Bronze Medal.

The "Dan Davies Competition" for first aid and seamanship skills is held annually, in memory of Whitstable general practitioner Dan Davies, who served as medical officer to the lifeboat station.

In 2023, Whitstable Lifeboat Station celebrated its 60th anniversary.

== Station honours ==
The following are awards made at Whitstable.

- RNLI Bronze Medal

David Parry, Helm – 2000

- The Thanks of the Institution inscribed on Vellum

David Victor Foreman, Helm – 1977

Michael A. Judge, Helm – 1981

Michael Gambrill, Helm – 1986

Jonathon Carter – 2010

- The Walter and Elizabeth Groombridge Award 2009
  (for the outstanding inshore lifeboat rescue of the year)

Jonathon Carter – 2010

- Member, Order of the British Empire (MBE)

Michael Judge, crew member – 2001QBH

David Andrew Lamberton, Former Helm, Lifeboat Operations Manager – 2003NYH

- British Empire Medal

John Richard Hill, Volunteer Shop Manager – 2025KBH

== Whitstable lifeboats ==
=== D-class ===
Op. No. (Note: Op. No. is the RNLI's Operational Number of the boat carried on the hull.)	Name	On station	Class	Comments
D-2	Unnamed	1963–1965	D-class (RFD PB16)	
D-24	Unnamed	1965	D-class (RFD PB16)	
D-28	Unnamed	1965	D-class (RFD PB16)	
D-45	Unnamed	1965–1968	D-class (RFD PB16)	
D-49	Unnamed	1968–1969	D-class (RFD PB16)	
D-45	Unnamed	1969–1970	D-class (RFD PB16)	
D-182	Unnamed	1970–1974	D-class (RFD PB16)	

=== B-class ===
Op. No.	Name	On station	Class	Comments
B-516	Whitstable Branch	1974–1984	B-class (Atlantic 21)	
B-560	British Diver	1984–2000	B-class (Atlantic 21)	
B-764	Oxford Town & Gown	2000–2014	B-class (Atlantic 75)	
B-877	Lewisco	2014–	B-class (Atlantic 85)	

=== Launch and recovery tractors ===
Talus MB-764H tractor TW23Hc

Op. No.	Reg. No.	Type	On station	Comments
T54	MJT 722P	Case LA	1975–1977	
TW04	TEL 705R	Talus MB-764 County	1977–1994	
TW32	L161 LAW	Talus MB-764 County	1994–2000	
TW49Hb	W652 RNT	Talus MB-4H Hydrostatic (Mk1.5)	2000–2008	
TW59Hc	DU04 DVW	Talus MB-4H Hydrostatic (Mk2)	2008–2014	
TW23Hc	K805 CUX	Talus MB-4H Hydrostatic (Mk2)	2014–	

== Gallery ==
Whitstable Lifeboat Station

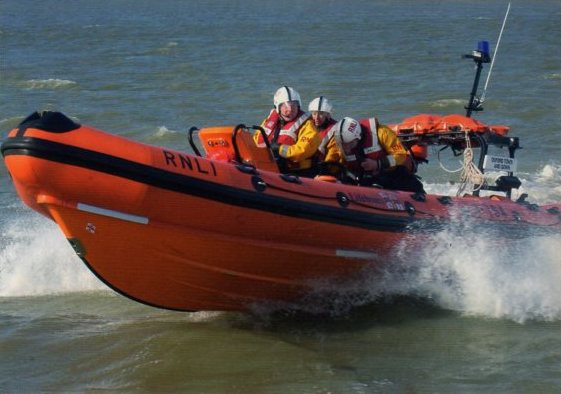
Oxford Town and Gown after launch

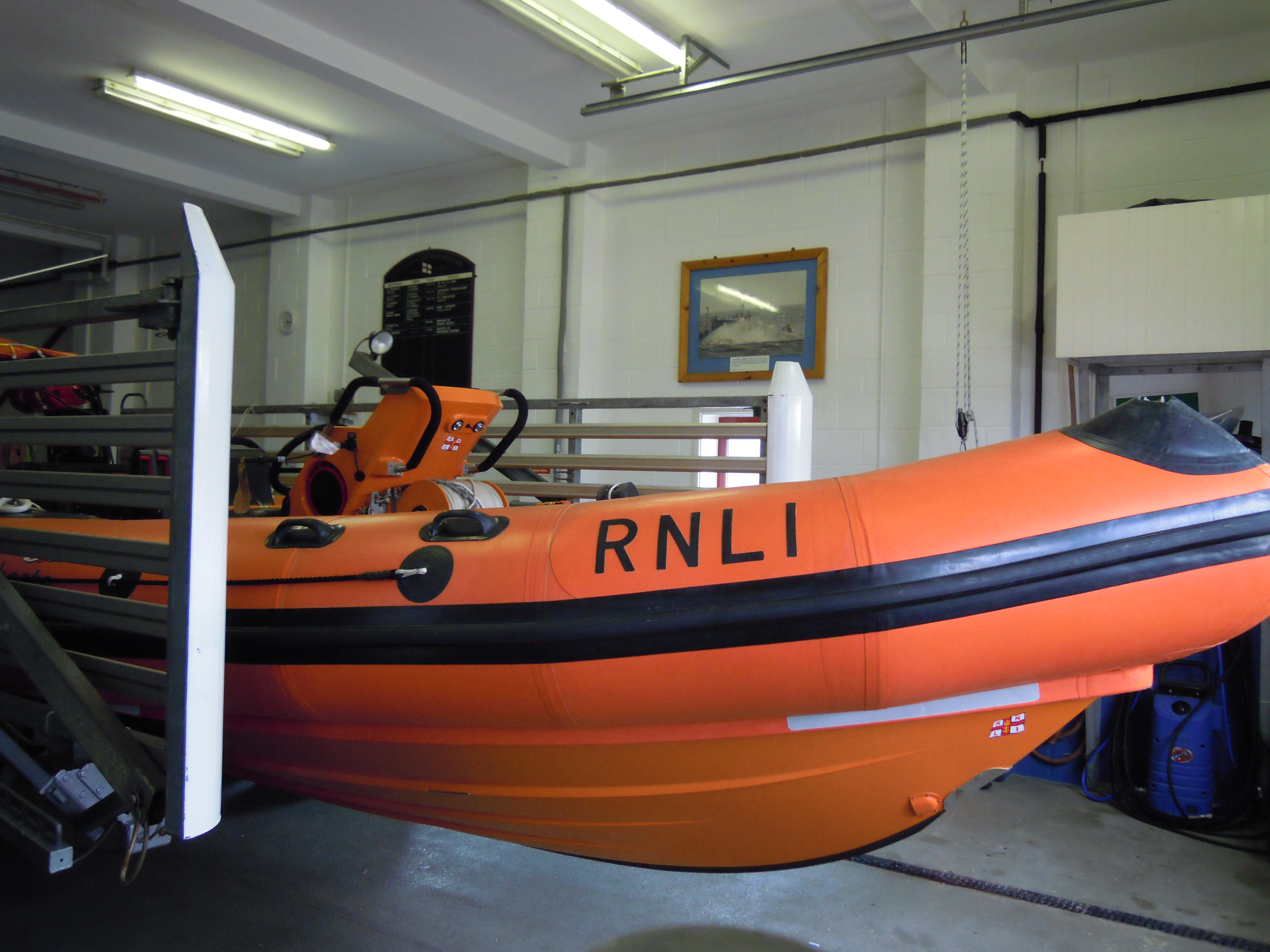
Oxford Town and Gown inside the boathouse

Lewisco being launched

Lewisco at sea

== See also ==
- List of RNLI stations
- List of former RNLI stations
- Royal National Lifeboat Institution lifeboats
