= West Mersea Lifeboat Station =

RNLI lifeboat station in Essex, England

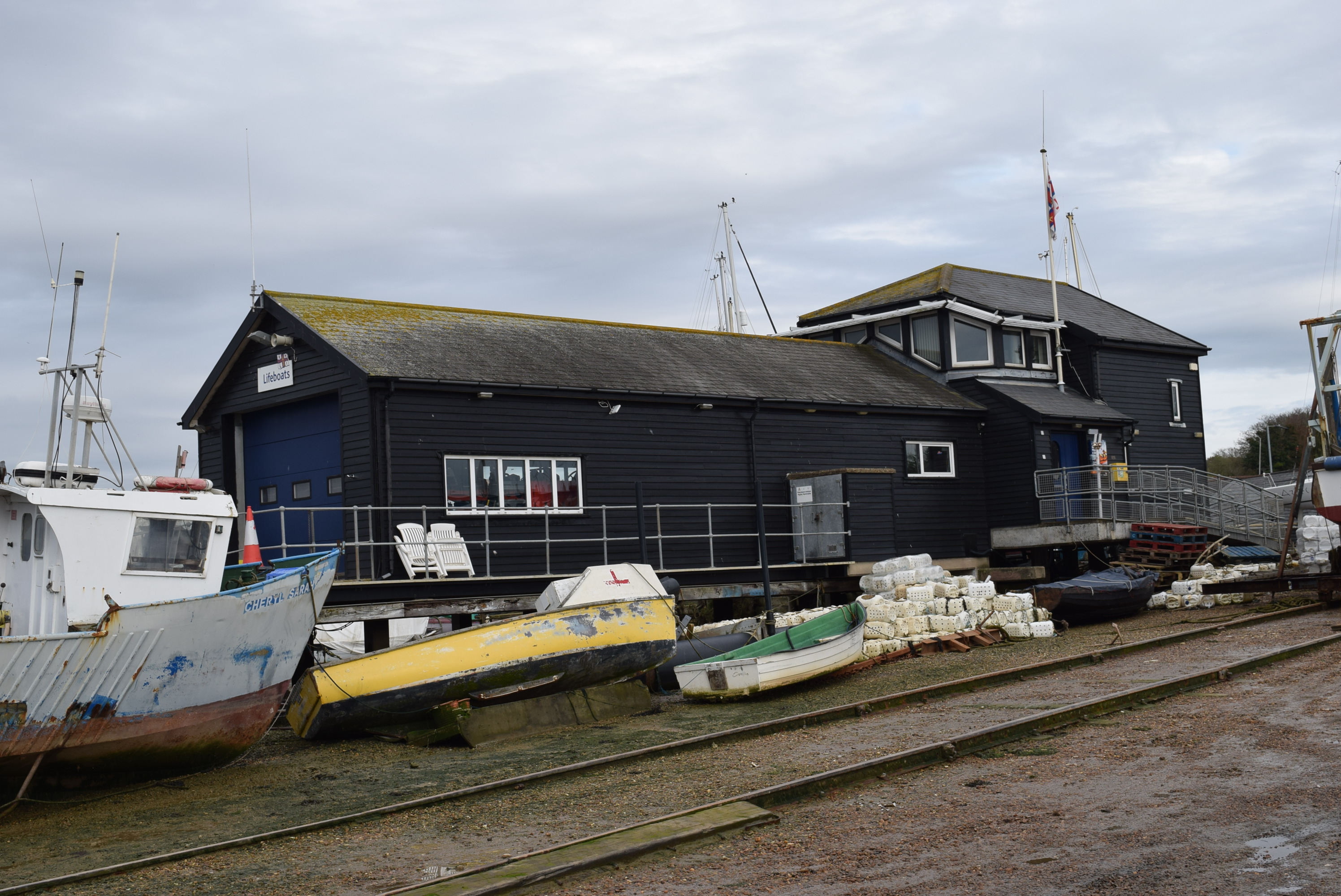
- West Mersea Lifeboat Station

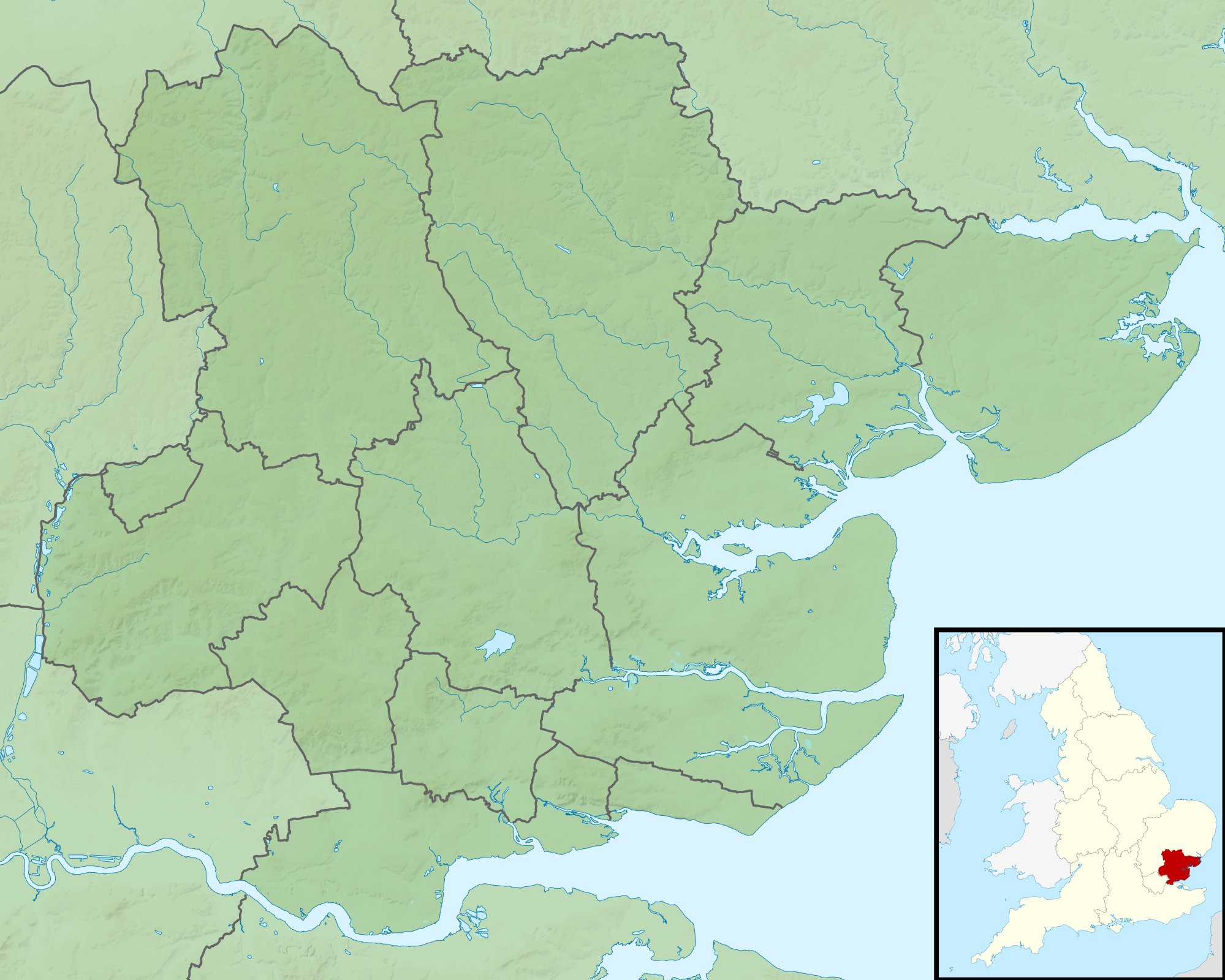
- Location within Essex

General information
- Type: RNLI Lifeboat Station
- Location: Coast Road, West Mersea, Essex, CO5 8PG, England
- Coordinates: 51°46′49″N 0°53′55″E
- Opened: July 1963
- Owner: Royal National Lifeboat Institution

Website
- West Mersea RNLI Lifeboat Station

West Mersea Lifeboat Station is located on the Coast Road in West Mersea, at the western end of Mersea Island, situated between the Blackwater and Colne river estuaries, 10 miles (16 km) south of Colchester, in the county of Essex.

An Inshore lifeboat was first stationed at West Mersea by the Royal National Lifeboat Institution (RNLI) in July 1963.

The station currently operates a B-class (Atlantic 85) Inshore lifeboat, Just George (B-879), on station since 2014.

== History ==
In 1962, the number of rescues or attempted rescues by All-weather lifeboats in the summer months was 98, with the number of lives rescued being 133. In 1963, in response to an increasing amount of water-based leisure activity, the RNLI began trials of small fast Inshore lifeboats, placed at various locations around the country. These were easily launched with just a few people, ideal to respond quickly to local emergencies. This quickly proved to be very successful. In 1963, there were 226 rescues or attempted rescues in the summer months, as a result of which 225 lives were saved.

One of the first places chosen for a new Inshore lifeboats was West Mersea, in Essex. A lifeboat station was established in July 1963, with the arrival of a D-class (RFD PB16) Inshore lifeboat, the unnamed (D-7). The lifeboat was housed in a shelter alongside the West Mersea Yacht Club. At the time, Inshore lifeboats were placed on station just for the summer season, and many boats were moved around to different stations. West Mersea are recorded as having seven different D-class Inshore lifeboats between 1963 and 1973.

In 1972, one of the first new larger twin-engined B-class (Atlantic 21) lifeboats, the unnamed lifeboat B-506, was placed at West Mersea. The D-class lifeboat D-108 was withdrawn to the relief fleet.

At 20:17 on Monday 31 July 1978, the West Mersea lifeboat Alexander Duckham (B-529) was launched to reports of two children missing in a canoe. En-route, with the weather now at force 7, the crew were informed that the two children were safe, but a flare had been sighted off Sales Point. Altering course, the lifeboat found the sloop Blackbird at anchor, but with her stern aground. Four people were rescued. A third reported incident diverted the lifeboat again, but turned out to be a false alarm. The Blackbird was recovered by a local fishing boat, with the lifeboat standing by. Helm Graham Knott was accorded 'The Thanks of the Institution inscribed on Vellum', with his two crew each receiving a 'Vellum Service Certificate'.

The Alexander Duckham (B-529) was launched at 17:00 on Saturday 26 May 1979, into a force 9 gale, to reports of a capsized dinghy. Arriving on scene to find nobody with the boat, crew member Jonathan French jumped into the water, to check the underside of the capsized boat, but found no-one. A search commenced, but the crew were later reported have made it ashore. Caught out by the conditions, several more boats were given assistance, with one man being recovered to hospital by a rescue helicopter. The lifeboat returned to base at 19:10. Helm James Albert Clarke was awarded 'The Thanks of the Institution inscribed on Vellum' for his seamanship, as was crewman French for his courage entering the water. Graham Knott was awarded a 'Vellum Service Certificate'.

By 1991, gifts, bequests, and a local fundraising appeal had raised £160,000, to provide West Mersea with a new lifeboat house, constructed 200 metres (660 ft) from the previous boathouse. Crew facilities were much improved, and the lifeboat now had direct access to the water. The station was formally opened on 10 September 1992 by H.R.H. The Duke of Kent.

Having had an Atlantic 21-class lifeboat on service for 29 years, West Mersea would receive the new improved Atlantic 75-class in 2001. The lifeboat was funded by the employees of Dignity Caring Funeral Services, who had raised over £81,000 with various fundraising events. The boat was duly named Dignity (ON 761)

The current lifeboat on station at West Mersea is an B-class (Atlantic 85), which arrived on station in October 2014. Over half the funding of the £214,000 lifeboat was from the bequest of Mr George Stribling of Weeley, Essex. At a ceremony on 31 May 2015, the lifeboat was named Just George (B-879) by TV personality Griff Rhys Jones OBE.

== Station honours ==
The following are awards made at West Mersea.

- The Thanks of the Institution inscribed on Vellum

Graham M. Knott, Helm – 1978

James Albert Clarke, Helm – 1979
Jonathan Paul French, crew member – 1979

- Vellum Service Certificate

Brian M. Jay, crew member – 1978
Jonathan Paul French, crew member – 1978

Graham M. Knott, crew member – 1979

- A Framed Letter of Thanks signed by the Chairman of the Institution

John Frost, Helm – 1993
Matthew Haward, crew member – 1993
Javis Wenlock, crew member – 1993

== West Mersea lifeboats ==
=== D-class ===
Op.No. (Note: Op. No. is the RNLI's Operational Number of the boat or vehicle carried on the hull.)	Name	On station	Class	Comments
D-7	Unnamed	1963	D-class (RFD PB16)	
D-5	Unnamed	1964–1965	D-class (RFD PB16)	
D-14	Unnamed	1965	D-class (RFD PB16)	
D-20	Unnamed	1965	D-class (RFD PB16)	
D-65	Unnamed	1965	D-class (Dunlop)	
D-32	Unnamed	1966–1967	D-class (RFD PB16)	
D-108	Unnamed	1967–1972	D-class (RFD PB16)	

=== B-class ===
Op.No.	Name	On station	Class	Comments
B-506	Unnamed	1972–1976	B-class (Atlantic 21)	
B-529	Alexander Duckham	1976–1987	B-class (Atlantic 21)	
B-570	Himley Hall	1987–2001	B-class (Atlantic 21)	
B-761	Dignity	2001–2014	B-class (Atlantic 75)	
B-879	Just George	2014–	B-class (Atlantic 85)	

=== Launch and recovery tractors ===
Op. No.	Reg. No.	Type	On station	Comments
TW48	V281 EUJ	Talus MB-764 County	2000–2009	
TW14	D659 TNT	Talus MB-764 County	2009–2019	
TW43	S540 UNT	Talus MB-764 County	2019–	

== See also ==
- List of RNLI stations
- List of former RNLI stations
- Royal National Lifeboat Institution lifeboats
