= Kippford Lifeboat Station =

RNLI Lifeboat station in Dumfries and Galloway, Scotland

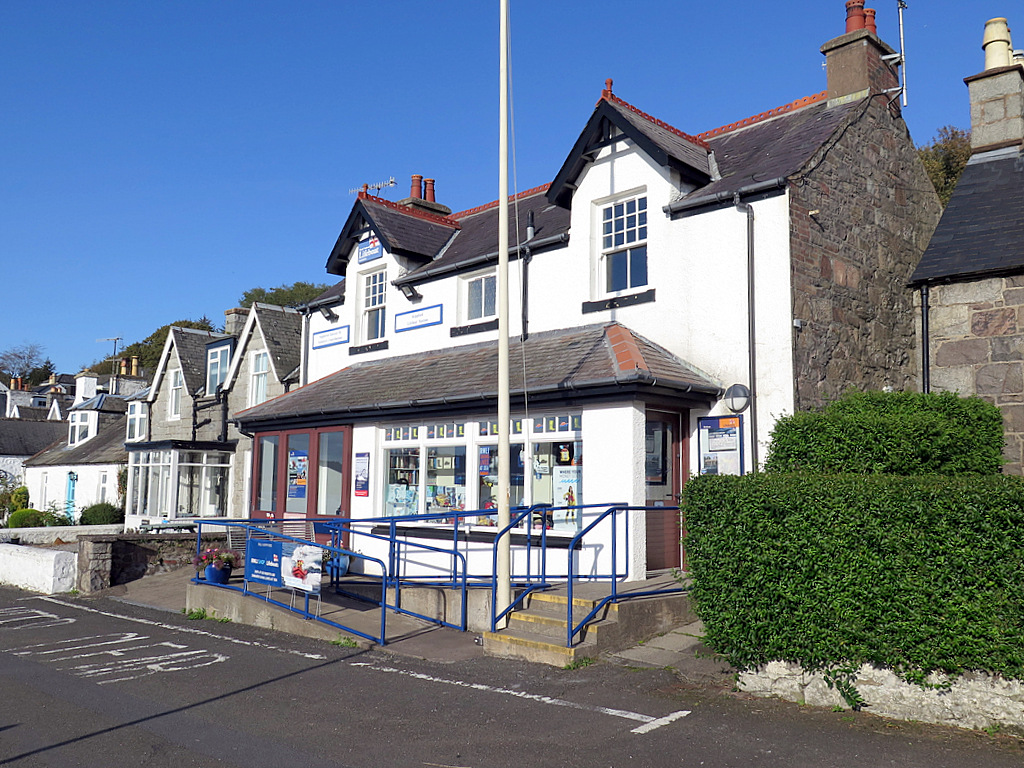
- Kippford Lifeboat Station

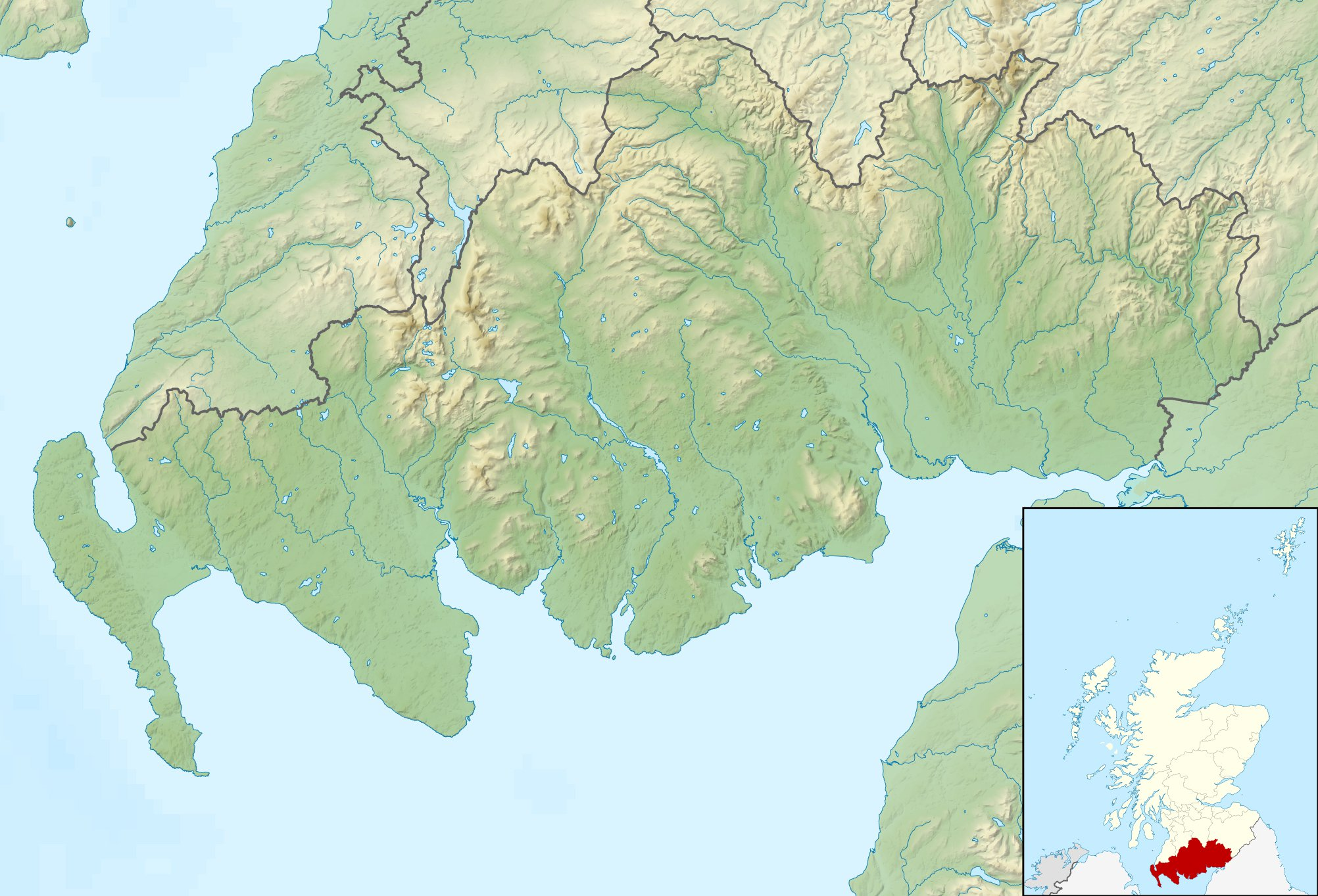
- Location within Dumfries and Galloway

General information
- Type: RNLI Lifeboat Station
- Location: Roughfirth Road, Kippford, Dumfries and Galloway, DG5 4LN, Scotland
- Coordinates: 54°52′35.4″N 3°48′48.3″W
- Opened: May 1966
- Owner: Royal National Lifeboat Institution

Website
- Kippford RNLI Lifeboat Station

Kippford Lifeboat Station is located on Roughfirth Road, Kippford, a small village on the east bank of the River Urr, which sits at the head of Rough Firth, on the Solway Firth, in Dumfries and Galloway.

An Inshore lifeboat was first stationed at Kippford by the Royal National Lifeboat Institution (RNLI) in May 1966.

The station currently operates a D-class (IB1) Inshore lifeboat, Ronnie Sinclair (D-854), on station since 2021.

== History ==
In 1964, in response to an increasing amount of water-based leisure activity, the RNLI placed 25 small fast Inshore lifeboats around the country. These were easily launched with just a few people, ideal to respond quickly to local emergencies.

More stations were opened, and in May 1966, a lifeboat station was established at Kippford, with the arrival of a D-class (RFD PB16) Inshore lifeboat, the unnamed (D-87). The station was operational only during the summer months.

On 24 August 1977, the yacht Albino, on passage from the Isle of Whithorn to Kippford, headed up the west side of Almorness Point, rather than the east side, and into the shallow Orchardton Bay. Realising the mistake, the yacht tried to anchor, but was driven ashore, with the rudder being torn from the boat. The Kippford lifeboat (D-135) was launched at 20:10, and the two crew were rescued, the yacht being recovered the following day.

In 1999, Kippford Lifeboat Station became operational all year round.

Ever since the opening in 1966, the lifeboat station had been operated out of a garage, with no crew facilities. In the summer of 2001, work was carried out to convert a house in the main street, to be the lifeboat station. The conversion was the idea of divisional RNLI inspector John Caldwell. A design by Architects Robert Potter & Partners to be in keeping with the surrounding buildings was agreed. Completed in autumn 2001, the station can now provide modern crew facilities, along with a retail outlet.

A new type D-class (IB1) Inshore lifeboat arrived at Kippford on 12 November 2009. The lifeboat, funded from the bequest of Mrs Catherine Frances Harrison, was duly named Catherine (D-718) at a ceremony on 17 April 2010.

Catherine was withdrawn from service in 2021. She was replaced on 28 April 2021 by the Ronnie Sinclair (D-854), funded from the bequest of the late Miss Sheila Sinclair of North Berwick, and named after her late brother.

== Station honours ==
The following are awards made at Kippford.

- A Letter of Appreciation, signed by the Chairman of the Institution

Kippford Lifeboat Station – 1977

== Kippford lifeboats ==
Op.No. (Note: Op. No. is the RNLI's Operational Number of the boat or vehicle carried on the hull.)	Name	On Station	Class	Comments
D-87	Unnamed	1966–1969	D-class (RFD PB16)	
D-65	Unnamed	1970	D-class (RFD PB16)	
D-98	Unnamed	1971	D-class (RFD PB16)	
D-135	Unnamed	1972–1977	D-class (RFD PB16)	
D-261	Unnamed	1978–1988	D-class (Zodiac III)	
D-370	41 Club II	1988–1999	D-class (EA16)	
D-477	Pride of Nuneaton and Bedworth	1988–1999	D-class (EA16)	
D-553	David Whitehead	2001–2009	D-class (EA16)	
D-718	Catherine	2009–2021	D-class (IB1)	
D-854	Ronnie Sinclair	2021–	D-class (IB1)	

=== Launch and recovery tractors ===
Op. No.	Reg. No.	Type	On Station	Comments
TA90	SF09 KZN	New Holland B3045	2009–2014	
TA92	SF09 KZM	New Holland B3045	2014–2015	
TA104	SF10 FCG	New Holland B2045	2015–	

== See also ==
- List of RNLI stations
- List of former RNLI stations
- Royal National Lifeboat Institution lifeboats
