= Bournemouth Lifeboat Station =

Former RNLI lifeboat station in Dorset, England

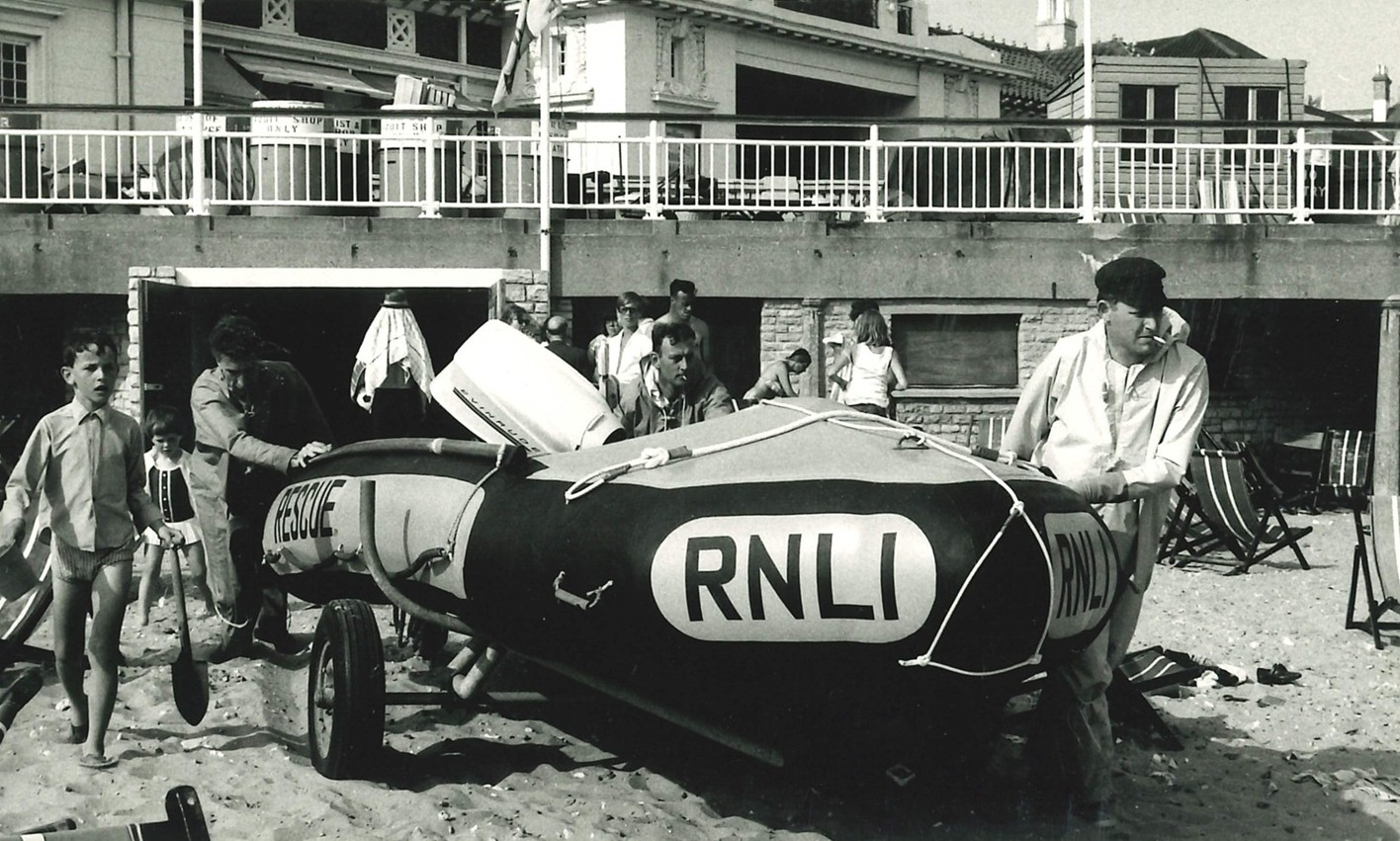
- Bournemouth RNLI Lifeboat Station 1971

- Bournemouth, Dorset

General information
- Status: Closed
- Type: RNLI Lifeboat Station
- Location: Bournemouth Pier, Pier Approach, Bournemouth, Dorset, BH2 5AA, England
- Coordinates: 50°42′57.5″N 1°52′33.1″W
- Opened: 1965
- Closed: 1972

Bournemouth Lifeboat Station was located underneath the pier at Bournemouth, a town and seaside resort approximately 30 miles south-west of Southampton, on the south coast of England, in the ceremonial county of Dorset.

A lifeboat was first placed at Bournemouth in 1965, by the Royal National Lifeboat Institution (RNLI).

After just 7 years of operation, Bournemouth lifeboat station was closed in 1972.

== History ==
In 1962, the number of rescues or attempted rescues by All-weather lifeboats in the summer months was 98, with the number of lives rescued being 133. In 1963, in response to an increasing amount of water-based leisure activity, the RNLI began trials of small fast Inshore lifeboats, placed at various locations around the country. This quickly proved to be very successful. In 1963, there were 226 rescues or attempted rescues in the summer months, as a result of which 225 lives were saved.

In 1964, the RNLI placed 25 small fast Inshore lifeboats around the country. These were easily launched with just a few people, and were ideal to respond quickly to local emergencies.

More stations were opened, and in May 1965, a lifeboat station was established at Bournemouth, with the arrival of an unnamed D-class (RFD PB16) Inshore lifeboat, (D-47).

A station was provided in the form of a store-room or garage, located directly underneath the shore end of Bournemouth Pier. This was provided by the local council, at no cost to the Institution.

As with nearly all Inshore stations at the time, the boats were initially on service for just the summer months. This resulted in a turnover of lifeboats, with D-15 being placed on station in 1967, and D-152 in 1968.

It is generally regarded that the lifeboat crew at Bournemouth were made up of local police officers, although no specific documentary evidence has been found to prove this. However, the sole successful rescue of 1968 was carried out by a Police Sergeant and Police Constable.

The station operated for just seven years, closing in 1972. The lifeboats had been launched 46 times, saving three lives.

== Notable Rescue ==
At 04:47 on 19 May 1968, a call was made from Southbourne Coastguard to the Bournemouth police station. The lifeboat was launched at 04:55, to the motor boat Clipper, reported on fire off Durley Chine.

On arrival on scene, the flames were soon extinguished, but nobody was found on board. Returning to a previously sighted oil slick, by now 05:15 and daylight, a man was spotted in the water, who indicated his son was also in the water, suffering from burns and shock. The boy and then the man were retrieved from the water, with a third man rescued 400 yards off shore. All three were landed and dispatched to hospital, before the crew returned to recover the boat. Awards were made to the two police officers for the rescue.

== Station honours ==
The following are awards made at Bournemouth.

- The Thanks of the Institution inscribed on Vellum

PS Douglas H. Carter, helm – 1968
PC Arthur Edward Farley, crew member – 1968

- The Ralph Glister Award 1968
  (for the most meritorious service of the year performed by a rescue boat crew)

PS Douglas H. Carter, helm – 1969
PC Arthur Edward Farley, crew member – 1969

== Bournemouth lifeboats ==
=== D-class Inshore lifeboats ===
Op. No. (Note: Op. No. is the RNLI's Operational Number of the boat.)	Name	On station	Class	Comments
D-47	Unnamed	1965–1967	D-class (RFD PB16)	
D-16	Unnamed	1967–1968	D-class (RFD PB16)	
D-152	Unnamed	1968–1972	D-class (RFD PB16)	

== See also ==
- List of RNLI stations
- List of former RNLI stations
- Royal National Lifeboat Institution lifeboats
