= D-class lifeboat (RFD PB16) =

Inshore lifeboat class of the RNLI

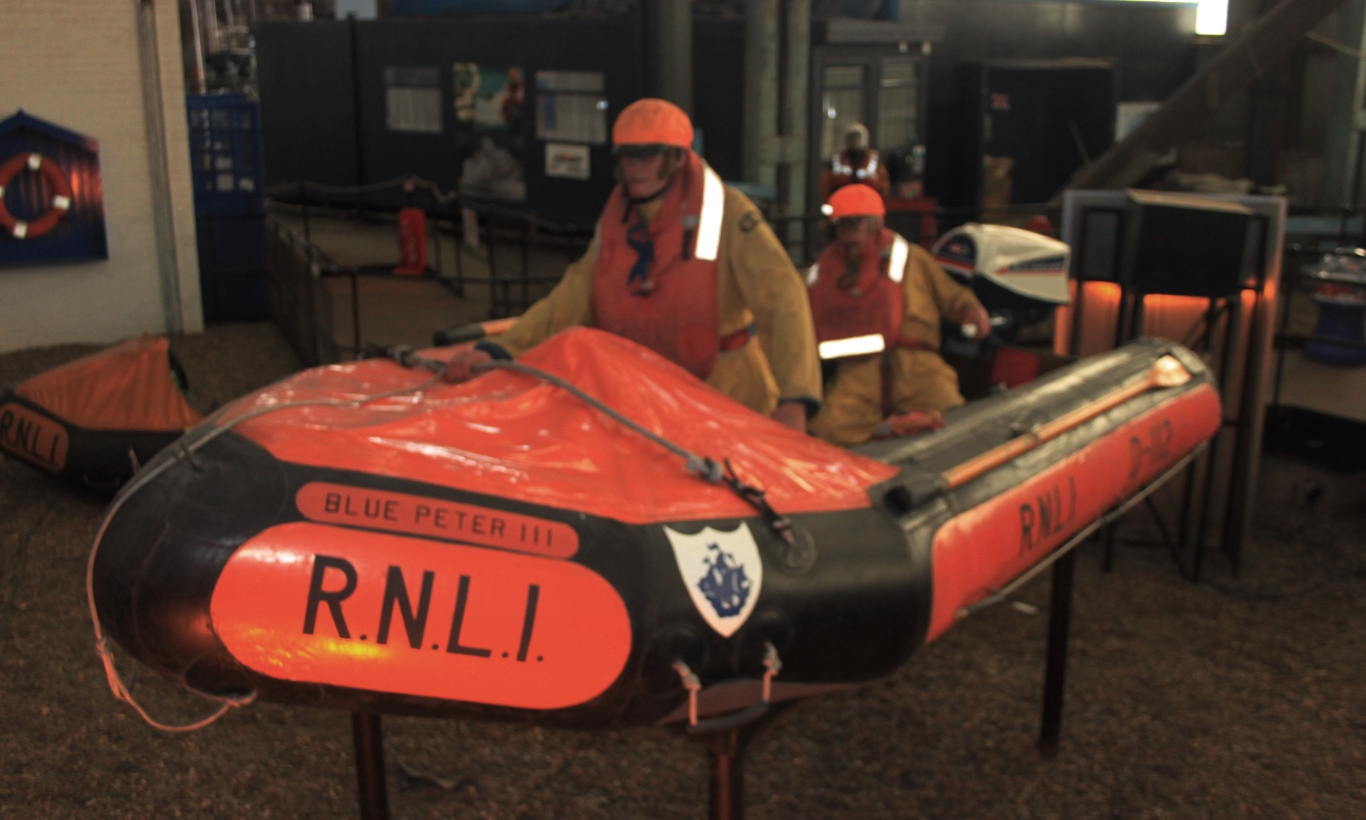
- Preserved Blue Peter III (D-112)

Class overview
- Name: D-class (RFD PB16)
- Builders: RFD
- Operators: Royal National Lifeboat Institution
- Preceded by: none
- Succeeded by: D-class (Zodiac III)
- Built: 1963–1984
- In service: 1963–2007
- Completed: 228
- Retired: 228
- Preserved: 2

General characteristics
- Class & type: RFD PB16
- Length: 16 ft (4.9 m)
- Complement: 2 or 3

The D-class (RFD PB16) lifeboat was the first of a class of inflatable boat operated between 1963 and 2007 by the Royal National Lifeboat Institution of the United Kingdom and Ireland. It was replaced operationally by the D-class (Zodiac III).

They were manufactured by R.F.D. Co.Ltd of Godalming, Surrey, a company founded by engineer Reginald Foster Dagnall. Over time, RFD became a synonym for "Rapid Flotation Devices".

== History ==
Increasing numbers of leisure craft in waters around Britain and Ireland in the late 1950s caused the RNLI to consider using inflatable boats as Inshore Lifeboats (ILBs). A boat was purchased for trials and the work of the lifesaving society in Brittany was studied. This resulted in RFD PB16 inflatables being modified and fitted out as ILBs.

The first was deployed at Aberystwyth in 1963. It capsized on its first launch but was soon put to good use. Once in service, the main problems came from the boats deflating and from the outboard motors failing. It was decided that these should be replaced every year.

Production continued until 1984, however two alternative designs were tried in 1971 and 1972. Only a few Avon S650 were built but the Zodiac III proved more successful and series production of these started in 1975 and continued until 1987. The last PB16 was withdrawn in 2002.

The RFD PB16 was 16 ft (4.9 m) long and fitted with a single 40 hp outboard motor.

All of the following fleet details are referenced to the 2026 Lifeboat Enthusiast Society Handbook, with information retrieved directly from RNLI records.

== RNLI Fleet ==
=== D-1 – D-100 ===
Op. No. (Note: Op. No. is the RNLI's Operational Number of the boat.)	Name	In service	Station	Comments
D-1	Unnamed	1963	Aberystwyth	
D-1	Unnamed	1965	Great Yarmouth and Gorleston	
D-1	Unnamed	1965–????	Relief fleet	
D-2	Unnamed	1964	Aberdovey	
D-2	Unnamed	1965	Whitstable	
D-3	Unnamed	1966	Relief fleet	
D-4	Unnamed	1963	Mudeford	
D-5	Unnamed	1963	Redcar	
D-5	Unnamed	1964	St Ives	
D-5	Unnamed	1965	West Mersea	
D-6	Unnamed	1963	Redcar	
D-6	Unnamed	1963	Southwold	
D-6	Unnamed	1966	North Sunderland	
D-7	Unnamed	1963	West Mersea	
D-7	Unnamed	1964	Mudeford	
D-7	Unnamed	1967	Southend-on-Sea	
D-8	Unnamed	1964	Bembridge	
D-8	Unnamed	1965	Wells-next-the-Sea	
D-8	Unnamed	1966	St Ives	
D-9	Unnamed	1963–1964	Great Yarmouth and Gorleston	
D-9	Unnamed	1965	Blackpool	
D-9	Unnamed	1966	St Ives	
D-1-P	Unnamed	1966–1973	Publicity	
D-10	Unnamed	1964	Worthing	
D-10	Unnamed	1965	Aberdovey	
D-11	Unnamed	1963	Wells-next-the-Sea	
D-11	Unnamed	1965	Mudeford	
D-11	Unnamed	1966	Relief fleet	
D-11	Unnamed	1967	Hastings	
D-12	Unnamed	1963–1964	Aberdovey	
D-12	Unnamed	1965	Tynemouth	
D-12	Unnamed	1965	Redcar	
D-12	Unnamed	1967	Redcar	
D-12	Unnamed	1968–1970	Abersoch	
D-2-P	Unnamed	1983–1987	Publicity	
D-13	No. Not Allocated			
D-14	Unnamed	1964	Walmer	
D-14	Unnamed	1965	Southwold	
D-14	Unnamed	1965	West Mersea	
D-14	Unnamed	1967	West Kirby	
D-14	Unnamed	1968	Harwich	
D-14	Unnamed	1969	Brighton	
D-15	Unnamed	1964	Barrow	
D-15	Unnamed	1965	Skegness	
D-15	Unnamed	1965–1983	Relief fleet	
D-3-P	Unnamed	1983–1988	Publicity	
D-16	Unnamed	1964	Pwllheli	
D-16	Unnamed	1965	Relief fleet	
D-16	Unnamed	1965–1966	St Ives	
D-16	Unnamed	1967–1968	Bournemouth	
D-16	Unnamed	1968–1969	Arbroath	
D-16	Unnamed	1969–1972	Relief fleet	
D-17	Unnamed	1964–1967	Broughty Ferry	
D-17	Unnamed	1967–1970	Relief fleet	
D-18	Unnamed	1965–1966	Bembridge	
D-4-P	Unnamed	1983–????	Publicity	
D-19	Unnamed	1964	Aberystwyth	
D-19	Unnamed	1965–1967	Aberdovey	
D-19	Unnamed	1967–1970	Relief fleet	
D-19	Unnamed	1970	Aberdovey	
D-20	Unnamed	1964	Yarmouth	
D-20	Unnamed	1965	West Mersea	
D-20	Unnamed	1965–1966	Pwllheli	
D-20	Unnamed	1967	Scarborough	
D-20	Unnamed	1968–1970	Mudeford	
D-20	Unnamed	1971–1972	Relief fleet	
D-21	Unnamed	1964	Hastings	
D-21	Unnamed	1965	Southend-on-Sea	
D-21	Unnamed	1965	Torbay	
D-21	Unnamed	1965–1966	Broughty Ferry	
D-21	Unnamed	1966	Walmer	
D-21	Unnamed	1967	Mudeford	
D-21	Unnamed	1967–1972	Relief fleet	
D-22	Unnamed	1964	Largs	
D-22	Unnamed	1965	Yarmouth	
D-22	Unnamed	1967	Yarmouth	
D-22	Unnamed	1967	Stonehaven	
D-22	Unnamed	1967–1969	Relief fleet	
D-5-P	Unnamed	1983–1988	Publicity	
D-23	Unnamed	1964	Torbay	
D-23	Unnamed	1970–1973	Relief fleet	
D-24	Unnamed	1965	Whitstable	
D-24	Unnamed	1966	Walmer	
D-24	Unnamed	1966–1969	Relief fleet	
D-24	Unnamed	1969–1971	Bembridge	
D-24	Unnamed	1971–1974	Relief fleet	
D-24	Unnamed	1974–1981	Inshore Lifeboat Centre	
D-25	Unnamed	1964	Southwold	
D-25	Unnamed	1965	Hastings	
D-25	Unnamed	1966	Torbay	
D-25	Unnamed	1967	Pwllheli	
D-25	Unnamed	1968–1969	Wells-next-the-Sea	
D-25	Unnamed	1969–1972	Relief fleet	
D-26	Unnamed	1965	Walmer	
D-26	Unnamed	1966	Skegness	
D-26	Unnamed	1966–1967	St Ives	
D-26	Unnamed	1967–1968	Great Yarmouth and Gorleston	
D-26	Unnamed	1970–1971	Cromer	
D-26	Unnamed	1972–1981	Relief fleet	
D-12-P	Unnamed	1981–1985	Publicity	
D-27	Unnamed	1965–1967	Hastings	
D-28	Unnamed	1964	Barrow	
D-28	Unnamed	1965	Whitstable	
D-28	Unnamed	1965	Worthing	
D-28	Unnamed	1969–1970	Aberystwyth	
D-28	Unnamed	1970	Southend-on-Sea	
D-28	Unnamed	1972	Southend-on-Sea	
D-29	Unnamed	1965	Wells-next-the-Sea	
D-29	Unnamed	1966	Atlantic College	
D-30	Unnamed	1964	Eastbourne	
D-30	Unnamed	1965–1967	Aberystwyth	
D-30	Unnamed	1967	Porthcawl	
D-30	Unnamed	1968	St Agnes	
D-30	Unnamed	1969	Bournemouth	
D-31	Unnamed	1964–1965	Redcar	
D-32	Unnamed	1964	Great Yarmouth and Gorleston	
D-32	Unnamed	1965–1966	Eastbourne	
D-32	Unnamed	1966–1967	West Mersea	
D-33	Unnamed	1965–1966	Atlantic College	
D-33	Unnamed	1968	Torbay	
D-34	Unnamed	No service records		
D-35	Unnamed	1966	Southend-on-Sea	
D-36	Unnamed	1964	Largs	
D-36	Unnamed	1965	Worthing	
D-36	Unnamed	1965–1970	Southwold	
D-36	Unnamed	1970–1973	Relief fleet	
D-37	Unnamed	1964	North Sunderland	
D-37	Unnamed	1966	Yarmouth	
D-37	Unnamed	1966	Flint	
D-37	Unnamed	1966	Redcar	
D-37	Unnamed	1967	North Sunderland	
D-37	Unnamed	1968	Littlestone-on-Sea	
D-37	Unnamed	1968–1972	Relief fleet	
D-38	Unnamed	1965–1966	Atlantic College	
D-38	Unnamed	1966–1973	Relief fleet	
D-39	Unnamed	1965–1967	Brighton	
D-39	Unnamed	1966	St Agnes	
D-39	Unnamed	1968–1972	Relief fleet	
D-40	Unnamed	1965–1968	Bangor	
D-40	Unnamed	1968–1969	Scarborough	
D-40	Unnamed	1969–1970	Relief fleet	
D-41	Unnamed	1965–1969	Lymington	
D-41	Unnamed	1970–1973	Relief fleet	
D-42	Unnamed	1965–1967	Mudeford	
D-42	Unnamed	1967–1973	Relief fleet	
D-42	Unnamed	1973–1974	New Brighton	
D-42	Unnamed	1974–1977	Relief fleet	
D-43	Unnamed	1965–1972	Barrow	
D-43	Unnamed	1972–1974	Relief fleet	
D-12-P	Unnamed	1974–????	Publicity	
D-44	Unnamed	1965–1972	The Mumbles	
D-45	Unnamed	1965–1968	Whitstable	
D-45	Unnamed	1969–1970	Whitstable	
D-45	Unnamed	1970–1972	Relief fleet	
D-45	Unnamed	1973	Queensferry	
D-46	Unnamed	1965–1967	Largs	
D-46	Unnamed	1967–1969	Poole	
D-46	Unnamed	1970	Aberdovey	
D-47	Unnamed	1965–1967	Bournemouth	
D-47	Unnamed	1967–1968	Relief fleet	
D-47	Unnamed	1969–1970	Weston-super-Mare	
D-48	Unnamed	1965–1970	Eastney	
D-48	Unnamed	1970–1971	Relief fleet	
D-49	Unnamed	1965–1966	Tynemouth	
D-49	Unnamed	1966–1967	Torbay	
D-49	Unnamed	1968–1969	Whitstable	
D-49	Unnamed	1970–1972	Filey	
D-49	Unnamed	1972–1979	Relief fleet	
D-50	Unnamed	1965	Cullercoats	
D-50	Unnamed	1966–1968	Tynemouth	
D-50	Unnamed	1969	Relief fleet	
D-50	Unnamed	1970	Littlestone-on-Sea	
D-50	Unnamed	1970–1973	Relief fleet	
D-50	Unnamed	1973–1974	Sheerness	
D-51	Unnamed	1965	Blyth	
D-51	Unnamed	1966–1967	Amble	
D-51	Unnamed	1968	Relief fleet	
D-51	Unnamed	1969–1970	Amble	
D-6-P	Unnamed	1970–1984	Publicity	
D-52	Unnamed	1966–1970	Porthcawl	
D-52	Unnamed	1970–1973	Relief fleet	
D-53	Unnamed	1965	North Sunderland	
D-53	Unnamed	1966–1973	Blyth	
D-53	Unnamed	1973	Relief fleet	
D-11-P	Unnamed	1973–????	Publicity	
D-54	Unnamed	1965–1966	Llandudno	
D-54	Unnamed	1966–1969	Relief fleet	
D-54	Unnamed	1969	Moelfre	
D-54	Unnamed	1970–1972	Amble	
D-54	Unnamed	1972–1977	Relief fleet	
D-55	Unnamed	1965–1967	Newquay	
D-55	Unnamed	1967–1969	Torbay	
D-55	Unnamed	1969–1971	Relief fleet	
D-56	Unnamed	1964	Humber	
D-56	Unnamed	1965–1972	Humber Mouth	
D-56	Unnamed	1972–1977	Relief fleet	
D-57	Unnamed	1965–1970	Blackpool	
D-57	Unnamed	1970–1971	Relief fleet	
D-58	Unnamed	1965–1972	Skegness	
D-58	Unnamed	1972–1974	Relief fleet	
D-58	Unnamed	1974	Withernsea	
D-58	Unnamed	1974–1977	Relief fleet	
D-70	Unnamed	1965–1968	Abersoch	
D-70	Unnamed	1968–1970	Relief fleet	
D-71	Unnamed	1965–1970	Harwich	
D-71	Unnamed	1970–1972	Relief fleet	
D-71	Unnamed	1972	Coverack	
D-71	Unnamed	1972–1973	Relief fleet	
D-72	Unnamed	1965–1972	Happisburgh	
D-72	Unnamed	1972–1975	Relief fleet	
D-11-P	Unnamed	1975–????	Publicity	
D-73	Unnamed	1965–1967	Great Yarmouth and Gorleston	
D-73	Unnamed	1967–1969	Relief fleet	
D-73	Unnamed	1969–1973	Burnham-on-Crouch	
D-73	Unnamed	1973–1982	Relief fleet	
D-8-P	Unnamed	1982–1987	Publicity	
D-74	Unnamed	1965–1967	Tramore	
D-74	Unnamed	1968–1972	Weston-super-Mare	
D-74	Unnamed	1972–1978	Relief fleet	
D-75	Unnamed	1965–1967	Relief fleet	
D-75	Unnamed	1968–1969	Eastbourne	
D-75	Unnamed	1970–1977	Relief fleet	
D-76	Unnamed	1966	On Board 70-001 Clyde	
D-76	Unnamed	1966–1969	Relief fleet	
D-76	Unnamed	1969–1970	Mudeford	
D-76	Unnamed	1970–1971	Relief fleet	
D-81	Unnamed	1966–1972	Port St Mary	
D-81	Unnamed	1972–1973	Relief fleet	
D-81	Unnamed	1973–1974	Poole	
D-81	Unnamed	1974–1975	Relief fleet	
D-81	Unnamed	1975	Lytham St Annes	
D-81	Unnamed	1975–1983	Relief fleet	
D-81	Unnamed	1983–1985	Boarding Boat	
D-82	Unnamed	1966–1968	Wells-next-the-Sea	
D-82	Unnamed	1968–1971	Relief fleet	
D-83	Unnamed	1966–1968	Weston-super-Mare	
D-83	Unnamed	1968–1971	Relief fleet	
D-84	Unnamed	1966–1970	Whitby	
D-84	Unnamed	1970–1977	Relief fleet	
D-85	Unnamed	1966–1967	Scarborough	
D-85	Unnamed	1967–1975	Relief fleet	
D-7-P	Unnamed	1975–1978	Publicity	
D-86	Unnamed	1966–1968	Filey	
D-86	Unnamed	1969–1971	Relief fleet	
D-87	Unnamed	1966–1968	Cullercoats	
D-87	Unnamed	1968–1971	Relief fleet	
D-87	Unnamed	1971	Kippford	
D-87	Unnamed	1971–1978	Relief fleet	
D-88	Unnamed	1966–1971	Port Talbot	
D-88	Unnamed	1971–1977	Relief fleet	
D-89	Unnamed	1966–1972	Exmouth	
D-89	Unnamed	1972–1973	Relief fleet	
D-90	Unnamed	1966–1969	Littlestone-on-Sea	
D-90	Unnamed	1969–1976	Relief fleet	
D-91	Unnamed	1966–1970	Fleetwood	
D-91	Unnamed	1970–1971	Southend-on-Sea	
D-91	Unnamed	1971–1975	Relief fleet	
D-91	Unnamed	1975	On Board 70-001 Clyde	
D-91	Unnamed	1975–1976	Relief fleet	
D-92	Unnamed	1966–1970	Bridlington	
D-92	Unnamed	1970–1977	Relief fleet	
D-92	Unnamed	1977	On Board 70-002 Clyde	
D-92	Unnamed	1975	GLC Flood Relief fleet	
D-21-P	Unnamed	1978–1991	Publicity	
D-93	Unnamed	1966–1972	Morecambe	
D-93	Unnamed	1973–1975	Burnham-on-Crouch	
D-93	Unnamed	1975–1977	Relief fleet	
D-13-P	Unnamed	1977–1987	Publicity	
D-94	Unnamed	1966–1976	Sunderland	
D-95	Unnamed	1966–1968	Burnham-on-Crouch	
D-95	Unnamed	1969	Mablethorpe	
D-95	Unnamed	1970–1973	Relief fleet	
D-96	Unnamed	1966–1975	Bude	
D-96	Unnamed	1975–1979	Relief fleet	
D-97	Unnamed	1966–1971	Conwy	
D-97	Unnamed	1971–1975	Relief fleet	
D-98	Unnamed	1966–1969	Kippford	
D-98	Unnamed	1969–1971	Relief fleet	
D-99	Unnamed	1966–1975	Margate	
D-100	Unnamed	1966	West Kirby	
D-100	Unnamed	1968	Boulmer	
D-100	Unnamed	1969–1974	Cullercoats	
D-100	Unnamed	1974–1980	Relief fleet	

=== D-101 – D-199 ===
Op. No.	Name	In service	Station	Comments
D-101	Unnamed	1967–1969	Cromer	
D-101	Unnamed	1970–1971	Relief fleet	
D-101	Unnamed	1971–1975	Bembridge	
D-101	Unnamed	1976–1981	Relief fleet	
D-19-P	Unnamed	1981–1987	Publicity	
D-102	Unnamed	1966–1968	Moelfre	
D-102	Unnamed	1970	Torbay	
D-103	Unnamed	1966–1975	Borth	
D-104	Unnamed	1966–1976	Flint	
D-104	Unnamed	1976–1980	Relief fleet	
D-104	Unnamed	1980–1983	GLC Flood Relief fleet	
D-22-P	Unnamed	1984	Publicity	
D-105	Unnamed	1966–1975	Rye Harbour	
D-105	Unnamed	1976–1983	Relief fleet	
D-105	Unnamed	1983–1986	Boarding Boat	
D-106	Unnamed	1966–1974	Crimdon Dene	
D-107	Unnamed	1966–1978	Clacton-on-Sea	
D-107	Unnamed	1978–1980	Relief fleet	
D-108	Unnamed	1967–1973	West Mersea	
D-108	Unnamed	1973–1975	Relief fleet	
D-108	Unnamed	1975	Withernsea	
D-108	Unnamed	1975–1977	Relief fleet	
D-108	Unnamed	1977–1979	Howth	
D-109	Unnamed	1967–1976	Llandudno	
D-109	Unnamed	1976–1978	Relief fleet	
D-110	Unnamed	1967–1968	Newquay	
D-110	Unnamed	1969	On Board 70-002 Clyde	
D-110	Unnamed	1970	Aberdovey	
D-110	Unnamed	1970–1974	Relief fleet	
D-110	Unnamed	1974–1975	St Abbs	
D-110	Unnamed	1975–1980	Relief fleet	
D-110	Unnamed	1980–1983	GLC Flood Relief fleet	
D-110	Unnamed	1984–1986	Publicity	
D-111	Unnamed	1967–1976	Berwick-upon-Tweed	
D-111	Unnamed	1977	Aldeburgh	
D-111	Unnamed	1978–1980	Relief fleet	
D-112	Blue Peter III	1967–1972	North Berwick	On display since 1996 in the RNLI Heritage Collection at Chatham Historic Dockyard, Dec 2025
D-112	Blue Peter III	1973–1984	Relief fleet	On display since 1996 in the RNLI Heritage Collection at Chatham Historic Dockyard, Dec 2025
D-112	Blue Peter III	1984–	On Display	On display since 1996 in the RNLI Heritage Collection at Chatham Historic Dockyard, Dec 2025
D-113	Unnamed	1967–1968	Eastbourne	
D-113	Unnamed	1968–1969	Great Yarmouth and Gorleston	
D-113	Unnamed	1970–1976	Wells-next-the-Sea	
D-113	Unnamed	1976–1980	Relief fleet	
D-114	Unnamed	1967–1976	Mablethorpe	
D-114	Unnamed	1977	Whitby	
D-114	Unnamed	1978	Bridlington	
D-114	Unnamed	1979–1983	Relief fleet	
D-114	Unnamed	1983–1987	Boarding Boat	
D-115	Blue Peter I	1967–1972	Littlehampton	Now part of The Science Museum collection
D-115	Blue Peter I	1972–1975	Relief fleet	Now part of The Science Museum collection
D-116	Unnamed	1967–1976	Holyhead	
D-116	Unnamed	1976–1979	Relief fleet	
D-116	Unnamed	1979–1982	Blackpool	
D-116	Unnamed	1982–1983	Relief fleet	
D-116	Unnamed	1983–1987	Boarding Boat	
D-117	Unnamed	1967–1971	Criccieth	
D-117	Unnamed	1972–1981	Blackpool	
D-117	Unnamed	1981–1982	Relief fleet	
D-120	Unnamed	1967–1976	Lytham St Annes	
D-120	Unnamed	1977–1980	Relief fleet	
D-120	Unnamed	1980–1981	Penarth	
D-17-P	Unnamed	1981–1988	Publicity	
D-121	Unnamed	1967–1975	Stonehaven	
D-121	Unnamed	1975–1980	Relief fleet	
D-122	Unnamed	1967–1975	New Quay	
D-123	Unnamed	1967–1976	Kinghorn	
D-123	Unnamed	1976–1980	Relief fleet	
D-124	Unnamed	1967–1975	Little and Broad Haven	
D-124	Unnamed	1976–1982	Relief fleet	
D-18-P	Unnamed	1982–1988	Publicity	
D-125	Unnamed	1967–1969	Lyme Regis	
D-125	Unnamed	1969–1975	Relief fleet	
D-126	Unnamed	1967–1977	Trearddur Bay	
D-126	Unnamed	1978–1980	Relief fleet	
D-126	Unnamed	1980–1981	Hunstanton	
D-126	Unnamed	1981–1985	Relief fleet	
D-127	Blue Peter II	1967–1976	Beaumaris	
D-128	Unnamed	1967–1970	Southend-on-Sea	
D-8-P	Unnamed	1970–1976	Publicity	
D-129	Unnamed	1967–1977	Howth	
D-129	Unnamed	1978–1983	Relief fleet	
D-129	Unnamed	1983–1987	Boarding Boat	
D-130	Unnamed	1967–1968	Plymouth	
D-130	Unnamed	1969–1975	Craster	
D-131	Unnamed	1968–1970	Relief fleet	
D-131	Unnamed	1970–1977	On Board 70-001 Clyde	
D-131	Unnamed	1977–1980	Relief fleet	
D-131	Unnamed	1980–1983	GLC Flood Relief fleet	
D-28-P	Unnamed	1984	Publicity	
D-132	Unnamed	1968–1971	Helensburgh	
D-132	Unnamed	1971–1974	Relief fleet	
D-132	Unnamed	1974	Stranraer	
D-132	Unnamed	1974–1987	Relief fleet	
D-133	Unnamed	1967–1968	Yarmouth	
D-133	Unnamed	1968	Relief fleet	
D-133	Unnamed	1969–1974	Moelfre	
D-133	Unnamed	1975	Relief fleet	
D-134	Unnamed	1968–1979	Tighnabruaich	
D-134	Unnamed	1979–1983	Relief fleet	
D-26-P	Unnamed	1984–1986	Publicity	
D-135	Unnamed	1967–1970	Walmer	
D-135	Unnamed	1970–1972	Relief fleet	
D-135	Unnamed	1972–1977	Kippford	
D-135	Unnamed	1977–1978	Relief fleet	
D-136	Unnamed	1967–1978	Redcar	
D-136	Unnamed	1978–1982	GLC Flood Relief fleet	
D-137	Unnamed	1967–1978	Barmouth	
D-137	Unnamed	1978	Relief fleet	
D-137	Unnamed	1978–1983	GLC Flood Relief fleet	
D-137	Unnamed	1983–1986	Boarding Boat	
D-138	Unnamed	1967	Aberdovey	
D-138	Unnamed	1968–1970	Relief fleet	
D-138	Unnamed	1970–1980	Selsey	
D-138	Unnamed	1980–1981	Relief fleet	
D-139	Unnamed	1967–1977	Port Isaac	
D-139	Unnamed	1978–1983	GLC Flood Relief fleet	
D-25-P	Unnamed	1983–1988	Publicity	
D-140	Unnamed	1967–1968	Aberystwyth	
D-140	Unnamed	1969	Aberdovey	
D-140	Unnamed	1969–1971	Relief fleet	
D-140	Unnamed	1971–1974	Aberdovey	
D-140	Unnamed	1974–1980	Criccieth	
D-140	Unnamed	1980–1984	Relief fleet	
D-140	Unnamed	1984–1987	Inshore Lifeboat Centre	
D-140	Unnamed	1987–1989	Training fleet	
D-141	Unnamed	1967–1975	Rhyl	
D-14-P	Unnamed	1975–????	Publicity	
D-142	Unnamed	1966–1977	St Ives	
D-142	Unnamed	1978	Relief fleet	
D-142	Unnamed	1978–1983	GLC Flood Relief fleet	
D-25-P	Unnamed	1983–????	Publicity	
D-143	Unnamed	1967–1975	Hastings	
D-143	Unnamed	1975–1978	Relief fleet	
D-143	Unnamed	1978–1988	Boarding Boat	
D-144	Unnamed	1967–1968	Bembridge	
D-144	Unnamed	1969–1970	Tynemouth	
D-144	Unnamed	1970–1975	Silloth	
D-144	Unnamed	1975–1977	Relief fleet	
D-144	Unnamed	1977–1980	Moelfre	
D-144	Unnamed	1980–1982	Relief fleet	
D-144	Unnamed	1982–1984	Amble	
D-145	Unnamed	1967–1971	Queensferry	
D-145	Unnamed	1972–1976	Sheerness	
D-145	Unnamed	1977–1980	Relief fleet	
D-145	Unnamed	1980	On Board 70-001 Clyde	
D-146	Unnamed	1967–1969	Silloth	
D-146	Unnamed	1970–1975	Southend-on-Sea	
D-147	Unnamed	1967–1970	Shoreham Harbour	
D-147	Unnamed	1970–1973	Relief fleet	
D-148	Blue Peter IV	1968–1972	St Agnes	1980–1987, On Display, Bristol Lifeboat Museum
D-148	Blue Peter IV	1972–1980	Relief fleet	1980–1987, On Display, Bristol Lifeboat Museum
D-149	Unnamed	1967–1970	Relief fleet	
D-149	Unnamed	1970–1971	On Board 70-001 Clyde	
D-149	Unnamed	1971–1974	Relief fleet	
D-150	Unnamed	1967–1968	Broughty Ferry	
D-150	Unnamed	1969–1971	Relief fleet	
D-150	Unnamed	1971–1972	Channel Light Vessel No.6	
D-150	Unnamed	1972–1975	Relief fleet	
D-150	Unnamed	1975–1976	Southend-on-Sea	
D-16-P	Unnamed	1976–1988	Publicity	
D-151	Unnamed	1967–1973	Largs	
D-152	Unnamed	1968–1972	Bournemouth	
D-152	Unnamed	1973	Hartlepool	
D-152	Unnamed	1974	Bude	
D-152	Unnamed	1975–1983	Boarding Boat	
D-153	Unnamed	1968–1978	Pwllheli	
D-153	Unnamed	1978–1983	Relief fleet	
D-154	Unnamed	1967–1971	Relief fleet	
D-155	Unnamed	1967–1975	West Kirby	
D-156	Unnamed	1967–1968	Mudeford	
D-156	Unnamed	1968–1969	Aberystwyth	
D-156	Unnamed	1969–1970	Lyme Regis	
D-156	Unnamed	1970–1971	Relief fleet	
D-156	Unnamed	1971	Blackpool	
D-156	Unnamed	1971–1982	Relief fleet	
D-157	Unnamed	1968–1980	North Sunderland	
D-157	Unnamed	1980–1984	Relief fleet	
D-10-P	Unnamed	1985–1990	Publicity	
D-158	Unnamed	1968	Brighton	
D-158	Unnamed	1969–1975	Southend-on-Sea	
D-159	Unnamed	1968	Eastbourne	
D-159	Unnamed	1969	St Ives	
D-159	Unnamed	1970–1978	Eastbourne	
D-159	Unnamed	1978–1984	Relief fleet	
D-160	Unnamed	1967–1971	Relief fleet	
D-161	Unnamed	1968–1969	Aberdovey	
D-161	Unnamed	1969–1975	Yarmouth	
D-15-P	Unnamed	1975–1984	Publicity	
D-162	Unnamed	1968–1969	Bangor	
D-162	Unnamed	1970–1978	Shoreham Harbour	
D-162	Unnamed	1979–1983	Relief fleet	
D-27-P	Unnamed	1983–1993	Publicity	
D-163	Unnamed	1968–1978	Tramore	
D-164	Unnamed	1968–1970	Selsey	
D-164	Unnamed	1970–1972	Relief fleet	
D-9-P	Unnamed	1972–????	Publicity	
D-165	Unnamed	1968–1980	Horton and Port Eynon	
D-165	Unnamed	1980–1984	Relief fleet	
D-165T	Unnamed	1984–1991	Training fleet	
D-166	Unnamed	1967–1972	Hartlepool	
D-166	Unnamed	1972–1978	Coverack	
D-166	Unnamed	1979–1985	Relief fleet	
D-166	Unnamed	1985	Boarding Boat	
D-167	Unnamed	1969–1979	St Catherine	
D-167	Unnamed	1980–1981	Relief fleet	
D-167	Unnamed	1981–1982	Blackpool	
D-20-P	Unnamed	1982–1990	Publicity	
D-168	Unnamed	1968–1981	Aberdeen	
D-168	Unnamed	1981–1985	Relief fleet	
D-168	Unnamed	1985–1987	Boarding Boat	
D-169	Unnamed	1968–1983	Dunbar	
D-169	Unnamed	1983–1985	Relief fleet	
D-169	Unnamed	1985–1989	Boarding Boat	
D-170	Unnamed	1969–1972	Arbroath	
D-170	Unnamed	1973–1981	Weston-super-Mare	
D-170	Unnamed	1981–1984	Relief fleet	
D-170	Unnamed	1984	St Agnes	
D-170T	Unnamed	1985–1988	Training fleet	
D-171	Unnamed	1969–1979	Newquay	
D-172	Unnamed	1968–1969	Yarmouth	
D-172	Unnamed	1969	Newquay	
D-172	Unnamed	1970–1981	Tynemouth	
D-172	Unnamed	1981–1983	Relief fleet	
D-172T	Unnamed	1983–????	Training fleet	
D-173	Unnamed	1968–1983	Broughty Ferry	
D-173	Unnamed	1984–1986	Relief fleet	
D-173	Unnamed	1986–1988	Boarding Boat	
D-174	Unnamed	1970–1983	Porthcawl	
D-174	Unnamed	1983–1987	Relief fleet	
D-174	Unnamed	1987–1991	Boarding Boat	
D-175	Alan Thurlow Ashford	1970–1983	Bangor	
D-175	Unnamed	1983–1986	Relief fleet	
D-175	Unnamed	1986–1988	Boarding Boat	
D-176	Unnamed	1971–1972	Queensferry	
D-176	Unnamed	1972–1981	Relief fleet	
D-176	Unnamed	1982	Skerries	
D-176	Unnamed	1982–1986	Relief fleet	
D-176	Unnamed	1986–1991	Boarding Boat	
D-177	Unnamed	1970–1983	Minehead	
D-177	Unnamed	1983–1987	Relief fleet	
D-178	Unnamed	1970–1974	Brighton	
D-178	Unnamed	1974–1978	Relief fleet	
D-178	Unnamed	1978–1979	Aldeburgh	
D-178	Unnamed	1979–1982	Relief fleet	
D-178	Unnamed	1982–1983	Blackpool	
D-178	Unnamed	1983–1987	Relief fleet	
D-3-P	Unnamed	1987–1991	Publicity	
D-179	Unnamed	1970–1977	Great Yarmouth and Gorleston	
D-179	Unnamed	1978–1979	Tramore	
D-179	Unnamed	1979–1981	Relief fleet	
D-179	Blue Peter IV	1981–1984	St Agnes	
D-180	Unnamed	1970–1985	St Bees	
D-180	Unnamed	1985–1986	Relief fleet	
D-180	Unnamed	1986	Poole	
D-180	Unnamed	1986–1988	Boarding Boat	
D-181	Unnamed	1970–1973	Lymington	
D-181	Unnamed	1973–1979	Relief fleet	
D-181	Unnamed	1979	Hunstanton	
D-181	Unnamed	1979–1985	Relief fleet	
D-181	Unnamed	1986–1987	Boarding Boat	
D-182	Unnamed	1970–1974	Whitstable	
D-182	Unnamed	1974	Relief fleet	
D-182	Unnamed	1975–1984	Margate	
D-182	Unnamed	1984–1987	Relief fleet	
D-182	Unnamed	1987	Cleethorpes	
D-182	Unnamed	1987	Relief fleet	
D-183	The Young People of Scarborough	1970–1984	Scarborough	
D-183	The Young People of Scarborough	1984–1986	Relief fleet	
D-183	The Young People of Scarborough	1986–1990	Trials	
D-184	Unnamed	1970–1983	Eastney	
D-184	Unnamed	1984–1988	Relief fleet	
D-184	Unnamed	1988–1989	Boarding Boat	
D-185	Unnamed	1970	Arran	
D-185	Unnamed	1970–1971	Largs	
D-185	Unnamed	1971–1984	Arran	
D-185	Unnamed	1984–1987	Relief fleet	
D-186	Unnamed	1970–1983	Aberystwyth	
D-186	Unnamed	1983–1986	Relief fleet	
D-2-P	Unnamed	1987–1989	Publicity	
D-187	Unnamed	1970–1984	Fleetwood	
D-187	Unnamed	1983–1988	Relief fleet	
D-8-P	Unnamed	1988–1993	Publicity	
D-188	The Lord Feoffees	1971–1983	Bridlington	
D-188	Unnamed	1984–1987	Relief fleet	
D-189	Unnamed	1970–1972	Littlestone-on-Sea	
D-189	Unnamed	1972–1983	Port Talbot	
D-189	Unnamed	1984–1987	Relief fleet	
D-9-P	Unnamed	1988	Publicity	
D-190	Unnamed	1970–1980	Mudeford	
D-190	Unnamed	1981–1986	Relief fleet	
D-190	Unnamed	1987–1988	Poole	
D-191	Unnamed	1971–1973	Southwold	
D-191	Unnamed	1973–1988	Relief fleet	
D-191	Unnamed	1988	Boarding Boat	
D-192	Unnamed	1971–1977	Abersoch	
D-192	Unnamed	1978	Relief fleet	
D-192	Unnamed	1979–1980	Newquay	
D-192	Unnamed	1980–1982	Relief fleet	
D-192	Unnamed	1982–1984	Blackpool	
D-192	Unnamed	1985–1987	Relief fleet	
D-193	Unnamed	1971–1977	Whitby	
D-194	Unnamed	1971–1977	Cardigan	
D-195	Unnamed	Sold to Spain in 1971		
D-196	Unnamed	1972–1987	Red Bay	
D-196	Unnamed	1987	Relief fleet	
D-196	Unnamed	1987–1991	Boarding Boat	
D-197	Unnamed	1972–1984	Cromer	
D-197	Unnamed	1984–1987	Relief fleet	
D-197	Unnamed	1987–1988	Boarding Boat	
D-198	Unnamed	1972–1986	Barrow	
D-198	Unnamed	1986–1987	Relief fleet	
D-198	Unnamed	1988–1990	Boarding Boat	
D-199	Unnamed	1972–1986	Mumbles	
D-199	Unnamed	1986–1988	Relief fleet	

=== D-202 – D-310 ===
Op. No.	Name	In service	Station	Comments
D-202	Unnamed	1972–1986	Filey	
D-202	Unnamed	1986–1987	Relief fleet	
D-202	Unnamed	1987–1991	Boarding Boat	
D-203	Unnamed	1972–1973	Amble	
D-203	Unnamed	1974	Port St Mary	
D-203	Unnamed	1975–1981	Amble	
D-203	Unnamed	1981–1984	Relief fleet	
D-203	Unnamed	1984–1989	Boarding Boat	
D-204	Unnamed	1975–1985	Tenby	
D-204	Unnamed	1986	Sheringham	
D-204	Unnamed	1986–1988	Relief fleet	
D-208	Unnamed	1973–1985	Morecambe	
D-208	Unnamed	1987	Cleethorpes	
D-208	Unnamed	1987	Relief fleet	
D-208	Unnamed	1987–1989	Boarding Boat	
D-209	Unnamed	1973	Port St Mary	
D-209	Unnamed	1974	Amble	
D-209	Unnamed	1975–1976	Port St Mary	
D-209	Unnamed	1976	Relief fleet	
D-209	Unnamed	1977–1986	Port St Mary	
D-209	Unnamed	1986–1988	Relief fleet	
D-209	Unnamed	1988–1989	Boarding Boat	
D-210	Unnamed	1973–1986	Blyth	
D-210	Unnamed	1987–1988	Relief fleet	
D-210	Unnamed	1988–1989	Boarding Boat	
D-211	Unnamed	1973–1979	Humber Mouth	
D-211	Unnamed	1980–1987	Relief fleet	
D-211	Unnamed	1987–1990	Boarding Boat	
D-212	Unnamed	1973–1987	Skegness	
D-212	Unnamed	1987–1988	Relief fleet	
D-213	Unnamed	1973–1987	Happisburgh	
D-213	Unnamed	1987–1988	Relief fleet	
D-215	Blue Peter IV	1973–1981	St Agnes	
D-216	Blue Peter III	1973–1985	North Berwick	
D-216	Unnamed	1985–1986	Dún Laoghaire	
D-216	Unnamed	1986–1988	Relief fleet	
D-216	Unnamed	1988–1989	Boarding Boat	
D-216T	Unnamed	1989–????	Training fleet	
D-217	Unnamed	1972–1977	Relief fleet	
D-217	Unnamed	1977–1987	Sunderland	
D-217	Unnamed	1987–1988	Relief fleet	
D-217	Unnamed	1989–1992	Boarding Boat	
D-218	Unnamed	1972–1976	Relief fleet	
D-218	Unnamed	1976–1986	On Board 70-003 Clyde	
D-219	Unnamed	1973–1986	Arbroath	
D-219	Unnamed	1986–1988	Relief fleet	
D-220	Unnamed	1973–1986	Burry Port	
D-220	Unnamed	1986–1989	Relief fleet	
D-220	Unnamed	1989	Boarding Boat	
D-264	Unnamed	1979–1987	Shoreham Harbour	
D-264	Unnamed	1987–1989	Relief fleet	
D-264T	Unnamed	1989–????	Training fleet	
D-265	Unnamed	1979–1988	Pwllheli	
D-265	Unnamed	1988–1990	Relief fleet	
D-265	Unnamed	1990–????	Boarding Boat	
D-266	Unnamed	1978–1986	Eastbourne	
D-266	Unnamed	1986–1990	Relief fleet	
D-266	Unnamed	1990–1993	Boarding Boat	
D-267	Unnamed	1979–1988	Redcar	
D-267	Unnamed	1989	Relief fleet	
D-267	Unnamed	1989–1991	Boarding Boat	
D-268	Unnamed	1979–1988	Barmouth	
D-268	Unnamed	1989–1990	Relief fleet	
D-269	Unnamed	1980–1988	Tramore	
D-269	Unnamed	1988–1990	Relief fleet	
D-269	Unnamed	1990–????	Boarding Boat	
D-273	Unnamed	1980–1988	Howth	
D-273	Unnamed	1989–1992	Boarding Boat	
D-274	Unnamed	1980–1984	St Catherine	
D-274	Unnamed	1984–1989	Relief fleet	
D-274	Unnamed	1989–1990	Boarding Boat	
D-275	Unnamed	1980–1988	Horton and Port Eynon	
D-275	Unnamed	1988–1990	Relief fleet	
D-275	Unnamed	1991–1996	Boarding Boat	
D-276	Gillian Powell	1980–1988	Moelfre	
D-276	Gillian Powell	1988–1991	Relief fleet	
D-276	Gillian Powell	1991–1996	Boarding Boat	
D-277	Sea Lion	1981–1989	Selsey	
D-277	Sea Lion	1989–1991	Relief fleet	
D-277	Sea Lion	1991–????	Boarding Boat	
D-286	Unnamed	1982–1986	Relief fleet	
D-286	Unnamed	1987	Torbay	
D-286	Unnamed	1988–1990	Relief fleet	
D-286	Unnamed	1990–1991	Boarding Boat	
D-291	Donald Rigby Middleton	1983–1989	Porthcawl	
D-291	Donald Rigby Middleton	1989–1992	Relief fleet	
D-291	Donald Rigby Middleton	1992–1994	Boarding Boat	
D-292	Castle House	1983–1989	Dunbar	
D-292	Castle House	1989–1990	Relief fleet	
D-292	Castle House	1990–1991	Marazion	
D-292	Castle House	1991–1992	Relief fleet	
D-292	Castle House	1992–1996	Boarding Boat	
D-292T	Castle House	1996–	Training fleet	
D-293	Unnamed	1983–1989	Broughty Ferry	
D-293	Unnamed	1989–1992	Relief fleet	
D-28-P	Unnamed	1992–????	Publicity	
D-294	Bill Mellis	1983–1989	Margate	
D-294	Bill Mellis	1990–1991	Relief fleet	
D-295	Unnamed	1983–1992	Minehead	
D-295	Unnamed	1992–2002	Boarding Boat	
D-296	Unnamed	1984–1992	Portsmouth (Langstone Harbour)	
D-296	Unnamed	1992–1996	Boarding Boat	
D-296T	Unnamed	1996–2001	Training fleet	
D-297	Unnamed	1984–1990	Port Talbot	
D-297	Unnamed	1990–1992	Relief fleet	
D-297	Unnamed	1992–1994	Boarding Boat	
D-298	Unnamed	1984–1992	Fleetwood	
D-298	Unnamed	1992–2001	Boarding Boat	
D-299	The Lord Feoffees	1984–1992	Bridlington	
D-299T	Unnamed	1992–1995	Training fleet	
D-300	Lodge of Peace No.322	1983–1992	Blackpool	
D-300	Lodge of Peace No.322	1992–2001	Boarding Boat	
D-301	Alan Thurlow Ashford	1983–1988	Bangor	
D-301	Alan Thurlow Ashford	1988–1993	Relief fleet	
D-301	Alan Thurlow Ashford	1993–1995	Boarding Boat	
D-301T	Alan Thurlow Ashford	1995–1997	Training fleet	
D-302	Unnamed	1983–1992	Clacton-on-Sea	
D-302	Unnamed	1992–1993	Relief fleet	
D-302	Unnamed	1993–1997	Boarding Boat	
D-303	Unnamed	1984–1987	Arran	
D-303	Unnamed	1987–1991	Relief fleet	
D-304	Unnamed	1984–1992	Scarborough	
D-304	Unnamed	1993–2001	Boarding Boat	
D-305	Blue Peter IV	1985–1993	St Agnes	
D-306	Blue Peter III	1985–1994	North Berwick	
D-306	Unnamed	1994–2001	Boarding Boat	
D-306	Unnamed	2001–2007	Relief fleet	
D-307	Spirit of Round Table	1984–1992	Cromer	
D-307T	Spirit of Round Table	1992–1997	Training fleet	
D-308	Unnamed	1984–1986	Relief fleet	
D-308	Unnamed	1986–1992	Kilkeel	
D-308	Unnamed	1992–1997	Boarding Boat	
D-309	Unnamed	1984–1994	Relief fleet	
D-309	Unnamed	1994–????	Boarding Boat	
D-310	Unnamed	1984–1993	Blackpool	
D-310	Unnamed	1994–1996	Boarding Boat	
