= Brandy Hole =

Coordinates: 51.628°N 00.647°E

- Location within Essex
- OS grid reference: TQ8295
- Shire county: Essex
- Region: East
- Country: England
- Sovereign state: United Kingdom
- Police: Essex
- Fire: Essex
- Ambulance: East of England

Brandy Hole is the name of a large area of saltmarsh and saltings on the River Crouch in Rochford District in the County of Essex, England. It is located on the south bank of the Crouch between Brandy Hole and Stow Creek. It has an area of about 130 hectares, about 320 acres (1.3 km^{2}) and it is mostly in Hullbridge Parish (previously in Hockley Parish). A small part of it is in Ashingdon Parish. In past centuries, it had been used for producing marine salt and for the cultivation of shellfish, mainly Colchester native oysters (Ostrea edulis) which were abundant in the area. It is part of the Crouch and Roach Estuary SSSI and it is an extensive spawning area and habitat for a large variety of fish species including Bass, Cod, Whiting and many flatfish. It is a habitat and feeding ground for a large variety of marine birds and it is also frequently visited by seals.

For centuries until the 1800s and early 1900s, it was also an area known for the smuggling of contraband goods, mainly wine, brandy and even tea, hence the name "Brandy Hole".

Beside the Brandy Hole saltings there are two yachting centres with boatyards, slipways, moorings and a yacht club. Nearby, there are caravan parks and a residential area or hamlet known as "Brandy Hole" even though it is within the parish boundaries of the large village of Hullbridge.
