= Foreland =

Foreland may refer to:

- a landform projecting into the sea, such as a headland or a promontory
- an area of land in front of something
  - Foreland basin, in geology, the zone that receives sediment from an adjacent mountain chain
  - Glacier foreland, the area between the leading edge of a glacier and the moraines of the last maximum

== Places ==
- Foreland, Isle of Wight, a promontory on the Isle of Wight in England
- Foreland Island in the South Shetland Islands, Antarctica
- Foreland Point, a headland in Devon, England
- Alpine Foreland, a region in Southern Germany
- North and South Foreland, two headlands on the coast of Kent, England

== See also ==
- Nils Tore Føreland (born 1957), Norwegian politician
