= Bembridge Lifeboat Station =

RNLI lifeboat station on Isle of Wight, England

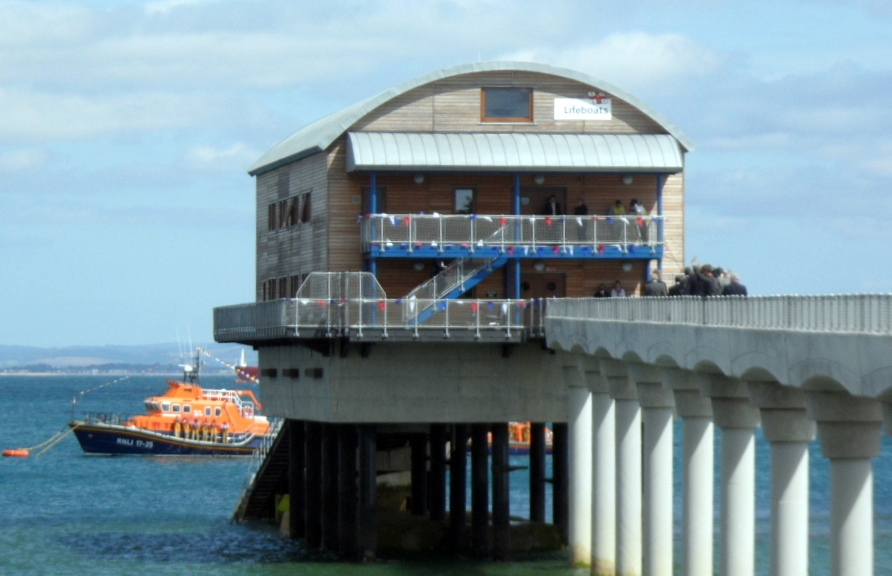
- Bembridge Lifeboat Station

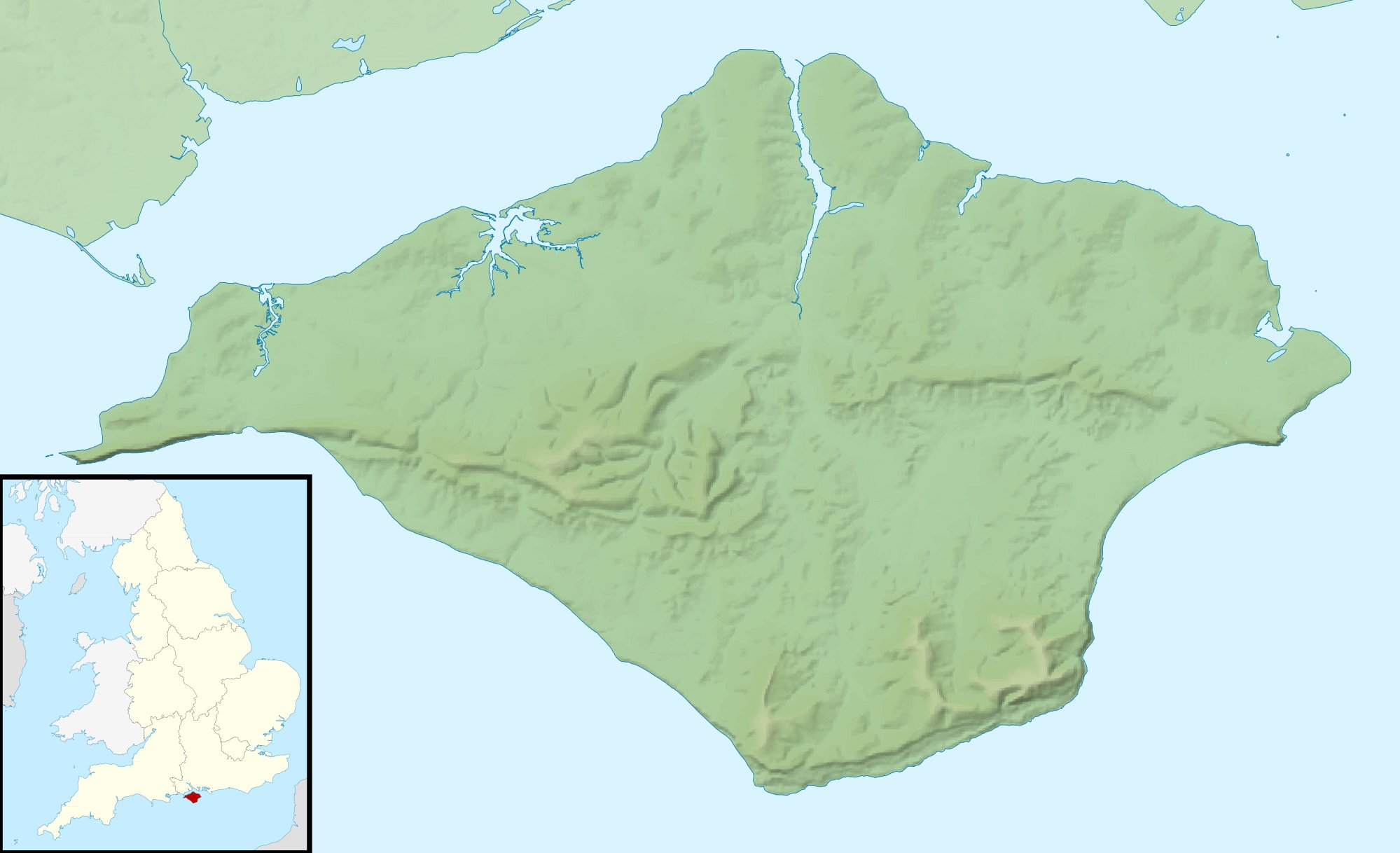
- Location within Isle of Wight

General information
- Type: RNLI Lifeboat Station
- Architectural style: Boathouse built on piles
- Location: Lane End, Bembridge, Isle of Wight, PO35 5TD, England
- Coordinates: 50°41′24.7″N 1°04′13.7″W
- Opened: 1867
- Owner: Royal National Lifeboat Institution

Technical details
- Material: Concrete and Steel

Website
- Bembridge RNLI Lifeboat Station

Bembridge Lifeboat Station is located in the village of Bembridge on the Isle of Wight in the United Kingdom. The station is located on the eastern approaches to The Solent, south of the area known as Spithead. The station is on one of the busiest shipping lanes in United Kingdom waters.

A lifeboat was first stationed at Bembridge in 1867 by the Royal National Lifeboat Institution (RNLI).

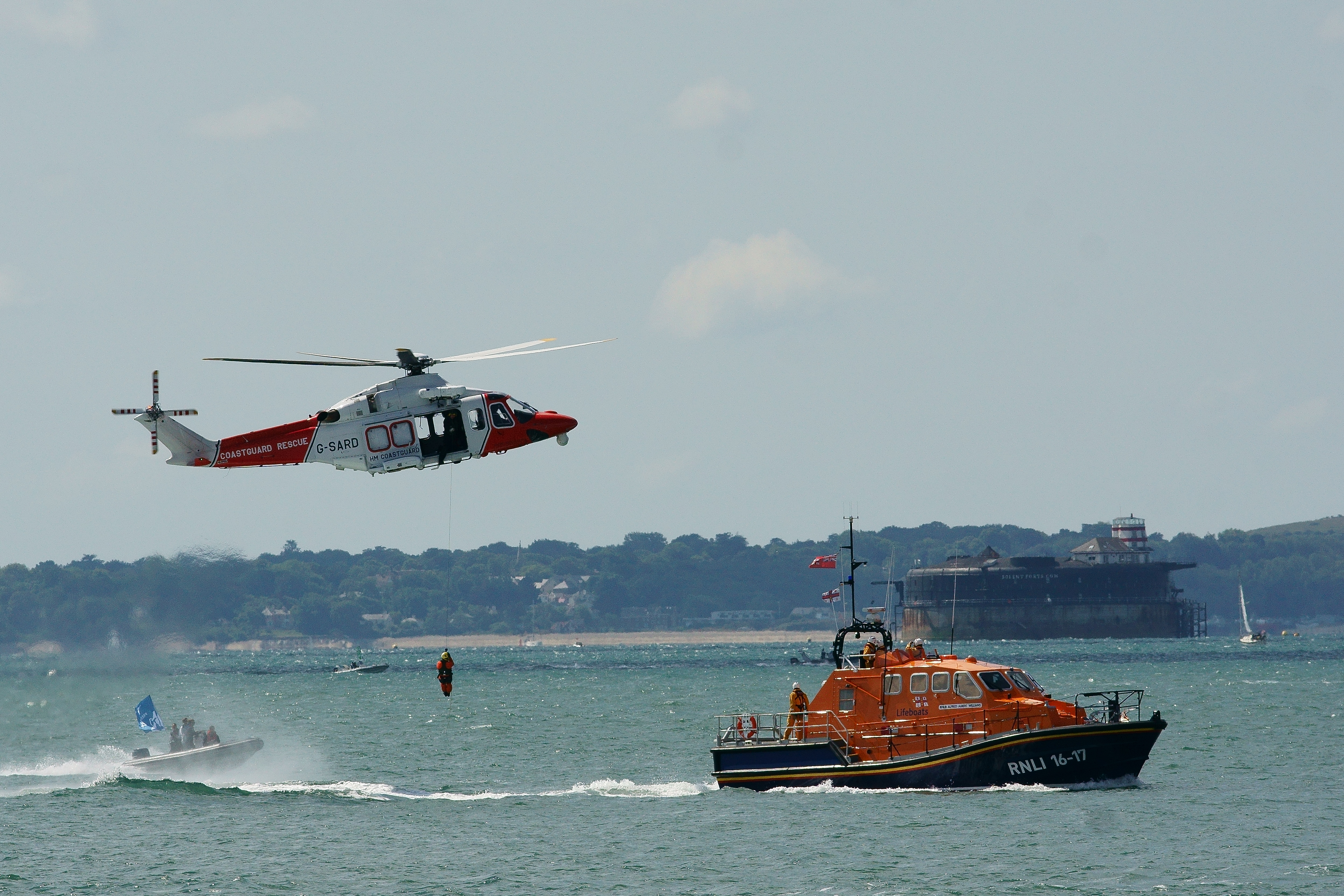
Tamar-class All-weather lifeboat, 16-17 Alfred Albert Williams (ON 1297) on display

The station currently operates a Tamar-class All-weather lifeboat (ALB), 16-17 Alfred Albert Williams (ON 1297), on station since 2010, and a D-class (IB1) Inshore lifeboat (ILB), Sue (D-912), on station since 2026. The ALB is housed in the main boathouse on a piled platform with slipway, linked to the shore by a pier gangway, with the ILB kept in a boathouse on the shore.

== History ==
=== 1867–1922: original service and rescues ===
The first lifeboat service began at Bembridge in 1867. A boathouse was built at Lane End at a cost of £165, and the first lifeboat was launched from here by means of a carriage. The first lifeboat on station was a self-righting 'pulling and sailing' (P&S) lifeboat, one with oars and sails, and was 32 ft 0 in (9.75 m) long and 7 ft 6 in (2.29 m) in beam. She was paid for by the subscriptions of the citizens of Worcester and was named City of Worcester.

The lifeboat Queen Victoria (ON 112), was placed at Bembridge from 1887 to 1902. In 1902, she was replaced by another lifeboat to be named Queen Victoria (ON 468). The first boathouse was enlarged between 1902 and 1903.

On 3 February 1916 the SS Empress Queen became stranded in thick fog and foul weather on the Ring Rocks, off the Foreland at the eastern extremity of the Isle of Wight. There were 1,300 troops and a large quantity of ammunition on board. A destroyer was used to take off the troops while the crew remained on board. Efforts to pull the Empress Queen off the rocks failed, and within a few hours a gale had blown up. The Queen Victoria (ON 468) was launched to assist but was unable to anchor nearby. A line thrown from the Empress Queen was finally retrieved, allowing the lifeboat to be pulled alongside. Over four trips, the Queen Victoria rescued 110 crewmen, along with the ship's cat and dog. Coxswain John Holbrook would be awarded the RNLI Silver Medal.

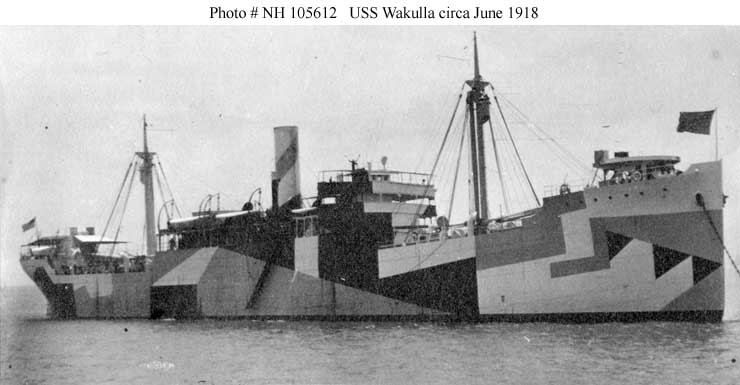
USS Wakulla, whose crew was rescued by the Bembridge lifeboat

On the morning of 28 August 1919, there was heavy rain in a strong gale, and an American ship called the USS Wakulla (ID-3147) had been driven onto a shoal at West Wittering. The Queen Victoria (ON 468) was towed out by a government tug until she was windward of the steamer. Finally getting alongside, the lifeboat rescued 13 of her crew, landing them on shore. The lifeboat then returned to stand by, until the weather moderated. The lifeboat had been at sea for 19 hours. Coxswain John Holbrook was awarded his second RNLI Silver Medal.

=== 1922–1939: improvements ===
By 1922 the RNLI had determined that Bembridge's location made it a prime candidate for a new motor lifeboat, requiring the construction of a new boathouse with a concrete pier and a steel launching slipway. A single-screw self-righting motor lifeboat, the Langham (ON 676), was funded by a legacy and was named and launched by a member of the donor's family. The 1922 improvements made Bembridge the most state-of-the-art station in the country and gave the crew the capability to be at sea in just 14 minutes. The new motor lifeboat extended the range of the station, allowing Bembridge to cover Brooke and Brighstone Grange, whose stations were closed.

In 1939, the boathouse was enlarged to accommodate a new 46-foot Watson-class twin-screw motor lifeboat, the Jesse Lumb (ON 822). She was funded by a legacy and christened by the Bishop of Salisbury, Neville Lovett, on 21 July 1939.

On 29 January 1940 there was a blizzard with heavy seas in the English Channel. The Jesse Lumb put out to sea at 5:20 pm in response to a distress call. She searched Man's Fort just off Selsey, then was redirected to search between Ryde and Seaview on the Isle of Wight. Finding no vessels in distress, she was redirected to Chichester Bar outside Chichester Harbour, where she finally located HMT Kingston Cairngorm, which was flooding quickly. After several approaches, the Jesse Lumb retrieved all 21 of her crew safely. Coxswain Harry James Gawn was awarded the RNLI Bronze Medal.

The Bembridge lifeboats continued to serve during World War II. On 8 August 1941, Jesse Lumb was launched to search for an aircraft reported to be down 10 miles (16 km) south of Bembridge station. After a fruitless search for the aircraft, the lifeboat came across Royal Air Force Marine Branch high speed launch HSL 116, disabled and flying a distress signal. She had been attacked by German aircraft while on patrol. One crewman had been killed, another severely wounded, and her propeller was fouled. The Jesse Lumb took the vessel under tow and brought her safely in to Portsmouth.

=== 1964 onwards ===
In 1964 the RNLI established an Inshore lifeboat service at Bembridge, utilising the 1867 boathouse to house the D-class ILB. In 1970, Jesse Lumb was withdrawn to the relief fleet. The main boathouse was enlarged to accommodate a new lifeboat, the Solent-class Jack Shayler and the Lees (ON 1009) which served on station from 1970 until 1978.

In 1987 the station was allocated a new Tyne-class lifeboat, Max Aitken III (ON 1126), and the boathouse was again altered to accommodate the bigger boat. She was on the station from 1987 until 2010. In 1989 work was done on the slipway to extend the toe, and in 1994 major repairs were made to the slipway.

Bembridge Inshore lifeboat station and shop

In 2009 a new Tamar-class lifeboat was allocated to the station, again requiring a major redevelopment of the offshore boathouse, projected to cost £10 million. A public appeal to raise £1million for the project was launched. Demolition of the old station began in May 2009.

The Tyne-class Max Aitken III was withdrawn to the RNLI relief fleet, and the station was temporarily allocated the shore-launched Mersey-class lifeboat Peggy & Alex Caird (ON 1124), to cover whilst the new station was built.

The facility was designed to allow the lifeboat to reach 95% of casualties up to 50 miles (80 km) from the station, within 30 minutes of launch. The new boathouse, station and gangway were completed by October 2010, at a cost of £7,650,000. On 27 September 2010, a new Tamar-class lifeboat, Alfred Albert Williams (ON 1297), was deployed to the station.

At the same time, work was carried out on the old onshore boathouse, to provide new facilities for the Inshore lifeboat. The portion of the structure dating back to the original 19th century boathouse were kept, whilst the newer building was carefully constructed around it.

At a ceremony held on a warm sunny Saturday, 1 August 2026, a new D-class (IB1) Inshore lifeboat was handed to the care of Bembridge RNLI by Nigel Hartley, MBE, High Sheriff of the Isle of Wight. The new boat, which replaces Norman Harvey (D-778), was funded by the Michael Cornish Charitable Trust, which was established in 2005, allowing both Sue and Michael Cornish to support various charities. After a service of dedication led by the Rev. Steve Daugherty, the lifeboat was named Sue (D-912).

== Station honours ==
The following are awards made at Bembridge:

- RNLI Silver Medal
  John Holbrook, Coxswain – 1916
  John Holbrook, Coxswain – 1919 (Second-Service clasp)
- RNLI Bronze Medal
  Harry James Gawn, Coxswain – 1940
- 'The Thanks of the Institution inscribed on Vellum'
  Charles Searle, Coxswain – 1877
  Alan Attrill, Helm – 1994
- 'A Framed Letter of Thanks signed by the Chairman of the Institution'
  Archibald Henley, Coxswain – 1993
  Alan Attrill, Helm – 1994
  Graeme White, crew member – 1994
  Geoffrey Attrill, crew member – 1994
- 'A Framed Letter of Appreciation'
  Martin S. Humphrey, inshore lifeboat crew member – 1970
  Barry L. Dyer, inshore lifeboat crew member – 1970
- Member, Order of the British Empire (MBE)
  Martin John Woodward, Former Coxswain – 2004NYH
  Capt Graham Hall, Lifeboat Operations Manager – 2011QBH
- British Empire Medal
  Peter Smith, Coxswain – 1972NYH

== Bembridge lifeboats ==
=== Pulling and Sailing (P&S) lifeboats ===
On station	ON (Note: ON is the RNLI's Official Number of the boat.)	Name	Built	Class	Comments
1867–1887	Pre-500	City of Worcester	1867	32-foot Prowse self-righting (P&S)	(Note: 32 ft 0 in (9.75 m) x 7 ft 7 in (2.31 m) (10-oared) Prowse-class self-righting (P&S) lifeboat, funded from the collection by Capt. F. Saumarez Fraser, RN, built by Forrestt of Limehouse, London, costing £246.); Sold in 1888.
1887–1902	112	Queen Victoria	1887	34-foot self-righting (P&S)	(Note: 34 ft 0 in (10.36 m) x 7 ft 6 in (2.29 m) (10-oared) self-righting (P&S) lifeboat, funded by the RNLI, built by Forrestt of Limehouse, London, costing £440.); Sold in 1902. Renamed The Ark. Now restored and stored for display as Queen Victoria at Classic Boat Museum, West Cowes, IOW, December 2025.
1902–1922	468	Queen Victoria	1902	35-foot self-righting (P&S)	(Note: 35 ft 0 in (10.67 m) x 8 ft 6 in (2.59 m) (10-oared) self-righting (P&S) lifeboat, funded by the RNLI, built by Roberts of Mevagissey, costing £631.); Transferred to Porthoustock.

Pre ON numbers are unofficial numbers used by the Lifeboat Enthusiasts' Society to reference early lifeboats not included on the official RNLI list.

=== Motor lifeboats ===
On station	ON	Op.No. (Note: Op. No. is the RNLI's Operational Number of the boat carried on the hull.)	Name	Built	Class	Comments
1922–1939	676	–	Langham	1922	40-foot self-righting (motor)	(Note: 40 ft 0 in (12.19 m) x 10 ft 6 in (3.20 m) self-righting (motor) lifeboat, legacy of Mr T. G. Langham, and a gift from his Executors, built by J. Samuel White of Cowes, costing £7,781.); Transferred to the Relief fleet. Sold in 1950. Renamed Freedom. On display as Langham at Arreton Barns Craft Village, IOW, September 2025.
1939–1970	822	–	Jesse Lumb	1939	46-foot Watson	
1970–1987	1009	48-006	Jack Shayler and the Lees	1969	Solent	Transferred to Dunbar.
1987–2009	1126	47-018	Max Aitken III	1987	Tyne	
2009–2010	1124	12-001	Peggy and Alex Caird	1988	Mersey	Relief fleet
2010–	1297	16-17	Alfred Albert Williams	2010	Tamar	

More post-service details can be found on the respective lifeboat class pages.

=== D class Inshore lifeboats ===
On station	Op.No.	Name	Class	Comments
1964	D-8	Unnamed	D-class (RFD PB16)	
1965–1967	D-18	Unnamed	D-class (RFD PB16)	
1967–1968	D-144	Unnamed	D-class (RFD PB16)	
1969–1971	D-24	Unnamed	D-class (RFD PB16)	
1971–1975	D-101	Unnamed	D-class (RFD PB16)	
1976–1987	D-244	Unnamed	D-class (Zodiac III)	
1987–1996	D-353	Unnamed	D-class (EA16)	
1996–2005	D-503	Criddy and Tom	D-class (EA16)	
2005–2015	D-649	Dorothy Beatrice May Gorman	D-class (IB1)	
2015–2026	D-778	Norman Harvey	D-class (IB1)	
2026–	D-912	Sue	D-class (IB1)	

=== Launch and recovery tractors ===
Op.No.	Reg.No.	Type	On station	Comments
T100	D466 RAW	Talus MB-H Crawler	2009–2010	

== Gallery ==
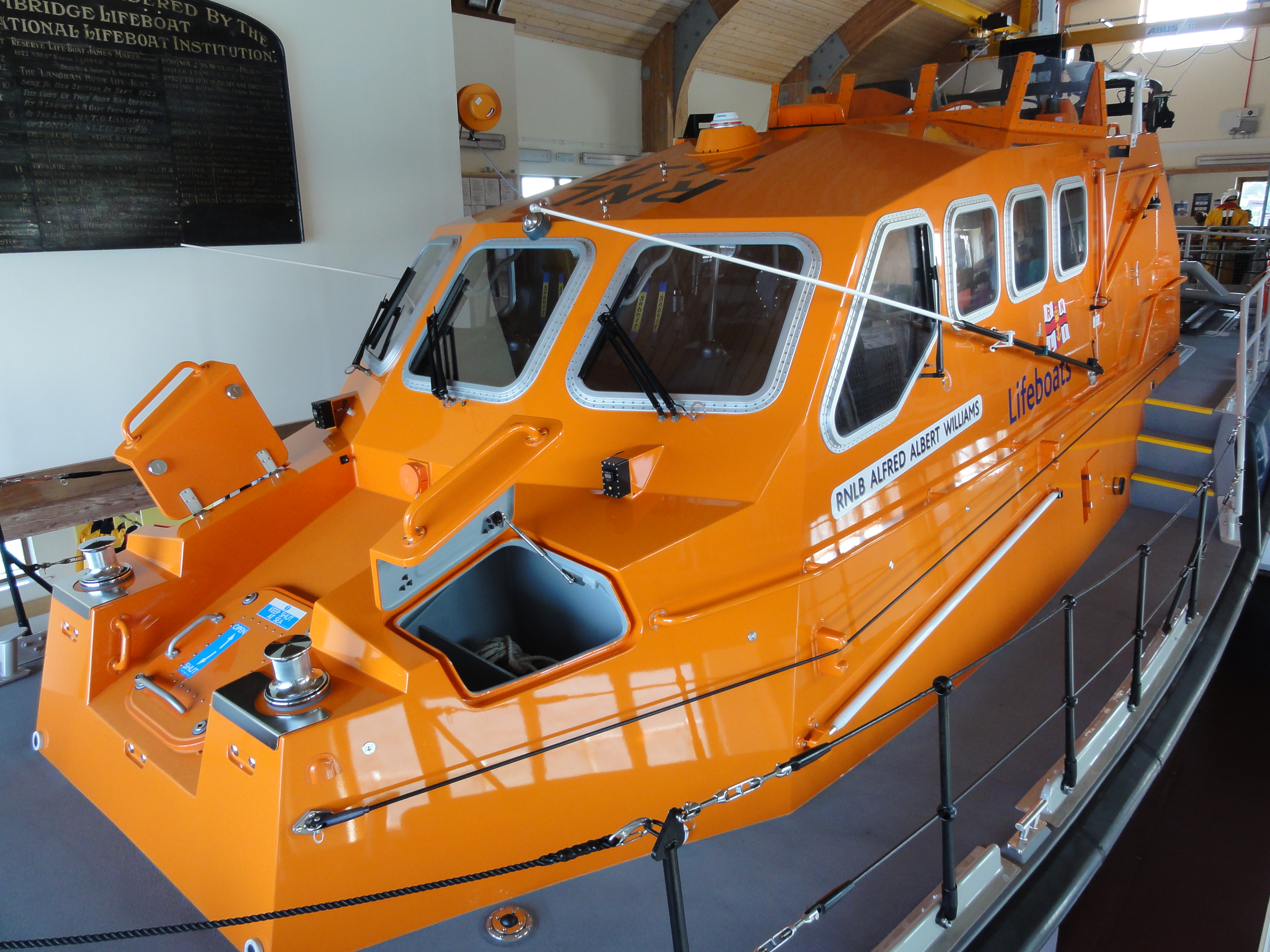
The current Tamar-class all-weather lifeboat Alfred Albert Williams (ON-1297). Designed to be launched from a slipway, with her mast and aerials being lowered to fit into the Bembridge boathouse which was built specifically to house this class of lifeboat.

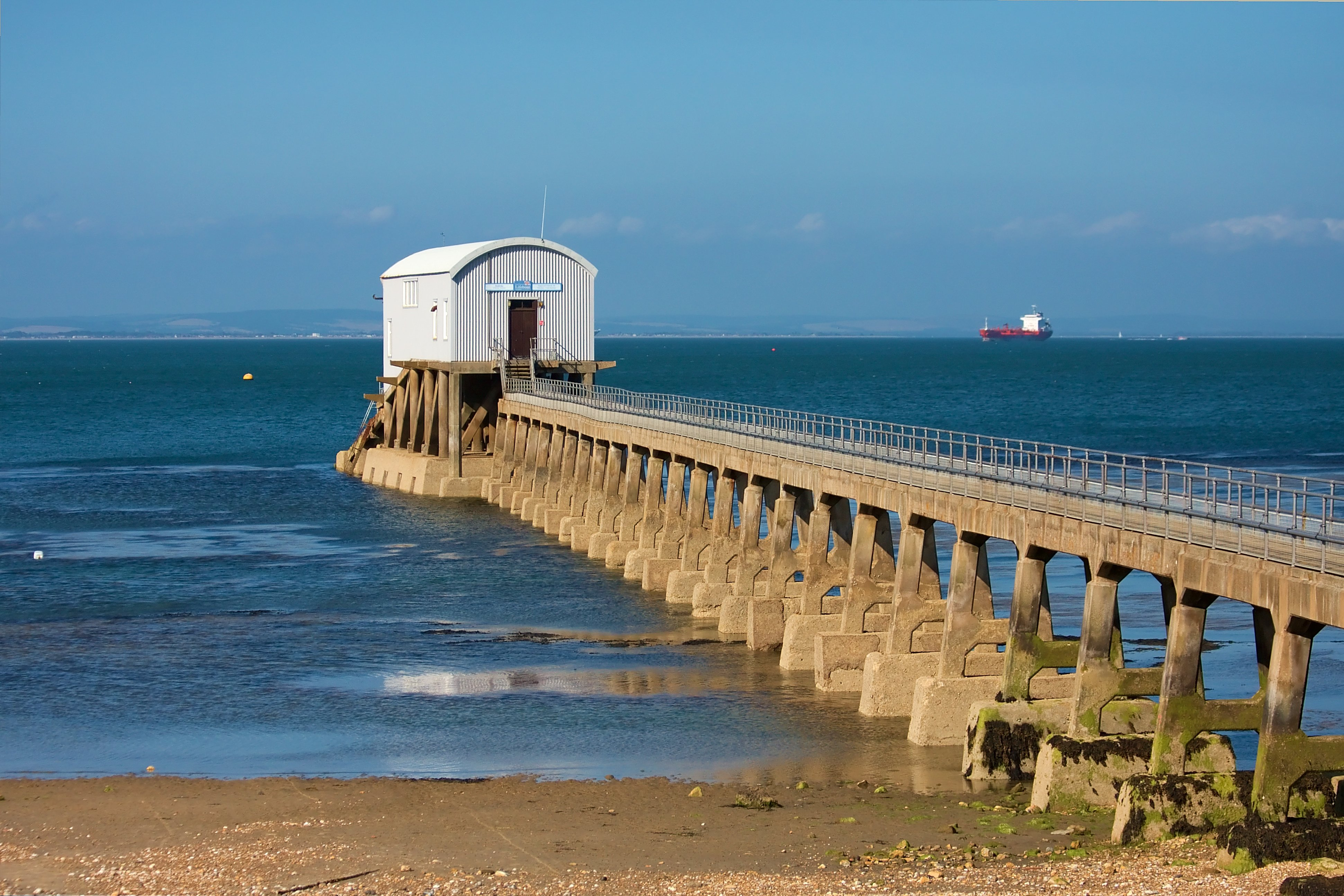
The boathouse at Bembridge before the major re-development of the station which started in 2009 and was completed in 2010.

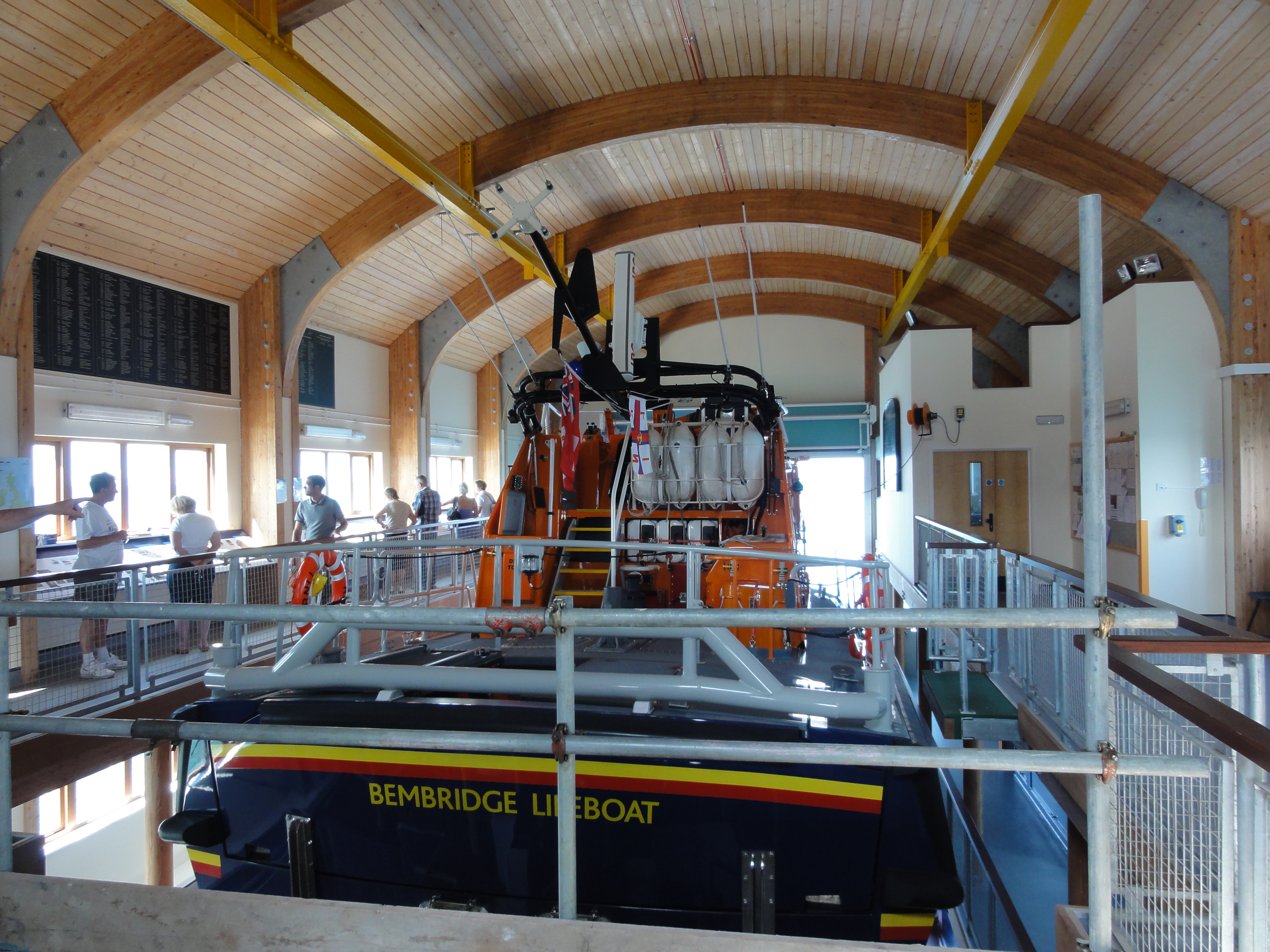
An interior view of the Bembridge boathouse with the Tamar-class Alfred Albert Williams in situ.

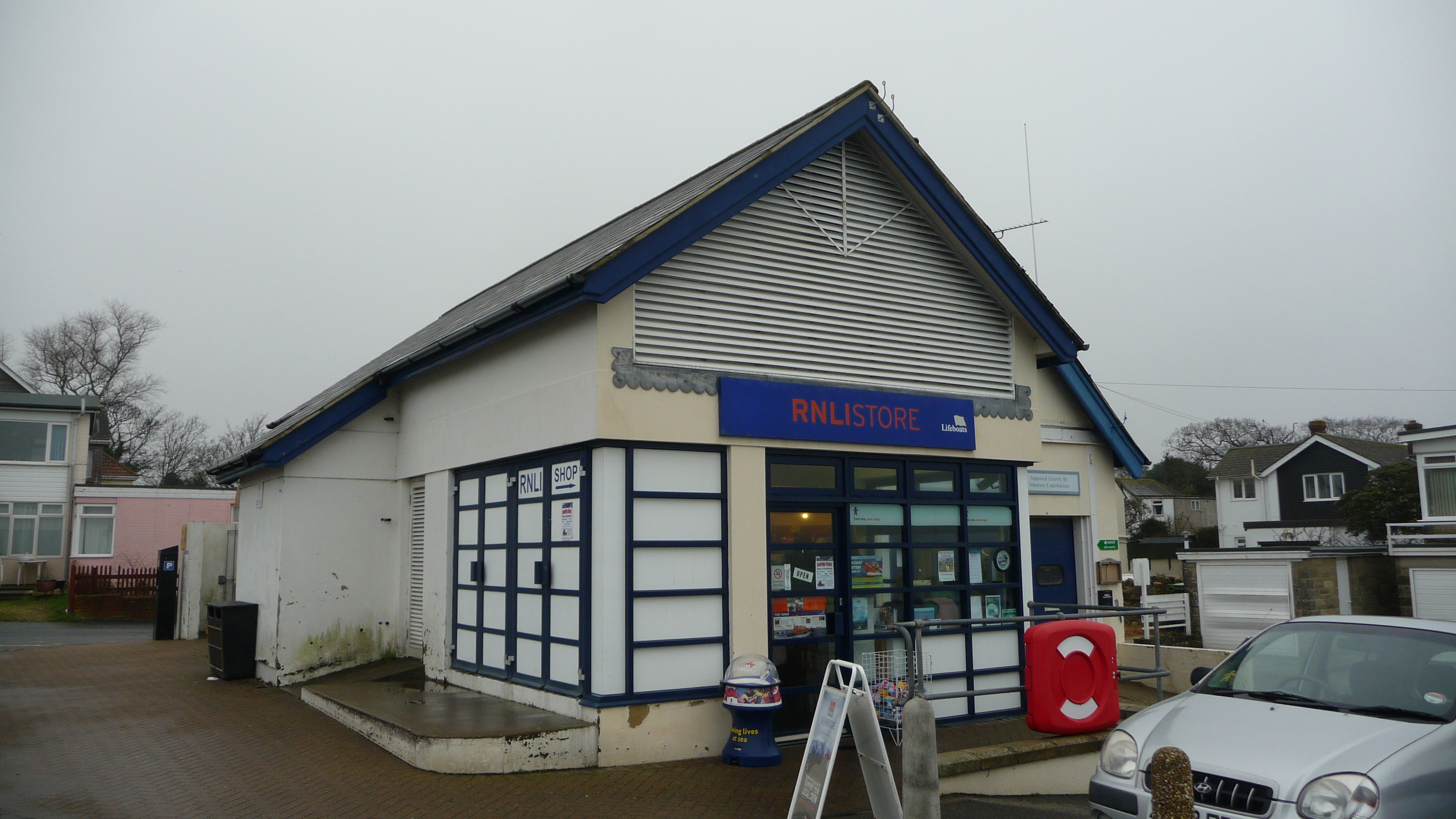
The RNLI gift shop at Lane End is housed in the original 1867 boathouse.

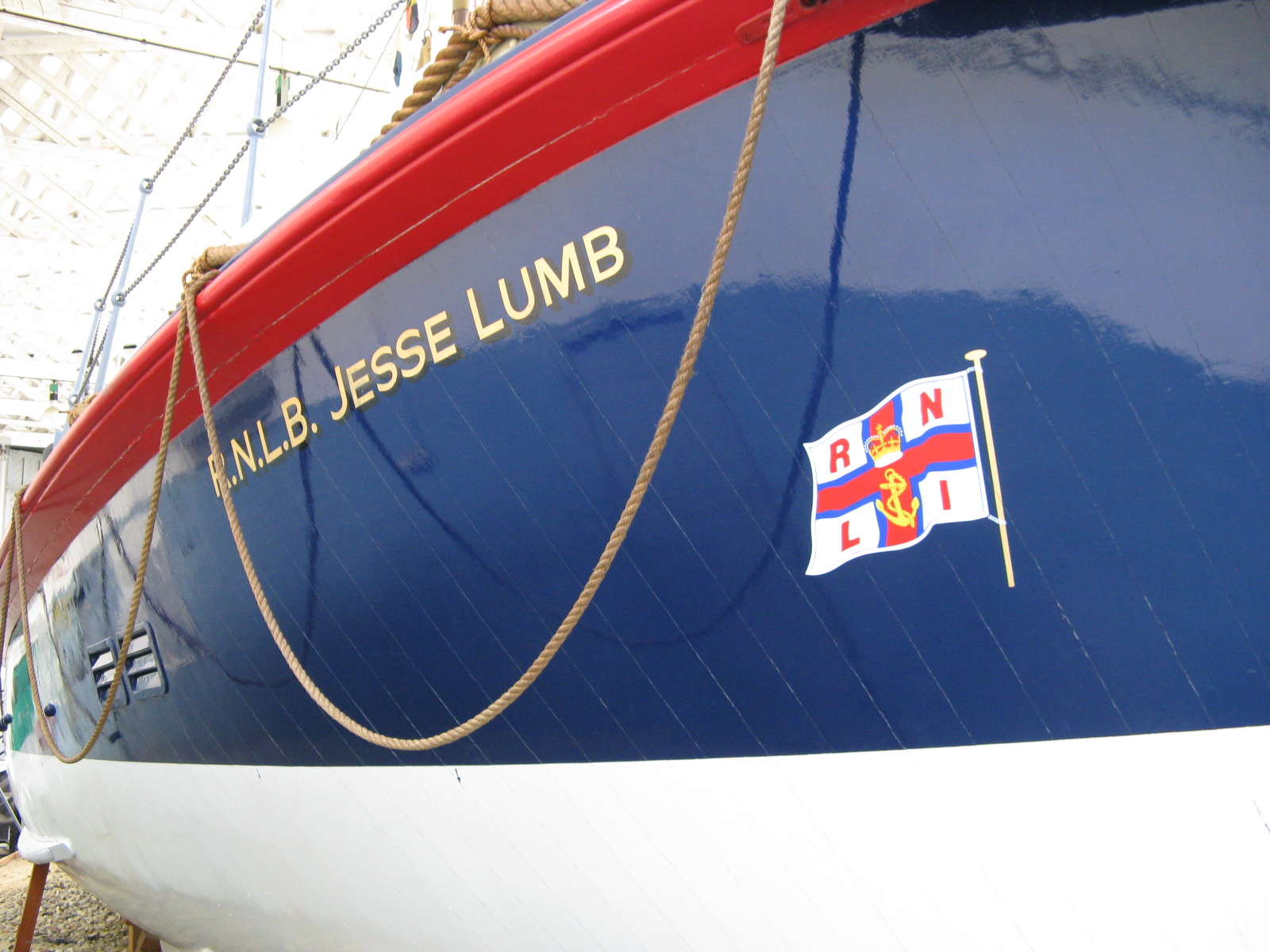
The former Bembridge lifeboat RNLB Jesse Lumb (ON-822). The 46ft Watson-class lifeboat is displayed at the Imperial War Museum at Duxford. It is on the National Register of Historic Vessels, becoming part of the National Historic Fleet.

== See also ==
- List of RNLI stations
- List of former RNLI stations
- Royal National Lifeboat Institution lifeboats

== Sources ==
- Leonard, Richie; Denton, Tony (2025). Lifeboat Enthusiasts Handbook 2025. Lifeboats Enthusiasts' Society.
- Leonard, Richie; Denton, Tony (2026). Lifeboat Enthusiasts Handbook 2026. Lifeboats Enthusiasts' Society.
