= Barrow Lifeboat Station =

RNLI lifeboat station in Cumbria, England

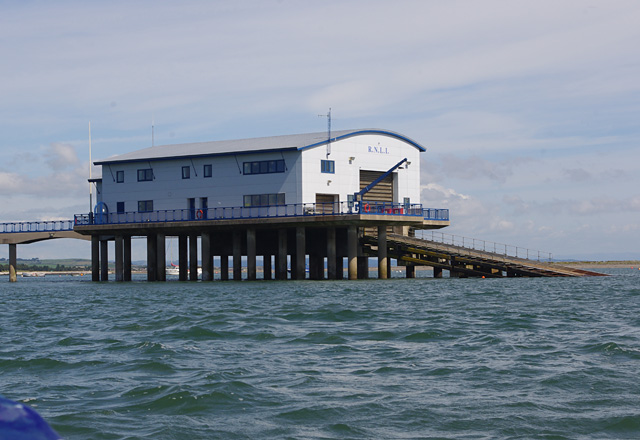
- Barrow Lifeboat Station

- Location within Cumbria
- Former names: Piel (Barrow) Lifeboat Station

General information
- Type: RNLI Lifeboat Station
- Location: Piel Street, Roa Island, Barrow-in-Furness, Cumbria, LA13 0QQ, England
- Coordinates: 54°04′21.2″N 3°10′24.0″W
- Opened: 1864
- Owner: Royal National Lifeboat Institution

Website
- Barrow RNLI Lifeboat Station

Barrow Lifeboat Station is located on Roa Island, near the town of Barrow in Furness, formerly part of Lancashire, but now in Cumbria.

A lifeboat was first stationed at Barrow-in-Furness by the Royal National Lifeboat Institution (RNLI) in 1864.

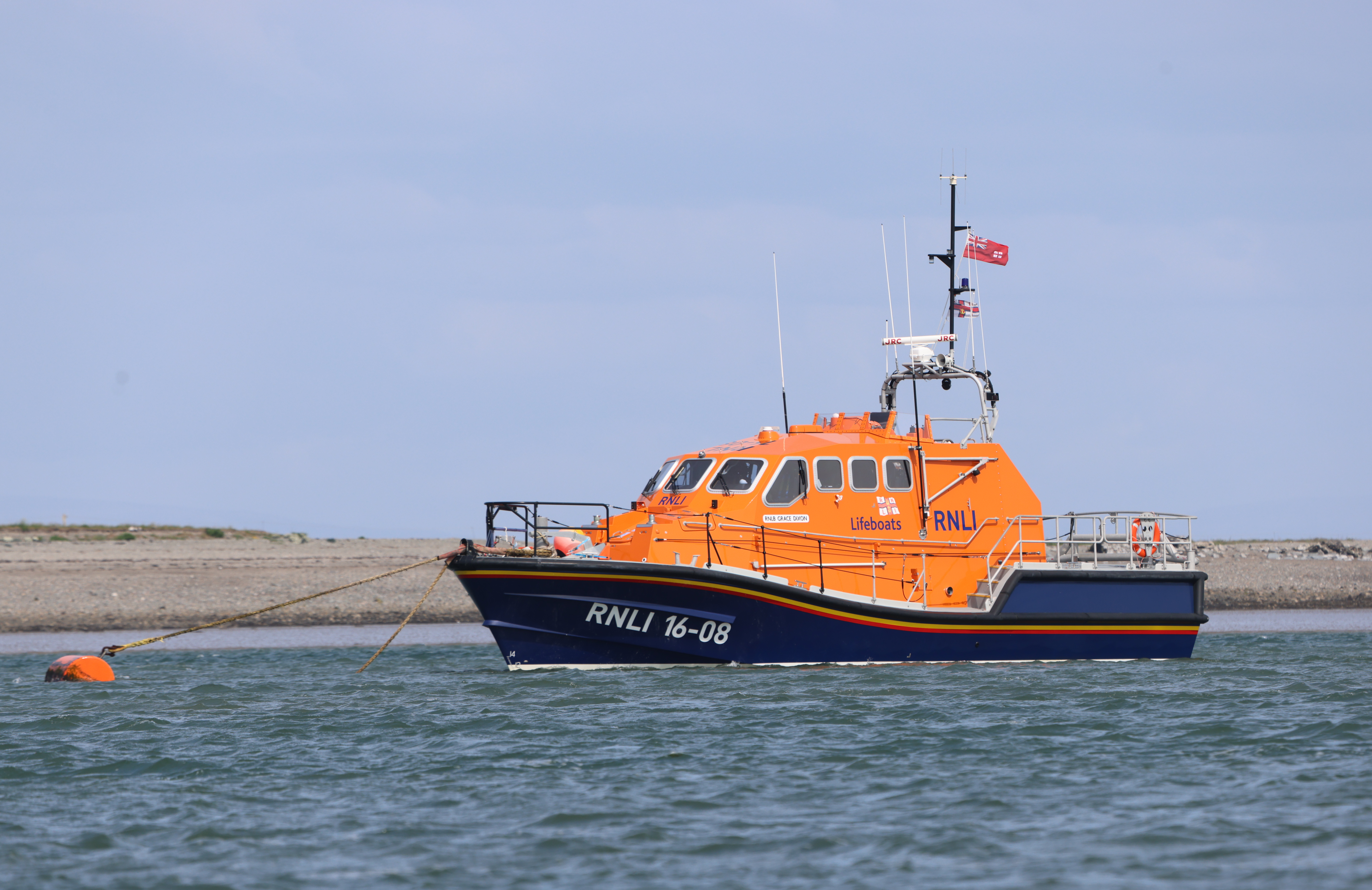
Tamar-class All-weather lifeboat 16-08 Grace Dixon (ON 1288)

The station currently operates a slipway launched Tamar-class All-weather lifeboat, 16-08 Grace Dixon (ON 1288), on station since 2008, and a D-class (IB1) Inshore lifeboat, Raymond and Dorothy Billingham (D-866), on station since 2022.

== History ==
In 1864, Barrow industrialist James Ramsden, and Capt. L. Barstow, RN, Inspecting Commander of Coastguard, wrote to the RNLI requesting that a lifeboat be stationed at Barrow. At a meeting of the RNLI committee of management on 7 April 1864, with the additional offer of local funding, a new station was agreed.

A station was built on Roa Island, the island having been joined to the mainland with the construction of a causeway in 1846. It is located 2.5 miles (4.0 km) south of Barrow, overlooking Piel Channel, the entrance to the Port of Barrow, with easy access to the Irish Sea. The station was named as Piel (Barrow) Lifeboat Station.

The first boat supplied to the station had previously served at Berwick-upon-Tweed, and was a 30 ft (9.1 m) self-righting pulling & sailing type lifeboat. For Barrow, it was modified to be a 12-oared boat, and extended to 36-feet, at a cost of over £200. The boat was funded by a group of commercial travellers, as directed by W. Bishop, of Boston, Lincolnshire and R. Affleck of Manchester, the latter better known as one of the founders of Manchester department store Affleck and Brown. The boat arrived on Roa Island on 7 December 1864, having been transported free of charge by the London and North Western, Lancashire and Yorkshire, and Whitehaven and Furness Railway Companies.

Funds were raised locally for a new brick built boathouse, costing £239-14s-3d, which was designed by RNLI Consulting Architect Mr. C. H. Cooke, and built by William Gradwell. The boathouse was opened in a ceremony on 28 July 1865, and the boat was named Commercial Traveller No.1. James Ramsden, Company Secretary — and soon to be Managing Director — of the Furness Railway Company, was appointed Honorary Secretary.

In 1878, the name of the boat was changed to William Birkett, in acknowledgment of the legacy of Mr William Birkett of Newton in Cartmel. A replacement lifeboat boat later assigned to Piel (Barrow) Lifeboat station in 1887, built by Forrestt of Limehouse, London, was also named William Birkett (ON 122).

A new launchway was built in 1884, funded by the Furness Railway Company, followed in 1885 with a new wooden boathouse. This proved a great success, with reports of the lifeboat being able to be launched in six minutes. However, then ensued a period of location and relocation.

In 1889, after the arrival of the slightly larger 38 ft (12 m) William Birkett (ON 122), the RNLI Inspector recommended that the lifeboat be relocated to moorings at the harbour yard in Barrow. This station was named Barrow Lifeboat Station. However, it was soon noted that the boat's hull was being fouled by worms, and also that the crew often ended up getting soaked, even before their struggle to board the moored lifeboat. In 1892, the boat was brought ashore, and housed in the same wooden boathouse, which was relocated from Roa Island. A 150-foot-long (46 m) slipway was initially constructed, and then extended back to the boathouse in 1894.

Circumstances were still not satisfactory, and much discussion was held regarding the return to Roa Island, with improved crew availability, and its location being better suited, as considered back in 1864. The RNLI then placed a second lifeboat at Peel (Barrow) Lifeboat Station on Roa Island in 1898, the Thomas Fielden (ON 300), again moored afloat. But problems persisted with boarding the moored boat, which proved impossible in bad conditions. The Thomas Fielden was then housed at the Old Watch House.

The William Birkett (ON 122) was retired in 1899, and Barrow Lifeboat Station closed. The wooden boathouse was removed from Barrow, and relocated back at Roa Island in 1900.

Problems still persisted. A new larger boat was provided in 1901, this being a second boat named Thomas Fielden (ON 462), but the size and weight made launching difficult. A trolley system was devised for launching the boat down the slipway. A high tide surge brought water 5-feet into the boathouse, so the wooden boathouse was moved yet again, this time higher and further from the water, with the slipway extended.

== 1927 onwards ==
Thomas Fielden (ON 462) served until 1927, when she was replaced by a motor-powered lifeboat, a 45-foot 6in Watson-class lifeboat, the N. T. with two 40-hp 'Weyburn CE4' petrol engines, and a single propeller, giving a speed of 8 knots (15 km/h; 9.2 mph). She was built by J. Samuel White of Cowes, and cost £10,826.

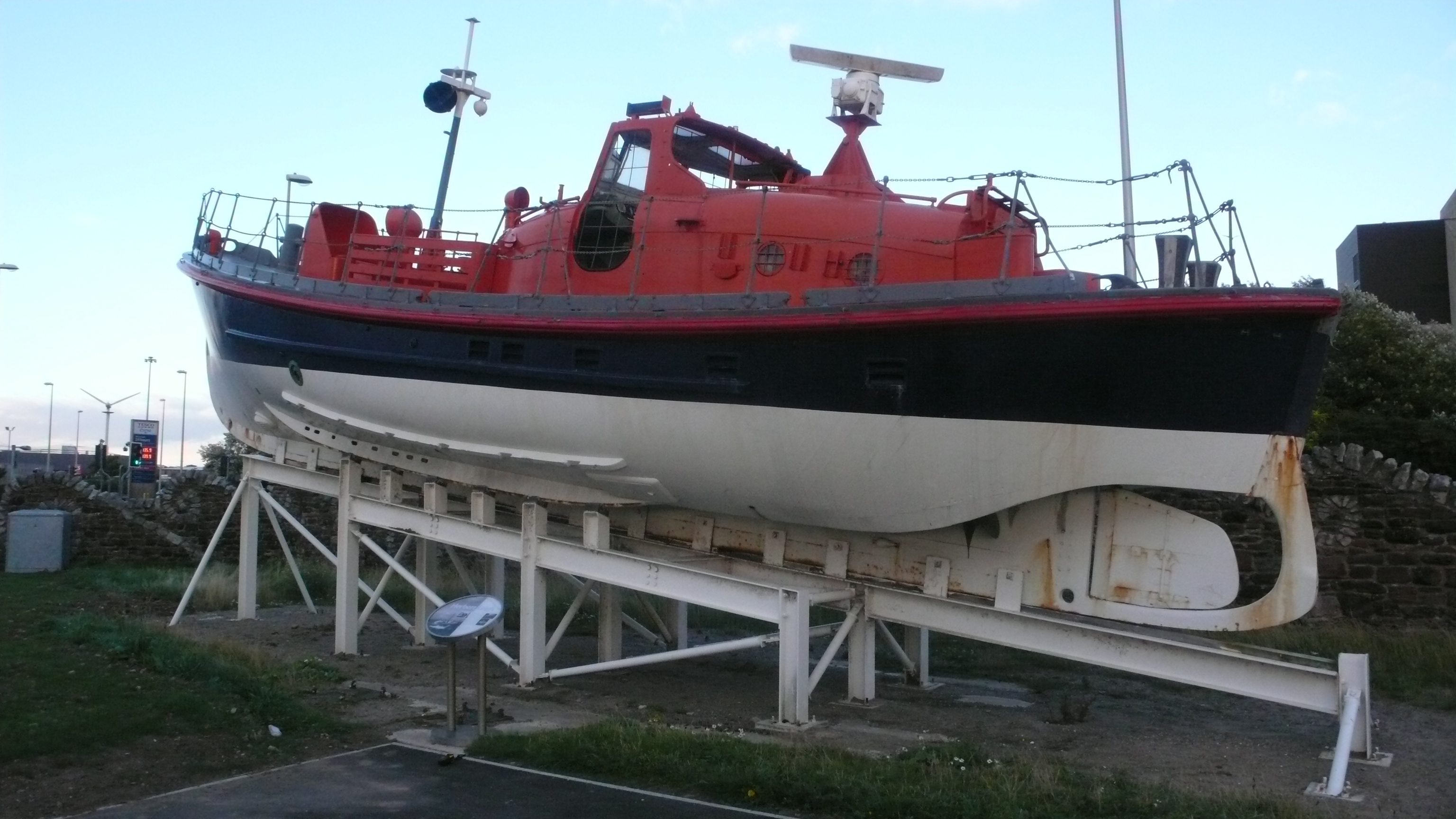
Former Barrow 46ft 9in Watson lifeboat Herbert Leigh (ON 900) on display at Barrow Dock Museum

The wooden boathouse was no longer big enough, so a new boathouse was built on a specially built pier, located at the end of Piel street. The 393 ft 6 in-long (119.94 m) roller-slipway was the longest at any RNLI station. At a cost of £14,000, the new boathouse and slipway were opened in September 1929.

The name of Piel (Barrow) Lifeboat Station was formally changed to Barrow Lifeboat Station in 1935.

In 1964, in response to an increasing amount of water-based leisure activity, the RNLI placed 25 small fast Inshore lifeboats around the country. These were easily launched with just a few people, ideal to respond quickly to local emergencies. Barrow received one of the first ones on 11 April 1964. the unnamed D-class (RFD PB16) (D-15). She was first used on service just nine days later.

In the 1990s, the RNLI were looking for a replacement for the Tyne-class lifeboat, such as 47-014 James Bibby (ON 1117), which had been assigned to Barrow in 1986. Another new boathouse would be required for these new fast-slipway Tamar-class lifeboats. Demolition of the 1929 boathouse started in January 1999, with the new pier, boathouse and slipway being completed at a cost of £3million, and formally handed over to the RNLI in July 2001. James Bibby was withdrawn from service at Barrow in 2008, handing over to the Tamar-class lifeboat 16-08 Grace Dixon (ON 1288).

== Station honours ==
The following are awards made at Barrow-in-Furness:

- Knight Bachelor
  James Ramsden – 1872
- Silver Lifesaving Medal, awarded by The Finnish Government
  Eb Charnley, Coxswain – 1937
- RNLI Bronze Medal
  James Orr Moore, Motor Mechanic – 1943
  Frank Moore, Assistant Mechanic – 1943
  Roland Moore, Coxswain – 1958
- Bronze Lifesaving Medal, awarded by The Finnish Government
  Barrow Lifeboat Crew – 1937
- 'The Thanks of the Institution inscribed on Vellum'
  Roland Moore, Coxswain – 1952
  Robert Charnley, Coxswain – 1974
- Vellum Service Certificates
  Ernie Diamond, Second Coxswain – 1974
  Frank Moore, Motor Mechanic – 1974
  Albert Benson, Assistant Mechanic – 1974
  Peter Charnley, crew member – 1974
  Thomas Keenan, crew member – 1974
  Paul Cochrane, crew member – 1974
  Anthony Barber, crew member – 1974
- 'A Framed Letter of Thanks signed by the Chairman of the Institution'
  Alexander Moore, Coxswain – 2003
- Member, Order of the British Empire (MBE)
  Terence Downing – 1988NYH
  Alexander Moore, Coxswain – 2006NYH
  Group Captain John William Green – 2010QBH
- British Empire Medal
  Roland Moore – 1970NYH
  Frank Moore, Motor Mechanic – 1979NYH

== Barrow lifeboats ==
=== Pulling and Sailing (P&S) lifeboats ===
ON (Note: ON is the RNLI's Official Number of the boat.)	Name	Built	On station	Class	Comments
Pre-295	Commercial Traveller No.1	1855	1864−1878	36-foot self-righting (P&S)	(Note: 36-foot x 8-foot 3in (12-oared) self-righting (P&S) lifeboat, funded by the Commercial Travellers LB fund, built by Forrestt of Limehouse, London, costing £156 when new. Lengthened from 30-foot x 7-foot 6in in 1863.); Previously at Berwick-upon-Tweed. Renamed William Birkett in 1878.
Pre-295	William Birkett	1855	1878–1887	36-foot self-righting (P&S)	(Note: Legacy of Mr W. Birkett of Newton-in-Cartmel.); Sold in 1887.
122	William Birkett	1887	1887−1899	38-foot self-righting (P&S)	(Note: 38 ft 0 in (11.58 m) x 9 ft 0 in (2.74 m) (12-oared) self-righting (P&S) lifeboat, funded by the legacy of Mr W. Birkett of Newton-in-Cartmel, built by Forrest of Limehouse, London, costing £606.); Sold in 1899.
300	Thomas Fielden	1891	1898−1901	39-foot self-righting (P&S)	(Note: 39 ft 0 in (11.89 m) x 9 ft 0 in (2.74 m) (12-oared) self-righting (P&S) lifeboat, funded from the gift of S. John and Joshua Fielden of Todmorden, built by R. McAlister of Dumbarton, costing £448 when new.); Previously at Holyhead. Transferred to the Relief fleet. Broken up in 1904.
462	Thomas Fielden	1901	1901−1927	40-foot Watson (P&S)	Transferred to Angle.

Pre ON numbers are unofficial numbers used by the Lifeboat Enthusiasts' Society to reference early lifeboats not included on the official RNLI list.

=== Motor lifeboats ===
ON	Op.No. (Note: Op. No. is the RNLI's Operational Number of the boat carried on the hull.)	Name	Built	On station	Class	Comments
701	−	N. T.	1927	1927−1951	45-foot 6in Watson	Transferred to Workington.
900	−	Herbert Leigh	1951	1951−1982	46-foot 9in Watson	
932	−	Howard Marryat	1957	1982−1986	46-foot 9in Watson	Previously at Fishguard. Transferred to Moelfre.
1117	47-014	James Bibby	1986	1986−2008	Tyne	Transferred to the Relief fleet. Later at Shoreham Harbour.
1288	16-08	Grace Dixon	2007	2008−	Tamar	

More post-service details can be found on the respective lifeboat class pages.

=== Inshore lifeboats ===
==== D class ====
Op.No.	Name	On station	Class	Comments
D-15	Unnamed	1964	D-class (RFD PB16)	
D-28	Unnamed	1964	D-class (RFD PB16)	
D-43	Unnamed	1965−1972	D-class (RFD PB16)	
D-198	Unnamed	1972−1986	D-class (RFD PB16)	
D-318	Modeller 1	1986−1993	D-class (EA16)	
D-443	Modeller II	1993−2001	D-class (EA16)	
D-567	Spirit of Tamworth	2001−2010	D-class (IB1)	
D-733	Vision of Tamworth	2010−2022	D-class (IB1)	
D-866	Raymond and Dorothy Billingham	2022−	D-class (IB1)	

== See also ==
- List of RNLI stations
- List of former RNLI stations
- Royal National Lifeboat Institution lifeboats
