= Angle Lifeboat Station =

RNLI Lifeboat station in Pembrokeshire, Wales

- Gorsaf Bad Achub Angle

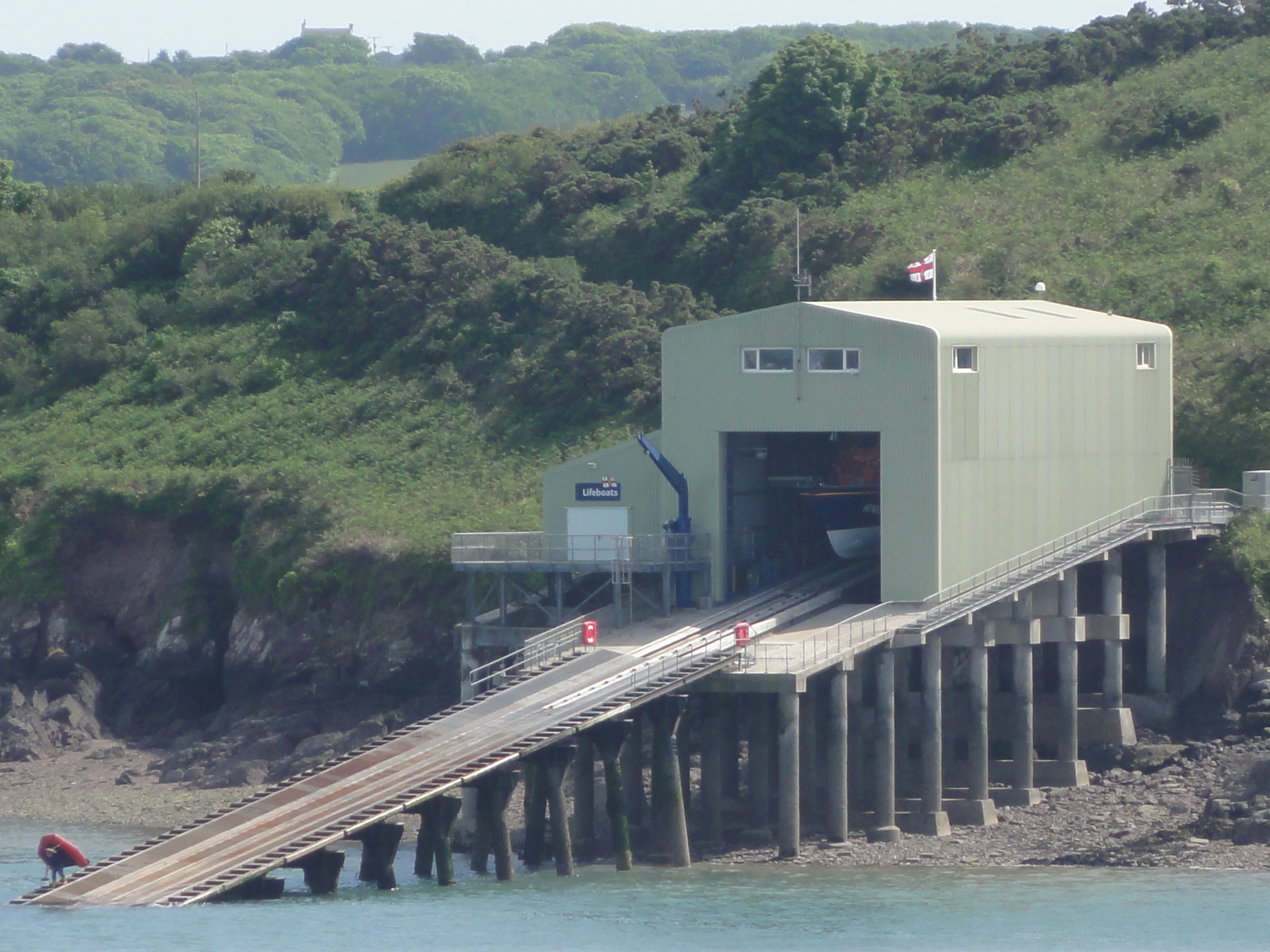
- Angle Lifeboat Station in 2015

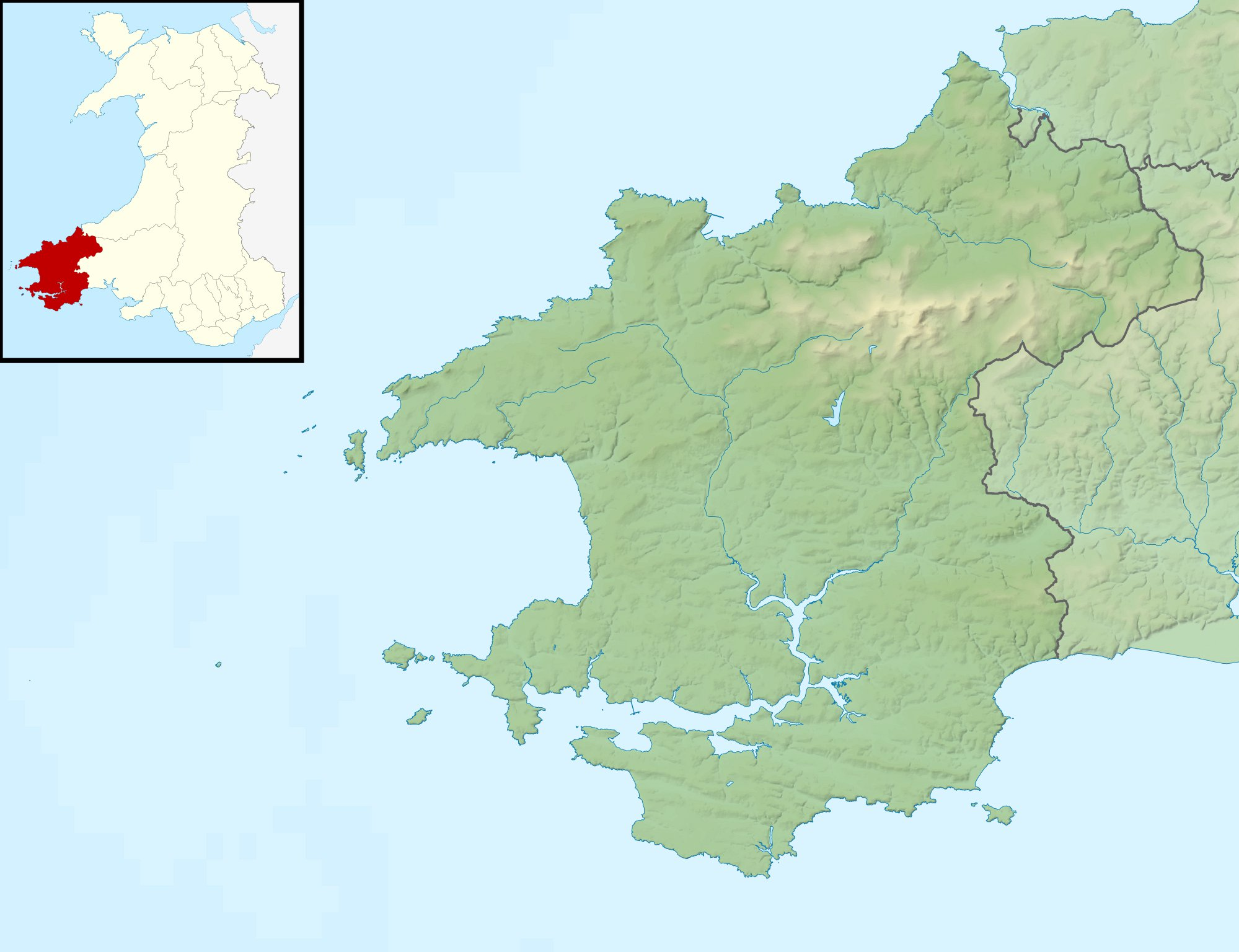
- Location within Pembrokeshire
- Former names: Milford Lifeboat Station; Angle, Milford Haven Lifeboat Station

General information
- Type: RNLI Lifeboat Station
- Location: Point Angle, Angle, Pembrokeshire, Wales, SA71 5AT, United Kingdom
- Coordinates: 51°41′08″N 5°04′51″W
- Opened: 1868
- Owner: Royal National Lifeboat Institution

Website
- Angle RNLI Lifeboat Station

Angle Lifeboat Station (Welsh: Gorsaf Bad Achub Angle) is located near the village of Angle, on the southern side of the entrance to the Milford Haven Waterway, in Pembrokeshire, Wales.

A lifeboat was first stationed at Angle by the Royal National Lifeboat Institution (RNLI) in 1868.

The station currently operates a Tamar-class lifeboat, 16-11 Mark Mason (ON 1291), on station since 2009.

== History ==
Ever since its founding in 1824, the Royal National Institution for the Preservation of Life from Shipwreck (RNIPLS), later to become the RNLI in 1854, would award medals for deeds of gallantry at sea, even if no lifeboats were involved. Three silver medals were awarded for local rescues prior to the establishment of a lifeboat station at Angle. On 19 November 1850, Thomas Landells, Tide Surveyor for H.M. Customs, would rescue eight people from the schooner Maria.

At a meeting of the RNLI committee of management on Thursday 5 December 1867, a letter was read from Inspecting Commander Harvey, RN, of Milford coastguard. Offering the support of local gentlemen to form a local branch, he requested that a lifeboat station be established as a necessity at Milford Haven, which was agreed. Milford Lifeboat Station was established at Angle Point, where a stone boat house and wooden slipway were constructed by Mr P. James, at a cost of £170-4s-0d, and a 33-foot self-righting 'pulling and sailing' (P&S) lifeboat, one with oars and sails, was built by Woolfe of Shadwell, London, at a cost of £275.

A second letter, received on 23 November 1867, was from Titus Salt Jr., who wished to defray the cost of the new station, and forwarded a cheque for the sum of £420. Titus Salt Jr. was the son of Bradford philanthropist Sir Titus Salt, famous for creating Saltaire model village, and married Catherine Crossley, daughter of the Halifax carpet manufacturer Joseph Crossley in 1866. Crossley's daughter was Catherine as per her birth certificate, but Katherine Street in Saltaire is named after her, and as per Salt Jr.'s wishes, the lifeboat was named Katherine at a ceremony on 28 November 1868.

In 1887, it was decided to replace the old wooden slipway with a new and longer slipway, 200 feet in length. A new 37-foot lifeboat, Henry Martin Harvey (ON 227) was placed at the station in 1888. The new boat would be returned to London for the addition of a drop-keel in 1891, returning in 1892. In October 1892, the station name was changed to Angle, Milford Haven Lifeboat Station.

Plans were announced in 1926 to place a motor-lifeboat at Angle, and construction began of a new larger boathouse and deep-water slipway, to the west side of the existing boathouse. It was completed in January 1929, at a cost of £20,000. On 10 January, a 45-foot 6in Watson-class lifeboat Elizabeth Elson (ON 713), arrived on station. With twin 40 hp petrol engines, she was capable of 8.23 knots. In her 28 years on service at Angle, she would be launched 58 times, and rescue 144 lives.

Coxswain James Watkins was awarded the RNLI Bronze Medal, for rescuing 28 people on 26 November 1929 from the single-screw steamship Molesley, which had been caught by a sudden wind change and a poor decision by its captain. Watkins went on to be awarded the RNLI Silver Medal for rescuing six people in 1944 from the motor boat Thor, and a year later, a second bronze medal (clasp), for a difficult rescue of nine people from the steamer Walter L M Russ. (This steamer had been seized from the Germans and sank on 15 July before it could be renamed the Empire Concourse.) James Watkins finally retired in 1946 after 24 years service as coxswain and 13 years as second coxswain.

For over nine hours on 5–6 August 1973, the lifeboat Richard Vernon & Mary Garforth of Leeds (ON 931) stood by the oil tanker Donna Marike, which was carrying high-octane fuel, and at risk of explosion. On 1 December 1978, in gale-force conditions, three people were rescued from the fishing boat Cairnsmore, one of them from the water. For these two services, Coxswain William John Rees Holmes was awarded the RNLI Bronze Medal and a second service clasp.

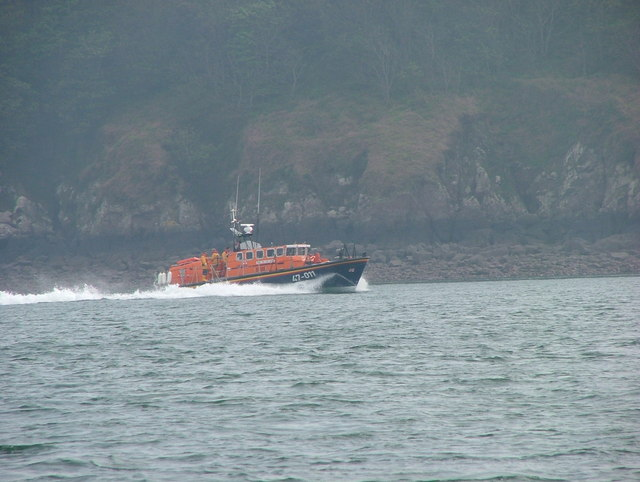
The Lady Rank, Chapel Bay (2007)

A Tyne-class class lifeboat was placed on service in August 1987, 47-011 The Lady Rank (ON 1114), named for Lady Laura Ellen Rank, the late wife of entertainment mogul J. Arthur Rank. Col George Jackson, then chairman of Angle lifeboat station accepted the lifeboat from Robin Cowen, chairman of the Rank Foundation and husband to the Lord and Lady Rank's daughter Shelagh, who served as sponsor. The Lady Rank would serve Angle for the next 21 years.

In 1991, construction began of a new, larger, boathouse and slipway adjacent to the 1927 structure. Following completion in 1992, the old boathouse and slipway were demolished.

A D-class Inshore lifeboat was first placed at the station in 1994, and in 1996, the D-class (EA16) lifeboat Isabella Mary (D-493) began service at the station.

On 5 May 1997, the motor boat, Dale Princess was blown on to cliffs on Skomer Island. For rescuing four people in gale-force winds and stormy seas, Coxswain Jeremy R. Rees was awarded the RNLI bronze medal.

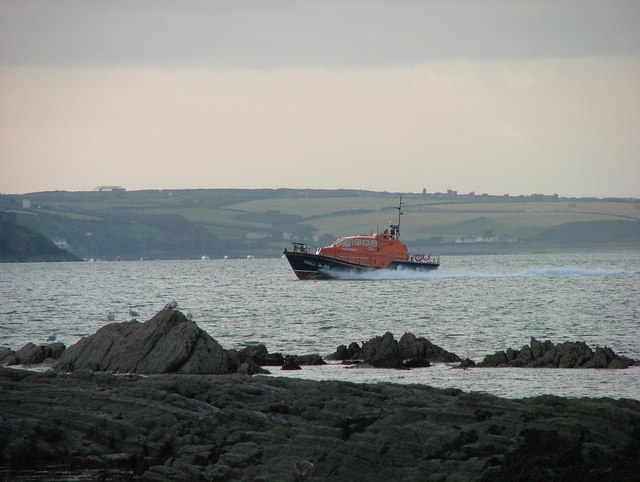
Tamar-class 16-11 Mark Mason

The Lady Rank was withdrawn to the relief fleet in 2008, later to serve as ADES 20 Bicentenary BSE with the lifeboat service in Uruguay. After a brief spell with another Tyne-class lifeboat on station, 47-010 RFA Sir Galahad (ON 1112), the 1992 boathouse was modified, and in 2009, the station received a new Tamar-class lifeboat 16-11 Mark Mason (ON 1291).

In May 2024, it was reported that difficulties maintaining crew and helpers may force the relocation of the Angle lifeboat. For 12 years, a declining local population has meant the crew were primarily found in Milford Haven, and were transported to the station when called, a distance of 17 miles (27 km) if by road.

On 31 July 2024, a six-month trial was announced, with the Angle lifeboat operating from the port authority jetty at Milford Haven.

=== Loch Shiel ===
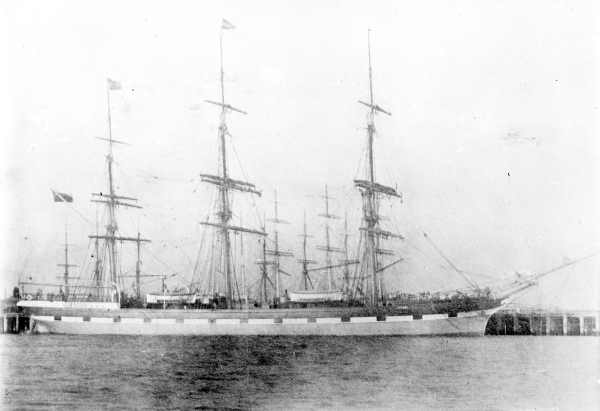
The Loch Shiel

In 1894, 33 people were saved from the 1878-built Loch Shiel which had run onto rocks at Thorn Island. 27 people had managed to scramble on to the rocks, but were still at the mercy of the weather. The lifeboat rescued the six people still on board the Loch Shiel. Three lifeboatmen were then landed elsewhere on the island, climbing around Thorn Island to a position above the 27 survivors, and using ropes, eventually hauling all of them up to safety. Two lifeboat crew members and the honorary secretary were each awarded the RNLI Silver Medal, including Thomas Rees, who would later become Coxswain.

The rescue is described as Wales' "Whisky Galore". The Loch Shiel was carrying goods from Scotland to Adelaide and included gunpowder, beer, and 7,500 (some say 7,000) cases of Glasgow whisky. The cargo was partially recovered by HM Customs and Excise, but some of the bottles are still amongst the wreck and are described as "undrinkable". In 1999, bottles of beer from the wreck were auctioned for £1,000 per bottle.

== Station honours ==
The following are awards made at Angle:

- RNIPLS Silver Medal
  William Field, farmer, former Master Mariner – 1833
  Thomas Landells, Tide Surveyor, H.M. Customs – 1850
- RNLI Silver Medal
  John Large, Master Gunner, RA – 1861
  Maj. Richard William Mirehouse, Honorary Secretary – 1894
  Edward Ball, crew member – 1894
  Thomas Rees, crew member – 1894
  James Watkins, Coxswain – 1944
- RNLI Bronze Medal
  James Watkins, Coxswain – 1929
  James Watkins, Coxswain – 1945 (Second-service award)
  William John Rees Holmes, Coxswain – 1973
  William John Rees Holmes, Coxswain/Mechanic – 1979 (Second-service award)
  Jeremy Richard Rees, Coxswain – 1997
- Medal Service Certificate
  Gerald Edwards, Second Coxswain – 1973
  Michael Eynon, Assistant Mechanic – 1973
  Anthony Stewart, Crew member – 1973
  Roger Callaghan, Crew member – 1973
  William Watkins, Crew member – 1973
  Gerald Edwards, crew member – 1979
  Roger O'Callaghan, crew member – 1979
  Norman Knowles, crew member – 1979
  Jeffrey Stringer, crew member – 1979
  Danny Richards, crew member - 1979
  Stephen O'Leary, crew member – 1979
- 'The Thanks of the Institution inscribed on Vellum'
  Col. Mirehouse, Honorary Secretary – 1893
  Albert Rees, Mechanic – 1944
  William John Rees Holmes, Coxswain/Mechanic – 1977
- Vellum Service Certificates
  Brian Brown, Second Coxswain – 1977
  Michael Eynon, Assistant Mechanic – 1977
  Anthony Stewart, Second Assistant Mechanic – 1977
  Peter Jones, crew member – 1977
  Daniel Richards, crew member – 1977
- A special framed certificate
  Coxswain and Crew – 1977 (Fastnet Race)
- 'A Framed Letter of Thanks signed by the Chairman of the Institution'
  The crew of The Lady Rank – 1997
- Member, Order of the British Empire (MBE)
  Michael John Eynon – 2000

== Angle lifeboats ==
=== Pulling and Sailing lifeboats ===
ON (Note: ON is the RNLI's Official Number of the boat.)	Name	Built	On station	Class	Comments
Pre-512	Katherine	1868	1868–1888	33-foot Peake self-righting (P&S)	(Note: 33 ft 0 in (10.06 m) x 8 ft 6 in (2.59 m) (10-oared) self-righting (P&S) lifeboat, gift of Mr T. Salt Jr. of Bradford, built by Woolfe of Shadwell, London. at a cost of £275.); Sold in 1888.
223	Henry Martin Harvey	1888	1888–1906	37-foot self-righting (P&S)	(Note: 37 ft 0 in (11.28 m) x 8 ft 0 in (2.44 m) (12-oared) self-righting (P&S) lifeboat, legacy of Mr H. M. Harvey of Hexworthy, built by Hansen of Cowes. at a cost of £418.); Sold in 1906.
46	Charlotte	1886	1906–1910	37-foot self-righting (P&S)	(Note: 37 ft 0 in (11.28 m) x 8 ft 0 in (2.44 m) (12-oared) self-righting (P&S) lifeboat, legacy of Miss A. F. Howis of Tulse Hill, London, built by Forrestt of Limehouse, London, costing £374 when new.); Previously at Porthoustock. Transferred to St Davids.
438	Reserve No. 6	1899	1915–1919	35-foot self-righting (P&S)	(Note: 37 ft 0 in (11.28 m) x 8 ft 0 in (2.44 m) (12-oared) self-righting (P&S) lifeboat, legacy of Mr J. Stevens of Birmingham, built by Thames Ironworks of Blackwall, London, costing £823 when new.); Previously James Stevens No. 11 at New Romney. Returned to the relief fleet. Later at Johnshaven.
434	Henry Dundas	1899	1919–1927	38-foot Watson (P&S)	(Note: 38 ft 0 in (11.58 m) x 9 ft 4 in (2.84 m) (12-oared) Watson-class non-self-righting (P&S) lifeboat, legacy of Mrs Dundas-Drummond of London, built by Thames Ironworks of Blackwall, London, costing £856 when new.); Previously at St Mary's. Sold in 1927.
462	Thomas Fielden	1901	1927–1929	40-foot Watson (P&S)	(Note: 40 ft 0 in (12.19 m) x 11 ft 0 in (3.35 m) (12-oared) Watson-class non-self-righting (P&S) lifeboat, legacy of gift of Samuel, John and Joshua Fielden of Todmorden, built by Thames Ironworks of Blackwall, London, costing £1,327 when new.); Previously at Barrow. Transferred to Moelfre.

Pre ON numbers are unofficial numbers used by the Lifeboat Enthusiasts' Society to reference early lifeboats not included on the official RNLI list.

=== Steam lifeboat ===
ON	Name	Built	On station	Class	Comments
420	James Stevens No. 3	1898	1908–1915	Steam	Damaged on rocks after breaking her moorings in 1914. Repaired and returned to service, but withdrawn in August 1915. Transferred to Totland Bay.

=== Motor lifeboats ===
ON	Op.No. (Note: Op. No. is the RNLI's Operational Number of the boat carried on the hull.)	Name	Built	On station	Class	Comments
713	–	Elizabeth Elson	1928	1929–1957	45-foot 6in Watson	
931	–	Richard Vernon & Mary Garforth of Leeds	1956	1957–1987	46-foot 9in Watson	Transferred to Wicklow.
1114	47-011	The Lady Rank	1987	1987–2008	Tyne	
1112	47-010	RFA Sir Galahad	1986	2008–2009	Tyne	Previously at Tenby
1291	16-11	Mark Mason	2009	2009–	Tamar	

More post-service details can be found on the respective lifeboat class pages.

=== Inshore lifeboats ===
Op.No.	Name	On station	Class	Comments
D-336	Unnamed	1994–1996	D-class (EA16)	Temporary assignment from the relief fleet,
D-493	Isabella Mary	1996–2004	D-class (EA16)	
D-638	Richard John Talbot Hillier	2004–2015	D-class (IB1)	
D-776	Super G II	2015–2020	D-class (IB1)	Inshore boat withdrawn 2020. Service coverage by Boarding Boat (BB-695)

== See also ==
- List of RNLI stations
- List of former RNLI stations
- Royal National Lifeboat Institution lifeboats
