= Tamar-class lifeboat =

UK slipway-launched lifeboat class

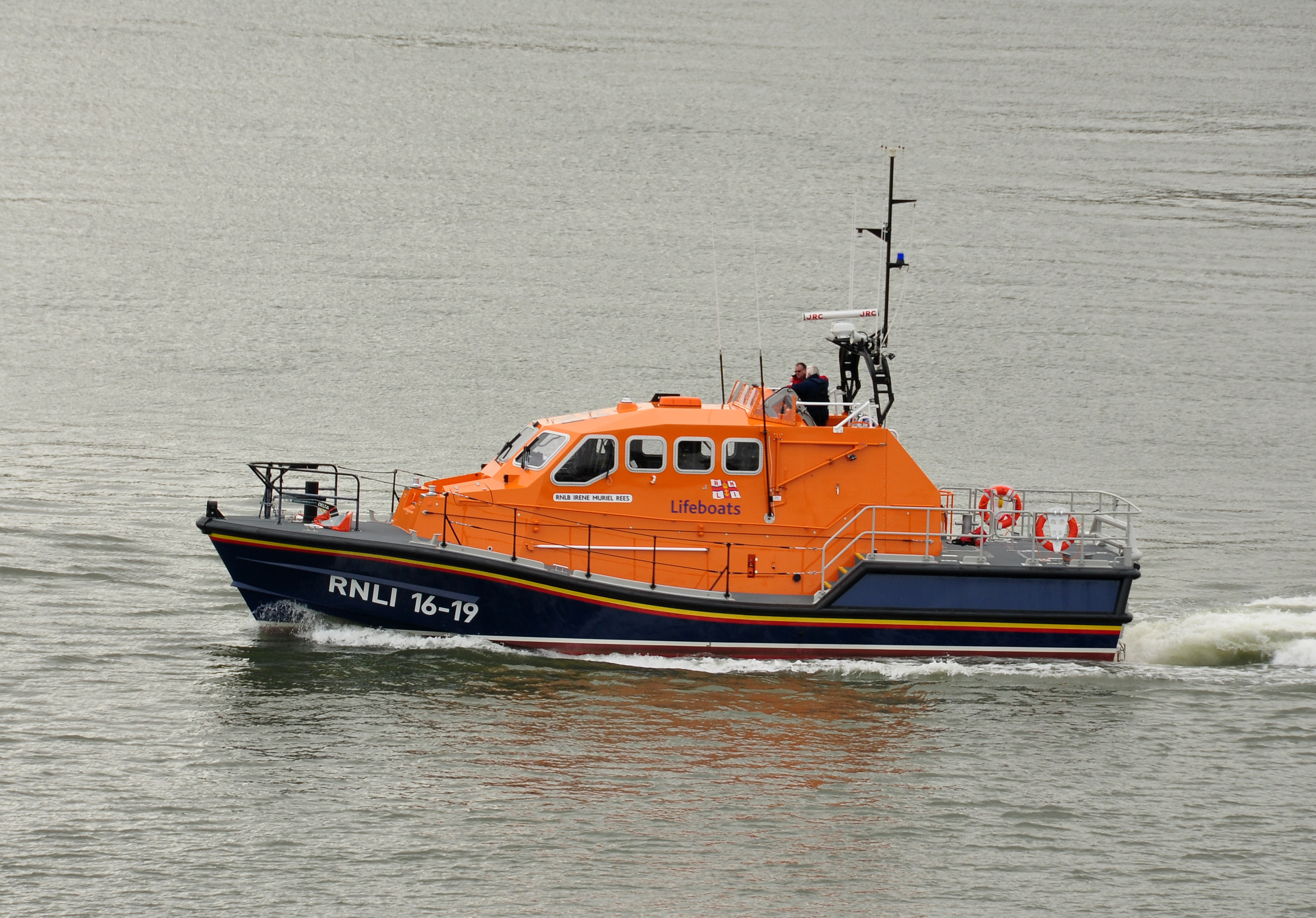
- RNLB 16-19 Irene Muriel Rees (ON 1299)

Class overview
- Name: Tamar class
- Builders: SAR Composites (Builders of hull and superstructure); Babcock International, Marine Division (Fitting-out); Piran Marine (Bond hull & deck together)
- Operators: Royal National Lifeboat Institution
- Preceded by: Tyne
- Cost: £2.6m ($2.91m)
- Built: 2000–2013
- In service: 2006–Present
- Planned: 27
- Building: 0
- Completed: 27
- Active: On Station 22; Relief fleet 4; Assigned 1
- Retired: 1 (Prototype)

General characteristics
- Displacement: 31.5 t (31 long tons)
- Length: 16.3 m (53 ft 6 in)
- Beam: 5.3 m (17 ft 5 in)
- Draught: 1.4 m (4 ft 7 in)
- Propulsion: 2 × Caterpillar C18 diesel engines 1,000 hp (746 kW); 2 × fixed pitch 5-blade propellers; 4,600 litres fuel (1,215 US Gallons)
- Speed: 25 knots (29 mph; 46 km/h)
- Range: 250 nmi (460 km)
- Capacity: 118 (self-righting up to 44)
- Complement: 7

Tamar-class lifeboats are all-weather lifeboats (ALBs) operated by the Royal National Lifeboat Institution (RNLI) around the coasts of Great Britain and Ireland. They have replaced the majority of the older Tyne-class lifeboats. The prototype was built in 2000 and 27 production boats were constructed between 2006 and 2013.

The class name comes from the River Tamar in south west England which flows into the English Channel, where the hulls from SAR Composites were fitted-out by Babcock International Group.

All of the following fleet details are referenced to the 2026 Lifeboat Enthusiast Society Handbook, with information retrieved directly from RNLI records.

== History ==
Since 1982 the RNLI had deployed Tyne lifeboats at stations which launched their boats down slipways or needed to operate in shallow waters. The organisation desired to increase the speed and range of their operations so introduced faster Severn and Trent boats starting in 1994 at locations where they could be moored afloat. The RNLI then needed to produce a boat with similar capabilities but with protected propellers and other modifications that would allow it to be launched on a slipway.

Although nominally the replacement for the Tyne ALBs, only twenty-seven Tamars have been built (compared to forty Tynes). The remaining Tynes will be replaced by Shannon boats.

The prototype Tamar was built in 2000 and was used for trials until 2006. It was sold in December 2008 to Kent Police, becoming Princess Alexandra III, the force's permanent maritime vessel operating out of Sheerness. The first production boat, Haydn Miller entered service at Tenby in March 2006. A few of the early boats suffered problems such as fuel leaking under the floor of the engine room around hydraulic lines. These boats were recalled and the problems rectified.

The 27th and last Tamar-class lifeboat, allocated to The Mumbles, was launched 12 March 2013 in Devonport Dockyard and after sea trials was handed over to the RNLI on 21 May 2013.

Nine lifeboat stations keep Tamars moored afloat, 12 launch them down slipways, and the remaining six form a Relief Fleet, to cover when boats are unavailable due to maintenance. Most of the slipway stations required entirely new boathouses and slipways to accommodate the Tamar, but at Cromer and Angle the existing fairly modern boathouses were adapted and at Sennen Cove the capacious old boathouse was able to be modified to take the new boat. Towards the end of Tamar production, the boathouse building programme fell behind boat delivery dates and the last four boats went on station moored afloat pending boathouse completion, which was not finally achieved until October 2016, when the new St. Davids boathouse was opened.

== Description ==
The Tamar has a new design of crew workstation with seats that can move up and down 20 centimetres (7.9 in) as the boat passes through rough seas at high speed, and a networked computerised Systems and Information Management System (SIMS) which allows the crew to monitor and control the boat entirely from within the wheelhouse. The coxswain and helm have seat-mounted throttles, trackerball and joystick controls of the rudder. Alternatively the boat may be monitored and controlled by two controls on the bridge: Dual throttle controls and joystick on the left; dual throttle, wheel and control-screen on the right. All aspects of the vessel may also be controlled from this position.

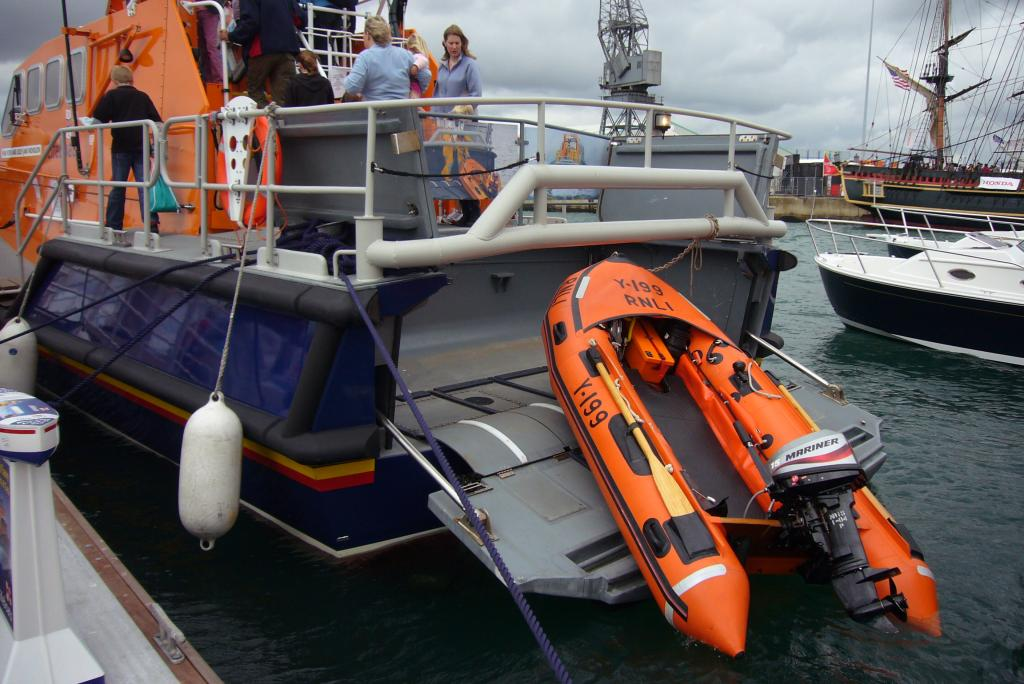
A Y Class inflatable boat on the transom ready to be deployed.

The lifeboat is completely water-tight allowing it to self-right with up to 60 people on board. The boat has the potential to carry a maximum of 120 passengers on board, but without self-righting capability. The Survivors Space has room for 10 sitting and eight standing. The Survivors Space is accessed either through the Wheelhouse or the fore deck Emergency Escape Hatch.

Each Tamar carries a Y Class inflatable boat which can be deployed and recovered while at sea. There is a provision for a PWC (Personal Water Craft, more commonly known as a jetski) to be specified instead, should it prove more suitable.

All Tamar Class lifeboats have sea water sourced open loop heat pump systems on board to keep the crew comfortable in high or low temperature conditions.

== Tamar-class lifeboat fleet ==
=== RNLI active fleet ===
ON (Note: ON is the RNLI's Official Number of the boat.)	Op. No. (Note: Op. No. is the RNLI's Operational Number of the boat carried on the hull.)	Name	Built	In service	Station (Note: (Brackets) used to signify that a boat is assigned to a specific station, but isn't yet at that location)	Launching method	MMSI	Comments
1281	16-02	Haydn Miller	2005	2006–	Tenby	Slipway	235014279	
1282	16-03	The Misses Robertson of Kintail	2006	2006–	Peterhead	Afloat	235030389	
1283	16-04	Spirit of Padstow	2006	2006–	Padstow	Slipway	235030388	
1284	16-05	Helen Comrie	2006	2006–	Longhope	Afloat	235030387	
1287	16-07	Lester	2007	2008–	Cromer	Slipway	235030385	
1288	16-08	Grace Dixon	2007	2008–	Barrow	Slipway	235050564	
1289	16-09	Baltic Exchange III	2008	2008–	Salcombe	Afloat	235050655	
1291	16-11	Mark Mason	2009	2009–	Angle	Slipway	235050567	(Note: From July 2024, based afloat at the Pilot Jetty, Milford Haven.)
1291	16-11	Mark Mason	2009	2009–	Angle	Afloat	235050567	(Note: From July 2024, based afloat at the Pilot Jetty, Milford Haven.)
1292	16-12	George Sullivan	2009	2009–	St Helier	Afloat	235050568	(Note: RNLI crew at St Helier stood down from 17 November 2017 until 12 December 2017.)
1294	16-14	City of London III	2009	2010–	Sennen Cove	Slipway	235050719	
1295	16-15	Enid Collett	2010	2010–	Shoreham Harbour	Slipway	235050721	
1297	16-17	Alfred Albert Williams	2010	2010–	Bembridge	Slipway	235050723	
1298	16-18	Killarney	2010	2010–	Kilmore Quay	Afloat	235050725	
1299	16-19	Irene Muriel Rees	2011	2011–2024	Walton and Frinton	Afloat	235069211	
1299	16-19	Irene Muriel Rees	2011	2024–	Relief fleet	–	235069211	
1299	16-19	Irene Muriel Rees	2011	tbc	Tynemouth	Afloat	235069211	
1300	16-20	Rose	2011	2011–	The Lizard	Slipway	235069212	
1301	16-21	John Buchanan Barr	2011	2011–2024	Portpatrick	Afloat	235069213	
1301	16-21	John Buchanan Barr	2011	2024–2026	Relief fleet	–	235069213	
1301	16-21	John Buchanan Barr	2011	2026–	Fraserburgh	Afloat	235069213	
1302	16-22	Alan Massey	2011	2012–	Baltimore	Afloat	235069214	
1303	16-23	Diamond Jubilee	2012	2012–2022	Eastbourne	Afloat	235069215	(Note: Diamond Jubilee reassigned to Ramsgate, November 2023)
1303	16-23	Diamond Jubilee	2012	2023–	Ramsgate	Afloat	235069215	(Note: Diamond Jubilee reassigned to Ramsgate, November 2023)
1304	16-24	John D Spicer	2012	2012–	Porthdinllaen	Slipway	235069216	
1305	16-25	Kiwi	2012	2013–	Moelfre	Slipway	235069217	
1306	16-26	Norah Wortley	2013	2013–	St Davids	Slipway	235069182	
1307	16-27	Roy Barker IV	2013	2014–	The Mumbles	Slipway	235069218	(Note: September 2023, Mumbles Tamar lifeboat temporarily Afloat)
1307	16-27	Roy Barker IV	2013	2014–	The Mumbles	Afloat	235069218	(Note: September 2023, Mumbles Tamar lifeboat temporarily Afloat)

=== RNLI relief fleet ===
ON	Op. No.	Name	Built	In service	Station	Launching method	MMSI	Comments
1280	16-01	Peter and Lesley-Jane Nicholson	2005	2005–	Relief fleet	–	235014281	
1286	16-06	Frank and Anne Wilkinson	2007	2007–2008	Relief fleet	–	235030386	
1286	16-06	Frank and Anne Wilkinson	2007	2008	Barrow	Slipway	235030386	
1286	16-06	Frank and Anne Wilkinson	2007	2008–	Relief fleet	–	235030386	
1290	16-10	Edward and Barbara Prigmore	2008	2008–2009	Relief fleet	–	235050566	
1290	16-10	Edward and Barbara Prigmore	2008	2009–2010	Sennen Cove	Slipway	235050566	
1290	16-10	Edward and Barbara Prigmore	2008	2010	Relief fleet	–	235050566	
1293	16-13	Victor Freeman	2009	2009–2010	Relief fleet	–	235050627	
1293	16-13	Victor Freeman	2009	2010	Shoreham Harbour	Slipway	235050627	
1293	16-13	Victor Freeman	2009	2010–	Relief fleet	–	235050627	
1296	16-16	Mollie Hunt	2010	2010–2026	Appledore	Afloat	235050722	Withdrawn to the relief fleet, 15 June 2026
1296	16-16	Mollie Hunt	2010	2026–	Relief fleet	Afloat	235050722	Withdrawn to the relief fleet, 15 June 2026

=== RNLI retired fleet ===
ON	Op. No.	Name	Built	In service	Station	Launching method	MMSI	Comments
1251	FS002	Unnamed	2000	2000–2006	Prototype	Afloat	654900000	Sold 2006 to Kent Police, named Princess Alexandra III. In October 2017, a Fisheries Protection Vessel, at Nouadhibou, Mauritania, renamed Lemreye 1.
