= SS Walter L M Russ =

German freighter wrecked in St George's Channel

Coordinates: 51.7308°N 5.4814°W

History
- Name: Walter L M Russ
- Owner: Ernst Russ (1927-45); Ministry of War Transport (1945)
- Port of registry: (Weimar Republic) Hamburg (1927-33); (Nazi Germany) Hamburg (1933-45); (United Kingdom) Hamburg (1945)
- Builder: Neptun AG
- Launched: 1927
- Completed: August 1927
- Identification: Code Letters RGKJ (1927-34); Code Letters DHZG (1933-45)
- Fate: Wrecked 15 July 1945

General characteristics
- Tonnage: 1,538 GRT; 890 NRT
- Length: 246 ft 9 in (75.21 m)
- Beam: 40 ft 1 in (12.22 m)
- Depth: 15 ft 5 in (4.70 m)
- Installed power: Triple expansion steam engine
- Propulsion: Screw propeller

Walter L M Russ was a 1,538 GRT cargo ship built in 1927 in Rostock, Germany. In 1945, she was seized by the Allies and passed to the Ministry of War Transport (MoWT). It was intended that she would be renamed Empire Concourse but in July 1945 she ran aground between Wales and Ireland, and was wrecked.

== Description ==
The ship was built in 1927 by Neptun AG, Rostock, Germany.

The ship was 246 feet 9 inches (75.21 m) long, with a beam of 40 feet 1 inch (12.22 m) a depth of 15 feet 5 inches (4.70 m). She had a GRT of 1,538 and a NRT of 890.

The ship was propelled by a triple expansion steam engine, which had two cylinders of 19 5/16 inches (49.1 cm), 31 1/2 inches (80 cm) and 51 3/16 inches (130.0 cm) diameter by 35 7/16 inches (90.0 cm) stroke. The engine was built by AG Neptun.

== History ==
Walter L M Russ was built for Ernst Russ, Hamburg. The Code Letters RGJK were allocated. In 1934, her Code Letters were changed to DHZG. On 2 March 1936, she was in collision with the German schooner Condor in the Kaiser Wilhelm Canal. The schooner sank.

Walter L M Russ was seized by the Allies in May 1945 at Schleswig in Germany and was passed to the British MoWT. It was intended that she would be renamed Empire Concourse, but on 15 July 1945 she ran aground at Grassholm in St George's Channel and was wrecked. Nine crew were rescued by the Angle Lifeboat, the Elizabeth Elson. James Watkins, the lifeboat's Coxwain, was awarded a RNLI Bronze Medal for his part in the rescue. Walter L M Russ lies in 33 feet (10 m) of water and the site is occasionally used for recreational diving.
