= Foreland Island =

Island in Antarctica

- Location within Antarctica

Geography
- Location: Antarctica
- Coordinates: 61°57′S 57°39′W

Administration
- Administered under the Antarctic Treaty System

Demographics
- Population: Uninhabited

Foreland Island is an island 2 kilometres (1 nmi) east-southeast of Taylor Point, off the east side of King George Island, in the South Shetland Islands. This island was known to sealers as early as 1821 and takes its name from North Foreland, the prominent cape 6 kilometres (3.5 nmi) to the northwest.

== See also ==
- List of antarctic and sub-antarctic islands
