= Taylor Point =

Taylor Point (61°56′S 57°40′W) is a point forming the north limit of Destruction Bay, on the east coast of King George Island in the South Shetland Islands. Named by the United Kingdom Antarctic Place-Names Committee (UK-APC) in 1960 for D. Taylor, Master of the Hobart sealing vessel Caroline, which visited the South Shetland Islands in 1821–22.
