= North and South Foreland =

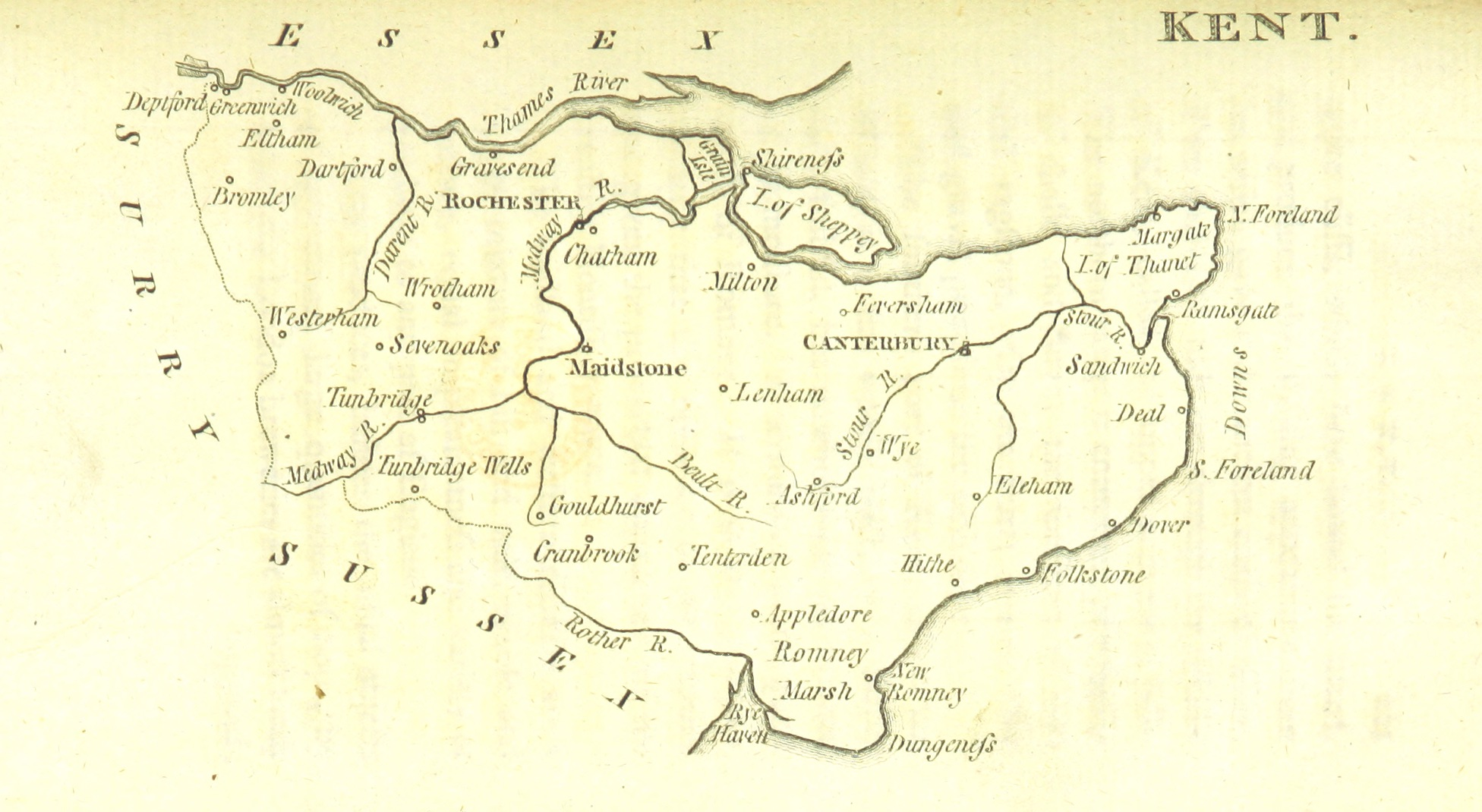
An 1800 map of Kent (N. Foreland and S. Forleand are in the northeast corner)

North Foreland (TR 39860 69616 51°22′30″N 1°26′42″E) and South Foreland (TR 35909 43307 51°08′25″N 1°22′16″E) are two chalk headlands on the Kent coast of southeast England.

See:

- North Foreland
- South Foreland
