= Foreland, Isle of Wight =

Promontory on the Isle of Wight, England

Coordinates: 50°41′10″N 1°04′12″W

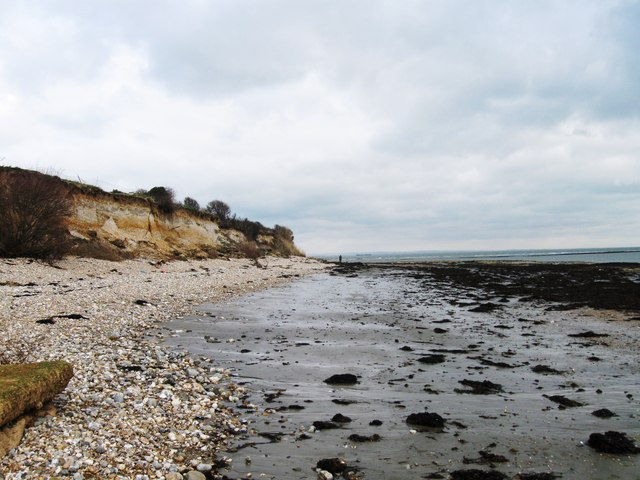
The beach at Foreland

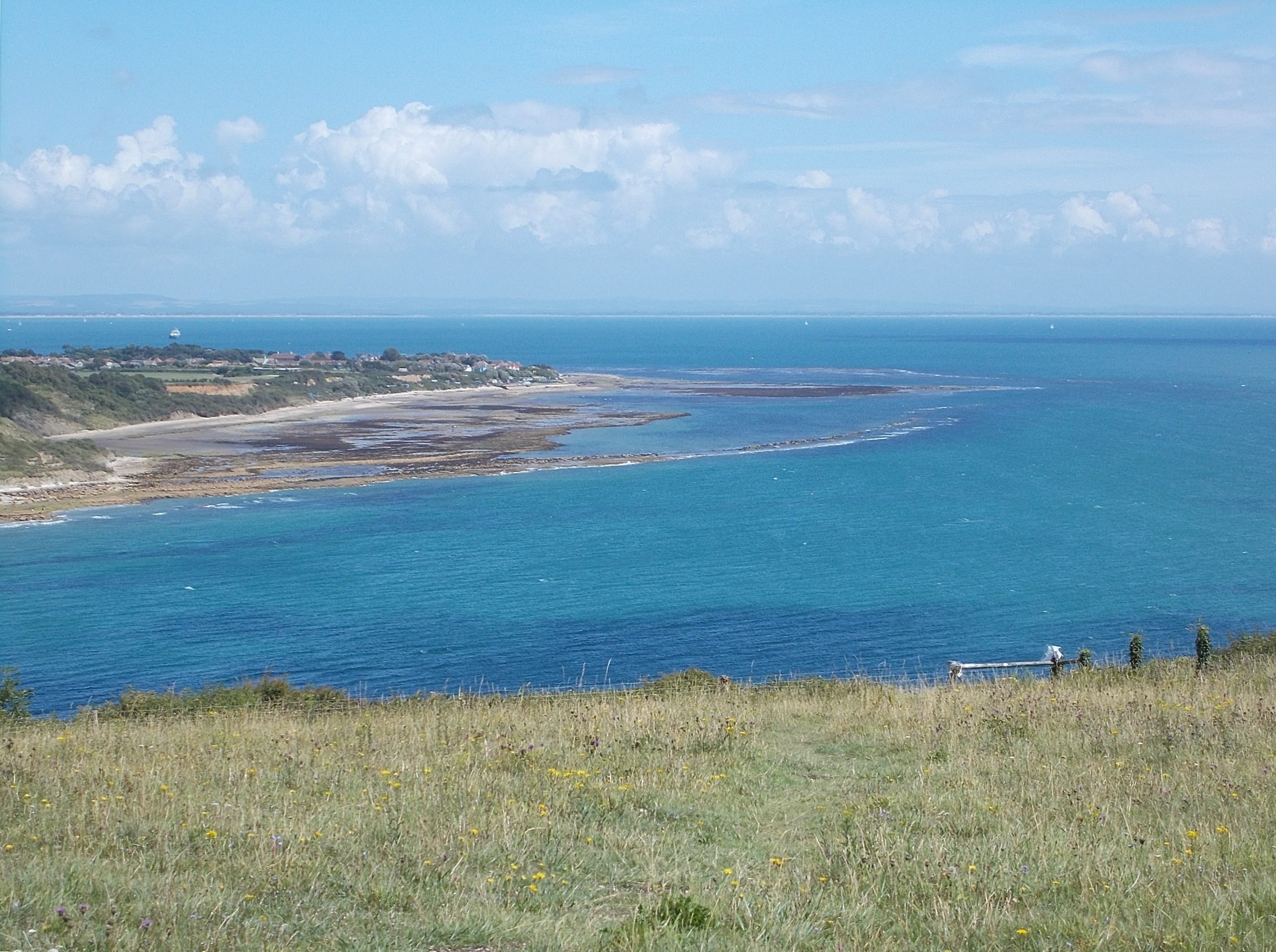
View of Forelands and the Bembridge ledge from Culver Down, with the mainland in the far distance

Foreland or Forelands, and the adjacent Foreland Fields, is the easternmost point of the Isle of Wight, part of the village of Bembridge. It is located about 6.5 miles due south of the city of Portsmouth on the British mainland, separated by the eastern reaches of the Solent. It is characterised by a pub called the Crab and Lobster Inn and various beach huts plus a beach cafe and a coast guard lookout. In the sea are the reefs of Bembridge Ledge which is rich in edible crabs, lobsters and spider crabs and shoals of mackerel. In the Crab & Lobster Inn are photographs of the many shipwrecks, which included the submarine HMS Alliance, now a museum ship at Gosport and the First World War troopship the S.S. Mehndi carrying troops from South Africa, with great loss of life.

Foreland Fields includes Bembridge ledge, an area formerly popular with shipwrecks and smuggling, but also for crab and lobster fishing; there is a Coastguard Station. The channel through the interior of the Bembridge Ledges is known as "Dickie Dawes Gut" after a notorious local smuggler (and father of the courtesan Sophie Dawes) due to his feat of escaping the excise men by superior local navigational knowledge. There was a pillbox built in the Second World War, now subsumed in the sea defences. The beach is sandy with stones which contain Cretaceous fossils. The cliffs also feature Horsetails ferns.

== Name ==
First recorded as East Foreland on a 1591 map, it is from Middle English forelande 'a cape, a headland, a coastal promontory'. The name is also found in other parts of the U.K.
