= Shoreham Harbour Lifeboat Station =

RNLI lifeboat station in West Sussex, England

- Shoreham Harbour Lifeboat Station in 2026

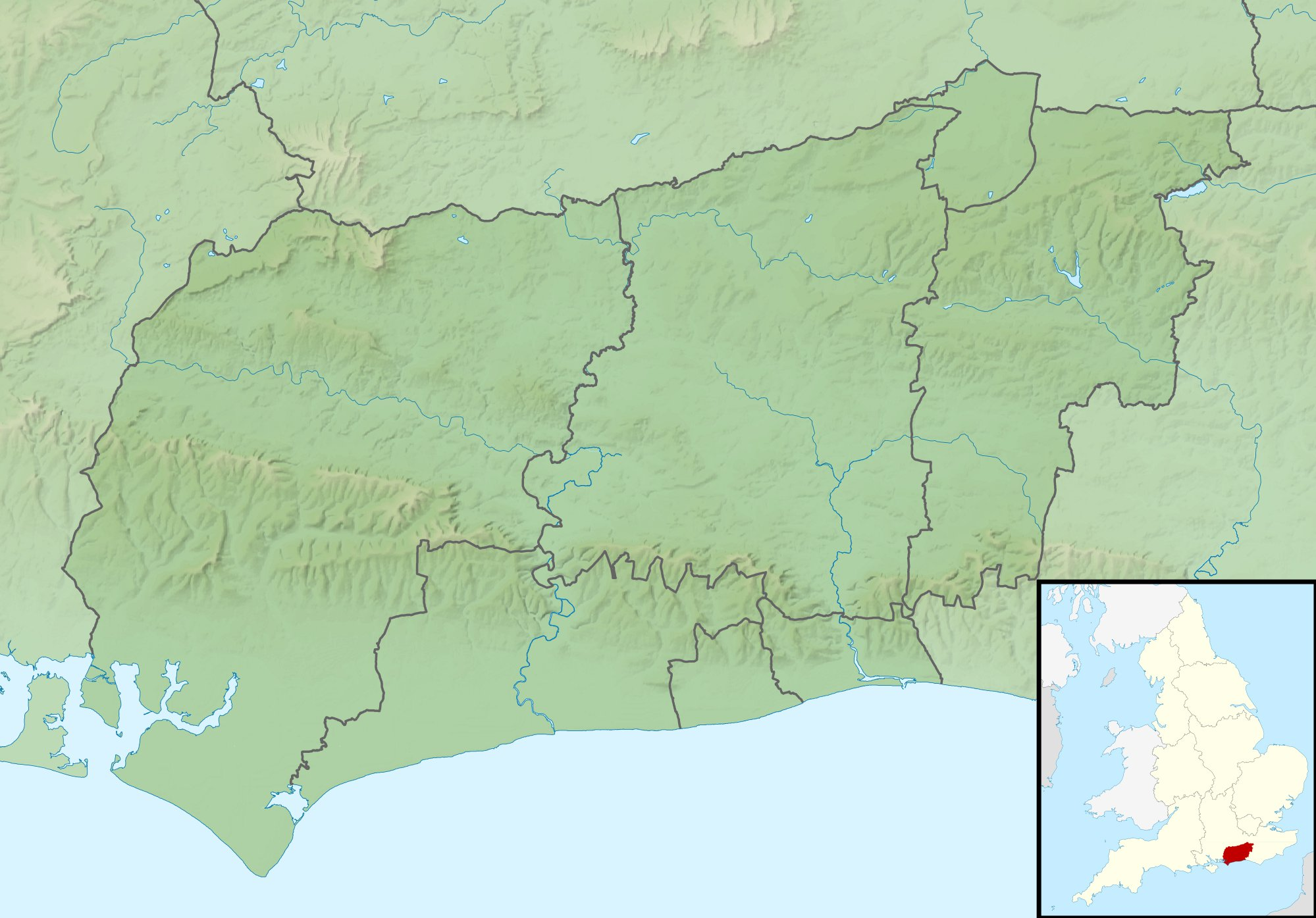
- Location within West Sussex
- Former names: Shoreham Lifeboat Station

General information
- Type: RNLI Lifeboat Station
- Architectural style: Super-structure of timber framed engineered Glued-laminated Beams
- Location: Brighton Road, Shoreham-by-Sea, West Sussex, BN43 6RN, England
- Coordinates: 50°49′49.1″N 0°14′56.6″W
- Opened: 1845–1924; 1929–present
- Owner: Royal National Lifeboat Institution

Technical details
- Material: Concrete, brick, block and Steel

Website
- Shoreham Harbour RNLI Lifeboat Station

Shoreham Harbour Lifeboat Station is located at the mouth of the River Adur, on Brighton Road, in Shoreham-by-Sea (Shoreham), a town approximately 5 miles (8.0 km) west of Brighton, overlooking the English Channel, in the English county of West Sussex.

A lifeboat was first placed at Shoreham by the Harbour Commissioners in 1845, with management of the station being transferred to the Royal National Lifeboat Institution (RNLI) in 1865.

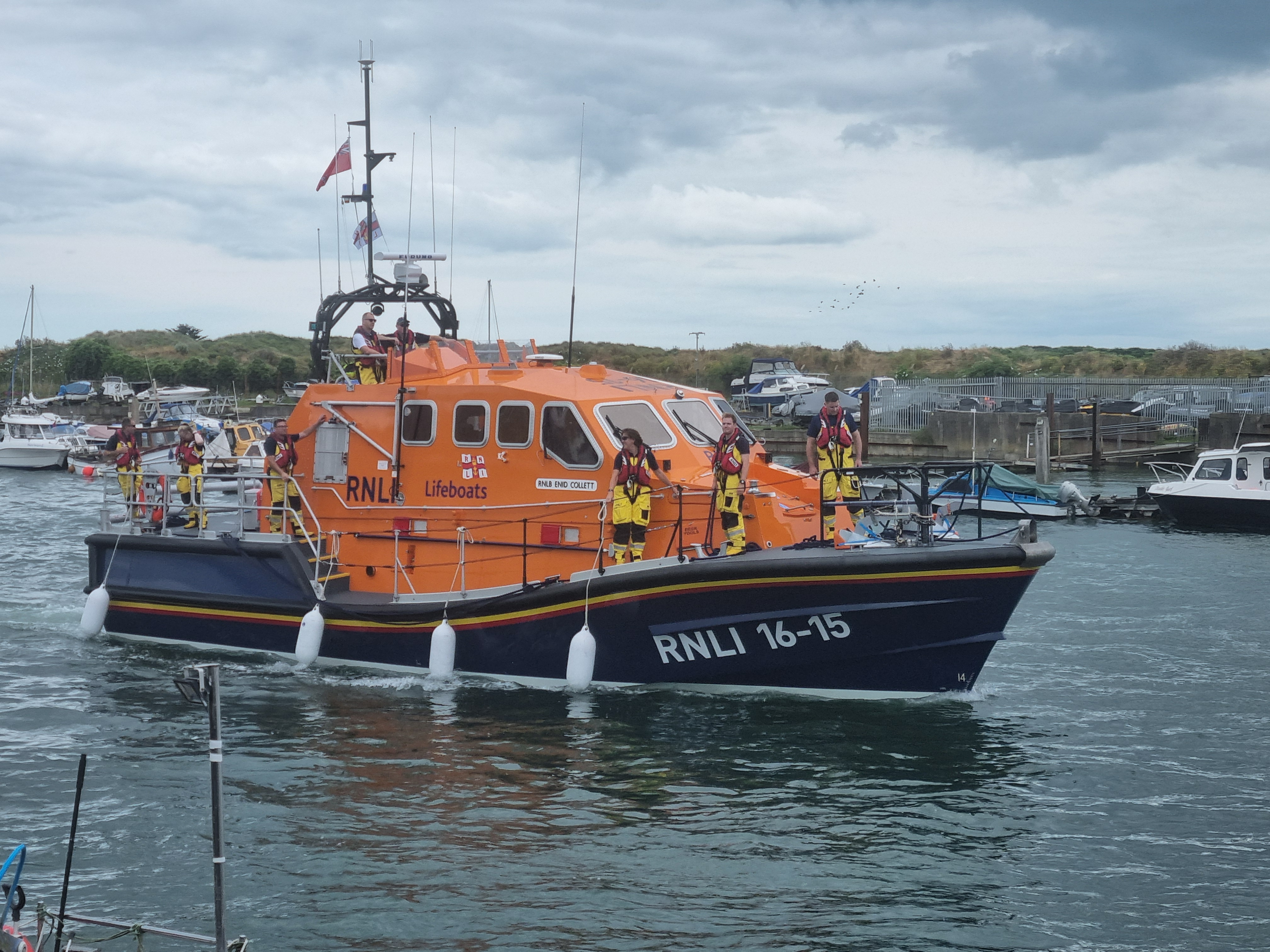
Shoreham Harbour Tamar-class All-weather lifeboat 16-15 Enid Collett (ON 1295)

The station operates two lifeboats, the Tamar-class All-weather lifeboat Enid Collett (ON 1295), on station since 2010, and the much smaller D-class (IB1) Inshore lifeboat Jandy (D-918), on station since 2026.

== History ==
Ever since its founding in 1824, the Royal National Institution for the Preservation of Life from Shipwreck (RNIPLS), later to become the RNLI in 1854, would award medals for deeds of gallantry at sea, even if no lifeboats were involved. On 13 January 1843, the smack Prince Regent, was on passage from London to Portsmouth, when she stranded at Copperas Gap. A line was thrown from the vessel, and a coastguard attached himself to the line, then being dragged through the surf to the vessel. He then assisted the crew of five to be rescued by Breeches buoy. Abraham Young, Chief Boatman of H.M. Coastguard at Fishersgate, was awarded the RNIPLS Silver Medal.

In 1845 the Shoreham Harbour Commissioners established a lifeboat service. A 30 ft (9.1 m) lifeboat costing £100 was provided. Records show that two lives were saved.

In 1865, management of the station was transferred to the RNLI, and Shoreham Lifeboat Station was fully refurbished. A new boathouse was constructed on Kingston beach, at a cost of £133-10s-0d, and a new 33 ft (10 m) self-righting 'Pulling and Sailing' (P&S) lifeboat, one with sails and (10) oars, was also provided, which was transported to the station free of charge by the London, Brighton and South Coast Railway. The lifeboat was funded from the gift of £300 from Miss Robertson of London, and at a service on 1 November 1865, the lifeboat was named Ramonet (ON 212) in accordance with her wishes.

In 1870, the Harbour Board funded the installation of a slipway.

On 16 December 1874, the Ramonet capsized, while on a training exercise in rough weather and heavy seas. Crewman Robert Brazier drowned. A local customs officer swam out to attempt to assist, and was awarded the RNLI Silver Medal.

The 1865 boathouse was used until 1892, when a new timber-framed boathouse was built on the western side of the harbour, and the old station building was demolished. In 1903, the boathouse was moved further from the shore.

The station was closed in October 1924, as silt deposits in the harbour entrance had created a sandbar, rendering operations impossible.

=== 1929–1941: New station and World War II rescues ===
After work had been carried out to remove the sandbar, the station re-opened in October 1929. In 1933 the station moved to Kingston Beach opposite Shoreham Harbour. A new boathouse and slipway were built to accommodate the new 41-foot Watson-class lifeboat, Rosa Woodd and Phyllis Lunn (ON 758). The station would be known as Shoreham Harbour Lifeboat Station.

During World War II, Rosa Woodd and Phyllis Lunn took part in the Dunkirk evacuation, crewed by Royal Navy men, instead of the lifeboat crew. She was towed to Dunkirk on 1 June 1940 by naval drifter Kindred Star. During the evacuation she made three trips from the beaches back to Dover.

On 16 November 1941, the Royal Navy minesweeper President Briand suffered engine trouble whilst along the coast off Shoreham. Strong wind along with heavy seas were threatening to push the vessel onto the shore. Rosa Woodd and Phyllis Lunn was launched to assist, and stood by the ship until 21:30, at which time the tug SS Goole arrived and relieved the lifeboat. The coxswain of the Rosa Woodd and Phyllis Lunn returned to the President Briand aboard the Shoreham Pilot Cutter to pilot the minesweeper. At 21:45, the lifeboat was recalled to service as both the tug and the minesweeper were being driven ashore by the high winds. The tow line broke and the minesweeper rolled heavily, waves breaking over her decks. Avoiding the presence of the naval mines in the vicinity, the lifeboat went alongside multiple times and removed all 22 men from the minesweeper, including their own coxswain. Two lifeboat crewmen received RNLI medals for their participation in the rescue.

Beginning early on 8 August 1948, a strong gale was blowing with rough seas and a heavy swell, shredding the sails of the yacht Gull and driving her out of control off the coast at Shoreham. Rosa Woodd and Phyllis Lunn was launched to assist, hoisting her sail to give her engines enough speed to catch the yacht. The lifeboat eventually caught the yacht at the entrance to Newhaven Harbour, where she had become waterlogged and caught in shallow water. The lifeboat got alongside her and rescued all six people aboard. For this service the coxswain received the RNLI Silver Medal.

=== 1963–1990: Refurbishment and Tyne-class lifeboat ===
In 1963, Rosa Woodd and Phyllis Lunn was retired and replaced by the Dorothy and Philip Constant (ON 967). In 1967, the station was supplied with a second lifeboat. This was a D-class (RFD PB16) Inshore lifeboat (D-147), and was kept in its own berth constructed beneath the main boathouse.

From 16 to 19 October 1971, the drilling rig William Allpress was anchored three-quarters of a mile off the coast near Rustington awaiting a tow, in deteriorating weather. The rig's five crew were unable to eat or sleep in the rough weather, and needed rescue. The Dorothy and Philip Constant was launched at 14:10; the seas were rough and torrential rain made visibility extremely limited. The life-boat crew were able to pull the rig's crew on board across the foredeck to safety. Coxswain John Fox was awarded an RNLI Bronze Medal.

On 5 August 1973, the yacht Albin Ballard was drifting with wrecked sails owing to heavy seas and gale-force winds. The Dorothy and Philip Constant was launched at 03:15, and found the yacht due south of Littlehampton, deluged with large waves, and with a seasick, exhausted crew. Two of the lifeboat's crew boarded the yacht and set up a towline, bringing her safely into Shoreham at 07:25. Coxswain John Fox was awarded a second RNLI Bronze Medal.

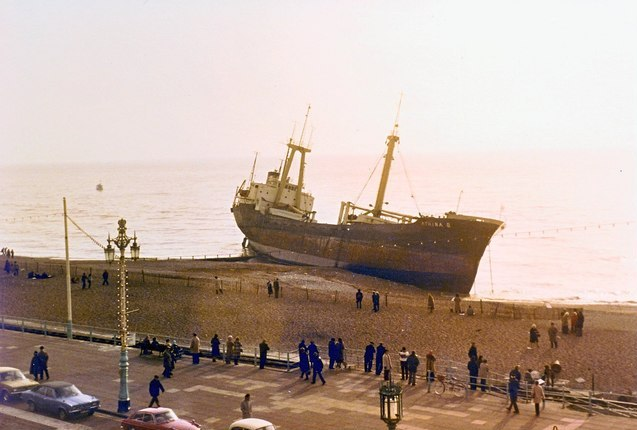
The Athina B, aground to the east of the Palace Pier in Brighton

On 20 January 1980, the MS Athina B arrived at Shoreham-by-Sea from the Azores archipelago. During the voyage, she had problems with her generator, gyro compass and radar, and put in at La Rochelle in France for repairs. On arrival at Shoreham, the vessel was caught in gale force seven or eight winds, and with seas breaking across her decks, she was unable to enter. Her engines failed, and a Mayday call was issued. The Dorothy and Philip Constance was launched to service at 08:40, and rescued half the crew, as well as the captain's family. The lifeboat returned the next day to rescue the remaining crew. Coxswain Kenneth Voice was awarded the RNLI Silver Medal.

In 1981, sinkage of the slipway led to the allocation of a 13-ton Rother-class lifeboat, primarily designed for carriage launching. The slipway was strengthened following the decision to place a Tyne-class boat on station. The Rother was replaced in 1986 by the first of two 47-foot Watson-class lifeboats, that served for four years, before being replaced by the new Tyne.

In 1990 the new Tyne-class lifeboat Hermione Lady Colwyn (ON 1158) arrived at Shoreham. She was on station until 2010. A succession of relief fleet Tynes then followed, until the new Tamar-class lifeboat entered service in December 2010.

=== 2008 onwards ===
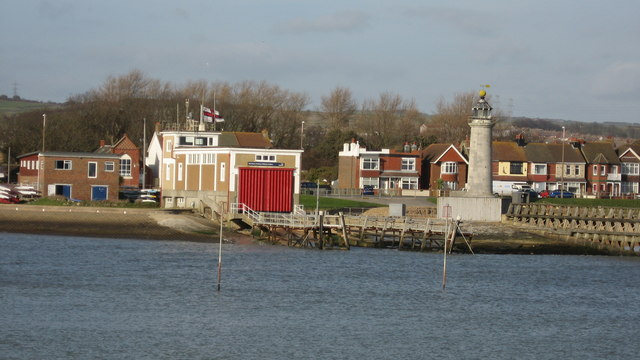
1933 Lifeboat House

In 2008, a £1 million public appeal was launched, to partially fund another rebuild, this time to accommodate a new Tamar-class lifeboat. In January 2009, the old 1933 station boathouse, and slipway, was demolished, and the station was temporarily housed on Kingston Beach. The new building is timber-framed on three storeys, has boat halls for both the All-weather and Inshore lifeboats, and dedicated slipways. The previous boathouse and station encountered occasional problems with flooding due to high spring tides and waves. To eliminate this problem, a wave pit was created at the front of the lifeboat house, to help dissipate the energy of storm waves racing across the open harbour mouth to the slipway.

The project cost a total of £4.2 million, and was officially opened by The Duke of Kent on 16 June 2011. The £2.7 million Tamar-class All-weather lifeboat Enid Collett (ON 1295) arrived at the station on 10 December 2010, so named after Enid Collett of Great Shelford, Cambridgeshire, whose legacy primarily funded the lifeboat.

== Station honours ==
The following are awards made at Shoreham Harbour:

- RNIPLS Silver Medal
  Abraham Young, Chief Boatman, H.M. Coastguard, Fishersgate – 1843
- RNLI Silver Medal
  William Tolladay G. Sheader, Examining Officer, H.M. Customs – 1875
  James Thomas Upperton, Second Coxswain – 1941
  James Thomas Upperton, Coxswain – 1948 (Second-service clasp)
  Kenneth Frederick David Voice, Coxswain – 1980
- RNLI Bronze Medal
  Henry Philcox, Motor Mechanic – 1941
  John Alfred Fox, Coxswain – 1972
  John Alfred Fox, Coxswain – 1973 (Second-service clasp)
- 'The Thanks of the Institution inscribed on Vellum'
  Henry Philcox, Motor Mechanic – 1948
  Ken L. Everard, Assistant Mechanic – 1972
  Ken Everard, Assistant Mechanic – 1973
  Geoff Tugwell, crew member – 1973
  John Alfred Fox, Coxswain – 1973
  Michael Fox, Helm of the D-class lifeboat – 1977
  Kenneth Everard, Second Coxswain – 1980
  Jack Silverson, Motor Mechanic – 1980
  Michael Fox, Assistant Mechanic – 1980
  Geoff Tugwell, Emergency Mechanic – 1980
  John Landale, Emergency Mechanic – 1980
  Peter Huxtable, crew member – 1980
  Peter Huxtable, Coxswain – 1999
- 'A Framed Letter of Thanks signed by the Chairman of the Institution'
  Coxswain and Crew – 1968
  Peter Huxstable, Coxswain – 2001
  Steve Smith, Deputy Second Coxswain – 2012
  Simon Tugwell, crew member – 2012
- Member, Order of the British Empire (MBE)
  Peter Ronald Huxtable, Coxswain – 2005NYH
- British Empire Medal
  Henry Philcox, Second Coxswain and Motor Mechanic – 1971NYH
  Andrew Peter Morgan, Visits Officer and Water Safety Volunteer – 2021QBH

== Roll of honour ==
In memory of those lost whilst serving at Shoreham Harbour:

- Drowned when the lifeboat capsized on exercise, 16 December 1874.
  Robert Brazier, crew member (39)

== Shoreham Harbour lifeboats ==
=== Shoreham Harbour Commissioners ===
ON (Note: ON is the RNLI's Official Number of the boat.)	Name	Built	On station	Class	Comments
–	Unknown	1845	1845–1865	30-foot Liverpool (P&S)	(Note: 30 ft 0 in (9.14 m) x 8 ft 9 in (2.67 m) (12-oared) Liverpool-class lifeboat, funded by Harbour Dues, operated by the Shoreham harbour Commissioners, costing £100.)

=== Pulling and Sailing (P&S) lifeboats ===
ON	Name	Built	On station	Class	Comments
212	Ramonet	1865	1865–1890	33-foot Peake self-righting (P&S)	(Note: 33 ft 0 in (10.06 m) x 8 ft 2 in (2.49 m) (10-oared) Peake-class self-righting (P&S) lifeboat, gift of Miss Robertson of London, built by Forrestt of Limehouse, London, costing £283.); Capsized 16 December 1874. Sold in 1890.
276	William Restell	1890	1890–1903	34-foot self-righting (P&S)	(Note: 34 ft 0 in (10.36 m) x 7 ft 6 in (2.29 m) (10-oared) self-righting (P&S) lifeboat, legacy of Mr W. T. Restell of London, built by Woolfe of Shadwell, London, costing £428.); Broken up in 1903.
532	William Restell	1904	1904–1924	35-foot self-righting (P&S)	(Note: 35 ft 0 in (10.67 m) x 8 ft 6 in (2.59 m) (10-oared) self-righting (P&S) lifeboat, legacy of Mr W. Restell and gift of Mr T. M. Restell, built by Thames Ironworks of Blackwall, London, costing £803.); Sold in 1925.

Station closed, 1924–1929

=== Motor lifeboats ===
ON	Op.No. (Note: Op.No. is the RNLI's Operational Number of the boat carried on the hull.)	Name	Built	On station	Class	Comments
651	–	Samuel Oakes	1918	1929–1933	40-foot Watson	Previously at Humber and Weymouth.
560	–	Maria	1909	1931	40-foot Watson	Previously at Broughty Ferry, Portpatrick and Pwllheli.
758	–	Rosa Woodd and Phyllis Lunn	1932	1933–1963	41-foot Watson	Transferred to the Relief fleet.
967	–	Dorothy and Philip Constant	1962	1963–1981	42-foot Watson	Transferred to Oban.
1064	37-39	The Davys Family	1981	1981–1986	Rother	Transferred to the Relief fleet.
953	–	Sarah Jane and James Season	1960	1986–1988	47-foot Watson	Previously at Teesmouth.
971	–	Joseph Soar (Civil Service No.34)	1963	1988–1990	47-foot Watson	Previously at St Davids and Dunbar.
1158	47-040	Hermione Lady Colwyn	1990	1990–2010	Tyne	Last Tyne built.
1295	16-15	Enid Collett	2010	2010–	Tamar	

More post-service details can be found on the respective lifeboat class pages.

=== Inshore lifeboats ===
Op.No.	Name	On station	Class	Comments
D-147	Unnamed	1967–1970	D-class (RFD PB16)	
D-162	Unnamed	1970–1978	D-class (RFD PB16)	
D-264	Unnamed	1979–1987	D-class (RFD PB16)	
D-351	Rotary Club of Sutton	1987–1994	D-class (EA16)	
D-435	Table 32	1995–1996	D-class (EA16)	
D-501	Forest Row Choir	1996–2005	D-class (EA16)	
D-647	Barry Lazell	2005–2015	D-class (IB1)	
D-784	Joan Woodland	2015–	D-class (IB1)	
D-918	Jandy	tbc	D-class (IB1)	

== Gallery ==
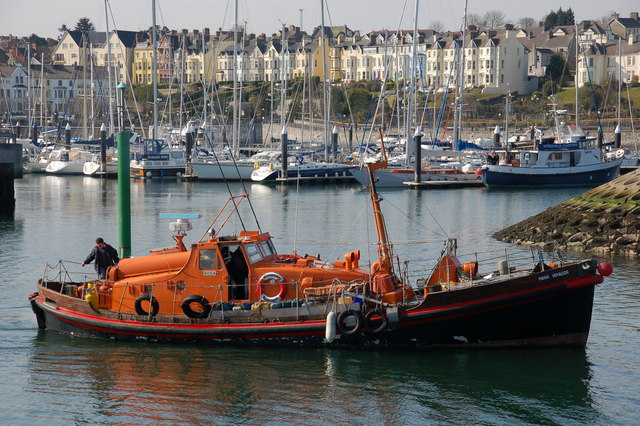
Former Shoreham lifeboat Sarah Jane and James Season (ON 953)

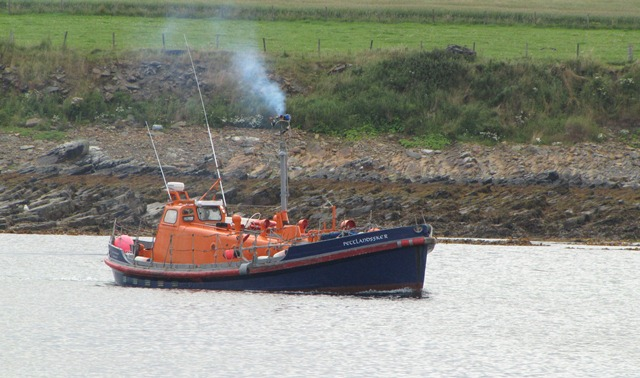
The ex Shoreham lifeboat Dorothy and Philip Constant (ON 967). Now called Pettlandssker and used for sight seeing to the Pentland Skerries, Scotland

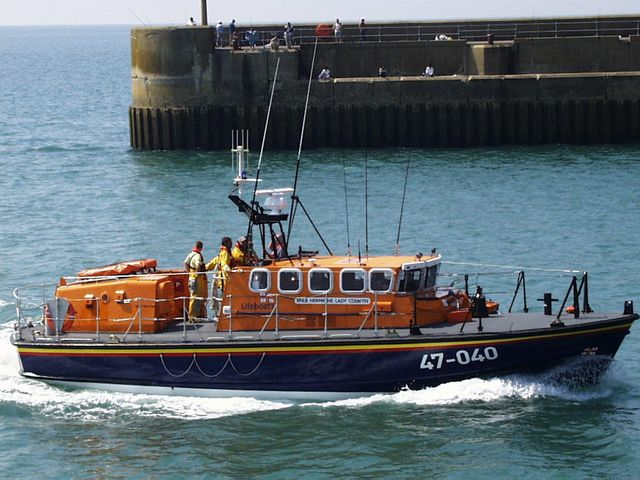
The Shoreham lifeboat Hermione Lady Colwyn (ON 1158) which served at the station from 30 September 1990 to April 2010

== See also ==
- List of RNLI stations
- List of former RNLI stations
- Royal National Lifeboat Institution lifeboats
