= Elvian School =

Coordinates: 51.4457°N 1.0000°W

The Elvian School
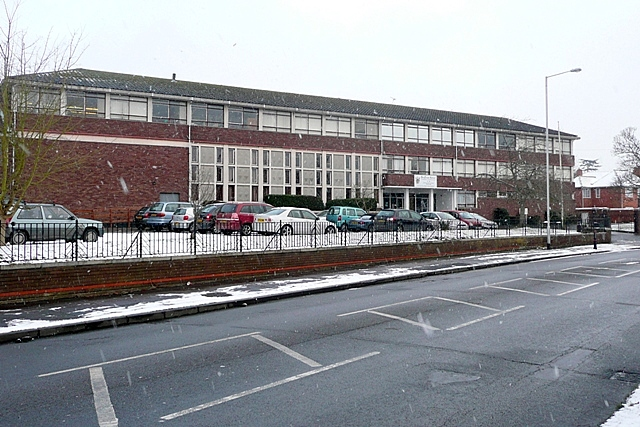
- Elvian School from Southcote Lane

Location
- 63 Bath Road; Reading; Berkshire, RG30 2BB; England

Information
- Former name: Presentation College
- Type: Private school
- Established: 1931 (as Presentation College); 2004 (as Elvian School)
- Closed: 2010
- Department for Education URN: 110113 Tables
- Gender: Mixed
- Age: 3 to 18
- Website: http://www.elvian.reading.sch.uk/

The Elvian School was a private school in Reading, Berkshire, United Kingdom run by the Licensed Trade Charity as a co-educational, non-denominational Christian school. It was previously the Roman Catholic boys' school Presentation College, Reading, until it went into administration in 2004. In March 2010 it was announced that the school would close at the end of the academic year.

== History ==
The school opened in 1931 as Presentation College, Reading, an independent boys' day school run by the Presentation Brothers. In May 2003, the Presentation Brothers made the highly controversial decision to close the school the following summer. However, due to the "Save Pres" campaign by staff and students, the Presentation Brothers reversed the decision and the school was transferred to a trust. However, in mid-2004 the school went into administration and was taken over by the Licensed Trade Charity and became the Elvian School. The final headteacher of the school was Paul Bevis.

== Closure ==
In January 2010, staff and parents of pupils were sent letters stating that the future of Elvian School was unclear and that the feasibility of continuing to operate was being considered during a consultation period. On 3 March, a further letter and announcement by the school's director of education, Ian Mullins, stated that the consultation had unanimously agreed that the school could not run into the 2010/11 academic year. The school closed in July 2010.

== Rebirth ==
In 2013 members of the West Reading Education Network WREN announced plans to open a Free School on the site of the former Elvian School, re-using some of the Elvian school buildings. These plans were delayed while developers Taylor Wimpey agreed to purchase the site subject to obtaining planning permission for 182 homes. Planning permission was refused. Taylor Wimpey appealed the refusal, and their appeal was dismissed in December 2013 after a public enquiry. Taylor Wimpey appealed to the High Court for a judicial review of the refusal, which was dismissed in June 2014. The new school opened with the name "The Wren School" in 2015.

== Notable former pupils ==
=== Old Presentonians ===
- Michael Bond (1926–2017), children's author.
- Jonathan Bowden (1962–2012), political activist and orator.
- Gerard Johnson (born 1963), rock musician.
- Joseph Anthony Kelly (born 1958), newspaper editor and theologian.
- Cormac Murphy-O'Connor (1932–2017), Roman Catholic cardinal.
- Mike Oldfield (born 1953), rock musician.
- Lawrie Sanchez (born 1959), football player and manager.
- Damian Thompson (born 1962), journalist and author.

== See also ==
- Licensed Victuallers' School
