= Imperial Court, Kennington =

Building in London, England

Imperial Court

General information
- Architectural style: neoclassical
- Location: London, England
- Coordinates: 51°29′13″N 0°06′45″W
- Completed: 1835–1836

Design and construction
- Architects: H. and E. Rose

Listed Building – Grade II
- Official name: Imperial Court
- Designated: 27 March 1981
- Reference no.: 1080422

Imperial Court is a Grade II listed building at 225 Kennington Lane, Kennington, in the London Borough of Lambeth.

== History and description ==
The building was built in 1836 for the Licensed Victuallers' Company School (now the Licensed Trade Charity). The foundation stone was laid by Viscount Melbourne in the name of King William IV, patron of the school.

It was designed by architect Henry Rose in a grand neoclassical style, reflecting the widespread elevation of higher education among the middle class. It is built of stock brick with white stucco accents, with a grande central portico and pediment. The building is Grade II listed and part of the Kennington Conservation Area, its position forming a terminating vista with the view from the street's junction with Kennington Road.

The school eventually left in 1922 following the advancement of London and industrialisation into the area, moving to Slough. The building then served as the headquarters of the Navy, Army and Air Force Institute, being renamed to Imperial Court, until 1992 when it was converted for residential use.
