= Morecambe Lifeboat Station =

RNLI lifeboat station in Lancashire, England

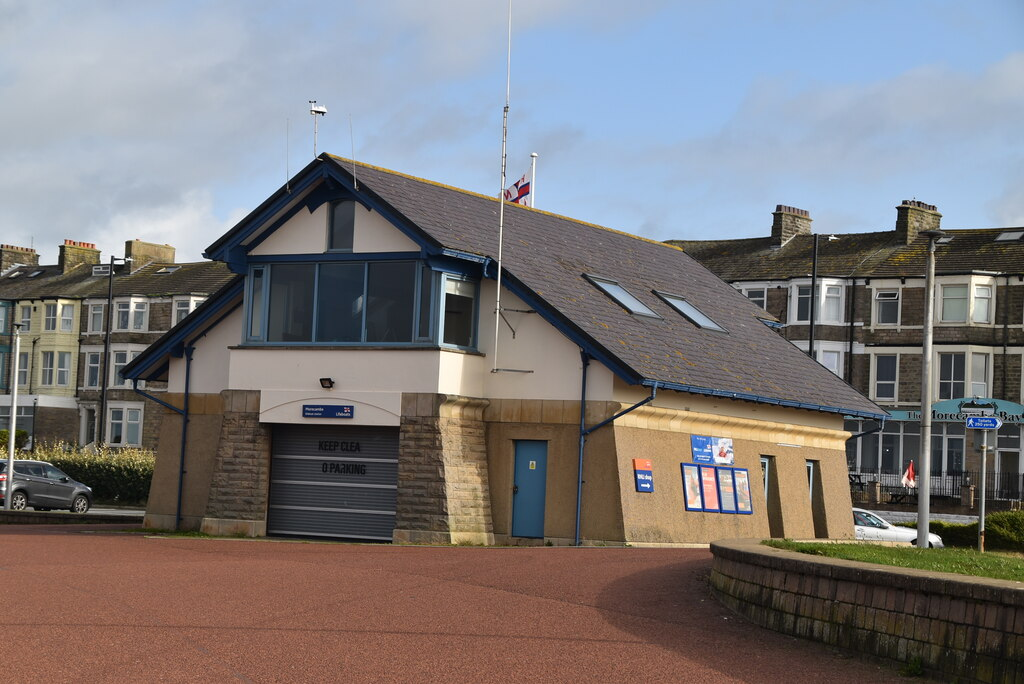
- Morecambe Inshore Lifeboat Station in 2023

- Location within Lancashire

General information
- Type: RNLI Lifeboat Station
- Location: Marine Road Central, Morecambe, Lancashire, LA4 5BY, England
- Coordinates: 54°04′30.4″N 2°51′48.9″W
- Opened: May 1966
- Owner: Royal National Lifeboat Institution

Website
- Morecambe RNLI Lifeboat Station

Morecambe Lifeboat Station actually comprises two stations, located on the promenade in Morecambe, a seaside town situated on the Morecambe Bay estuary, on the north Lancashire coast.

An Inshore lifeboat was first stationed at Morecambe by the Royal National Lifeboat Institution (RNLI) in 1966. In 2002, a hovercraft was also placed at a second station.

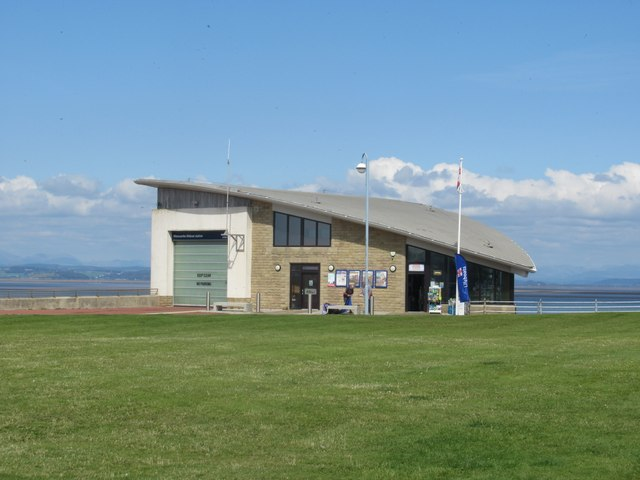
Morecambe RNLI Hovercraft Station

The station currently operates a D-class (IB1) Inshore lifeboat, Brenda Raworth (D-855), on station since 2021, and a modified Griffon Type 470TD Hovercraft, The Hurley Flyer (H-002), on station since 2002.

== History ==
In 1964, in response to an increasing amount of water-based leisure activity, the RNLI placed 25 small fast Inshore lifeboats around the country. These were easily launched with just a few people, ideal to respond quickly to local emergencies.

More stations were opened, and in May 1966, a lifeboat station was established at Morecambe, with the arrival of a D-class (RFD PB16) Inshore lifeboat, the unnamed (D-93).

In rough seas, and a south west gale, on 5 August 1973, two men were spotted in a small dinghy on the Clark Wharf Sandbank, 1/2 mile (0.80 km) north west of Heysham Harbour. Unable to get close, Helm Keith Willacy went over the side with a lifeline. Attempts to reach the men failed, so he then anchored the D-class lifeboat, veered down, and the men were brought to safety. For this service, Helm Willacy was awarded the RNLI Bronze Medal, whilst crew member Andrew Jarvis was accorded "The Thanks of the Institution inscribed on Vellum".

Just nine years later, on 18 October 1982, a second medal service was carried out at Morecambe. The lifeboat was called to a windsurfer in trouble in Half Moon Bay, in a south east gale. After a search in demanding conditions, with waves eight to nine feet high, requiring considerable boat handling skills, the man was located 40 feet (12 m) up a concrete marker pillar. Having tied his board to the ladder, access up or down was impossible, and the man eventually jumped into the sea to be rescued. Helm Keith Willacy was awarded the RNLI Silver Medal, with "The Thanks of the Institution inscribed on Vellum" awarded to crew members Anthony Terence Jolley and Robert Alan Coyle.

A new boathouse, with improved crew facilities, and retail space for a souvenir shop, was constructed on Marine Road Central in 1998.

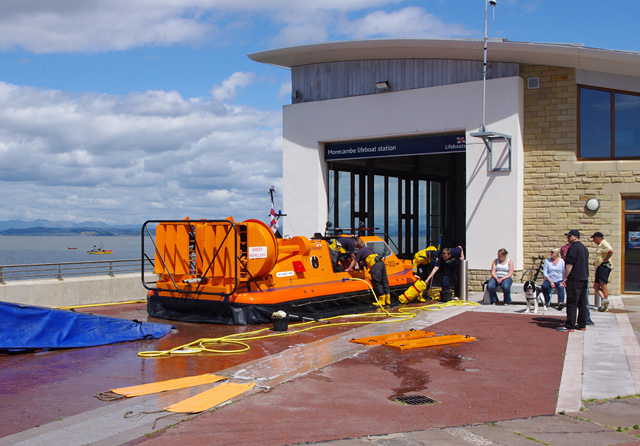
H-002 Hurley Flyer at Morecambe

After preliminary trials in 2001 proved satisfactory, and following further tests at Poole, Flint, Southend-on-Sea and Hunstanton, it was decided to place the first RNLI Hovercraft at Morecambe. The location was chosen primarily due to the extensive and dangerous mud-flats and quick-sand, which extend across Morecambe bay at low tide.

The hovercraft became operational on 23 December 2002, and at a ceremony in 2003, was named Hurley Flyer (H-002), having been funded by Mrs Kay Hurley of Oxfordshire.

On the night of 5 February 2004, to highlight the dangers encountered in the area, tragedy struck Morecambe Bay. Emergency services were alerted by a desperate call made to 999 by Guo Binglong. A large group of 30 Chinese cockle pickers were caught out by the sands and the tide. The cocklers were under the direction of illegal gang masters who were compelling them to work in these dangerous conditions, for little pay, with no regard for their safety. In 2006, the group's gangmaster was found guilty of manslaughter, and jailed for 14 years. Lifeboat crews made every effort to save lives, but 23 people drowned, including Guo Binglong, and the main task ended up recovering bodies. A "Framed letter of thanks signed by the chairman of the Institution", Mr Peter Nicholson, was awarded to John Beaty, lifeboat operations manager, with a second letter to all the crew and shore helpers.

Temporary facilities for the Hovercraft had been provided in 2003, costing £64,883. In 2009, a second station building was constructed 1/2 mile (0.80 km) to the west along the promenade, providing permanent facilities, costing £935,528.

On 20 August 2016, a day of strong winds and heavy rain, celebrations were held to mark the fiftieth anniversary of Morecambe Lifeboat Station. 30-year-service awards made to two crew members. The day was rounded off by an actual call on the Inshore lifeboat, to an capsized catamaran near Arnside.

Just 17 months later in January 2018, the station would record the death of Keith Willacy at the age of 81. Former Helm and Honorary Secretary, Willacy was the most decorated crew member at Morecambe, awarded the RNLI Bronze Medal in 1973, and the RNLI Silver Medal 10 years later in 1983.

== Station honours ==
The following are awards made at Morecambe:

- RNLI Silver Medal
  Keith Willacy, Helm – 1983
- RNLI Bronze Medal
  Keith Willacy, Helm – 1973
- 'The Thanks of the Institution inscribed on Vellum'
  Andrew Jarvis, crew member – 1973
  Anthony Terence Jolley, crew member – 1983
  Robert Alan Coyle, crew member – 1983
  Keith Willacy, Helm – 1990
  Steven J. Waite, crew member – 1990
  Michael J. Mayfield, crew member – 1990
  Harold Michael Roberts, Helm – 2000
- 'A Framed Letter of Thanks signed by the Chairman of the Institution'
  Keith Willacy, Helm – 1981
  Mark Baxter, Helm – 1985
  David Willacy, crew member – 1985
  John Beaty, Lifeboat Operations Manager – 2004
- A Collective Letter of Thanks signed by the Chairman of the Institution
  All crew and shore helpers – 2004
- Member, Order of the British Empire (MBE)
  Harold Michael Roberts, Senior Hovercraft Commander – 2008NYH

== Morecambe lifeboats ==
=== Inshore lifeboats ===
Op.No. (Note: Op.No. is the RNLI's Operational Number carried on the hull or vehicle.)	Name	On station	Class	Comments
D-93	Unnamed	1966−1972	D-class (RFD PB16)	
D-208	Unnamed	1973−1985	D-class (RFD PB16)	
D-316	Unnamed	1986−1993	D-class (EA16)	
D-440	Brenda Reed	1993−2001	D-class (EA16)	
D-440	Peter Bond	2001−2009	D-class (EA16)	
D-722	Margaret Mary Timpany	2009−2021	D-class (IB1)	(Note: The lifeboat was provided by the generous bequest of Dr Margaret Mary Timpany.)
D-855	Brenda Raworth	2021−	D-class (IB1)	

=== Hovercraft ===
Op.No.	Name	On station	Class	Comments
H-002	The Hurley Flyer	2002−	H-class (Griffon Hoverwork 470TD)	

== See also ==
- List of RNLI stations
- List of former RNLI stations
- Royal National Lifeboat Institution lifeboats
