= Hunstanton Lifeboat Station =

RNLI Lifeboat station in Norfolk, England

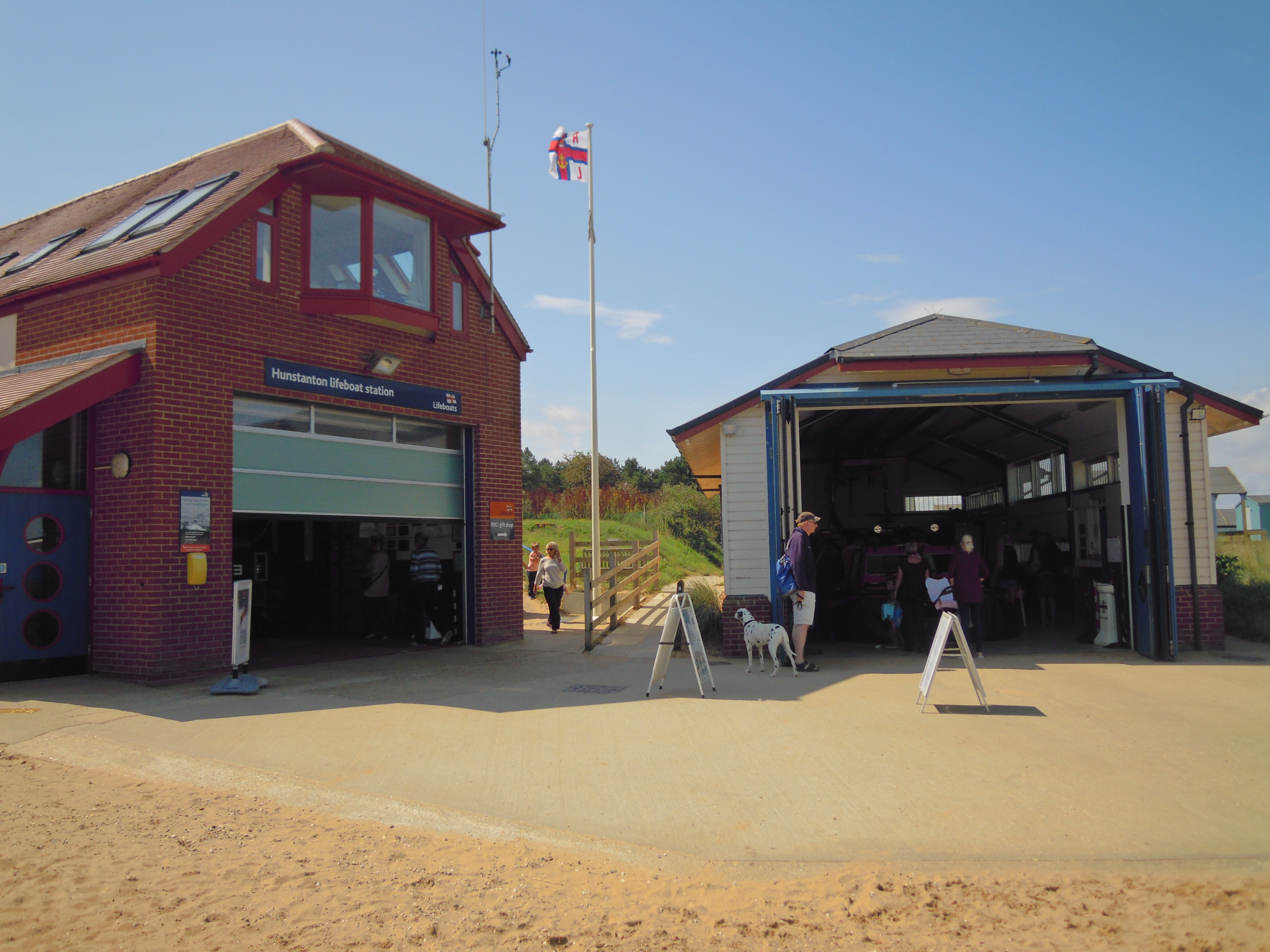
- Hunstanton Lifeboat Station

- Location within Norfolk

General information
- Type: RNLI Lifeboat Station
- Location: Hunstanton Lifeboat Station, Sea Lane,, Old Hunstanton, Norfolk, PE36 6JN, England
- Coordinates: 52°57′14.62″N 0°30′9.53″E
- Opened: NSA 1824–1867; RNLI 1867–1931; RNLI ILB 1979–present
- Owner: Royal National Lifeboat Institution

Website
- Hunstanton RNLI Lifeboat Station

Hunstanton Lifeboat Station is located in the village of Old Hunstanton, in the English county of Norfolk. It is the only lifeboat station on the east coast of England which faces westward, being positioned on the east side of the square-mouthed bay and estuary known as The Wash.

A lifeboat was first placed at Hunstanton in 1824 by the Norfolk Shipwreck Association (NSA). The station was re-established by the Royal National Lifeboat Institution (RNLI), first in 1867, and operating until 1931, and then a second time in 1979, established as an Inshore lifeboat station.

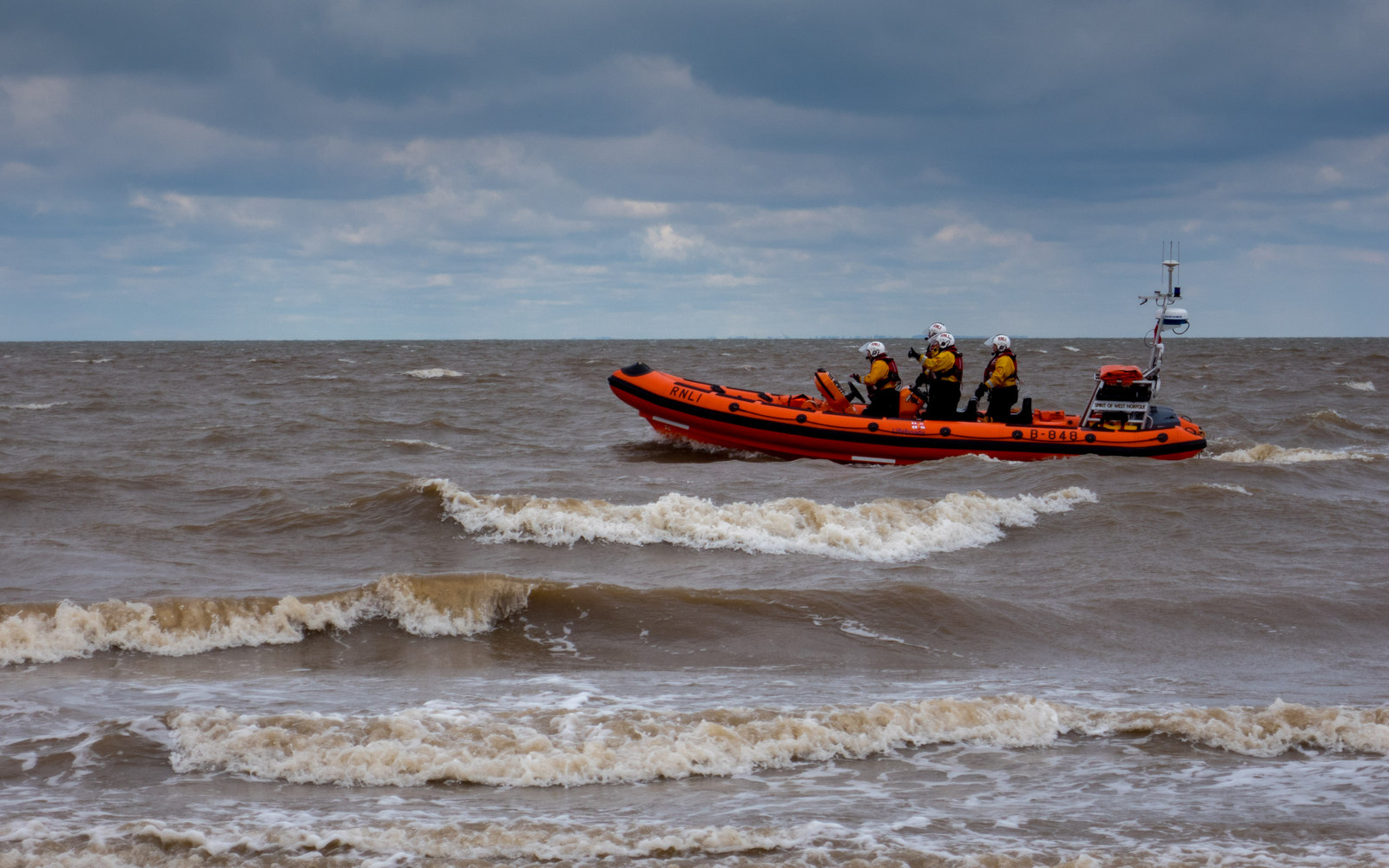
B-class (Atlantic 85) Spirit of West Norfolk (B-848)

The station currently has two 'lifeboats': H-class Hovercraft Hunstanton Flyer (Civil Service No. 45) (H-003), on station since 2003, and a B-class (Atlantic 85) lifeboat, Spirit of West Norfolk (B-848), since 23 May 2011.

== History ==
=== 1824–1900: origins and expansion ===
The first lifeboat station to be established in Hunstanton was formed by the Norfolk Shipwreck Association (NSA) in 1824.

It is believed the first Hunstanton lifeboat fell into disrepair by 1843, and was never replaced. At a meeting of the RNLI committee of management on Thursday 2 July 1867, following a visit by Capt. D. Robertson, assistant Inspector of Lifeboats, it was decided that a new station be established at Hunstanton, and to appropriate the funding provided by the Licensed Victuallers lifeboat fund to the station.

A new boathouse was constructed close to the location of the original, which by then had been demolished. A local committee was formed to run the station.

The 1867 arrival of the new lifeboat was reported in the RNLI journal 'The Lifeboat' in July 1868. The 32 feet (9.8 m) self-righting 'Pulling and Sailing' (P&S) lifeboat, along with its launching carriage, was transported to Hunstanton free of charge by the Great Eastern Railway, who also ran a special excursion train from London for spectators. The lifeboat was taken in grand procession to the boathouse, where after formal presentation to the institution and naming, the lifeboat was launched on demonstration.

The new lifeboat soon proved its value, in January 1868, saving the lives of 16 persons from the barque Thetis, of Gothenburg, and 15 from the steamship S.S. Harmonia, of Hamburg.

Licensed Victualler was on station from 1867 to 1887, during which time she was launched 21 times and saved 86 lives. The second lifeboat, also funded by the Licensed Victuallers, Licensed Victualler(ON 169), was on station from November 1887 until July 1900.

In 1900, the lifeboat station was allocated a new, larger lifeboat, necessitating a bigger boathouse. Land was acquired from the local Lord of the manor to build the new facility, which had a watch-room above the boat bay and a concrete runway down to the chalk roadway that led down to the beach. The construction cost a total of £647. The old station house was put to use as a beach shop and café, which it still is to this day.

The new lifeboat arrived on 30 July 1900, having been in storage in London since its launch and fitting out in February of the same year. She was again delivered free of cost by the Great Eastern Railway, including a launching carriage supplied by the Bristol Wagon Works Co.

The new lifeboat was again funded by and named for the Licensed Victuallers, as the RNLB Licensed Victualler (ON 440). She was a standard self-righting ten-oared pulling lifeboat, 35-foot in length with a beam of 8-foot 3in and a depth of 4-foot. She had two water ballast tanks, a drop keel, and eight relieving tubes. There was also a 10-foot steel sliding keel and a 17-foot 6-in bilge keel. The boat also was fitted with a sailing mast. This lifeboat was on station from July 1900 until 1931, during which time she launched a total of 19 times and is credited with saving the lives of 20 people.

=== 1920s–1931: tractor trials and closure ===
Hunstanton's position on The Wash, with its wide expanse of beach and mud flats, made launching the lifeboat at low tide particularly difficult. The RNLI began to use Hunstanton for trials to assess the use of motorised tractors to launch lifeboats across such terrain. The first trial, on 26 March 1920, successfully tested a Clayton agricultural tractor to tow the lifeboat out to the waters edge. The first specially adapted tractor was delivered to Hunstanton before the equipment was rolled out to other stations which had similar terrain.

By the early 1920s, the Hunstanton lifeboat was launched only infrequently, and the station was officially closed due to inactivity in 1931. The motor lifeboats stationed at Skegness and Wells-next-the-Sea were deemed sufficient to cover the coast of Hunstanton and The Wash.

=== 1970s–1996: reopening and improvements ===
During the 1970s, an increase in marine incidents made it clear that a lifeboat service in The Wash was once again necessary. In 1979 it was agreed that the station would re-open, so the previous boathouse was reacquired and the RNLI provided a D-class inflatable ILB for a one-year trial.

On 24 May a standard relief D-class (RFD PB16) ILB (D-181) was sent to the station, and Hunstanton lifeboat station was officially reopened in June 1979. In April 1980, another D-class ILB (D-126) was sent to the station. The relaunched station was considered a strong success, and in 1982, the RNLI sent a B-class (Atlantic 21) Inshore lifeboat on trial, together with a new drive-on drive-off (DO-DO) trailer and a new Talus MB-764 County tractor, to launch the ILB.

In December 1982, a new lifeboat arrived to replace the Atlantic 21. She was named Spirit of America (B-556) on 11 May 1983 by Vice Admiral Donald D. Engen, a retired US Navy officer and the former president of the Association for Rescue at Sea.

More improvements were made to the facilities in 1996. The Spirit of America was refitted with more powerful 70 horse power engines and GPS equipment, returning to the station on 2 December 1996.

=== 2001–present ===
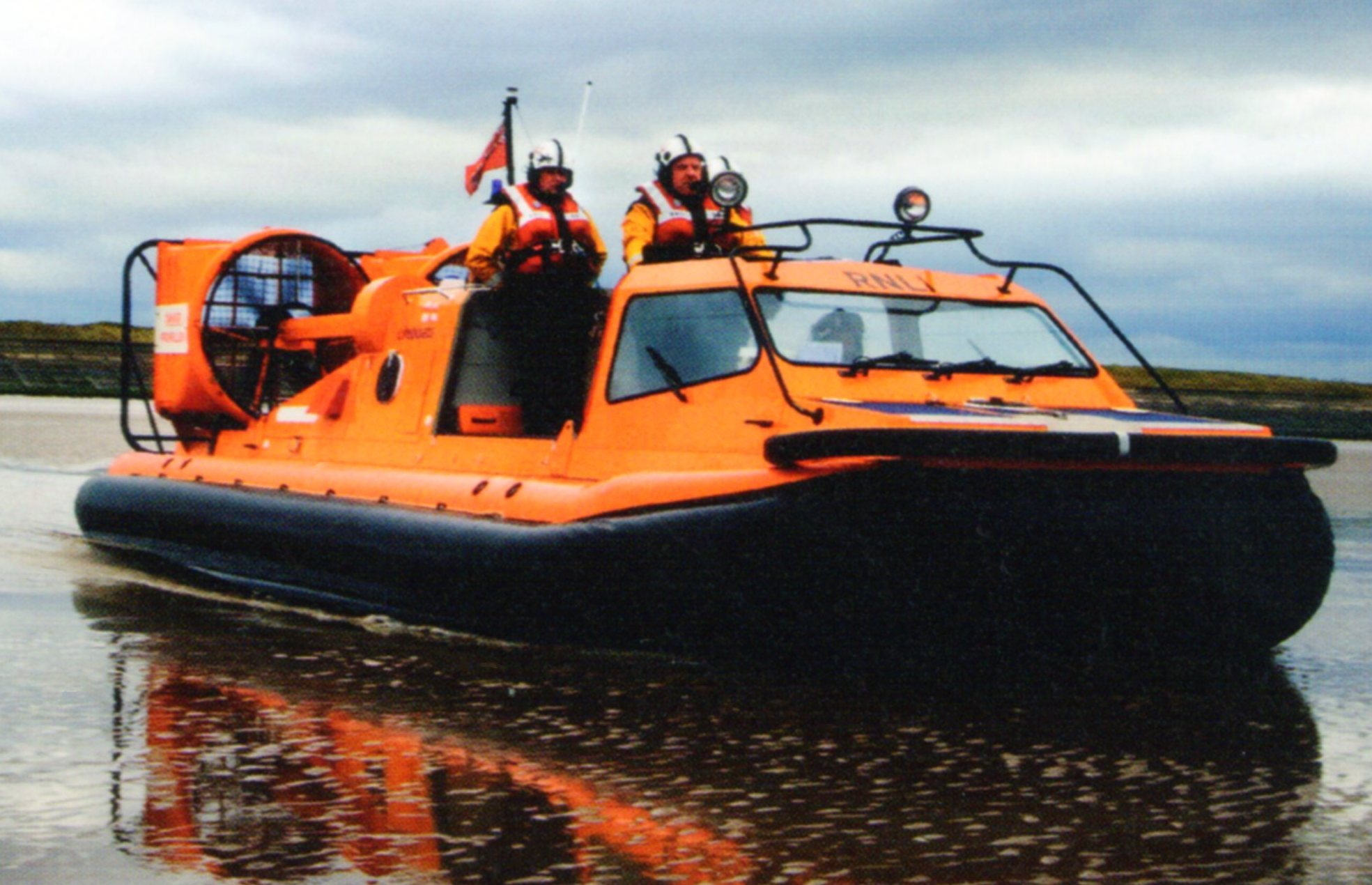
RNLB Hunstanton Flyer (H-003)

In 2001, Hunstanton was one of five lifeboat stations chosen for evaluation trials on a rescue hovercraft, the others being Morecambe, Flint, West Kirby and Southend-on-Sea. The hovercraft spent approximately two weeks at each station where local crew members were shown how to fly the craft. The trials at Hunstanton were considered a success, and on 2 May 2003, the Hunstanton Flyer (Civil Service No. 45) (H-003) arrived on station.

The hovercraft was officially named on 21 May 2005 and handed to the station on 25 July 2003. She had been built by Griffon of Southampton at a cost of £122,000, funded from the Lifeboat Fund of the staff and pensioners of the Civil Service, Royal Mail and British Telecom. She weighs 2,500 kg and has a hull made from marine grade aluminium and fibre reinforced composite. The hovercraft is powered by twin VW Golf turbo diesel engines.

In the Queen's Birthday Honours of 2007, Chair of the Hunstanton Ladies Guild, Margaret Lumley Bullen (née Boulton) was awarded the MBE, for services to charity. During World War II, she had worked with the code-breakers at Bletchley Park, a secret she kept for 50 years.

== Station honours ==
The following are awards made at Hunstanton

- RNLI Bronze Medal
  Alan John Clarke, Helm – 1985
  Alan John Clarke, Helm – 1988 (Second-Service clasp)
- Bronze Medal Service Certificate
  Victor Dade – 1988
  Michael Wallace – 1988
  Gerald Wase – 1988
  Brian Rudd – 1988
  Victor Dade – 1988
  Michael Derby – 1988
- Testimonial on Vellum, awarded by the Royal Humane Society

Alan John Clark – 1988

- Certificate of Commendation, awarded by the Royal Humane Society
  Victor Dade – 1988
- The Thanks of the Institution inscribed on Vellum
  Alan John Clarke, Helm – 1990
- Vellum Service Certificate
  Victor Dade – 1990
  Michael Darby – 1990
  Stephen Garside – 1990
  Michael Wallace – 1990
- Certificate of Merit awarded by the RSPCA
  A. Clarke – 1981
  A. Osborne – 1981
  J. Connors – 1981
- Member, Order of the British Empire (MBE)
  David Thomas Harrison, Lifeboat Operations Manager – 2004NYH
  Margaret Lumley Bullen, Hunstanton RNLI Ladies Guild – 2007QBH
  Victor Dade, crew member – 2026NYH

== Hunstanton lifeboats ==
=== Pulling and Sailing (P&S) lifeboats ===
ON (Note: ON is the RNLI's Official Number of the boat.)	Name	Built	On station	Class	Comments
–	Unnamed	1824	1824–c.1843	North Country lifeboat	(Note: North Country non-self-righting lifeboat of unknown specification, funded by local subscription, operated by the Norfolk Shipwreck Association (NSA).)
Pre-497	Licensed Victualler	1867	1867–1887	32-foot Self-Righting (P&S)	(Note: 32-foot x 7-foot 6in (10-oared) self-righting (P&S) lifeboat, gift of the Licensed Victuallers LB fund, built by Woolfe of Shadwell, London, costing £253.)
169	Licensed Victualler	1887	1887–1900	34-foot Self-Righting (P&S)	(Note: 34-foot x 8-foot (10-oared) self-righting (P&S) lifeboat, gift of the Licensed Victuallers LB fund, Woolfe of Shadwell, London, costing £336.)
440	Licensed Victualler	1900	1900–1931	35-foot Self-Righting (P&S)	(Note: 35-foot x 8-foot 3in (10-oared) self-righting (P&S) lifeboat, gift of the Licensed Victuallers LB fund, built by Thames Ironworks of Blackwall, London, costing £783.)

Station closed in 1931
Pre ON numbers are unofficial numbers used by the Lifeboat Enthusiast Society to reference early lifeboats not included on the official RNLI list.

=== Inshore lifeboats ===
==== D-class ====
Op. No. (Note: Op. No. is the RNLI's Operational Number of the boat carried on the hull.)	Name	On station	Class	Comments
D-181	Unnamed	1979	D-class (RFD PB16)	
D-126	Unnamed	1980–1981	D-class (RFD PB16)	

==== B-class ====
Op. No.	Name	On station	Class	Comments
B-511	Co-operative No.1	1982	B-class (Atlantic 21)	
B-528	Unnamed	1982	B-class (Atlantic 21)	
B-556	Spirit of America	1982–1998	B-class (Atlantic 21)	
B-749	D.J.S. Haverhill	1998–2011	B-class (Atlantic 75)	
B-848	Spirit of West Norfolk	2011–	B-class (Atlantic 85)	

=== Hovercraft ===
Op. No.	Name	On station	Class	Comments
H-003	Hunstanton Flyer (Civil Service No.45)	2003–	Hovercraft	

=== Launch and recovery tractors ===
Op. No.	Reg. No.	Type	On station	Comments
T1	TC 648	Clayton	1921	
T2	AH 5933	Clayton	1921	
T11	BT 4414	Clayton	1922–1923	
T4	XA 9192	Clayton	1923–1931	
TW10	VEL 99X	Talus MB-764 County	1982–1992	
TW20Hc	J125 WUJ	Talus MB-4H Hydrostatic (Mk2)	1992–1999	
TW19Hc	J120 VNT	Talus MB-4H Hydrostatic (Mk2)	1999–2000	
TW37Hc	P898 CUX	Talus MB-4H Hydrostatic (Mk2)	2000–2003	
TW23Hc	K805 CUX	Talus MB-4H Hydrostatic (Mk2)	2003–2013	
TW18Hb	H710 RUX	Talus MB-4H Hydrostatic (Mk1.5)	2013–2021	
TW57Hc	DX03 UZF	Talus MB-4H Hydrostatic (Mk2)	2021–	

== See also ==
- List of RNLI stations
- List of former RNLI stations
- Royal National Lifeboat Institution lifeboats
