= Kinghorn Lifeboat Station =

RNLI lifeboat station in Fife, Scotland

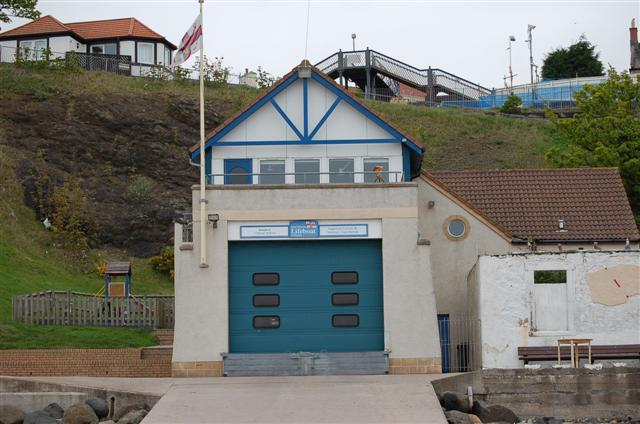
- Kinghorn Lifeboat Station

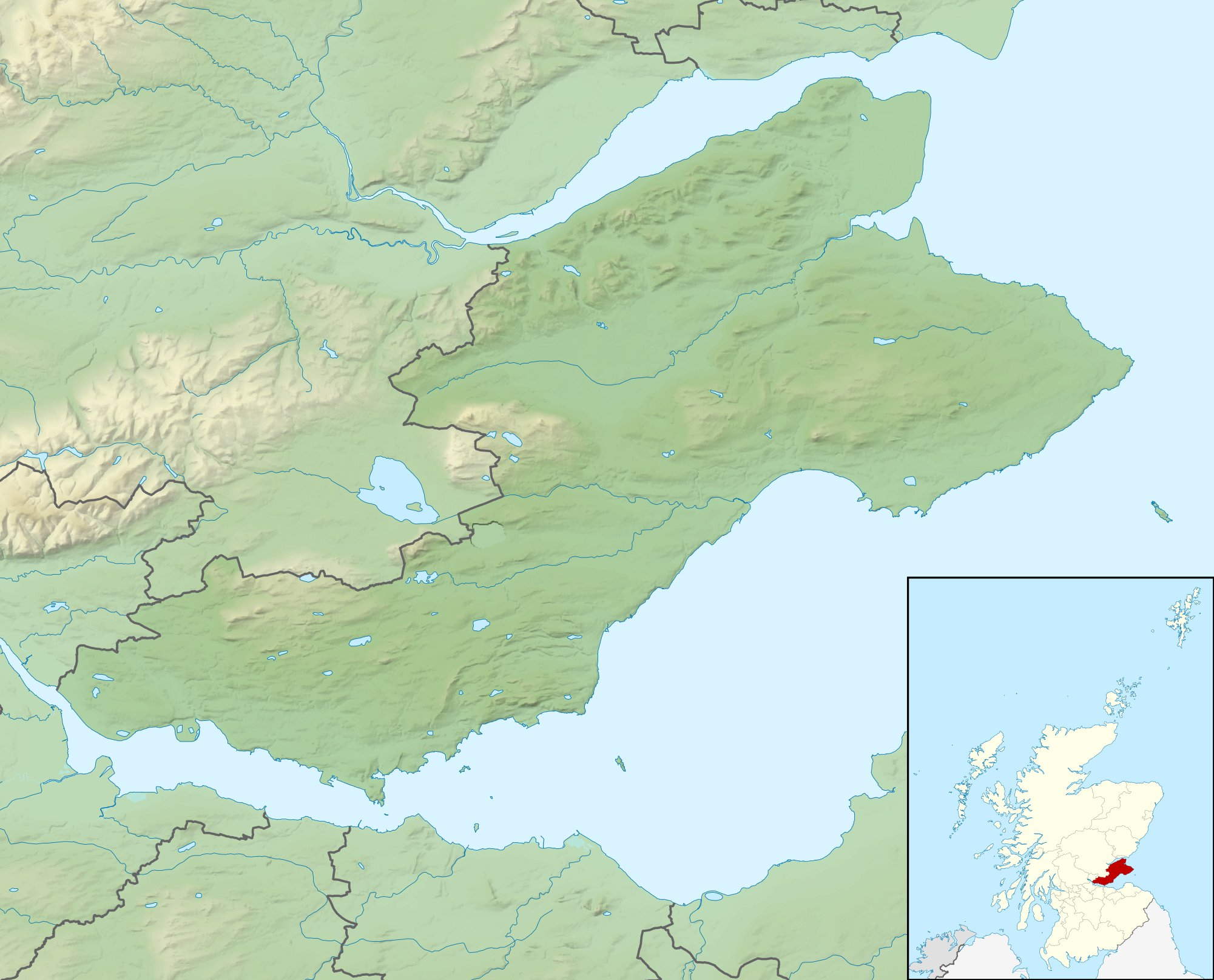
- Location within Fife

General information
- Type: RNLI Lifeboat Station
- Location: 30 St James Place, Kinghorn, Burntisland, KY3 9SU, Scotland
- Coordinates: 56°04′07.0″N 3°10′26.2″W
- Opened: 26 June 1965
- Owner: Royal National Lifeboat Institution

Website
- Kinghorn RNLI Lifeboat Station

Kinghorn Lifeboat Station is located at St James Place, Kinghorn, a town and seaside resort on the northern shore of the Firth of Forth, on the Fife peninsula, on the east coast of Scotland.

A lifeboat station was established at Kinghorn by the Royal National Lifeboat Institution (RNLI) on 26 June 1965.

The station currently operates a B-class (Atlantic 85) Inshore lifeboat, Tommy Niven (B-836), on station since 2009.

== History ==
In 1964, in response to an increasing amount of water-based leisure activity, the RNLI placed 25 small fast Inshore lifeboats around the country. These were easily launched with just a few people, ideal to respond quickly to local emergencies.

Kinghorn Lifeboat Station was established in 1965, to help provide more cover in the Firth of Forth, as leisure craft became more prevalent in the area at that time. Initially a small "Hardun" type shed structure was constructed to house the lifeboat, a D-class (Dunlop) Inshore lifeboat (D-64), which was launched across the beach by hand.

The first launch of the lifeboat in 1965, saw the crew deliver letters to residents of the islands of Inchkeith and Inchcolm in the Firth of Forth, to inform them of the opening of the lifeboat station.

Most Inshore stations were initially operational only for the summer months. However, it was decided to maintain winter operations at 20 stations for 1965, where there were reasonable launching conditions, even in poor weather. Kinghorn was one of three such stations in Scotland. The station would also remain in service in the winter of 1966.

A new pre-cast boathouse was built in 1982, to replace the previous structure. On 10 June 1985 the station received a C-class (Zodiac Grand Raid IV) Inshore lifeboat (C-514), a faster twin-engine version of the D-class. This boat was also accompanied with a sea-going tractor to assist launching.

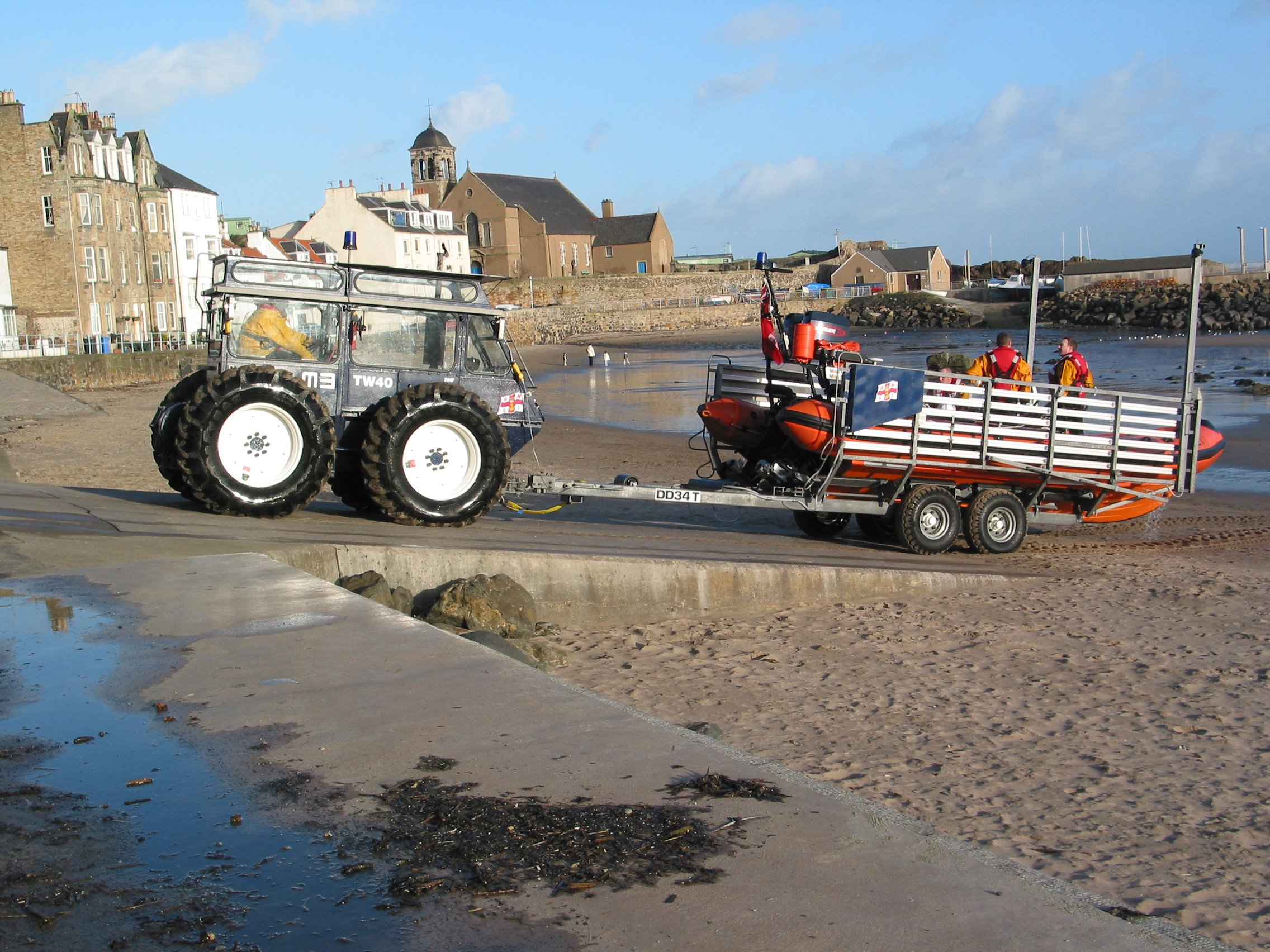
Atlantic 75-class Frederick Robertson (B-720) returning to Kinghorn in 2005

The station building was altered in 1987, to accommodate both the lifeboat and launch carriage.

In 1995 the station was upgraded significantly, with a new two-storey building erected, in preparation to accommodate a larger lifeboat, and the Talus MB-764 County amphibious launch tractor. In addition, the station now had improved lifeboat crew facilities, as well as an operation centre, and visitor souvenir shop. A launch ramp and concrete slipway was installed at the same time.

On 29 June 1995, a twin-engine B-class (Atlantic 21) RIB Inshore lifeboat (B-533) was brought into temporary service for familiarisation purposes. Six months later, on 12 December, the Atlantic 21-class was replaced with an B-class (Atlantic 75), Frederick Robertson (B-720).

=== Current service ===
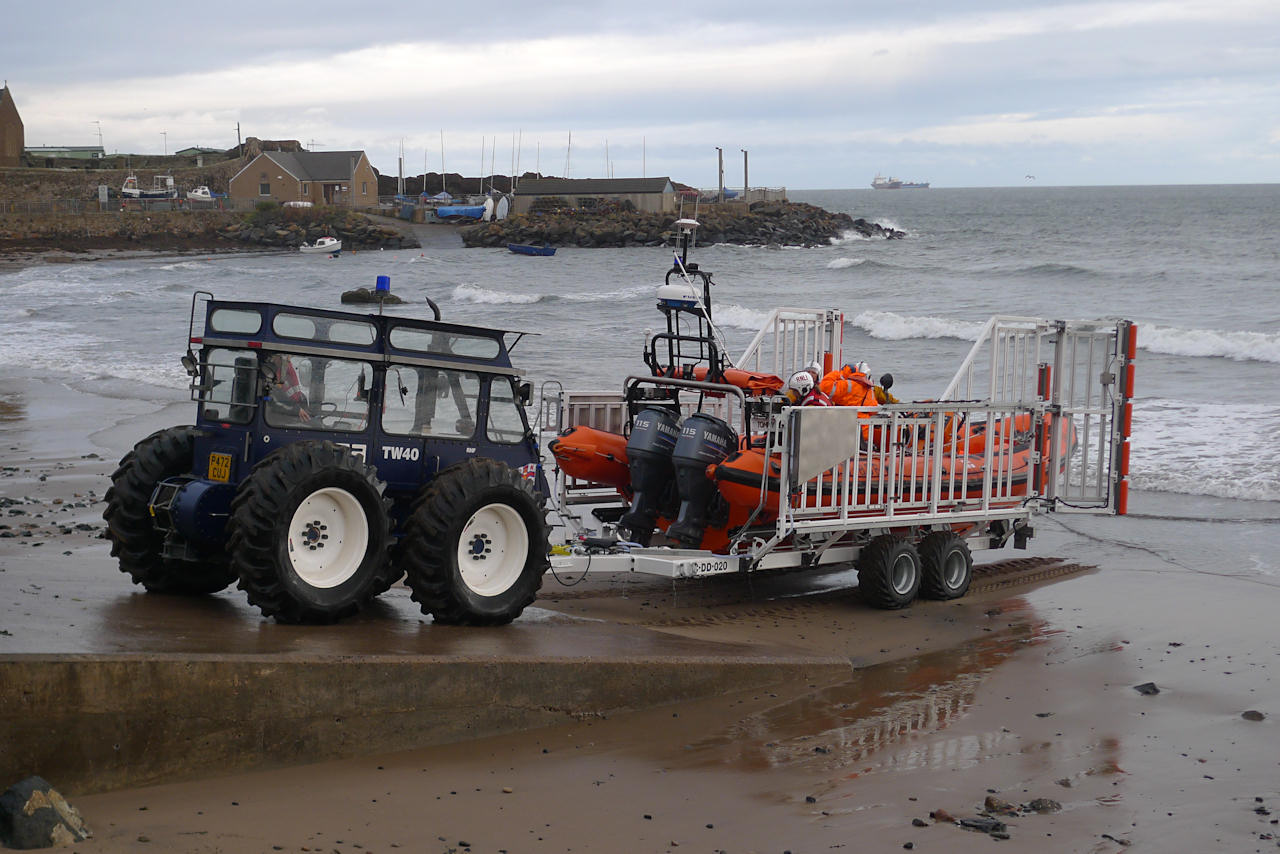
Atlantic 85-class Tommy Niven (B-836) during launch, 2009

The B-class (Atlantic 85) Inshore lifeboat, Tommy Niven (B-836), was brought into service on 22 October 2009, funded from the bequest of the late Mr Thomas Niven.

In 2019 a balloon in the shape of the fictional superhero character Iron Man was mistaken for a person in the water off Kirkcaldy. The Kinghorn lifeboat was scrambled and spent an hour searching for the missing person. A local Subaru car dealership later admitted to accidentally allowing the balloon to blow away and made a donation to the station.

The station holds an annual sponsored Loony Dook, an event on New Years Day, when locals take a dip in the sea, sometimes in fancy dress, and an open day is held during the summer, both to raise funds for the running of the facility.

== Kinghorn lifeboats ==
=== D class and C class ===
Op.No. (Note: Op.No. is the RNLI's Operational Number of the boat carried on the hull.)	Name	On station	Class	Comments
D-64	Unnamed	1965	D-class (Dunlop)	
D-68	Unnamed	1965–1967	D-class (Dunlop)	
D-65	Unnamed	1967	D-class (Dunlop)	
D-123	Unnamed	1968–1976	D-class (RFD PB16)	
D-245	Alick Mackay	1976–1985	D-class (Zodiac III)	
C-514	Unnamed	1985–1995	C-class (Zodiac Grand Raid IV)	

=== B class ===
Op.No.	Name	On station	Class	Comments
B-533	Unnamed	1995	B-class (Atlantic 21)	
B-720	Frederick Robertson	1995–2009	B-class (Atlantic 75)	
B-836	Tommy Niven	2009–	B-class (Atlantic 85)	

=== Launch and recovery tractors ===
Op.No.	Reg.No.	Type	On station	Comments
TW12	D508 RUJ	Talus MB-764 County	1987–1994	
TW10	VEL 99X	Talus MB-764 County	1994–1998	
TW06	VRU 611S	Talus MB-764 County	1998–2003	
TW40	P472 CUJ	Talus MB-764 County	2003–2011	
TW04	TEL 705R	Talus MB-764 County	2011–2012	
TW03	RLJ 367R	Talus MB-764 County	2012–2014	
TW04	TEL 705R	Talus MB-764 County	2014–2017	
TW03	RLJ 367R	Talus MB-764 County	2017–2022	
TW32	L161 LAW	Talus MB-764 County	2022–	

== See also ==
- List of RNLI stations
- List of former RNLI stations
- Royal National Lifeboat Institution lifeboats
- Talus Atlantic 85 DO-DO launch carriage
