= D-class lifeboat (Zodiac III) =

Inshore lifeboat class of the RNLI

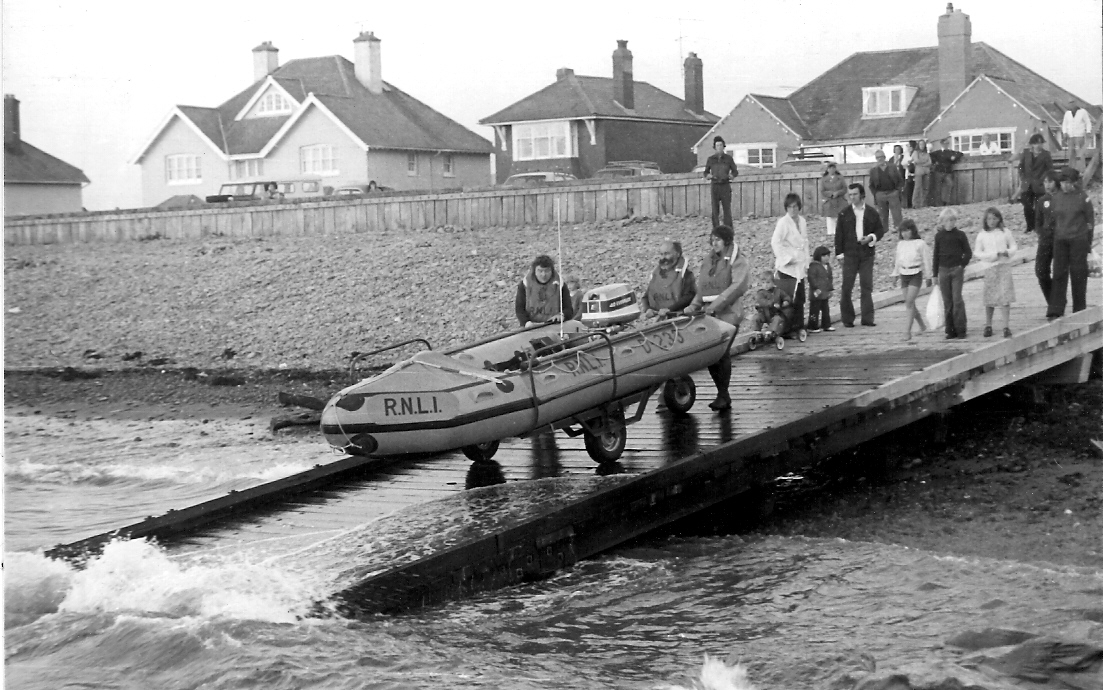
- D-233 being launched at Borth

Class overview
- Name: D-class (Zodiac III)
- Builders: Zodiac Nautic
- Operators: RNLI
- Preceded by: D-class (RFD PB16)
- Succeeded by: D-class (EA16)
- Built: 1971–1987
- In service: 1971–1996
- Completed: 64
- Retired: 64

General characteristics
- Class & type: Zodiac III
- Complement: 2 or 3

The D-class (Zodiac III) lifeboat is a class of inflatable boat, operated between 1971 and 1996 by the Royal National Lifeboat Institution (RNLI) of the United Kingdom and Ireland. It was replaced operationally by the D-class (EA16).

== Utilization ==
For more than 60 years the D-class has served as the workhorse of the RNLI Inshore Lifeboat (ILB) fleet. The D-class is one of the few RNLI types not to feature a rigid hull. The D-class was specifically designed as a light and highly manoeuvrable rapid response craft, especially suited to close shore work.

All of the following fleet details are referenced to the 2026 Lifeboat Enthusiast Society Handbook, with information retrieved directly from RNLI records.

== RNLI Fleet ==
| Op. No. (Note: Op. No. is the RNLI's Operational Number of the boat.) | Name | In service | Station | Comments |
|---|---|---|---|---|
| D-205 | Unnamed | 1971–1976 | Conwy | |
| D-205 | Unnamed | 1976–1987 | Relief fleet | |
| D-206 | Unnamed | 1971–1974 | Relief fleet | |
| D-206 | Unnamed | 1974–1975 | Harwich | |
| D-206 | Unnamed | 1976–1987 | Relief fleet | |
| D-28-P | Unnamed | 1987–1992 | Publicity | |
| D-207 | Unnamed | 1972–1974 | Criccieth | |
| D-207 | Unnamed | 1974–1988 | Relief fleet | |
| D-29-P | Unnamed | 1988–???? | Publicity | |
| D-214 | Unnamed | 1972–1976 | Exmouth | |
| D-214 | Unnamed | 1977–1987 | Relief fleet | |
| D-223 | Unnamed | 1972–1987 | Relief fleet | |
| D-224 | Unnamed | 1975–1982 | Stranraer | |
| D-224 | Unnamed | 1982–1988 | Relief fleet | |
| D-30-P | Unnamed | 1988–???? | Publicity | |
| D-225 | Unnamed | 1975–1976 | Moelfre | |
| D-225 | Unnamed | 1977–1978 | Harwich | |
| D-225 | Unnamed | 1978–1986 | Relief fleet | |
| D-225 | Unnamed | 1986–1987 | Southend-on-Sea | |
| D-31-P | Unnamed | 1987–1988 | Publicity | |
| D-226 | Unnamed | 1975–1982 | Hastings | |
| D-226 | Unnamed | 1982–1988 | Relief fleet | |
| D-227 | Unnamed | 1976–1982 | Withernsea | |
| D-227 | Unnamed | 1982–1988 | Relief fleet | |
| D-32-P | Unnamed | 1988–???? | Publicity | |
| D-228 | Unnamed | 1975–1982 | Craster | |
| D-228 | Unnamed | 1982–1986 | Relief fleet | |
| D-228 | Unnamed | 1986 | Rhyl | |
| D-228 | Unnamed | 1986–1987 | Relief fleet | |
| D-33-P | Unnamed | 1987–???? | Publicity | |
| D-229 | Unnamed | 1975–1984 | Cullercoats | |
| D-229 | Unnamed | 1984–1988 | Relief fleet | |
| D-230 | Miss Winfield | 1975–1987 | West Kirby | |
| D-230 | Miss Winfield | 1987 | Relief fleet | |
| D-231 | Unnamed | 1976–1986 | Burnham-on-Crouch | |
| D-231 | Unnamed | 1987 | Relief fleet | |
| D-232 | Unnamed | 1975–1987 | Bude | |
| D-4-P | Unnamed | 1988 | Publicity | |
| D-233 | Unnamed | 1976–1987 | Borth | |
| D-234 | Unnamed | 1975–1984 | Stonehaven | |
| D-234 | Unnamed | 1985–1986 | Amble | |
| D-234 | Unnamed | 1987 | Relief fleet | |
| D-6-P | Unnamed | 1987–1993 | Publicity | |
| D-235 | Unnamed | 1975–1978 | St Abbs | |
| D-235 | Unnamed | 1979–1987 | Tighnabruaich | |
| D-11-P | Unnamed | 1988 | Publicity | |
| D-236 | Unnamed | 1975–1987 | Southend-on-Sea | |
| D-236 | Unnamed | 1988–???? | Publicity | |
| D-237 | Unnamed | 1975–1987 | Crimdon Dene | |
| D-237 | Unnamed | 1987 | Relief fleet | |
| D-13-P | Unnamed | 1987–1989 | Publicity | |
| D-238 | Hemel Hempstead Round Table | 1976–1987 | New Quay | |
| D-15-P | Hemel Hempstead Round Table | 1987–???? | Publicity | |
| D-239 | Unnamed | 1976–1987 | Conwy | |
| D-240 | Unnamed | 1976–1978 | Harwich | |
| D-240 | Unnamed | 1978–1987 | Relief fleet | |
| D-4-P | Unnamed | 1987–1988 | Publicity | |
| D-241 | Unnamed | 1976–1986 | Rye Harbour | |
| D-241 | Unnamed | 1986 | Kilkeel | |
| D-241 | Unnamed | 1987 | Relief fleet | |
| D-242 | Unnamed | 1976–1987 | Little and Broad Haven | |
| D-242 | Unnamed | 1987–???? | Publicity | |
| D-243 | Unnamed | 1976–1987 | Rhyl | |
| D-243 | Unnamed | 1987–1988 | Relief fleet | |
| D-243 | Unnamed | 1988–1991 | Publicity | |
| D-244 | Unnamed | 1976–1987 | Bembridge | |
| D-244 | Unnamed | 1987–1988 | Publicity | |
| D-245 | Alick Mackay | 1976–1985 | Kinghorn | |
| D-245 | Alick Mackay | 1985–1988 | Relief fleet | |
| D-245 | Alick Mackay | 1988–>1994 | Boarding Boat | |
| D-246 | Spirit of Rotary | 1976–1987 | Wells-next-the-Sea | |
| D-246 | Spirit of Rotary | 1987–1988 | Relief fleet | |
| D-247 | Unnamed | 1976–1987 | Mablethorpe | |
| D-248 | Unnamed | 1976–1978 | Yarmouth | |
| D-248 | Unnamed | 1978–1988 | Relief fleet | |
| D-249 | Caribbean I | 1976–1987 | Holyhead | |
| D-250 | Unnamed | 1977–1988 | Llandudno | |
| D-4-P | Unnamed | 1988–1993 | Publicity | |
| D-251 | Unnamed | 1977–1988 | Lytham St Annes | |
| D-252 | Unnamed | 1976–1988 | Flint | |
| D-5-P | Unnamed | 1988–???? | Publicity | |
| D-253 | Unnamed | 1976–1988 | Sheerness | |
| D-254 | Unnamed | 1977–1988 | Walmer | |
| D-255 | Unnamed | 1977–1987 | Exmouth | |
| D-256 | Lion Cub I | 1978–1986 | St Ives | |
| D-256 | Lion Cub I | 1986–1988 | Relief fleet | |
| D-257 | Unnamed | 1978–1988 | Port Isaac | |
| D-258 | Unnamed | 1978 | On Board 70-003 Clyde | |
| D-258 | Unnamed | 1981 | On Board 70-003 Clyde | |
| D-258 | Unnamed | 1983–1984 | On Board 70-003 Clyde | |
| D-258 | Unnamed | 1986–1988 | On Board 70-003 Clyde | |
| D-258 | Unnamed | 1988–1994 | Boarding Boat | |
| D-259 | S.M.T.A. Shuttle | 1978–1988 | Trearddur Bay | |
| D-259 | S.M.T.A. Shuttle | 1988–1989 | Boarding Boat | |
| D-260 | Gwynaeth | 1978–1988 | Whitby | |
| D-260 | Gwynaeth | 1988–1993 | Boarding Boat | |
| D-261 | Unnamed | 1978–1988 | Kippford | |
| D-261 | Unnamed | 1988–>1994 | Boarding Boat | |
| D-262 | Clacton Round Table 3484 | 1978–1984 | Clacton-on-Sea | |
| D-262 | Clacton Round Table 3484 | 1984–1988 | Relief fleet | |
| D-262 | Clacton Round Table 3484 | 1988–1991 | Boarding Boat | |
| D-263 | Unnamed | 1978–1988 | On Board 70-002 Clyde | |
| D-270 | Unnamed | 1980–1988 | Aldeburgh | |
| D-271 | Unnamed | 1980–1988 | North Sunderland | |
| D-271 | Unnamed | 1988–1989 | Relief fleet | |
| D-271 | Unnamed | 1989–1993 | Boarding Boat | |
| D-272 | Unnamed | 1980–1983 | Criccieth | |
| D-272 | Unnamed | 1983–1989 | Relief fleet | |
| D-278 | Unnamed | 1980–1984 | Newquay | |
| D-278 | Unnamed | 1984–1989 | Relief fleet | |
| D-278 | Unnamed | 1989–???? | Boarding Boat | |
| D-279 | Unnamed | 1981–1989 | Penarth | |
| D-279 | Unnamed | 1989–???? | Boarding Boat | |
| D-280 | Unnamed | 1981–1989 | Tynemouth | |
| D-2-P | Unnamed | 1989–1992 | Publicity | |
| D-281 | Sewing Machine Times | 1981–1989 | Aberdeen | |
| D-9-P | Sewing Machine Times | 1989–???? | Publicity | |
| D-282 | Unnamed | 1981–1989 | Weston-super-Mare | |
| D-282 | Unnamed | 1989–1993 | Boarding Boat | |
| D-283 | Unnamed | 1982–1990 | Skerries | |
| D-287 | Unnamed | 1983–1989 | Stranraer | |
| D-287 | Unnamed | 1989–???? | Publicity | |
| D-288 | Cinque Ports I | 1983–1989 | Hastings | |
| D-20-P | Cinque Ports I | 1989–???? | Publicity | |
| D-289 | Unnamed | 1983–1989 | Withernsea | |
| D-290 | Unnamed | 1983–1989 | Craster | |
| D-290 | Unnamed | 1989–1990 | Relief fleet | |
| D-312 | Court Henbury | 1985–1992 | Relief fleet | |
| D-312 | Court Henbury | 1992–1995 | Publicity | |
| D-313 | Unnamed | 1985–1992 | Relief fleet | |
| D-313 | Unnamed | 1992–1995 | Publicity | |
| D-314 | Tricentrol I | 1985–1992 | Relief fleet | |
| D-314 | Tricentrol I | 1992–1995 | Publicity | |
| D-340 | Blue Peter VI | 1987–1994 | Relief fleet | |
| D-341 | Unnamed | 1987–1988 | Relief fleet | |
| D-341 | Unnamed | 1988 | Southend-on-Sea | |
| D-341 | Unnamed | 1989 | Southend-on-Sea | |
| D-341 | Unnamed | 1989–1993 | Relief fleet | |
| D-341 | Unnamed | 1993–1994 | Boarding Boat | |
| D-342 | Unnamed | 1987–1992 | Relief fleet | |
| D-342 | Unnamed | 1993–1996 | Boarding Boat | |
