= Stranraer Lifeboat Station =

RNLI lifeboat station in Dumfries and Galloway, Scotland

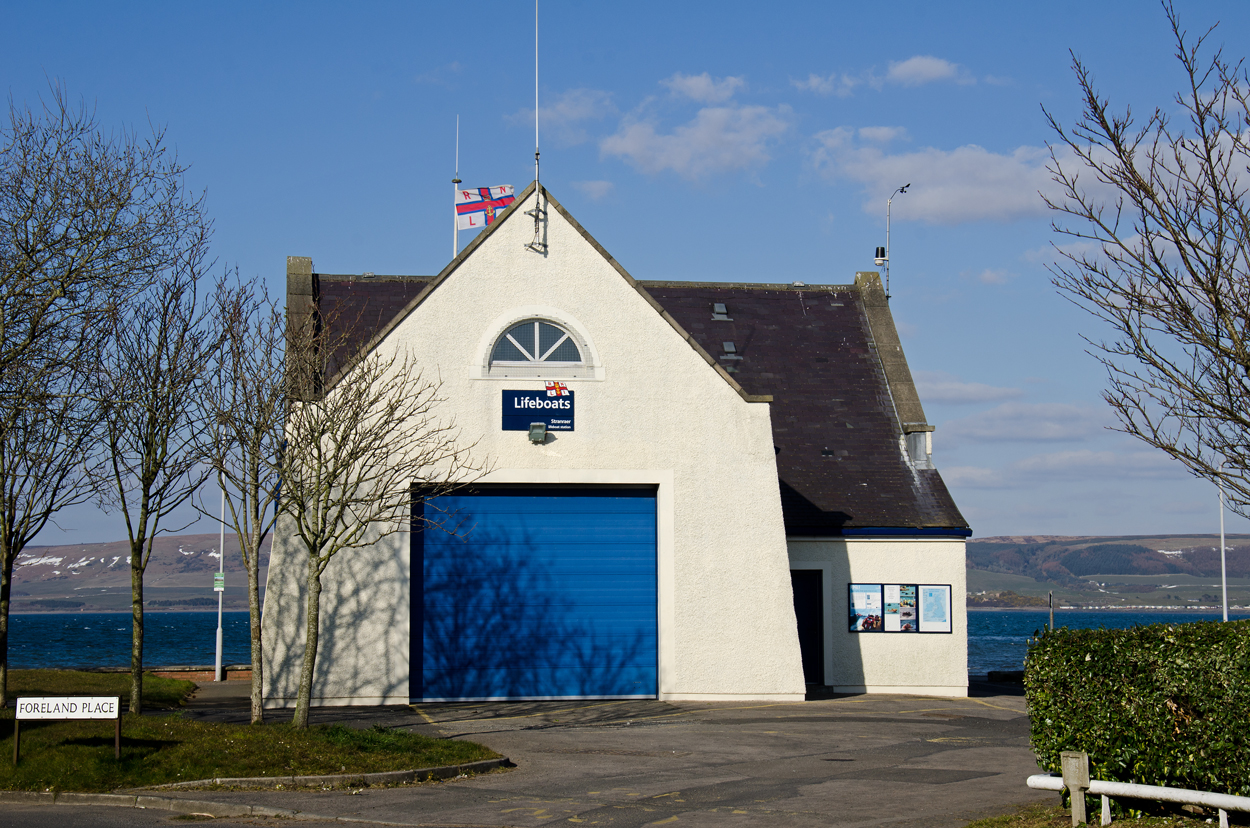
- Stranraer Lifeboat Station

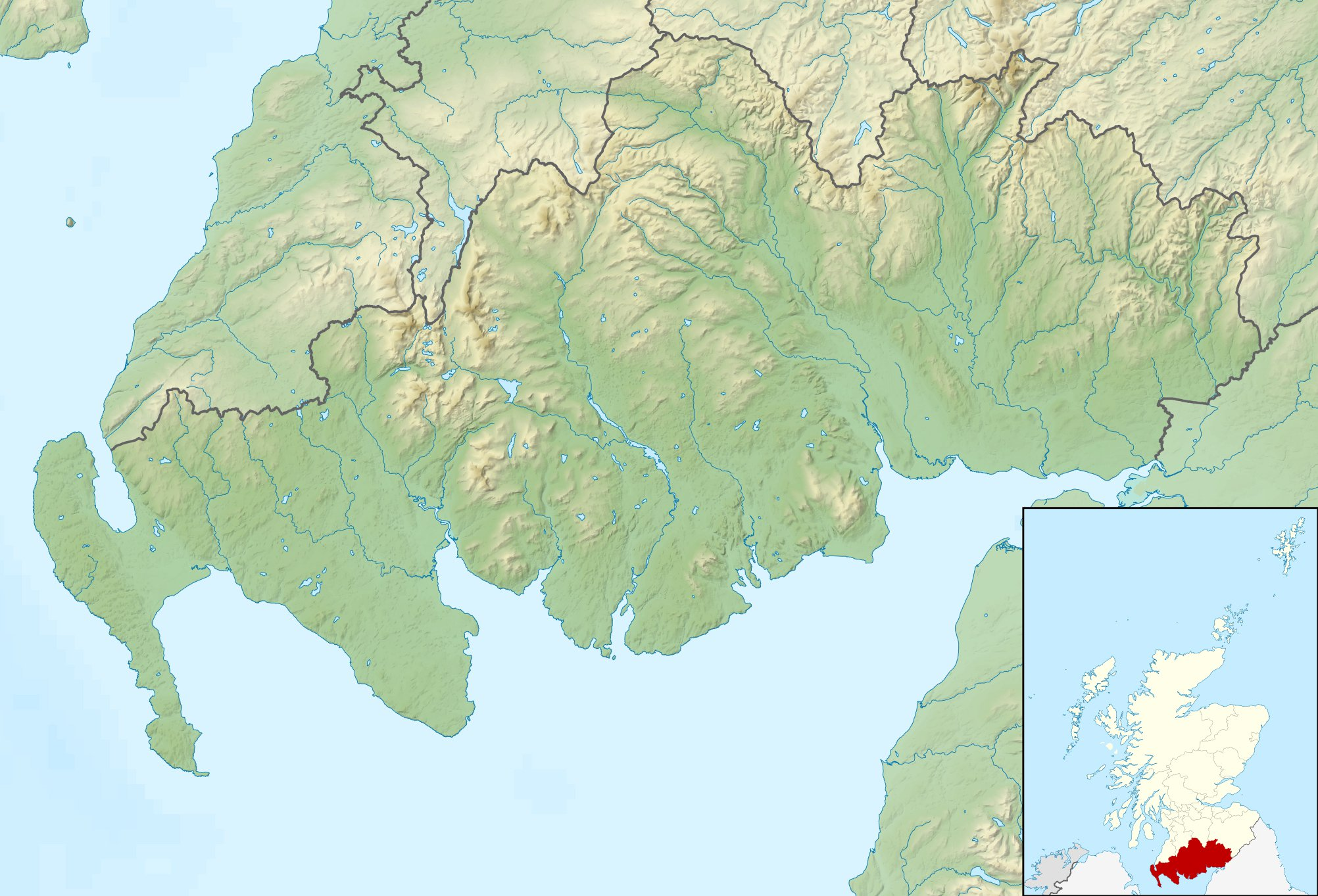
- Location within Dumfries and Galloway

General information
- Type: RNLI Lifeboat Station
- Location: Foreland Place, Stranraer, Dumfries and Galloway, DG9 0EB, Scotland
- Coordinates: 54°54′29.4″N 5°02′06.8″W
- Opened: 4 June 1974
- Owner: Royal National Lifeboat Institution

Website
- Stranraer RNLI Lifeboat Station

Stranraer Lifeboat Station is located at Foreland Place, Stranraer, a port town which sits at the bottom end of Loch Ryan, on the north side of the isthmus joining the Rhins of Galloway double-headed peninsula to the mainland, formerly in Wigtownshire, now in the administrative region of Dumfries and Galloway.

A D-class (RFD PB16) Inshore lifeboat was first stationed at Stranraer by the Royal National Lifeboat Institution (RNLI) on 4 June 1974.

The station currently operates a D-class (IB1) Inshore lifeboat, Sheila MacDonald (D-833), on station since 2018.

== History ==
In 1964, in response to an increasing amount of water-based leisure activity, the RNLI placed 25 small fast Inshore lifeboats around the country. These were easily launched with just a few people, ideal to respond quickly to local emergencies.

More stations were opened, but it wasn't until June 1974, that a lifeboat station was established at Stranraer, with the arrival of a D-class (RFD PB16) Inshore lifeboat, the unnamed (D-132). The station was operational only during the summer months. The lifeboat was housed in a Marley 'M-Plan' boathouse.

One of the more unusual calls came on 9 September 1984, whilst the lifeboat was on Sunday exercise. The Stranraer D-class (Zodiac III) lifeboat (D-287) was called to the aid of a Volkswagen Beetle. This particular vehicle had been heavily modified, and its occupants, Steve Good and Peter Duncan were attempting to cross the Irish Sea, from Stranraer to Larne, for episode 5 'Water Beetle', of the BBC Television programme Duncan Dares. The engine failed when the vehicle had first entered the water, and had to be towed ashore by the lifeboat. Despite the (good) weather forecast, a later attempt encountered particularly rough conditions, but the car still managed to get 18 miles, before the engine failed again, and the car was towed ashore once again. Duncan reported that the crossing attempt was spotted by a submarine, which surfaced to check on what it had seen.

By 1993, the basic boathouse provided in 1974 was nearing the end of its operational life. A new boathouse was proposed and agreed, with works starting in November 1993. Construction was completed in June 1994, the building not only housing the D-class class lifeboat and launch vehicle, but also providing a workshop and crew facilities.

Stranraer lifeboat station was made operational all-year-round in 1996.

In 2008, Stranraer would receive the new D-class (IB1) Inshore lifeboat, funded by the Communications and Public Service Lifeboat Fund, more commonly known as The Lifeboat Fund, a fundraising charity supported by members of the Civil Service, Royal Mail, Post Office and British Telecommunications workers (CISPOTEL), through 'payroll and pension payroll giving'. The Fund was founded in 1866. At a ceremony on Saturday 15 November 2008, the fund's 49th lifeboat, Stranraer Saviour (Civil Service No.49) (D-697) was formally named and handed over to the RNLI.

A new lifeboat arrived at Stranraer in 2018. Sheila MacDonald (D-833), was provided by the RS Macdonald Charitable Trust. The trust was set up by Roderick Stewart Macdonald in November 1978, with funds inherited from his family. His grandfather, R. J. Macdonald, had been one of the founders of the distillery company Macdonald & Muir Ltd, which eventually became Glenmorangie plc.

In the 200th year of the RNLI, Stranraer Lifeboat Station would also celebrated their 50th anniversary.

== Stranraer lifeboats ==
Op.No. (Note: Op. No. is the RNLI's Operational Number of the boat or vehicle carried on the hull.)	Name	On station	Class	Comments
D-132	Unnamed	1974	D-class (RFD PB16)	
D-224	Unnamed	1975–1982	D-class (Zodiac III)	
D-287	Unnamed	1983–1989	D-class (Zodiac III)	
D-388	Crusader	1989–1998	D-class (EA16)	
D-538	Tom Broom	1998–2008	D-class (EA16)	
D-697	Stranraer Saviour (Civil Service No.49)	2008–2018	D-class (IB1)	
D-833	Sheila MacDonald	2018–	D-class (IB1)	

== See also ==
- List of RNLI stations
- List of former RNLI stations
- Royal National Lifeboat Institution lifeboats
