= D-class lifeboat (Dunlop) =

Inshore lifeboat class of the RNLI

Class overview
- Name: D-class (Dunlop)
- Operators: Royal National Lifeboat Institution
- Preceded by: D-class (RFD PB16)
- Succeeded by: D-class (RFD PB16)
- Built: 1965
- In service: 1965–1974
- Completed: 11
- Retired: 11

General characteristics
- Class & type: Dunlop
- Complement: 2 or 3

The D-class (Dunlop) lifeboat is a small class of inflatable boat, operated by the Royal National Lifeboat Institution (RNLI) in the United Kingdom, between 1964 and 1969.

== Utilization ==
For more than 60 years the D-class has served as the workhorse of the RNLI Inshore Lifeboat (ILB) fleet. The D-class is one of the few RNLI types not to feature a rigid hull. The D-class was specifically designed as a light and highly manoeuvrable rapid response craft, especially suited to close shore work.

== History ==
In 1962, the number of rescues or attempted rescues by All-weather lifeboats in the summer months was 98, with the number of lives rescued being 133. In 1963, in response to an increasing amount of water-based leisure activity, the RNLI began trials of small fast Inshore lifeboats, placed at various locations around the country. These were easily launched with just a few people, ideal to respond quickly to local emergencies. This quickly proved to be very successful. In 1963, there were 226 rescues or attempted rescues in the summer months, as a result of which 225 lives were saved.

During the early stages of deployment, the RNLI primarily used the D-class (RFD PB16), built by R.F.D. Co.Ltd of Godalming, Surrey, but others built by other manufacturers were trialed, including this version by Dunlop. Just 11 boats were ordered, operated at 10 different lifeboat stations between 1965 and 1969.

== RNLI Fleet ==
Op. No. (Note: Op. No. is the RNLI's Operational Number of the boat.)	Name	In service	Station	Comments
D-59	Unnamed	–	Trials	
D-60	Unnamed	1965–1966	Southend-on-Sea	
D-61	Unnamed	1965	Mablethorpe	
D-61	Unnamed	1966	Southend-on-Sea	
D-61	Unnamed	1966–1968	Eastbourne	
D-62	Unnamed	1965–1966	Moelfre	
D-62	Unnamed	1967–1969	Southend-on-Sea	
D-63	Unnamed	1967	Southend-on-Sea	
D-64	Unnamed	1965	Kinghorn	
D-65	Unnamed	1965	West Mersea	
D-65	Unnamed	1966	Kinghorn	
D-65	Unnamed	1967	Kinghorn	
D-65	Unnamed	1967–1970	Relief fleet	
D-65	Unnamed	1970	Kippford	
D-65	Unnamed	1970–1974	Relief fleet	
D-66	Unnamed	1965–1968	Helensburgh	
D-67	Unnamed	1965	Moelfre	
D-67	Unnamed	1965–1966	Mablethorpe	
D-68	Unnamed	1965	Scarborough	
D-68	Unnamed	1965–1967	Kinghorn	
D-69	Unnamed	1965–1967	Poole	

== See also ==
- Royal National Lifeboat Institution lifeboats
