= H-class lifeboat =

Lifeboat of the British RNLI

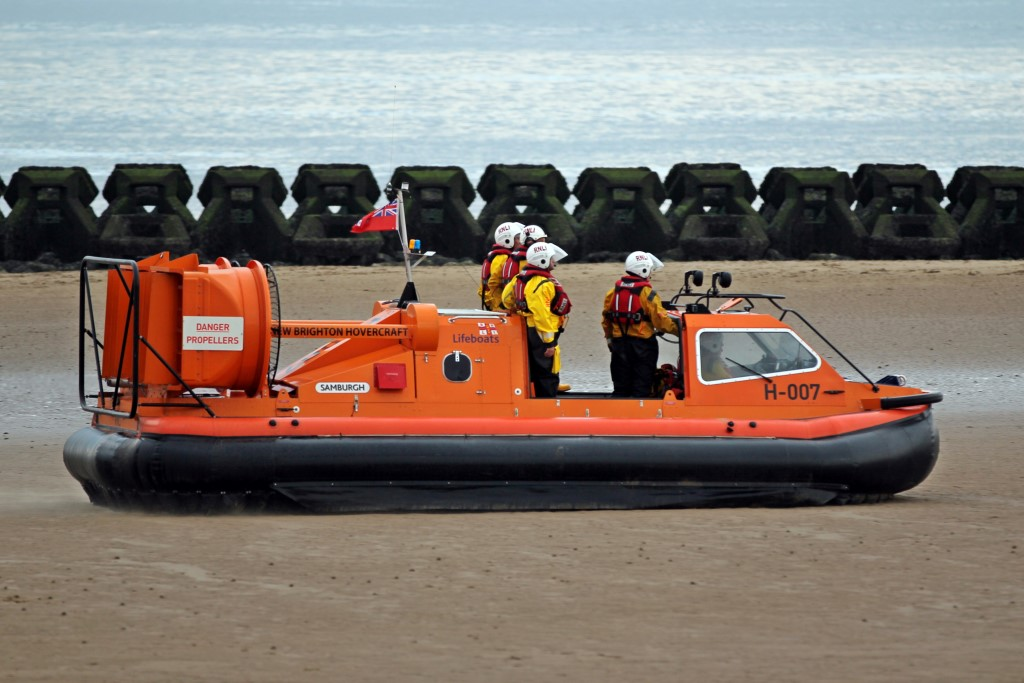
- RNLI hovercraft H-007 Samburgh at New Brighton in 2015

Class overview
- Name: H-class rescue hovercraft
- Builders: Griffon Hoverwork
- Operators: Royal National Lifeboat Institution (RNLI)
- Preceded by: None
- Built: 2002–2009
- In service: 2002–present
- Completed: 7
- Active: 7

General characteristics
- Displacement: 3.86 tonnes
- Length: 8.04 m (26.4 ft)
- Beam: 3.36 m (11.0 ft)
- Draught: N/A
- Propulsion: 2 × VW 1.9 turbo diesels
- Speed: 30 knots (35 mph; 56 km/h)
- Endurance: 3 hours
- Capacity: 10
- Complement: 2–4

The H-class lifeboat is not a traditional lifeboat, but a rescue hovercraft, deployed at four stations around the United Kingdom, as part of the Royal National Lifeboat Institution (RNLI) Inshore fleet.

A modified Type 470TD design, built by Griffon Hoverwork, they were developed to operate on intertidal mudflats and sand, such as Morecambe Bay, in waters too shallow for normal craft, where strandings by incoming tides can have fatal consequences.

A Hovercraft was first assigned to Morecambe in 2002, followed by Hunstanton in 2003, and at Southend-on-Sea and New Brighton in 2004. In 2016, the New Brighton Hovercraft H-005 Hurley Spirit was reassigned to Hoylake.

In 2023, trials were carried out by the RNLI, assisted by the team at Hoylake station, to evaluate different crafts being considered as a potential successor to the current hovercraft.

== Construction ==
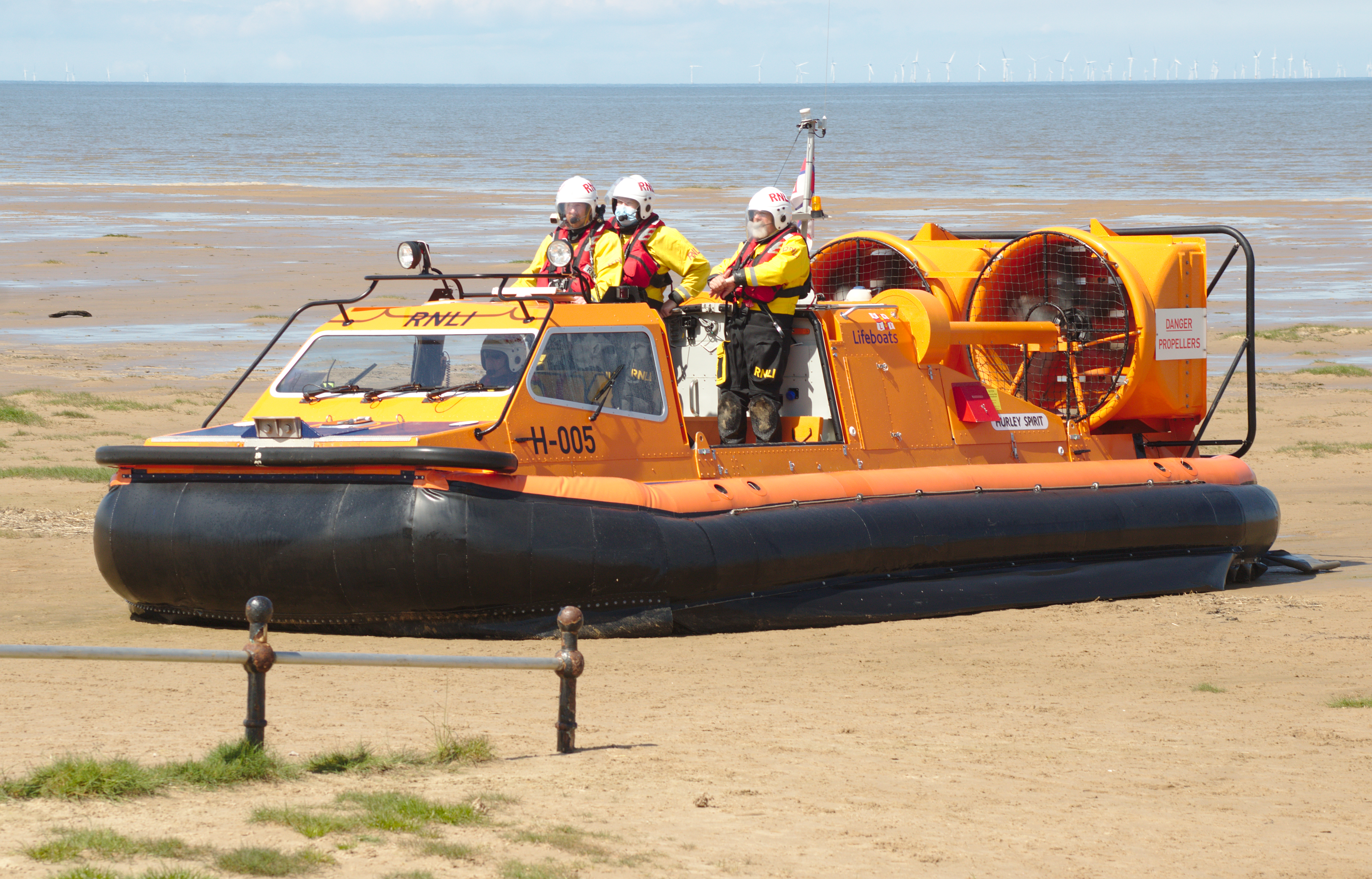
RNLB Hurley Spirit (H-005) approaching the old slipway at the old Hoylake lifeboat station.

The hovercraft is manufactured by Griffon Hoverwork of Southampton, and is a modification of the standard 450TD, now designated the 470TD. This resulted in an increased length, greater stability, buoyancy and thrust, and decreased noise levels.

The hull is constructed from marine-grade aluminium, with the superstructure and fan ducts manufactured from moulded FRC. The body of the hovercraft is 7.5 m (25 ft) in length, with the skirt bring the total length to 8.05 m (26.4 ft). The craft is powered by twin Volkswagen AVM 1.9 litre inline 4-cylinder turbocharged 84-hp diesel engines, and can achieve a maximum speed of 30 knots. The engines supply power both to provide air-pressure under the hull to lift the craft, and also to provide thrust through the fans mounted at the rear.

== Hovercraft Fleet ==
Op.No. (Note: Op.No. is the RNLI's Operational Number of the boat.)	Name	In service	Station	Comments
H-001	Molly Rayner	2002–	Relief fleet	
H-002	The Hurley Flyer	2002–	Morecambe	
H-003	Hunstanton Flyer (Civil Service No.45)	2003–	Hunstanton	
H-004	Vera Ravine	2004–	Southend-on-Sea	
H-005	Hurley Spirit	2004–2016	New Brighton	
H-005	Hurley Spirit	2016–	Hoylake	
H-006	John Russell	2005–	Relief fleet	
H-007	Samburgh	2009–	Relief fleet	
