= Crimdon Dene Lifeboat Station =

Former lifeboat station in County Durham, England

- Crimdon Dene beach

- Location within County Durham

General information
- Status: Closed
- Type: RNLI Lifeboat Station
- Location: Crimdon Beach, Crimdon Dene Holiday Park, Crimdon, County Durham, TS27 4DW, England
- Coordinates: 54°43′39.4″N 1°15′04.9″W
- Opened: 6 June 1966
- Closed: 31 October 1993

Crimdon Dene Lifeboat Station was located at Crimdon Beach at Crimdon, approximately 4 miles (6.4 km) north of Hartlepool, on the east coast of England in County Durham.

An Inshore lifeboat station was established here in 1966, by the Royal National Lifeboat Institution (RNLI).

After operating just three different Inshore lifeboats over a period of 27 years, Crimdon Dene Lifeboat Station was closed in 1993.

== History ==
In 1962, the number of rescues or attempted rescues by All-weather lifeboats in the summer months was 98, with the number of lives rescued being 133. In 1963, in response to an increasing amount of water-based leisure activity, the RNLI began trials of small fast Inshore lifeboats, placed at various locations around the country. These were easily launched with just a few people, ideal to respond quickly to local emergencies. This quickly proved to be very successful. In 1963, there were 226 rescues or attempted rescues in the summer months, as a result of which 225 lives were saved.

In 1966, it was decided to establish an Inshore lifeboat station on the beach at Crimdon Dene. The Inshore lifeboat D-106, originally intended for Dún Laoghaire, was assigned to the station. The new boat could provide a much faster response for incidents in the area, than the 46-foot Watson-class All-weather lifeboat The Princess Royal (Civil Service No.7) (ON 828), stationed 4 miles (6.4 km) to the south at Hartlepool. Initially, Inshore lifeboats were placed on station just for the summer season.

The lifeboat was stored underneath the beach toilet block, a former World War II lookout post.

After nine years service, the D-class (RFD PB16) inshore lifeboat was replaced in 1975 by a D-class (Zodiac III) lifeboat (D-237), funded by the Ancient Order of Foresters. On Saturday 10 April 1976, approximately 60 members of the Order attended the station at Crimdon Dene, along with their families, for the formal handing over, dedication and blessing of the new lifeboat.

Crimdon Dene would get their third and final lifeboat in 1987. The new 16 ft (4.9 m) lifeboat this time was a D-class (EA16), and was one of two provided from the legacy of Mrs Dorothy Martin of Bexhill-on-Sea, with the other being placed at Torbay. At a ceremony at Crindon Centre Club on 12 August 1987, the lifeboat was accepted to the care of Crimdon Dene lifeboat station by George Lennard, Honorary Secretary. After a service of dedication by Rev. Charles Cole, Vicar of St Andrew's Church, Blackhall, branch chairman David O'Donnell invited Mrs Linda Barker, wife of councillor A. Barker, chairman of Easington District Council, to name the lifeboat Norman Victor Hickling (D-337), after the late brother of Mrs Martin, who had been killed in action during World War II.

In an ideal world, a lifeboat should never be needed. However, under-used assets are better placed elsewhere, and this would be the fate of Crimdon Dene Lifeboat Station. In the last eight years of operation, the lifeboat was called just eight times, with no lives saved. Crimdon Dene Lifeboat Station was closed at the end of the summer season, on 31 October 1993. The lifeboat on station, Norman Victor Hickling (D-337), was transferred to the Relief fleet.

Following a period of vandalism, the former station building was finally demolished in 1999.

== Station honours ==
The following are awards made at Crimdon Dene.

- Resuscitation Certificate, awarded by the Royal Humane Society
  A. N. Phillips – 1967
  I. A. Goodrich – 1967

== Crimdon Dene lifeboats ==
=== D class lifeboats ===
Op.No. (Note: Op.No. is the RNLI's Operational Number of the boat carried on the hull.)	Name	On station	Class	Comments
D-106	Unnamed	1966−1974	D-class (RFD PB16)	
D-237	Unnamed	1975–1987	D-class (Zodiac III)	
D-337	Norman Victor Hickling	1987−1993	D-class (EA16)	

== See also ==
- List of RNLI stations
- List of former RNLI stations
- Royal National Lifeboat Institution lifeboats
