= LVS Ascot =

Coordinates: 51.4126°N 0.7033°W

- Ascot, Berkshire, SL5 8DR; United Kingdom

Information
- School type: Private, co-educational, day and boarding
- Motto: Fidelis ad finem (Faithful to the end)
- Established: 1803; 223 years ago
- Founder: Society of Licensed Victuallers
- Department for Education URN: 110159 Tables
- Age range: 4–18
- Enrollment: 900
- Website: www.lvs.ascot.sch.uk

LVS Ascot is a private, co-educational, day and boarding school for pupils aged 4 to 18, situated near Ascot in the English county of Berkshire. It is operated by the Licensed Trade Charity, and parents who work in the licensed drinks trade receive a 20% discount on fees.

== History ==
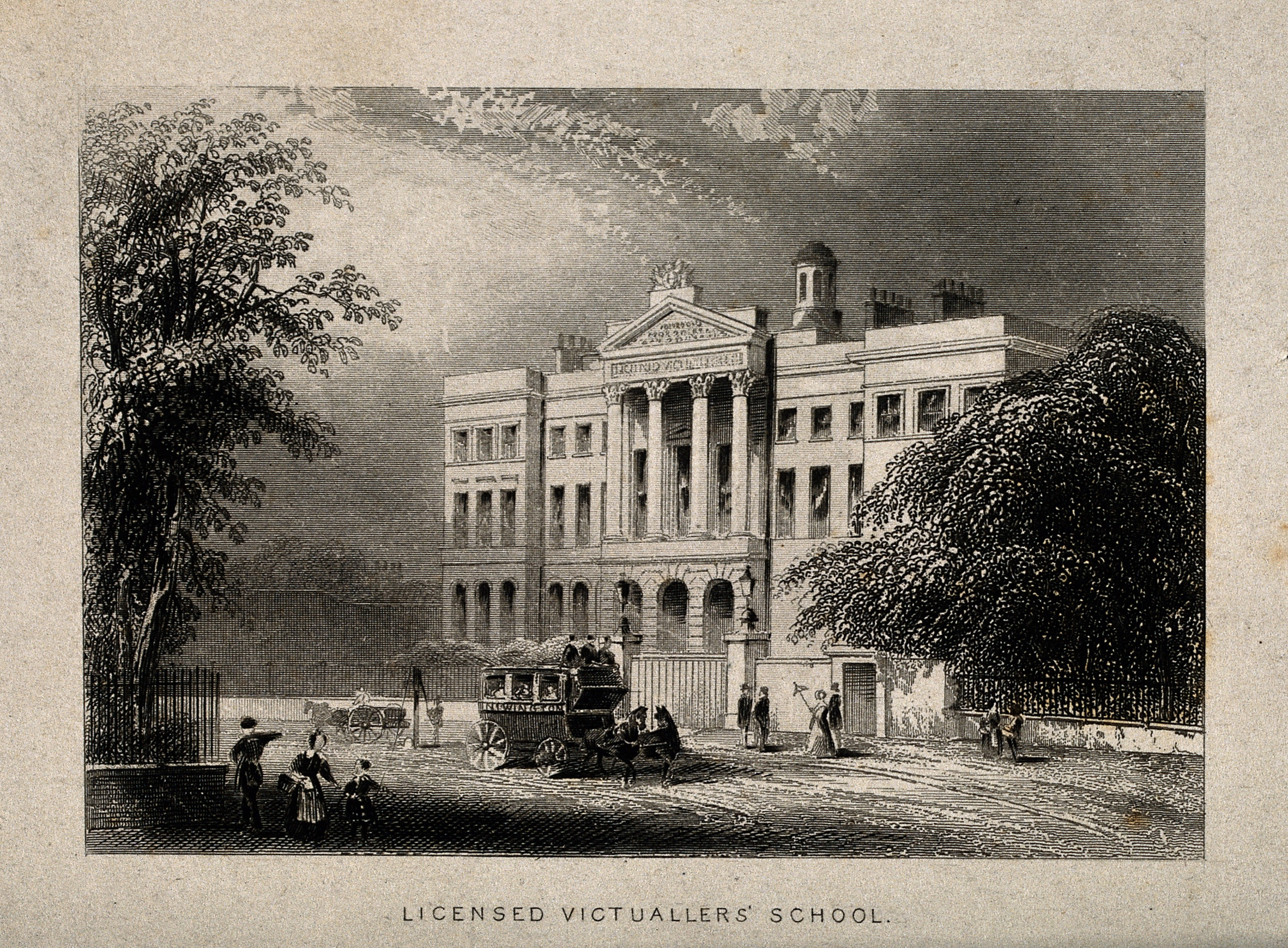
LVS's former London premises, built in 1836

Founded in 1803 by the Society of Licensed Victuallers (now operating as the Licensed Trade Charity), the school was originally situated at what is now Imperial Court in Kennington, London. As industrialization advanced, the school lost its "wholesome and airy environment", and so in 1922 left the city for a site in Slough. The same concern caused the school to move to its current home in Ascot in 1989. LVS Ascot was formerly known as Licensed Victuallers' School.

== Today ==
LVS Ascot is set in 25 acres (100,000 m^{2}) of land within Ascot, on the site formerly occupied by Heatherdown Preparatory School. The Queen was the school's patron. The school's 900 pupils, of which some 200 are boarders, are split into three houses: Buchanan-Coburg, Kennington-Hart, and Melbourne-Brake. Facilities include an indoor swimming pool, a 300-seat theatre, a recording studio, a sports centre, a gym, and a rock-climbing wall. A new all-weather sports pitch was opened by Olympic hockey medallist Sarah Thomas in 2014.

== Notable alumni ==
- Nicholas Cowell, property developer
- Simon Cowell, television personality and music executive
- Lewis Hall, footballer
- Paula Hamilton, model
- Holly Hull, singer and actress
- Simon Ip, Hong Kong politician
- John Moore, Baron Moore of Lower Marsh, Conservative cabinet minister
- Amar Singh, art and non-fungible token (NFT) dealer, philanthropist, women's rights and LGBTQ+ activist, and film producer
- Tracey Ullman, comedian
