= Joseph Anthony Kelly =

English photojournalist, editor, and public theologian (born 1958)

Joseph Anthony Kelly (born 1958) is an English Catholic publisher, editor and public theologian. He is the editor and publisher of The Official Catholic Directory of England & Wales and managing editor of The Edit Partnership Ltd.

Kelly was born in Perivale, Middlesex on 10 August 1958. He lived in Tadley, Hampshire and Tilehurst, Reading and attended Presentation College, Reading, and later as a mature student read English at Ruskin College, Oxford and gained a Postgraduate Masters in Religions and Theology at Manchester University.

Kelly trained as a photographer and worked in a number of south of England studios, before moving to London to work as a freelance photojournalist for the national press. He was awarded The Irish Post Photojournalism Award in 1982.

He moved to north Wales in 1987 to become editor of Country Quest, the magazine for Wales, before moving on to edit New Lines, the Welsh Arts Council literary review, and then worked as deputy editor on the Wrexham Leader, editor of the Deeside Midweek Leader and was music editor on the North Wales Evening Leader.

In 1994 he moved to The Catholic Universe national weekly newspaper as deputy editor, then edited Catholic Life magazine for twelve months, before returning as editor of The Catholic Universe – a position he held for 26 years until the company went into liquidation on 29 June 2021, following the UK government's decision to close all Catholic churches – and effectively the company's distribution network – due to the COVID-19 pandemic. Kelly was the longest serving editor in the paper's 160-year history.

In 2008 Kelly was one of a five person team who completed a management buy-out of the company, after which he became Managing Editor, and the CEO of the Universe Media Group Ltd.

In 2009 Kelly was editor and compiler of a hardback publication – From the Archives of The Universe Catholic Weekly – which included many photographs and historial details from the newspaper's 150 year old archive, and was the outcome of a four year project initiated and overseen by Kelly to preserve The Universe's unique Catholic picture library.

In 2010 Kelly commissioned the National Museum of Wales to create an exact replica of a historic Catholic book Y Drych Cristianogawl, the first book printed in Wales (1586), as a gift from the people of Wales for Pope Benedict XVI. This was presented to the Pope at a Mass in Westminster Cathedral during his 2010 UK visit, and is now kept in the Vatican Library.

In July 2021 Kelly set up The Edit Partnership Ltd, and is editor of The Official Catholic Directory of England & Wales and Agora Journal architecture magazine.

He served for five years on CADW's Historic Buildings Conservation Committee and is an Affiliate Member of the Royal Institute of British Architects (RIBA). He is also a member of the Royal Photographic Society, and a past Chairman (North West) of the Society of Editors.

In November 2022 The Catholic Herald named Kelly as one of their "UK Catholic Leaders of Today".

On 1 August 2024 Kelly was also appointed Diocesan Archivist for the Roman Catholic Diocese of Wrexham.
