= Licensed Trade Charity =

British charitable organization

The Licensed Trade Charity (LTC) is a registered charity in the United Kingdom that cares for people working in, or retired from, the licensed drink trade and their dependents.

It is constituted as a registered charity under English law, and its headquarters are in Ascot, Berkshire.

It was founded by a royal charter of 3 May 1836 as the Society of Licensed Victuallers and adopted the working name Licensed Trade Charity in 2004 following a merger with the Licensed Victuallers National Homes charity.

== Activities ==
Amongst the activities of the charity are the provision of financial assistance, convalescence care and retirement housing. It is a shareholder in the publisher of the Morning Advertiser, the journal of the licensed trade.

In 1867, the Licensed Victuallers Lifeboat Fund provided a self-righting 'pulling and sailing' (P&S) lifeboat for the Royal National Lifeboat Institution (RNLI), to be stationed at Hunstanton in Norfolk. A second lifeboat was funded in 1887. A third one followed in 1900, which remained in service until 1931, when the station closed. All three lifeboats bore the name Licensed Victualler. Over the period of 64 years service, the lifeboats were launched on 54 occasions, saving 117 lives.

=== Schools ===
The Licensed Trade Charity operates three schools which are also open to the general public: Licensed Victuallers' School near Ascot, Berkshire, an independent all-ability school for students from 4–18, as well as LVS Hassocks and LVS Oxford, both specialist schools for young people with autism.

== See also ==
- List of organisations in the United Kingdom with a royal charter
- List of organisations with a British royal charter
- Worshipful Company of Innholders
