= Southend-on-Sea Lifeboat Station =

RNLI Lifeboat station in Essex, England

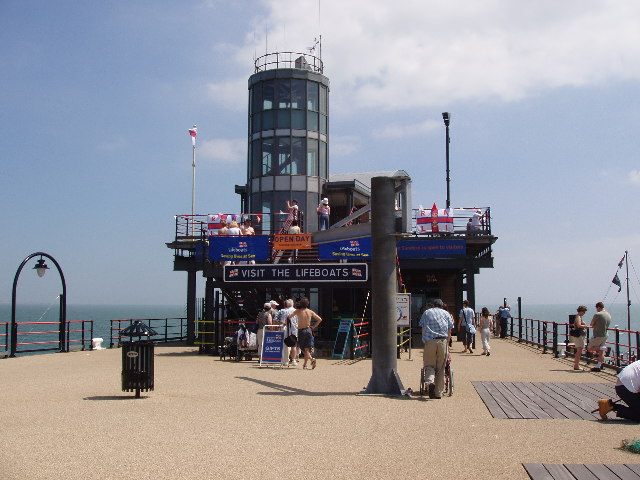
- Lifeboat station at the end of Southend Pier.

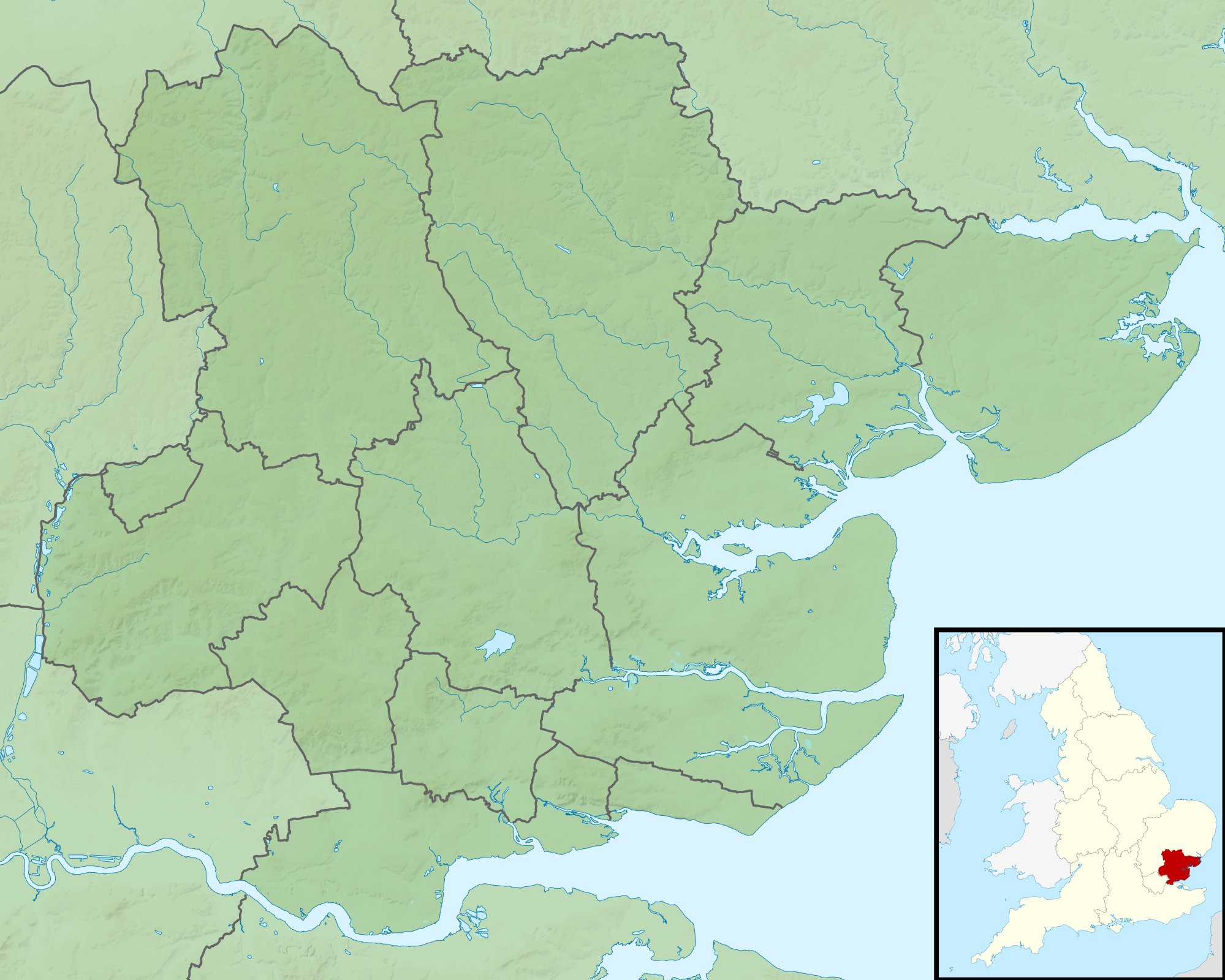
- Location within Essex

General information
- Type: RNLI Lifeboat Station
- Location: Southend-on-Sea lifeboat station, Southend Pier,, Southend-on-Sea, Essex, SS1 1EE, England
- Coordinates: 51°31′56.6″N 0°42′59.0″E
- Opened: 1879
- Owner: Royal National Lifeboat Institution

Website
- Southend-on-sea RNLI Lifeboat Station

Southend-on-Sea lifeboat station is a lifeboat station at Southend-on-Sea in the English county of Essex, operated by the Royal National Lifeboat Institution (RNLI) since 1879.

Because of the large tidal range and extensive drying foreshore at Southend, the lifeboat station uses two boathouses.

The first of these is situated at the head (outer end) of the 1.34-mile (2.16 km) long Southend Pier, and houses a B-class (Atlantic 85) lifeboat and a smaller D-class (IB1) lifeboat, both of which are launched by davit into the deep water adjoining the pier.

The second boathouse is situated adjacent to the inshore end of the pier, and houses a second D-class IB1 lifeboat together with a H class hovercraft, both of which are launched down an adjacent slipway.

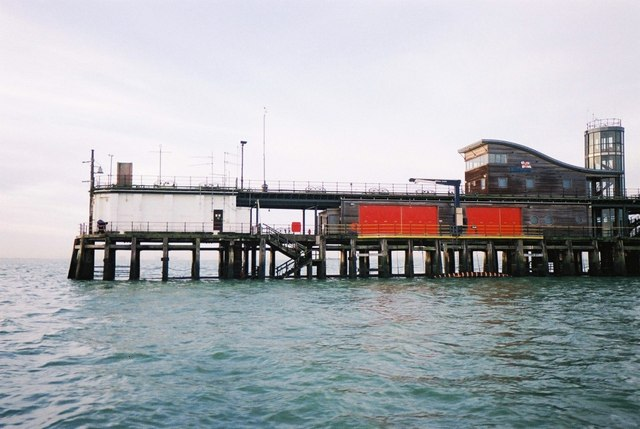
The pier head lifeboat station (the lifeboats are stored behind the red doors, and are launched by the davits)

The pier-head lifeboat house is a modern structure, which incorporates crew accommodation and offices, an RNLI shop, and a viewing gallery from which visitors can view the lifeboats. It is topped by a sun deck to which the public have access. Lifeboat crews use an electric buggy, complete with sirens and blue flashing lights, to access this boathouse along the pier from the shore.

== History ==
Following application by local residents, and a report by the RNLI Inspector of Lifeboats, it was resolved at a meeting of the RNLI committee of management on 5 June 1879, to establish a station at Southend-on-Sea.

It was recognised that launching a lifeboat at Southend, with the large flat expanse of shoreline, would take considerable time. The Institution were grateful that the Southend Pier Company afforded every possible assistance in allowing a lifeboat to be stationed at the end of the pier, supported on davits. A 25-foot self-righting 'Pulling and Sailing' (P&S) lifeboat, one with sails and (8) oars, was provided to the station, the cost of £352-18s-5d defrayed by the gift of £300 from Edwin J. Brett, raised through his weekly periodical magazine Boys of England. At a ceremony on the 13 November 1879, in front of a large crowd, the station was declared open, and the lifeboat named Boys of England and Edwin J. Brett.

At a further meeting of the RNLI committee of management on 6 March 1884, it was decided that a second shore based station be established at Southend, for a lifeboat which could be transported along the shore to neighbouring sandbanks, should the need arise. A new 34-foot self-righting (P&S) lifeboat was provided, its cost defrayed from the legacy of the late Mrs. Frances Sophia Smith, of Lisheen, County Cork, in memory of her two sons. On 8 October 1885, the lifeboat was named Theodore and Herbert (ON 33).

The No. 2 boathouse, long since demolished, was located behind Marine Parade on Hartington Road, at the junction to what is now the entrance to Seaway Car Park.

The first motor lifeboat arrived in 1928. In 1935, a new lifeboat house with slipway was erected at the pier head. In 1940, the lifeboat Greater London (Civil Service No.3) (ON 704) was one of the 19 lifeboats which assisted in the evacuation of Dunkirk.

In 1955 what would prove to be Southend's final All-weather lifeboat went on station. The newly built Greater London II (Civil Service No.30), a 46-foot 9in Watson-class, entered service on 3 April. From then until 1968, the Thames Estuary was covered by three similar slipway launched 46-foot 9in Watsons stationed on seaside piers at Clacton-on-Sea, Margate and Southend-on-Sea. Clacton's Watson was replaced by a 37-foot Oakley-class lifeboat in 1968.

In response to an increasing amount of water-based leisure activity, the RNLI placed 25 small fast Inshore lifeboats around the country. These were easily launched with just a few people, ideal to respond quickly to local emergencies. More followed, and in 1966, a D-class (RFD PB16) Inshore lifeboat was placed at Southend.

In 1969, the RNLI placed two extra lifeboats on the Thames Estuary, following a decision by the RAF to withdraw the rescue helicopters from RAF Manston. An extra D-class lifeboat went to Southend-on-Sea, and it was decided to place an All-weather lifeboat at Sheerness on evaluation.

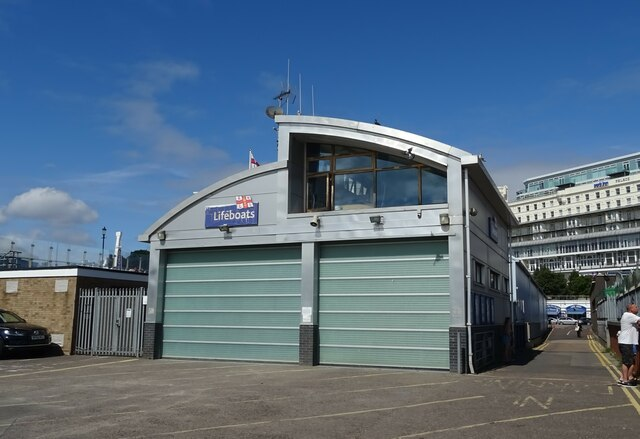
Southend-on-Sea 'Dry End' Station

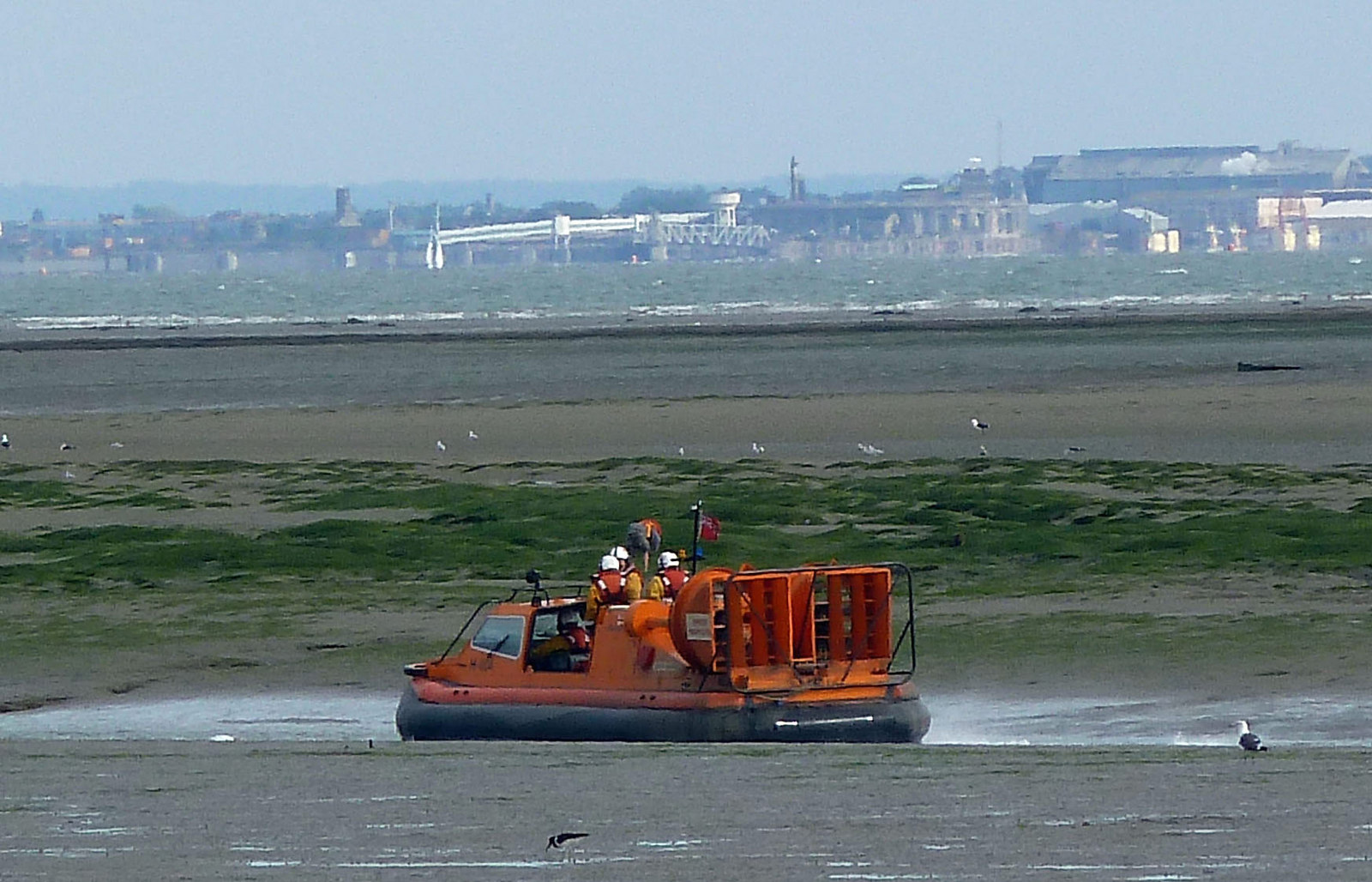
Southend hovercraft Vera Ravine (H-004)

By the early 1970s, two inflatable inshore lifeboats were in use at Southend to provide assistance to the increasing number of pleasure craft.

In 1974, Sheerness was allocated a fast Waveney-class lifeboat, and two years later, the Southend All-weather Watson-class lifeboat was withdrawn and replaced by the Inshore Atlantic 21-class Percy Garon (B-527). This was initially kept in the 1935 pier head boathouse, but in 1986 the coaster Kings Abbey sliced through the pier and lifeboat slipway, badly damaging the lifeboat house. A temporary station was quickly re-established at the pierhead, and officially opened by HRH Princess Anne in 1991. This temporary station was used until 2002, when today's modern boathouse was opened.

A new 'Dry End' shore boathouse was completed on 16 July 2013, to accommodate the hovercraft, Vera Ravine (H-004), and second Inshore D-class lifeboat.

== Percy Garon MC GM ==
Two Southend lifeboats have been named in recognition of Percy Garon MC GM (1890-1987). Garon was awarded a Military Cross for his work on the Matandu River during World War One. Invalided out of the military with cerebral malaria, he recovered to join Southend Fire Brigade, becoming Chief Officer in 1934. During World War II, he became Essex Fire Brigade Force Commander, and was awarded the George Medal for pioneering work dealing with oil fires. Percy Garon was Honorary Secretary of Southend-On-Sea Lifeboat Station from 1952-1975.

== Station honours ==
The following are awards made at Southend-on-Sea:

- RNIPLS Silver Medal

George Culmer, Chief Officer, H.M. Coastguard, Shoeburyness – 1826

Lt. Sidney King, RN, H.M. Coastguard, Shoeburyness – 1838

- RNLI Silver Medal

William Bradley, Light Keeper at Southend Pierhead – 1887

Sidney Harry Bartlett Page, Coxswain – 1941

- RNLI Bronze Medal

Sidney Harry Bartlett Page, Coxswain – 1938

Sidney Harry Bartlett Page, Coxswain – 1938 (Second Service clasp)

Frank Arthur Jurgenson, Mechanic – 1941
William Arthur Deer, Second Coxswain – 1941
Herbert George Myall, Bowman – 1941
Samuel Horace Gilson Thomas, Signalman – 1941
Reginald Herbert Sanders, Assistant Mechanic – 1941

Robert Terence Fossett, Helm – 1982

John Foster, Helm – 2000

- The Walter and Elizabeth Groombridge Award 1999
  (for the outstanding inshore lifeboat rescue of the year)

John Foster, Helm – 2000
Michael Whistler, crew member – 2000
Ian Rees, crew member – 2000

- The Thanks of the Institution inscribed on Vellum

Sidney Page, Coxswain – 1947
Joseph Polkinghorn, Second Coxswain – 1947
Lionel Neville, Reserve Mechanic – 1947
Reginald Sanders, Assistant Mechanic – 1947
Samuel Thomas, Signalman – 1947
Edward Polkinghorn, crew member – 1947
Oliver Cotgrove, crew member – 1947
Thomas Thornton, crew member – 1947
Stanley Scrase, crew member – 1947
Cyril Day, crew member – 1947
Walter Wynn, crew member – 1947

Sidney Page, Coxswain – 1955

Coxswain P. Gilson and his Crew – 1962

Robert Chalk – 1968
Gordon Easton – 1968
D. Morgan – 1968

Robert T. Fossett, Helm – 1977

Carl Palmby – 1981

Paul Gilson, Helm – 1990

Paul Gilson, Helm – 1992

Michael Whistler, crew member – 2000
Ian Rees, crew member – 2000

- A Framed Letter of Thanks signed by the Chairman of the Institution

Duncan Clark, Helm – 1971
Clifton Warry, crew member – 1971
Harry Pavitt, crew member – 1971
Dennis Webb, Helm – 1971
Stephen Cox, crew member – 1971

Robert Chalk, Motor Mechanic – 1974

Paul Gilson, Helm – 1981
Glyn Gilson, crew member – 1981
Paul Manners, crew member – 1981

Simon Spratt, crew member – 1982
Mark Fossett, crew member – 1982

Robert Fossett, Helm – 1990
Mark Fossett, crew member – 1990
Roy Kidwell, crew member – 1990

John Foster, crew member – 1990
Clifton Warry, crew member – 1990

Clifton Warry, crew member – 1992
Duncan Clark, crew member – 1992

Southend Lifeboat Station – 1999

John Foster, Helm – 2001

Stewart Olley, Helm (B776) – 2002
Michael Whistler, Helm (D527) – 2002

- Testimonial on Vellum, awarded by the Royal Humane Society

Robert Chalk, Motor Mechanic – 1974

- Certificate of Commendation, awarded by the Royal Humane Society

Paul Gilson, Helm – 1984
Michael Whistler, crew member – 1984

- Southend Borough Council Mitchell Cup
  awarded annually for an outstanding act of personal courage
  within the county borough of Southend-on-Sea

John Foster, Helm – 2000
Michael Whistler, crew member – 2000
Ian Rees, crew member – 2000

- Member, Order of the British Empire (MBE)

Colin Adrian Reginald Sedgwick, Lifeboat Operations Manager – 2013NYH

Michael James Whistler – 2021NYH

James Mackie, J.P., Chair, Lifeboat Management Group – 2022NYH

== Southend-on-Sea lifeboats ==
=== Pulling and Sailing (P&S) lifeboats ===
ON (Note: ON is the RNLI's Official Number of the boat.)	Name	Built	On station	Class	Comments
Pre-646	Boys of England and Edwin J. Brett	1879	1879–1889	24-foot Self-righting (P&S)	(Note: 25-foot x 7-foot 3in (8-oared) self-righting (P&S) lifeboat, gift of the 'Boys of England' magazine LB fund, built by Woolfe of Shadwell, London, costing £363.)
33	Theodore & Herbert (Southend No.2)	1885	1885–1899	34-foot Self-righting (P&S)	(Note: 34-foot x 7-foot 6in (10-oared) self-righting (P&S) lifeboat, legacy of Mrs F. S. Smith of Lisheen, County Cork, built by Woolfe of Shadwell, London, costing £300.)
259	Boys of England and Edwin J. Brett	1882	1889–1891	25-foot Self-righting (P&S)	(Note: 25-foot x 7-foot 3in (8/10-oared) self-righting (P&S) lifeboat, gift of the 'Boys of England' magazine LB fund, built by Woolfe of Shadwell, London, costing £266 when new.); Previously William James Holt at Weston-super-Mare.
430	James Stevens No.9	1899	1899–1923	38-foot Norfolk and Suffolk (P&S)	(Note: 38-foot x 12-foot (12-oared) Norfolk and Suffolk-class non-self-righting (P&S) lifeboat, legacy of Mr J. Stevens of Birmingham, built by Thames Ironworks of Blackwall, London, costing £865.)
505	Reserve No.7C	1903	1923−1924	40-foot Watson (P&S)	(Note: 40-foot x 11-foot (12-oared) Watson-class non-self-righting (P&S) lifeboat, legacy of Mr W. Roberts of Manchester, built by Thames Ironworks of Blackwall, London, costing £1,606.); Previously William Roberts at Little Haven.
535	Charlie Medland	1904	1924−1928	43-foot Watson (P&S)	(Note: 43-foot x 12-foot 6in (10-oared) Watson-class non-self-righting (P&S) lifeboat, legacy of Mr C. Medland of Clapham, built by Thames Ironworks of Blackwall, London, costing £1,694.); Previously at The Mumbles

Pre ON numbers are unofficial numbers used by the Lifeboat Enthusiasts' Society to reference early lifeboats not included on the official RNLI list.

=== All-weather lifeboats ===
ON	Name	Built	On station	Class	Comments
704	Greater London (Civil Service No.3)	1928–	1928−1941	Ramsgate	
694	J. B. Proudfoot	1924	1941−1945	45-foot Watson	Reserve lifeboat. Previously H.F. Bailey at Cromer
704	Greater London (Civil Service No.3)	1928	1945−1955	Ramsgate	
921	Greater London II (Civil Service No.30)	1955	1955−1976	46-foot 9in Watson	

All-weather lifeboat withdrawn, 1976

=== Hovercraft ===
Op. No. (Note: Op. No. is the RNLI's Operational Number of the boat carried on the hull.)	Name	On station	Class	Comments
H-004	Vera Ravine	2004−	Hovercraft	

=== Inshore lifeboats ===
==== D-class lifeboats ====
Op. No.	Name	On station	Class	Comments
D-21	Unnamed	1965	D-class (RFD PB16)	
D-60	Unnamed	1965−1966	D-class (Dunlop)	
D-61	Unnamed	1966	D-class (Dunlop)	
D-35	Unnamed	1966	D-class (RFD PB16)	
D-7	Unnamed	1967	D-class (RFD PB16)	
D-63	Unnamed	1967	D-class (Dunlop)	
D-62	Unnamed	1967−1969	D-class (Dunlop)	
D-128	Unnamed	1967−1970	D-class (RFD PB16)	
D-158	Unnamed	1969−1975	D-class (RFD PB16)	
D-28	Unnamed	1970	D-class (RFD PB16)	
D-91	Unnamed	1970–1971	D-class (RFD PB16)	
D-146	Unnamed	1970−1975	D-class (RFD PB16)	
D-28	Unnamed	1972	D-class (RFD PB16)	
D-150	Unnamed	1975−1976	D-class (RFD PB16)	
D-236	Unnamed	1975−1987	D-class (Zodiac III)	
D-225	Unnamed	1986–1987	D-class (Zodiac III)	
D-349	Unnamed	1987−1995	D-class (EA16)	
D-341	Unnamed	1988	D-class (Zodiac III)	
D-368	Douglas Cameron	1988−1997	D-class (EA16)	
D-341	Unnamed	1989	D-class (Zodiac III)	
D-487	Foresters London Pride	1995−2005	D-class (EA16)	
D-527	Ethel Royal	1997−2007	D-class (EA16)	
D-633	Pride of London Foresters	2005−2014	D-class (IB1)	
D-682	The Essex Freemason	2007−2017	D-class (IB1)	
D-771	William Henderson	2014−2025	D-class (IB1)	
D-818	Len Thorne GM DFC	2018−	D-class (IB1)	
D-904	Sue Sorotos	2025−	D-class (IB1)	

==== B-Class lifeboats ====
Op. No.	Name	On station	Class	Comments
B-527	Percy Garon (Civil Service)	1976−1986	B-class (Atlantic 21)	
B-567	Percy Garon II	1986−2001	B-class (Atlantic 21)	In service as 'R-9' with Bote Salvavidas de Iquique, Chile, January 2026
B-776	Vic and Billie Whiffen	2001−2015	B-class (Atlantic 75)	
B-755	London's Anniversary 175	2015−2016	B-class (Atlantic 75)	
B-885	Julia & Angus Wright	2016−	B-class (Atlantic 85)	

== See also ==
- List of RNLI stations
- List of former RNLI stations
- Royal National Lifeboat Institution lifeboats
