= List of RNLB lifeboats =

This is a list of notable RNLB coastal rescue lifeboats.

Where applicable, their Official Number (or 'ON') is also given.

- RNLB Anna Livia (ON 1200)
- RNLB Lucy Lavers (ON 832)
- RNLB Forester’s Centenary (ON 786)
- RNLB Manchester Unity of Oddfellows (ON 960)
- RNLB J C Madge (ON 536)
- RNLB Alfred Corry (ON 353)
- RNLB Jesse Lumb (ON 822)
- RNLB Thomas McCunn (ON 759)
- RNLB Benjamin Bond Cabbell (ON 12)
- RNLB Aguila Wren (ON 892)
- RNLB Helen Smitton (ON 603)
- RNLB William and Kate Johnstone (ON 682)
- RNLB H F Bailey (ON 670)
- RNLB H F Bailey (ON 694)
- RNLB H F Bailey II (ON 714)
- RNLB H F Bailey III (ON 777)
- RNLB Henry Blogg (ON 840)
- RNLB Louisa Heartwell (ON 495)
- RNLB Mona (ON 775)
- RNLB Lester (ON 1287)
- RNLB Ruby and Arthur Reed II (ON 1097)
- RNLB Mary Stanford (ON 661)
- RNLB Mary Stanford (ON 733)
- RNLB Harriot Dixon (ON 770)
- RNLB Lloyds II (ON 986)
- RNLB Ruby and Arthur Reed (ON 990)
- RNLB The Oddfellows (B-818)
- RNLB Cecil Paine (ON 850)
- RNLB Manchester Unity of Oddfellows (B-702)
- RNLB B-536
- RNLB William Bennett (ON 11)
- RNLB Duncan
- RNLB Guide of Dunkirk (ON 826)
- RNLB Lord Southborough (Civil Service No. 1) (ON 688)
- RNLB Abdy Beauclerk (ON 751)
- RNLB Julia Park Barry of Glasgow (ON 819)
- RNLB Spirit of Lowestoft (ON 1132)
- RNLB Freddie Cooper (ON 1193)
- RNLB Keith Anderson (ON 1106)
- RNLB Margaret Russell Fraser (ON 1108)
- RNLB Queen Victoria
- RNLB Emma Constance (ON 693)
- RNLB Sir William Hillary (ON 725)

== See also ==
- Royal National Lifeboat Institution (RNLI)
