= RNLB H F Bailey =

Several lifeboats of the RNLI have been named RNLB H F Bailey,

- RNLB H F Bailey (ON 670), a Norfolk and Suffolk-class lifeboat that served at Cromer during 1923 & 1924.
- RNLB H F Bailey (ON 694), a Watson-class lifeboat that served at Cromer from 1924 until 1935.
- RNLB H F Bailey II (ON 714), a Watson-class lifeboat that served at Cromer from 1929 until 1937.
- RNLB H F Bailey III (ON 777), a Watson-class lifeboat that served at Cromer from 1935 until 1945.
