= SS Meriones =

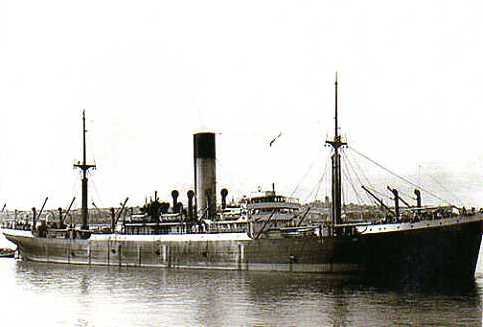
- Meriones

History

United Kingdom
- Name: Meriones
- Namesake: Meriones
- Owner: China Mutual Steam Nav Co Ltd
- Operator: Alfred Holt & Co
- Port of registry: Liverpool
- Builder: Palmers Sb and Iron Co, Hebburn
- Yard number: 921
- Launched: 19 August 1921
- Completed: September 1922
- Identification: UK official number 145974; Code letters KMSP (until 1933); Call sign GBCK (1934 onward)
- Fate: Wrecked 25 January 1941

General characteristics
- Type: Refrigerated cargo ship
- Tonnage: 1930: 7,671 GRT, 4,808 NRT; 1934: 7,557 GRT, 4,739 NRT
- Length: 459.7 ft (140.1 m)
- Beam: 58.4 ft (17.8 m)
- Depth: 26.2 ft (8.0 m)
- Decks: 2
- Installed power: 6,000 SHP
- Propulsion: 2 × steam turbines; 1 × screw
- Speed: 14.5 knots (27 km/h)
- Capacity: 111,000 cubic feet (3,143 m^{3})
- Sensors & processing systems: from 1934: wireless direction finding
- Notes: One of a class of 11 sister ships

SS Meriones was a Blue Funnel Line refrigerated cargo steamship. She was launched in 1921 on the River Tyne as one of a class of 11 ships to replace many of Blue Funnel's losses in the First World War.

In 1941 the Second World War Meriones became stranded on a sandbank in the North Sea. An attempt to salvage her was disrupted by enemy air attacks, and she became a total loss.

Blue Funnel Line named its ships after characters from Greek mythology. Meriones was a warrior in Homer's Iliad.

== A new class of Blue Funnel Line ships ==
Blue Funnel Line lost 16 ships in the First World War. Thereafter the company replaced its fleet, mainly with a class of 11 new steamships of about 460 ft (140 m) registered length, 58 ft (18 m) beam and tonnage of about 7,500 GRT, all launched between 1920 and 1923.

Blue Funnel ordered members of the new class from five different shipyards. Palmers Shipbuilding and Iron Company built two: Automedon at Jarrow and Meriones at Hebburn, both launched in 1921.

Palmers launched Meriones on 19 August 1921 and completed her in September 1922. Like most members of the class she was powered by two steam turbines, which drove a single screw via double reduction gearing. Between them her turbines developed 6,000 SHP and gave her a speed of 14.5 knots (27 km/h). Her holds had refrigerated space for 111,000 cubic feet (3,143 m^{3}) of cargo.

In 1934 Automedon's code letters KMSP were superseded by the call sign GBCK, and she was fitted with wireless direction finding.

== Second World War service ==
In the Second World War Meriones mostly sailed unescorted. In November 1939 she sailed in Convoy HG 7 from Port Said to Liverpool. In May 1940 she sailed in Convoy SL 32 from Freetown in Sierra Leone to Liverpool.

== Grounding ==
In January 1941 Meriones had partly loaded a mixed cargo for Brisbane, and joined a convoy heading from London to Hull on her way to load the rest of her cargo. Her cargo included cement, sodium nitrate, manganese, tinplate and a large quantity of cable and machinery. Also aboard were two racehorses owned by the Duke of Gloucester, who had recently been appointed Governor-General of Australia. Meriones' complement numbered 101 including her Master, crew and passengers.

On 22 January 1941 Meriones struck the wreck of the cargo ship Monte Nevoso, which had grounded and sunk on South Haisborough Bank in 1932. Meriones became grounded upon the wreck, and her number six hold filled with water.

On 24 January Great Yarmouth Port and Haven Commissioners' 122 GRT salvage tug Richard Lee Barber took pumps to try to refloat Meriones. Richard Lee Barber carried a salvage officer, Blue Funnel Line's marine superintendent, Captain Glazier, and Coxswain Henry Blogg of the Cromer Lifeboat, who had the best knowledge of Haisborough Sands.

Meanwhile, German aircraft attacked Meriones. One attack was made as Richard Lee Barber approached Haisborough Sands, but was eventually repelled by gunners on nearby ships. An attack at 1415 hrs wounded one of Meriones' DEMS gunners. Another attack at 1600 hrs dropped bombs which fell very near Meriones. German aircraft dropped a total of 23 bombs in three attacks on the ship.

At 1516 hrs the Cromer lifeboat was called. H F Bailey was launched at 1534 hrs, commanded by Second Coxswain Lewis Harrison. She reached Meriones about 1830 hrs and went alongside Richard Lee Barber. Blogg rejoined H F Bailey and took Captain Glazier aboard Meriones. H F Bailey then stood by.

== Rescue ==
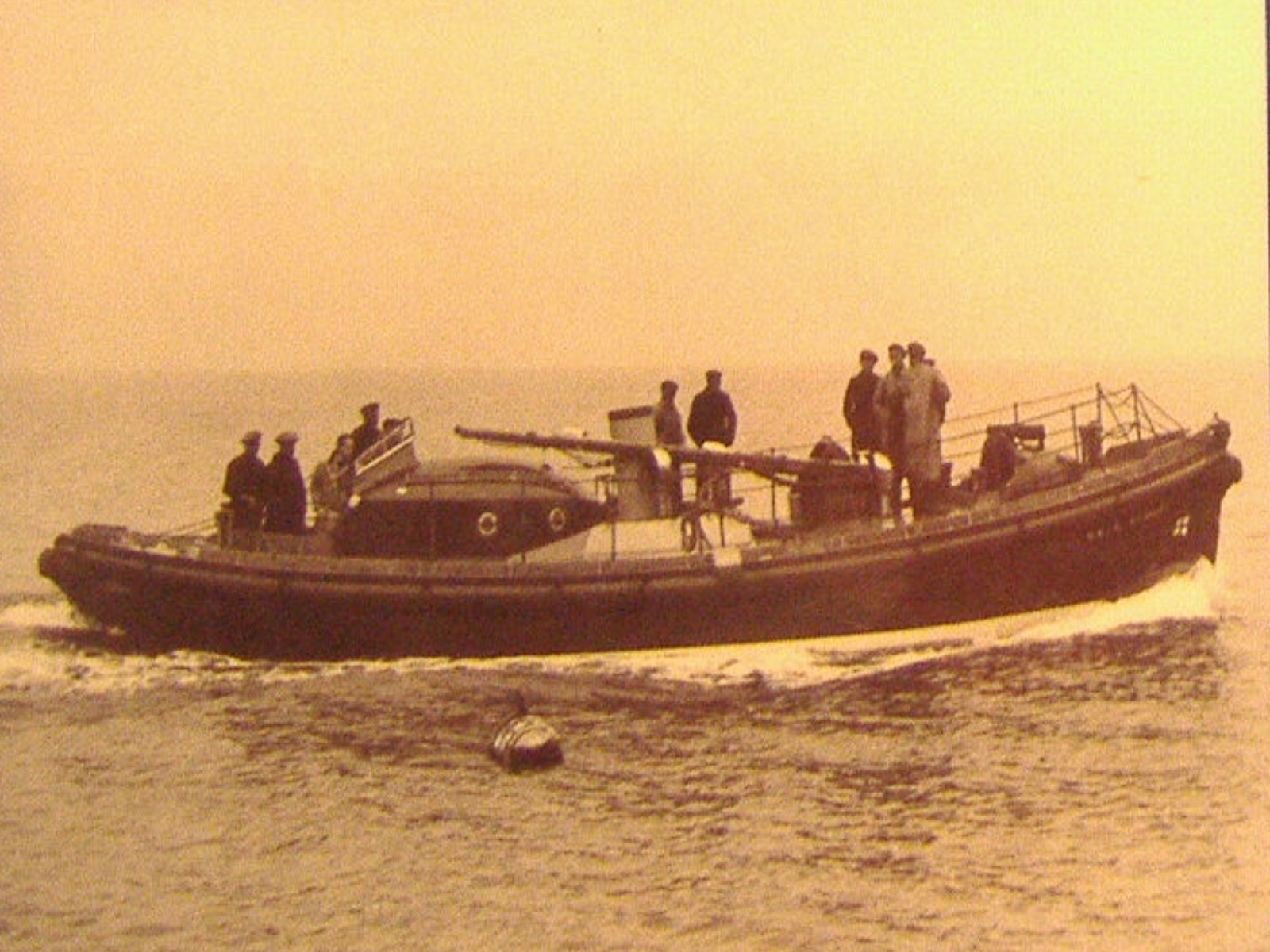
Cromer Lifeboat H F Bailey

The sea had been moderate, with an east-northeasterly wind. But now the wind increased and the sea started to break over Haisborough Sands. Meriones' crew's quarters were awash, and the two horse boxes had broken loose. Meriones asked H F Bailey to rescue her crew.

H F Bailey positioned herself in the lee of Meriones and, after several attempts, was made fast to the ship with large ropes. She took half of Meriones' crew to the Royal Navy tug Saint Mullion which was anchored nearby. She then returned to Meriones, took off another 40 crew, but then the 6-inch (150 mm) and 9-inch (230 mm) ropes that had secured H F Bailey to Meriones broke. H F Bailey took the 40 men to Richard Lee Barber, which was now at anchor within the sands.

Eight men now remained on Meriones: her Master and officers. The Duke's racehorses could not be rescued, so one of the officers shot them. H F Bailey took the last men off Meriones at about 0100 hrs on 26 January. H F Bailey was also carrying the ship's doctor from Meriones, and the gunner who had been wounded in one of the air attacks, and who was now on a stretcher.

There was now heavy rain mixed with sleet. Heavy seas were running both on shore and on the sand banks. In the darkness Blogg was uncertain of H F Bailey's position, so Blogg took her to the deeper waters of Cockle Gat south of Haisborough Sands, and anchored for the rest of the night.

After five and a half hours it was light enough to fix H F Bailey's position from the tower of the parish church of Winterton-on-Sea two miles to the south. H F Bailey weighed anchor and at 1015 hrs she reached Great Yarmouth to land the last 10 rescued men.

== Loss of Meriones ==
During 26 January 1941 German aircraft attacked Meriones again, setting her afire. By 27 January she was beyond salvage. Her wreck now lies on South Haisborough Bank next to that of Monte Nevoso at a depth of 19 m (62 ft) at position 52°51′N 01°45′E. The two wrecks are 10.3 nautical miles (19.1 km) north by northeast of Hemsby, 12.0 nautical miles (22.3 km) north of Caister-on-Sea and 13.0 nautical miles (24.1 km) north of Great Yarmouth.

== Bibliography ==
- Bensley, Mick (2001). The Rescues of Henry Blogg and the crews of the Cromer Lifeboat. Benginn. ISBN 1-85770-229-8.
- Jolly, C (2002). Henry Blogg, the Greatest of the Lifeboatmen. North Walsham: Poppyland Publishing. ISBN 0-946148-59-7.
- Le Fleming, HM (1961). Ships of the Blue Funnel Line. Southampton: Adlard Coles Ltd.
- Malster, Bob; Stibbons, Peter (1986). The Cromer Lifeboats, 1804–1986. North Walsham: Poppyland Publishing. ISBN 0-946148-21-X.
- Tikus, Ayer (2003). The Ship-Wrecks off North East Norfolk. Ayer Tikus Publications. ASIN B0032Z2NU0.
- Harwich and Rotterdam to Cromer & Terschelling Admiralty Small Craft Chart (Map). 1:300,000. small craft charts. United Kingdom Hydrographic Office.
