= SS Monte Nevoso =

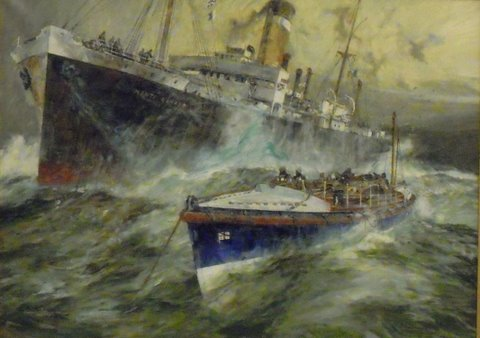
- Rescue to the ship SS Monte Nevoso oil painting, artist unknown

History

Italy
- Name: Monte Nevoso
- Namesake: Monte Nevoso
- Owner: 1920: Lloyd Adriatico Soc di Nav; 1929: SA Coop di Nav 'Garibaldi'
- Port of registry: Venice
- Builder: Northumberland Sb Co, Howdon
- Yard number: 257
- Launched: 24 November 1920
- Sponsored by: December 1920
- Identification: code letters NZKU
- Fate: Wrecked 14 October 1932

General characteristics
- Type: Cargo ship
- Tonnage: 1920: 5,889 GRT, 3,590 NRT; 1932: 5,843 GRT, 3,590 NRT
- Length: 399.9 ft (121.9 m)
- Beam: 52.9 ft (16.1 m)
- Depth: 32.8 ft (10.0 m)
- Decks: 1
- Installed power: 572 NHP
- Propulsion: 3-cylinder triple-expansion engine
- Speed: 11.5 knots (21.3 km/h)
- Crew: 33
- Notes: sister ship: Monte Santo

SS Monte Nevoso was a cargo steamship that was launched in 1920 in England, owned in Italy, and wrecked in 1932 in the North Sea off the coast of Norfolk.

Her wreck was a hazard to navigation, and in 1941 the refrigerated cargo ship Meriones was wrecked on it.

== Building and ownership ==
The Northumberland Shipbuilding Company built Monte Nevoso at Howdon on the River Tyne, launching her on 24 November and completing her that December. She was a sister ship for Monte Santo, which the Northumberland Shipbuilding Co had built earlier that year.

Each ship had a three-cylinder triple-expansion steam engine that was rated at 572 NHP, but they came from different builders. Richardsons Westgarth & Company built Monte Santo's engine, and the Wallsend Slipway & Engineering Company built Monte Nevoso's engine.

The first owner of both ships was Lloyd Adriatico Società di Navigazione. In 1929 ownership of both Monte Santo and Monte Nevoso passed to Società Anonima Cooperativa di Navigazione 'Garibaldi'.

== Final voyage and grounding ==
Early in October 1932 Monte Nevoso left the port of La Plata, Argentina with a cargo of wheat, maize and linseed for Europe. 300 nautical miles (560 km) off Land's End she was ordered by wireless to proceed to Hull to discharge her cargo.

Monte Nevoso steamed up the English Channel and through the Strait of Dover into the North Sea. At 0300 hrs on 14 October her deck officer on watch sighted the Newarp lightship, 6 nautical miles (11 km) from the ship off the coast of Norfolk.

Her Master, Captain Angelino Solvatore, and his chief officer were in her chart room studying charts of the Haisborough buoys, and the chief officer recommended that they steer a course more to port to avoid the flood tide carrying them farther starboard. As they spoke it was reported from the bridge that there was a light on the port bow. Solvatore and his chief officer checked this sighting from the port rail. Realising that Monte Nevoso was now by the South Middle Haisborough Light, Solvatore ordered the helmsman to turn hard to port, as the ship needed to be starboard of the buoy for a safe passage. No sooner had he given the order, than he got a reply that the ship would not answer the helm. By 0400 hrs it was clear that Monte Nevoso was aground on South Haisborough Bank.

== Attempts to save the ship ==
Monte Nevoso spent four hours trying unsuccessfully to get off the sandbank under her own power. Then at 0800 hrs her wireless operator signalled the Humber radio station asking for a tug to assist. At 0930 hrs HM Coastguard at Gorleston-on-Sea alerted Cromer Lifeboat Station, which launched the lifeboat H F Bailey. L Smit & Co's salvage tug Noordzee, which was based in Great Yarmouth, also reached Monte Nevoso.

The lifeboat coxswain, Henry Blogg, and the salvage tug captain, Martin van der Hidde, boarded Monte Nevoso. Blogg warned Solvatore that the weather was to change for the worse. Solvatore was reluctant to let Noordzee try to pull his ship off the bank, until at 1630 hrs he was persuaded when a crack appeared in Monte Nevoso's deck over her bunker.

With H F Bailey's help, a line was secured between Monte Nevoso's stern and Noordzee. Monte Nevoso ran her engine astern as Noordzee pulled, but the ship did not move. Van der Hidde summoned five more tugs. Smit's Gele Zee, the United Towing Company's Irishman, Scotsman and Yorkshireman and a tug called Hermies arrived, and H F Bailey passed their towing lines to Monte Nevoso. Late in the afternoon all six tugs together tried to pull Monte Nevoso free, but she did not move.

== Rescue of the crew ==
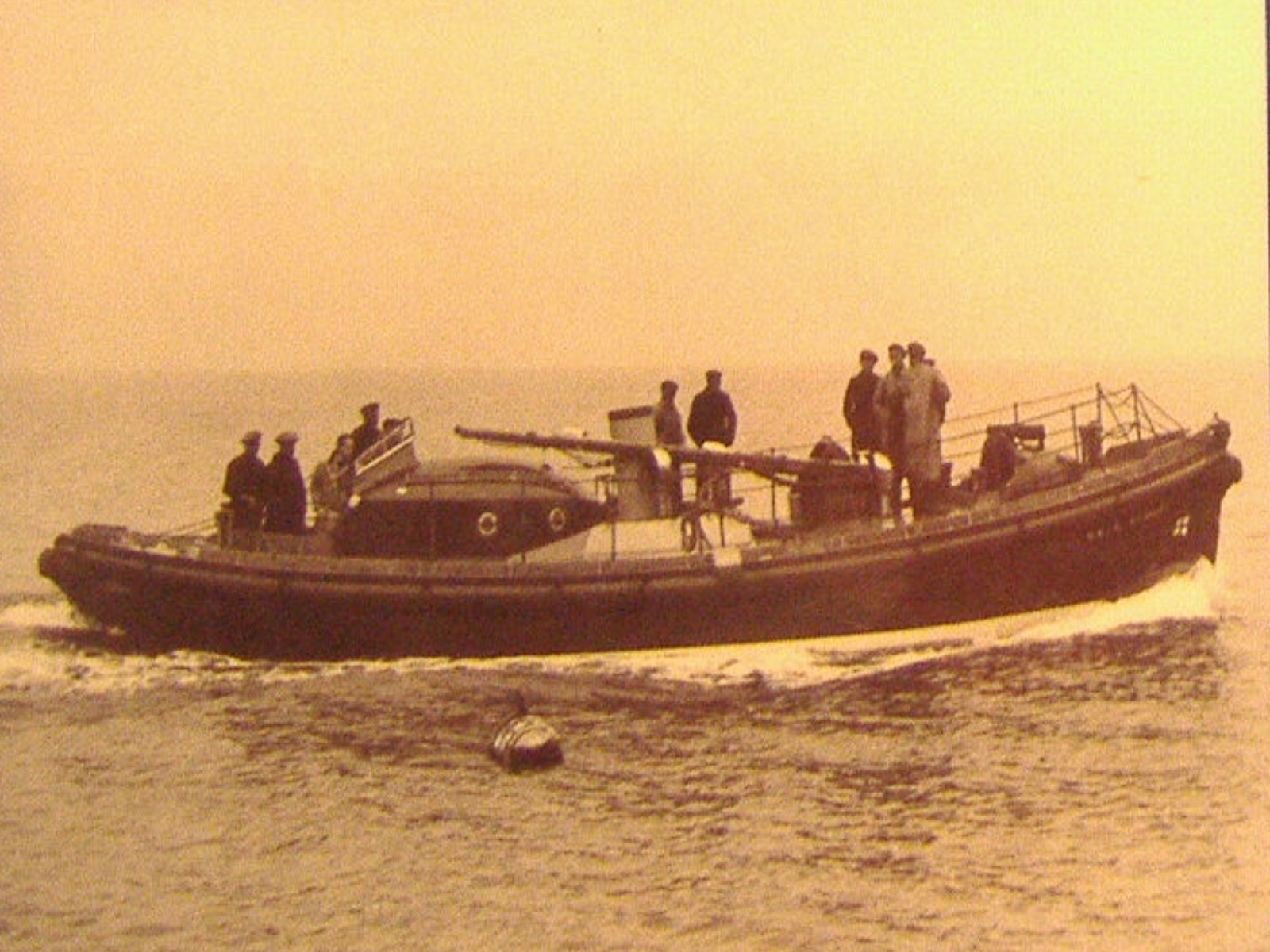
Cromer Lifeboat H F Bailey

Overnight the wind reached gale force by 0500 hrs. By daybreak Irishman and Yorkshireman had lost their lines. Scotsman had to be cut free for safety. By 0800 Monte Nevoso showed signs of starting to break up, so the remaining tugs were cast off. H F Bailey rescued 29 of Monte Nevoso's crew and Captain van der Hidde. Captain Solvatore, his chief officer, chief engineer and wireless operator refused to leave their ship, so H F Bailey left them aboard and took their 29 shipmates to Great Yarmouth.

H F Bailey's crew changed into dry clothes and at 1400 hrs left Great Yarmouth to return to Monte Nevoso. At 1645 hrs they reached the ship, where Solvatore and his last three officers still refused to leave. Solvatore told coxswain Blogg "My radio is all right. If I need assistance I will send for you", so H F Bailey returned to Great Yarmouth again. Blogg notified the Coastguard, and lodged his crew at the Mariners' Refuge for the night.

Overnight Monte Nevoso lost her wireless aerial and broke in two, and Solvatore and his three officers launched the ship's motor boat. As no distress signal had been received, H F Bailey returned to sea at 0500 hrs. At 0600 hrs the four survivors fired a distress flare. The crew of the trawler Gleam from Lowestoft sighted the flare and rescued the four. Unaware of the rescue, H F Bailey continued to the wreck.

== Rescue of pets ==
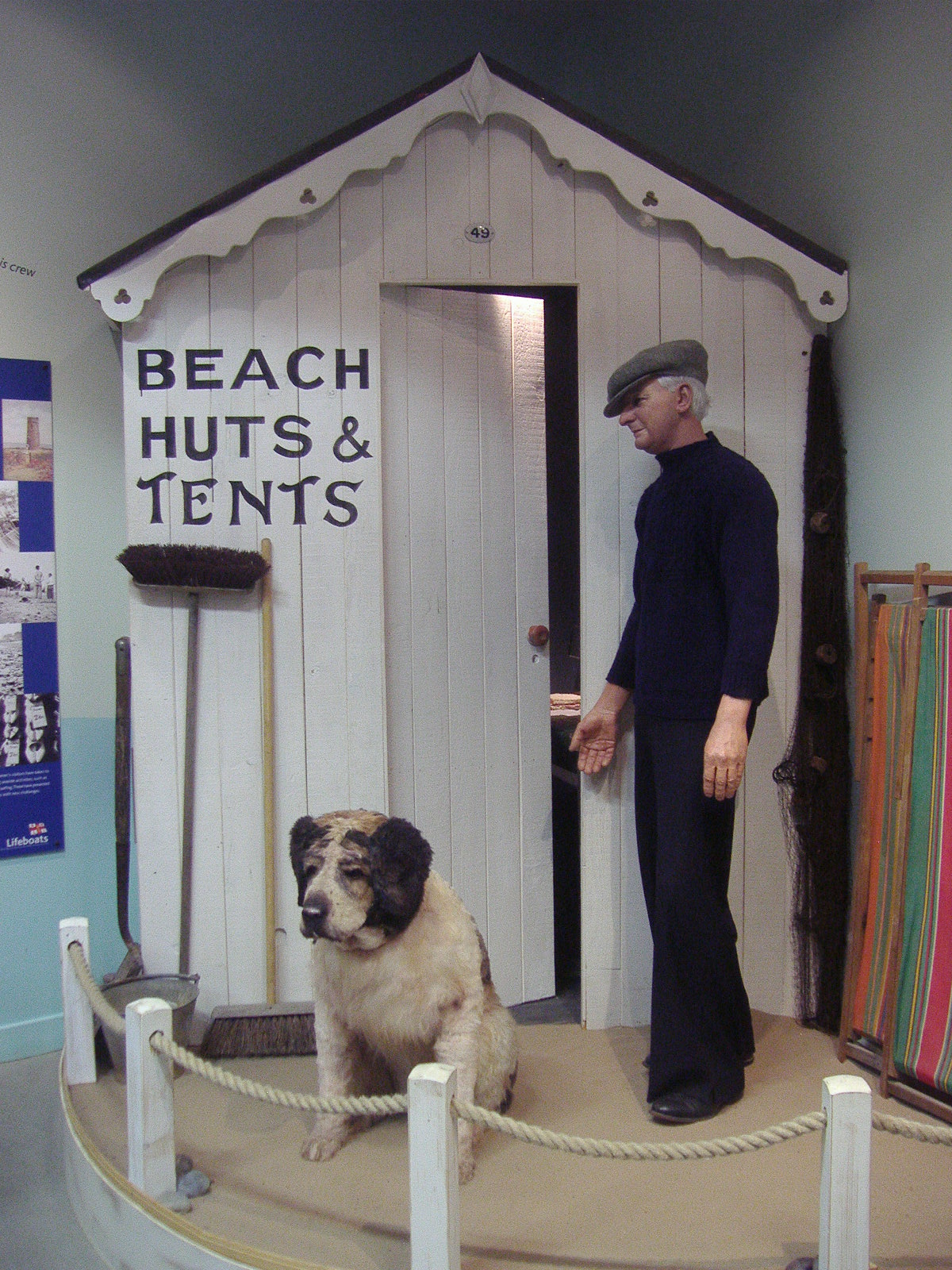
"Monte" from Monte Nevoso and a waxwork of Henry Blogg in Cromer Lifeboat Museum

H F Bailey reached Monte Nevoso at 0800 hrs. Unaware that Solvatore and his men had abandoned ship, Blogg and some of his crew searched the wreck. They heard whimpering in one of the cabins, so Blogg forced the door. Inside were two dogs: a small terrier which fled into the wreckage of the ship and was never found, and a Saint Bernard. In another cabin the lifeboat crew found several caged birds. They rescued the birds and the St Bernard and took them to Cromer, where they landed 1300 hrs. H F Bailey's mission had lasted 52 hours and she had covered 70 nautical miles (130 km).

The lifeboat crew handed the St Bernard to the local police, who put him in quarantine for six months. In gratitude Solvatore gave him to Blogg, who had never had a dog before. Blogg renamed him "Monte" after the ship, and became deeply attached to him. After Monte died in 1935 he was stuffed. He is now in the Henry Blogg Lifeboat Museum in Cromer.

== Awards ==
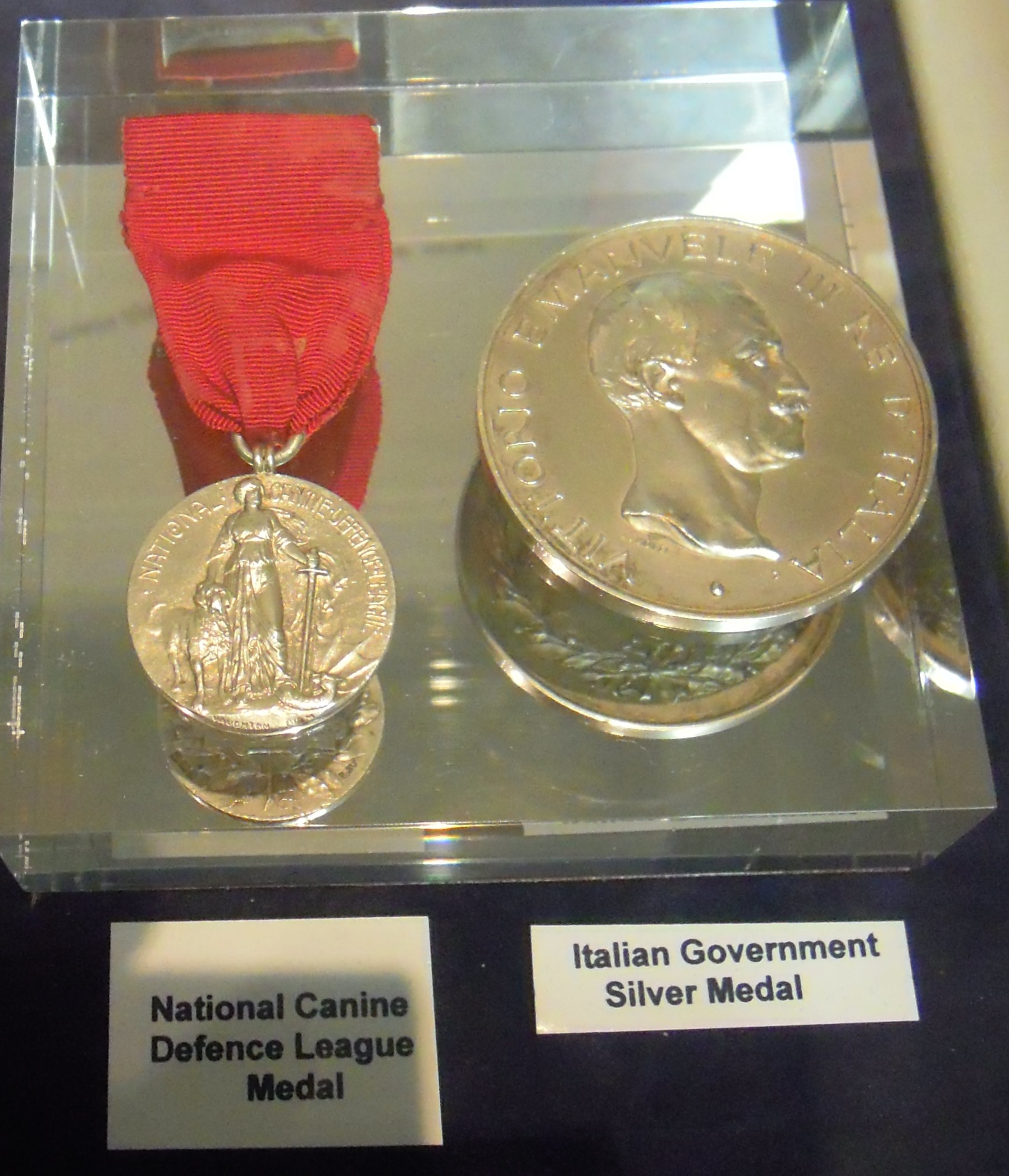
Henry Blogg's Canine Defence League silver medal and Italian silver medal in Cromer Lifeboat Museum

For his part in rescuing the crew of Monte Nevoso, the RNLI awarded Blogg its Silver Medal. For rescuing Monte the Canine Defence League and the Italian Government each awarded Blogg a silver medal. The Italian Government awarded each of H F Bailey's crew a bronze medal, and the RNLI awarded each of them the Thanks of the Institution written on vellum.

== Cromer Lifeboat crew ==
Crew of H F Bailey for the rescue of the Monte Nevoso
Name	Rank
Henry Blogg	Coxswain
W T Davis	
J Davis Jnr.	
G Cox	
A Balls	
G Balls	
R Davis	Mechanic
William H "Pimpo" Davies	
Robert "skinback" Cox	crew
J Davis Snr.	
J W Davis	
R Blogg	
W Allen	

== Wreck of Meriones ==
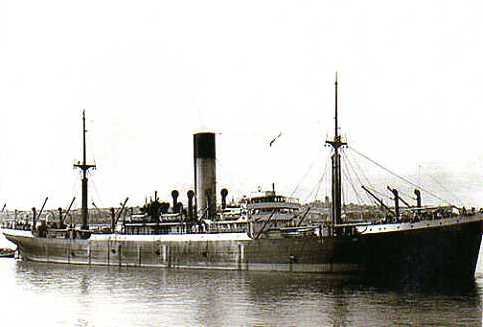
The refrigerated cargo ship Meriones, which was wrecked on Monte Nevoso's wreck in 1941

On 25 January 1941 the Blue Funnel Line cargo ship Meriones ran aground on the wreck of Monte Nevoso and became a total loss. Coxswain Blogg and the crew of H F Bailey rescued her crew. The two wrecks now lie next to each other on South Haisborough Bank at a depth of 19 m (62 ft) at position 52°51′N 01°45′E. The two wrecks are 10.3 nautical miles (19.1 km) north by northeast of Hemsby, 12.0 nautical miles (22.3 km) north of Caister-on-Sea and 13.0 nautical miles (24.1 km) north of Great Yarmouth.

== Bibliography ==
- Bensley, Mick (2001). The Rescues of Henry Blogg and the crews of the Cromer Lifeboat. Benginn. ISBN 1-85770-229-8.
- Jolly, C (2002). Henry Blogg, the Greatest of the Lifeboatmen. North Walsham: Poppyland Publishing. ISBN 0-946148-59-7.
- Malster, Bob; Stibbons, Peter (1986). The Cromer Lifeboats, 1804–1986. North Walsham: Poppyland Publishing. ISBN 0-946148-21-X.
- Tikus, Ayer (2003). The Ship-Wrecks off North East Norfolk. Ayer Tikus Publications. ASIN B0032Z2NU0.
- Harwich and Rotterdam to Cromer & Terschelling Admiralty Small Craft Chart (Map). 1:300,000. small craft charts. United Kingdom Hydrographic Office.
