= RNLB Ruby and Arthur Reed =

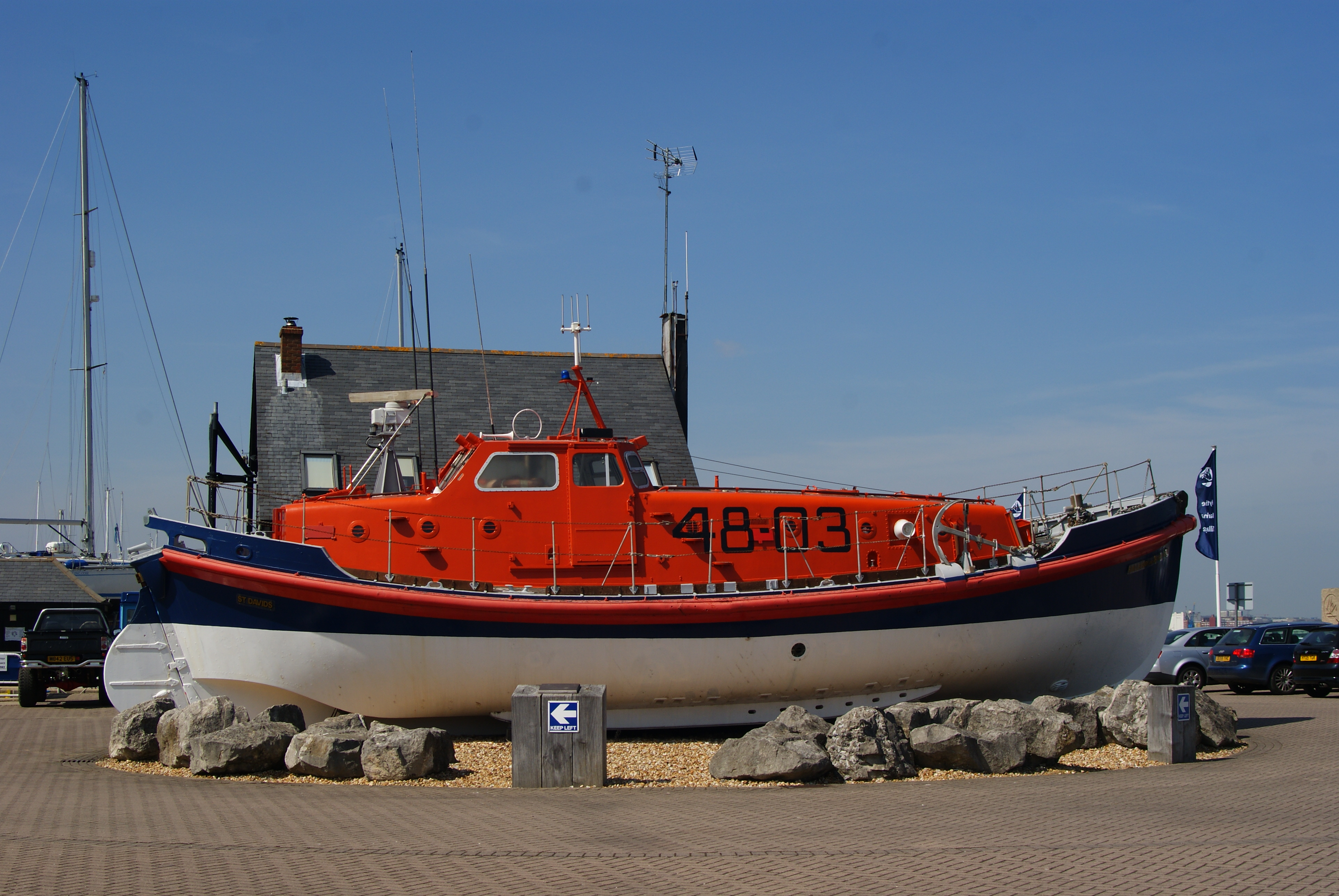

History

British RNLI Flag
- Owner: Royal National Lifeboat Institution (RNLI)
- Builder: William Osborne, Arun Shipyard, Littlehampton, West Sussex
- Official Number: ON 990
- Donor: Gift of Mrs R. M. Reed, Eastbourne, in memory of her Husband of Stanford
- Station: Cromer
- Cost: £60,000
- Launched: 1966
- Christened: 21 June 1967 by Mrs R M Reed
- Fate: A static display in the middle of a roundabout at Hythe Marina Village opposite Southampton Docks.

General characteristics
- Type: Oakley
- Displacement: 30 tonnes
- Length: 48 ft 6 in (14.78 m) overall
- Beam: 14 ft 0 in (4.27 m)
- Draught: 1.35m
- Installed power: Twin Gardner 6LX Diesel engine of 110 bhp (82 kW)
- Propulsion: 2× fixed pitch 5 blade propellers
- Speed: 9 knots (17 km/h)

Ruby and Arthur Reed (RNLI Official Number 990) was an Oakley-class lifeboat of the Royal National Lifeboat Institution (RNLI) stationed at Cromer in the English county of Norfolk from 30 April 1967 and was the No 1 lifeboat between various relief's until she was replaced after 17 years service by the Tyne-class Ruby and Arthur Reed II on 16 December 1985. During the time that the Ruby and Arthur Reed was on station at Cromer she performed 125 service launches, rescuing 58 lives.

== Design and construction ==
Ruby and Arthur Reed was built in 1966 at the yard of William Osborne at Littlehampton, West Sussex. She was an Oakley class self-righting design which combined great stability with the ability to self-right in the event of the lifeboat capsizing. This was achieved by a system of shifting water ballast. The system worked by the lifeboat taking on one and half tons of sea water at launching in to a tank built into the base of the hull. If the lifeboat then reached a crucial point of capsize the ballast water would transfer through valves to a righting tank built into the port side. If the capsize was to the starboard side of the lifeboat, the water shift started when an angle of 165° was reached. This would push the boat into completing a full 360° roll. If the capsize was to the port side, the water transfer started at 110°. In this case the weight of water combined with the weight of machinery aboard the lifeboat usually managed to stop the roll and allow the lifeboat to bounce back to upright.

=== Hull construction ===
The hull of the Ruby and Arthur Reed was constructed from African mahogany built with two skins. Each skin was diagonally laid with a layer of calico laid between the skins. The outer skin was 3/8 in (9.5 mm) thick with the inner skin being 1/4 in (6.4 mm) thick. The keel was iron and weighed 1.154 long tons (1.173 t). The hull was divided into eleven watertight compartments. The lifeboat was 48 feet 6 inches (14.78 m) in length and 14 feet 0 inches (4.27 m) in beam and displaced 12 long tons 1 cwt (27,000 lb or 12.2 t), when fully laden with crew and gear. She was fitted with twin 110 hp Gardner 6LX six cylinder diesel engines, which moved her over the water at 9 Knots. Ruby and Arthur Reed's aluminium wheelhouse was positioned amidships and was fully enclosed which provided welcome crew protection from the elements. Aft of the lifeboat there was another cabin which served as the chartroom and also housed all the lifeboats electronic equipment.

=== Equipment ===
The lifeboat was fitted with Decca 060 radar and all she carried Pye Westminster VHF and an Ajax MF Radiotelephone. In addition a radio Direction Finding set was carried, which gave a magnetic bearing to a transmitting station. The electric searchlight was standard along with Pains Wessex speedlines.

== Service ==
Ruby and Arthur Reed was on station at Cromer for seventeen years and during that time she was launched 125 times and she saved fifty eight lives. Her first service took place on 4 July 1967 to a motor fishing vessel called Renovate. The fishing boat's engine had failed and she was at anchor two miles east of Haisborough Sands. Two engineers from the Royal Naval minesweeper HMS Belton were put aboard to try to repair her. Coxswain Henry "Shrimp" Davies and his lifeboat stood by through the night until the boat's engines were once again working.

== Gallery ==
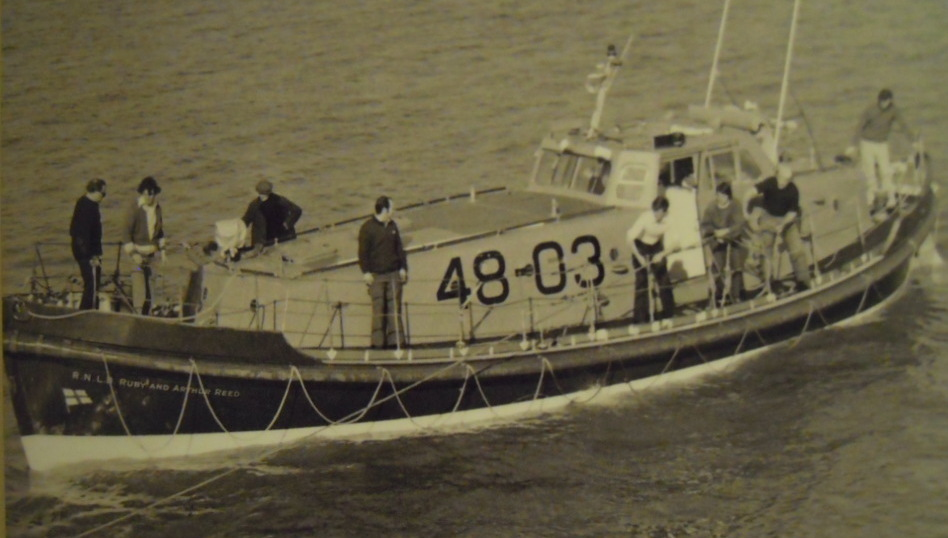
RNLB Ruby and Arthur Reed (ON 990). A photograph of the lifeboat taken during a launch from Cromer Station

== Service and rescues ==
Date	Casualty	Lives saved
1967
4 July	Motor fishing vessel Renovate, stood by	
20 January	Motor vessel Alme of Meppel, took out doctor	
3 September	Haisborough Lightvessel, landed a sick man	
10 October	Crab boat Lewis James of Cromer, gave help	
19 December	Trawler Rotha of Lowestoft. Landed a sick man	1
1968
4 February	Dinghy, saved dinghy	3
2 March	Motor launch Pinnace, of Poole saved launch	2
31 March	Steamship Alice Bowater of London, landed a sick man	1
11 May	Fishing boat Provider of Cromer, saved boat	2
13 May	Tug Workman of Hull stood by tug with warhead on board	
30 June	Cabin cruiser She's a Lady. Assisted to save cruiser	3
11 July	Motor vessel Ramso of Copenhagen, escorted	
23 August	Trawler Filby Queen of Lowestoft, landed a sick man	
30 August	Yacht Stilalisanin landed 1 and saved yacht	
18 September	Trawler Rock Fish of Lowestoft, took out doctor	
15 November	Gas Rig Hewitt Alpha, gave help	
1969
3 January	Motor vessel Friederike of Brake, landed a sick man	
14 January	Trawler Suffolk Kinsman of Lowestoft. Landed a sick man	
22 January	Motor fishing boat Thistle, saved boat	3
10 May	Motor fishing vessel Kindly Light, gave help	
21 May	Pipe laying vessel WD Tideway, landed a sick man	
1970
26 June	Motor fishing vessel Normanby of Bridlington, gave help	
12 November	Fishing boat My Beauty of Cromer, give escort	
1971
15 May	Cabin cruiser Nadine Leah, gave help	
13 June	Yacht Gentle Nimbus, gave help	
1972
5 May	Two fishing boats, stood by	
20 May	Trawler Boston Viscount of Lowestoft, landed injured man	
21 August	Fishing boat Cossack, saved boat	4
12 September	Cabin cruiser New Prince of Wales, saved cruiser	3
25 October	Fishing boat Provider of Cromer. Saved boat	4
1973
22 March	Motor vessel Silver Sands, landing a sick man	1
1973 to August 1974 of station for refit
1974
31 August	Lightvessel LV.22, landed sick man	
10 September	Motor vessel Langstone Tern, escorted boat	
1 November	Motor vessel Dutch Sailor, landed an injured man	
1975
21 February	Cargo vessel Fortuna II, landed an injured man	
22 May	Royal Naval ship HMS Shevington, sick man gave help	
8 September	Yacht Irishman, saved boat	10
26 October	Cruiser Andruss, saved boat	2
12 December	Freighter Alexandria, stood by vessel	
14 December	Freighter Alexandria, stood by vessel	
1976
6 February	Trawler Suffolk Conquest, took out Doctor to injured man	
23 June	Cargo vessel Garden Saturn, stood by vessel	
7 August	Fishing vessel Albert, saved vessel	2
18 August	Haisborough Lightvessel, landed an injured man	
15 September	Yacht Mr Micawber, saved boat	2
18 October	Fishing boat Sea Green, gave help	
1977
19 February	Cargo vessel Atlantic Duke, stood by vessel	
22 February	Catamaran Katabatic, gave help	
24 February	Chemical carrier Thorodland of Panama, stood by vessel	
18 March	Cargo vessel Femmy Lian, of Cyprus, gave help	
18 April	Cargo vessel Star River of France, gave help	
27 July	Cargo vessel Heye-P of Germany, injured man gave help	
9 September	Yacht Autumn Liz, gave help	
14 November	Cargo vessel Nimrod, of Jersey,	1
24 December	Cargo vessel Rafaela of Panama, stood by vessel	
1978
16 August	Fishing boat, gave help	
4 September	Fishing boat Charles Perkins, gave help	
1978 to May 1979 of station for refit
1979
22 May	Fishing boat Concorde II, missing crewman, landed body	
6 June	Yacht Victoria George gave help	
6 June	Tug Englishman, stood by vessel	
20 June	Oil rig standby vessel Boston Hornet, took out Doctor, landed a sick man	
1980
5 January	Fishing vessel Ellen, of Great Yarmouth, gave help	
17 January	Cargo vessel Lendoudis Evangelos of Greece, gave help	
8 April	Fishing boat, escorted home	
3 May	Motor fishing vessel Bess of Denmark, saved boat	4
23 June	Motor vessel Jenny Glen of Kings Lynn, saved boat	2
1981
30 January	Cargo vessel Ems of West Germany after collision, recovered life raft	
30 January	Cargo vessel Undine of Belgium after collision, recovered life raft	
2 June	Fishing boat Provider of Great Yarmouth, gave help	
2 August	Cabin cruiser Lancer, gave help	
2 August	Cabin cruiser Falcon, gave help	
13 August	Helicopter, gave help	
30 November	Oil rig supply vessel The Cuttlefish	2
1982
17 September	Skin Diver, gave help	
21 September	Fishing boat Provider of Cromer, escorted	
21 September	Fishing boat Elizabeth Kathleen of Wells-next-the-Sea, escorted	
12 December	Motor boat Trade Winds, saved boat	2
1983
12 July	Fishing boat Ventura of West Runton, landed injured man	
1984
15 February	Cargo vessel Camilla Weston, of London, landed 5	
9 May	Cargo vessel Marie Anne of Germany, landed sick man	
12 July	Aircraft, recovered the wreckage	
13 July	Fishing boat G.N.D., of Great Yarmouth, saved boat	2
15 August	Cargo vessel Emily P.G., of Shorham landed injured man	
4 September	Fishing boat Provider of Great Yarmouth, escorted	
September 1984	Retired from Cromer	
