= RNLB H F Bailey (ON 714) =

RNLB H F Bailey II (ON 714)
History

British RNLI Flag
- Owner: Royal National Lifeboat Institution (RNLI)
- Builder: J S White of Cowes, Isle of Wight
- Official Number: ON 714
- Donor: Legacy of Henry Francis Bailey, Brockenhurst, Surrey.
- Station: Cromer, Selsey
- Cost: £8,253
- Laid down: 1928
- Launched: 1929
- Acquired: 1929
- In service: 1929 -1937
- Fate: Destroyed in a boatyard fire June 1937

General characteristics
- Class & type: Watson-class
- Type: Motor lifeboat
- Length: 45 ft 6 in (13.87 m) overall
- Beam: 12 ft 6 in (3.81 m)
- Installed power: two 40hp Wayburn CE4 petrol engines
- Speed: 8.23 kn (15.24 km/h)
- Notes: Re-named RNLB Canadian Pacific (ON 714) when transferred to Selsey in 1929

RNLB H F Bailey II (ON 714) was the third lifeboat stationed at Cromer to bear this name, but the first of the four to bear a number in its name. This lifeboat was sent to replace H F Bailey (ON 694). Coxswain Henry Blogg of the Cromer - often referred to as "the greatest of the lifeboatmen" - was said to have disliked this lifeboat having preferred the previous lifeboat H F Bailey ON 695.

== Service record ==
Arriving at Cromer in May 1929, this lifeboat served at Cromer for only two years and over that period she was launched three times and saved the lives of five people. In 1929 she was transferred to Selsey Lifeboat Station and was renamed Canadian Pacific.
