= RNLB Harriot Dixon =

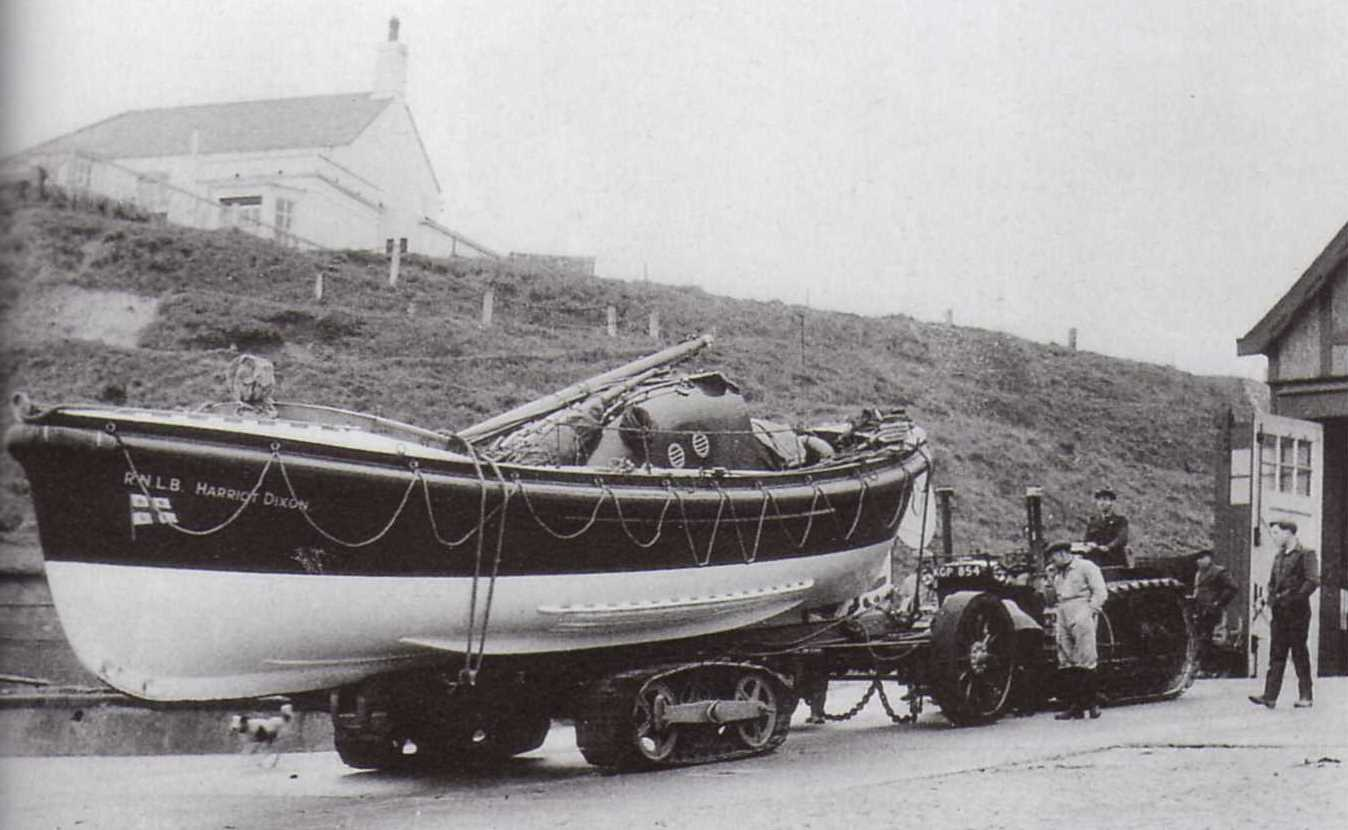
- RNLB Harriot Dixon (ON 770)

History

British RNLI Flag
- Owner: Royal National Lifeboat Institution (RNLI)
- Builder: Groves and Guttridge Ltd, Isle of Wight.
- Official Number: ON 770
- Donor: £3,750 Legacy of Mr William Edward Dixon, Worthing, West Sussex.
- Station: Cromer No2 Station
- Launched: 1934
- Christened: 27 August 1937, By the Rt Hon Sir Samuel Hoare
- Fate: Sold out of service in 1964 converted to cabin cruiser

General characteristics
- Class & type: Liverpool-class
- Length: 35 ft 6 in (10.82 m) overall
- Beam: 10 ft 3 in (3.12 m)
- Draught: 4 ft 5 in (1.35 m)
- Installed power: Single Weyburn AE6 Diesel engine of 35 bhp (26 kW)

RNLB Harriot Dixon (ON 770) is a retired Liverpool-class lifeboat of the Royal National Lifeboat Institution, that was stationed at Cromer in Norfolk in eastern England. Launched in 1934, she served for thirty years as the No 2 lifeboat at Cromer. She was launched 55 times and was responsible for saving the lives of 20 people. Dixon road, in the southern part of Cromer, is named after the lifeboat.

== History ==
The Liverpool-class motor lifeboat Harriot Dixon was built by Groves and Guttridge Ltd, on the Isle of Wight. She took up station at the beach lifeboat house on 2 August 1934 and remained at station as the No 2 lifeboat for thirty years until 15 June 1964. This lifeboat had been funded from a legacy of £3,750 left by William Edward Dixon, a surgeon, of West Worthing of the then county of Sussex (Now West Sussex). Mr Dixon had died in 1921 and had left the money to fund a lifeboat to be named after his mother and if possible to be stationed on the Kentish or east coast. Harriot Dixon went on to be the longest serving motor lifeboat at Cromer.

== Rescues and service ==
Date	Casualty	Lives Saved
1939
20 March	Motor vessel FOSNA of Bergen, landed a sick man	
9 October	RNLB H F BAILEY of Cromer, gave help landing 29 saved from SS Mount Ida	
12–13 October	Steamship LINWOOD of Middlesbrough, saved	12
12 December	Steamship CORBROOK of London, stood by	
1940
13 February	Tanker BRITISH TRIUMPH of London, saved two boats	
18 November	H M Trawler DUNGENESS, gave help	
20 November	H M Trawler DUNGENESS, gave help	
10 December	Steamship ROYSTON of Newcastle upon Tyne, gave help	
1941
11 March	Steamship KENTON of Newcastle, salvaged gear	
1 April	H M Trawler VALEXA, landed 1	
14 April	H M Trawler MADDEN and TAMORA, took out doctor landed 4 injured men	
6 August	Steamship TAARA of Pärnu, saved	8
9 September to 4 November	Steamship TEDDINGTON of London, gave help on 6 occasions	
1942
4 November	H M Trawler, Brought papers ashore	
3 December	Fishing boat MORNING STAR of Cromer, escorted boat	
1947
26 October	Motor vessel GOLD GNOME of London, stood by and gave help	
1948
1 April	Speed boat DAY II, landed 2 from steamship DYNAMO	
11–12 September	Motor Trawler GEORGE LANGWAY of Fecamp, gave help	
1949
26 January	Motor vessel FARNDALE of Middlesbrough, gave help	
1950
6 February	Tree fishing boats of Cromer and one from Runton, escorted boats	
17 June	Motor vessel GLAMIS of Dundee, landed a sick man	
1953
31 May	Fisheries Protection vessel HMS CHEERFUL, landed passengers	
5 June	Fishing boats MISS CROMER and WHY WORRY of Cromer, escorted boats	
15 September	Fishing boat WHY WORRY of Cromer, escorted boat	
1955
28 September	Steamship MOORWOOD of London, took out doctor	
17 December	Three fishing boats of Cromer, escorted boats	
1957
22 July	Yacht POCOCITA, stood by	
1960
16 April	Fishing boat JUNE ROSE of Sheringham, escorted boat	
1961
13 January	Motor vessel JURA of Groningen, gave help	
15 August	Crab Fishing boats FRIENDSHIP, BLACK BEAUTY, WILLIAM ROBERT & ENGLISH ROSE of Cromer, escorted boats	
1963
15 April	Steamship HUDSON SOUND of London, landed a sick man	
