= RNLB Alfred Corry =

Type of sailing and rowing lifeboat

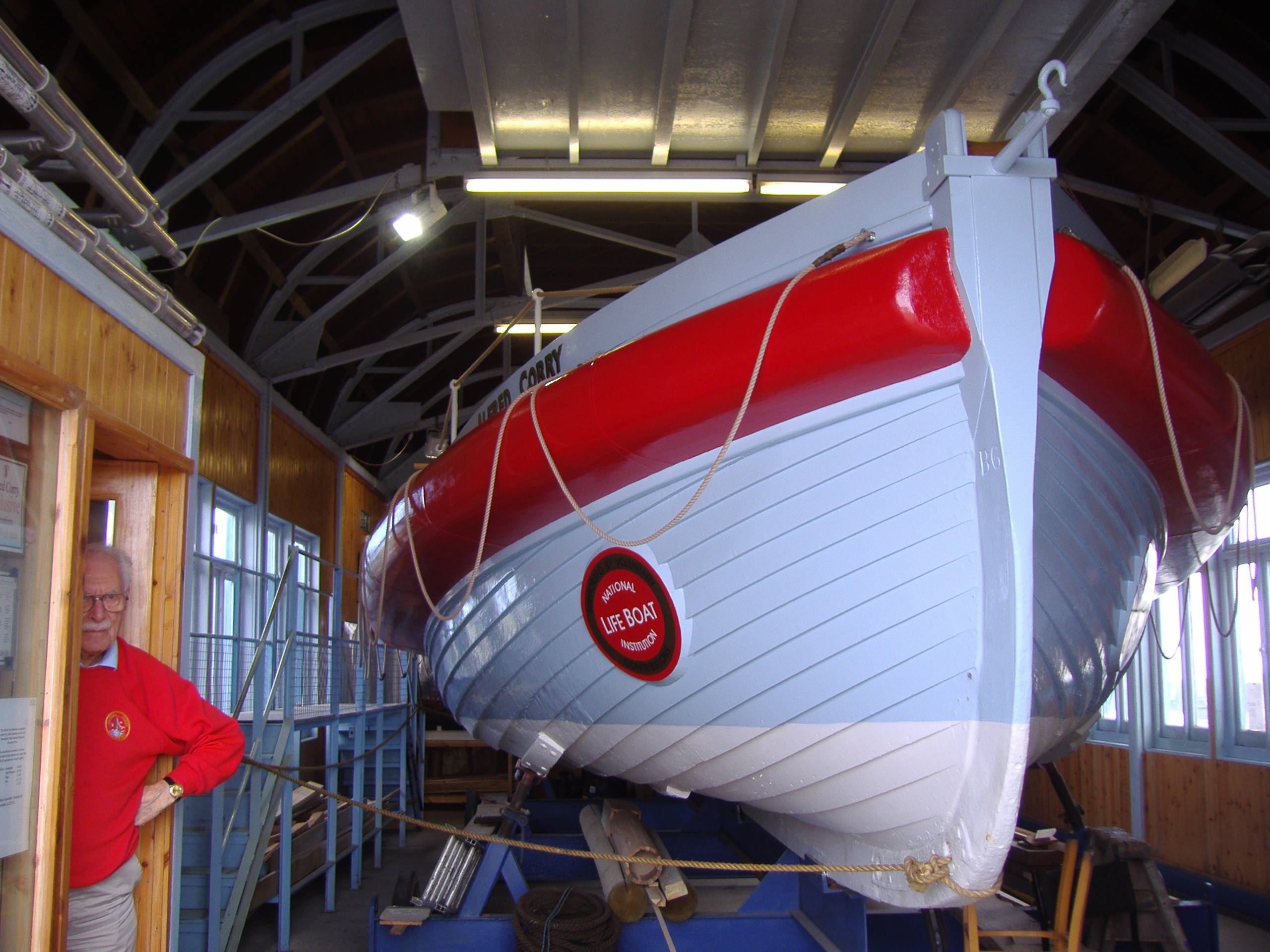
- Alfred Corry

History

United Kingdom
- Owner: Alfred Corry Lifeboat Museum
- Builder: Beeching Brothers of Great Yarmouth
- Official RNLI Number: ON 353
- Station: Southwold
- Cost: £490.7s.4d.
- Laid down: 1893
- Launched: 1894
- Sponsored by: From the estate of Mr Alfred J Corry
- Decommissioned: 1918
- In service: 25
- Fate: Converted to a Gentleman's Yacht until restoration began in 1976

General characteristics
- Class & type: Norfolk and Suffolk-Type
- Type: Non-self-righting, sailing and rowing lifeboat
- Displacement: 8 tons
- Length: 44 ft 1 in (13.44 m) overall
- Beam: 13 ft 0 in (3.96 m)
- Draught: 2 ft 3.5 in (0.699 m)
- Depth: 4 ft 10 in (1.47 m)
- Installed power: Sail and Oars
- Crew: 18 men

RNLB Alfred Corry (ON 353) is a Norfolk and Suffolk-class, non-self-righting, sailing and rowing lifeboat which served in the town of Southwold in the county of Suffolk. The boat was funded and crewed by the Royal National Lifeboat Institution (RNLI). She is kept on display in a museum in Southwold.

== History ==
The Alfred Corry was constructed in 1893 by Beeching Brothers of Great Yarmouth for the RNLI at a cost of £490.7s.4d.

The Alfred Corry was the first example of an improved class of Norfolk and Suffolk lifeboat called the Carvel-class. The boat's construction was funded by a donation left to the Royal National Lifeboat Institution (RNLI) from the estate of Alfred James Corry of Putney, for whom she was named. During her 25-year working career, she was launched 41 times. She and her crew are credited with saving 47 lives.

In 1919 the Alfred Corry was sold to Lord Albemarle and converted to a yacht, based out of Lowestoft. She was renamed Alba and an engine was added in 1921. In 1949 the boat was renamed Thorfinn. She was being used as a houseboat at Maldon by 1976, at which point she was bought and restored as a seaworthy yacht under her original name.

In 1994 the Alfred Corry was presented to the newly formed Alfred Corry Charitable Trust. Subsequently, the Trust acquired the former Cromer Lifeboat shed and transported this to Southwold. In 1998, the lifeboat was moved to these new quarters for an extensive restoration to her original state.

== Description ==
The lifeboat is 44.07 feet (13.43 m) in length and has a beam of 13.00 feet (3.96 m). Her depth was 4.82 feet (1.47 m). The lifeboat is equipped with two masts carrying lug sails. She originally had 16 oars, but this was later reduced to 14.

The lifeboat was launched from the beach until 1908 when a slipway was built in the harbour. The lifeboat would be boarded before the launch. The beach team would then haul the boat by hauling on a line that was fastened around a piling on the beach.

== Museum ==
The Alfred Corry is housed in a museum named after the boat on the northern side of Southwold Harbour at the mouth of the River Blyth. The current Southwold Lifeboat Station is adjacent to the museum. The museum was once the Cromer Lifeboat shed, built in 1923 and the first of its type to have been built by the RNLI. The old station was delivered to Southwold by sea in 1998 and was also fully restored. It is one of only a few remaining examples of its type lifeboat sheds built by the RNLI at that time. Alfred Corry forms the main exhibit in the museum which is free to enter.
