= RNLB Ruby and Arthur Reed II =

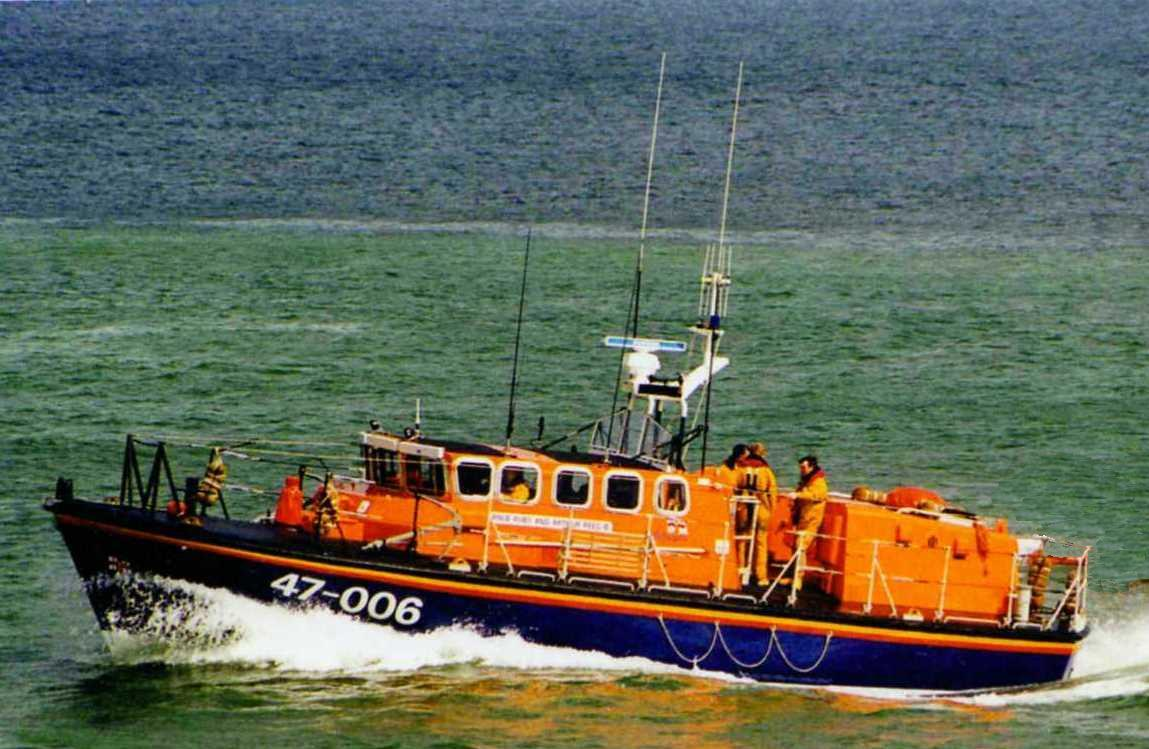
- Ruby and Arthur Reed II

History

British RNLI Flag
- Owner: Royal National Lifeboat Institution (RNLI)
- Builder: Fairey Marine, Cowes, Isle of Wight
- Official Number: ON 1097
- Station: Cromer
- Cost: £2.5 million
- Launched: 1985
- Sponsored by: £1.23m Bequest of Derek Clifton Lethern of Southfields, London
- Christened: Monday 8 September by the Duke of Kent.

General characteristics
- Type: Tyne class
- Tonnage: 31.5 tonnes
- Length: 52 ft 5 in (15.98 m) overall
- Beam: 18 ft 0 in (5.49 m)
- Draught: 1.35m
- Installed power: Twin turbo Diesel engine of 1,015 bhp (757 kW) each
- Propulsion: 2 X fixed pitch 5 blade propellers
- Speed: 25 knots (46 km/h)
- Range: 10 hours at 25 knots (46 km/h)
- Capacity: 4,600 litres/1,000 gallons
- Crew: 7 crew including a doctor

RNLB Ruby and Arthur Reed II (ON 1097) was a Tyne-class lifeboat stationed at Cromer in the English county of Norfolk from 16 December 1985 and was the No 1 lifeboat between various relief's until she was replaced after 21 years service by the Tamar-class RNLB Lester (ON 1287) in December 2007. Between 1996 and 1999, during the rebuilding of the pier head lifeboat house and slipway, she was temporarily replaced by a carriage launched Mersey-class lifeboat, RNLB Her Majesty The Queen (ON 1189). During the time that the Ruby and Arthur Reed was on station at Cromer she performed 120 service launches, rescuing 102 lives including 3 dogs. Nearly 50% of her launches took place during the hours of darkness and 17 of them saw her facing gale force 7 winds. Her service launches included helping 48 merchant and fishing vessels and 47 pleasure craft.

== Design and construction ==
Ruby and Arthur Reed II was designed as a fast slipway boat (FSB) and featured a semi-planing hull fabricated from steel. This hull had a shallow draught and a long straight keel with a flared bow above the waterline. To protect the propellers they were housed in tunnels with substantial bilge keels, and a straight wide keel ending at a hauling shoe enabling winching for the boat when it was returned up the slipway back into the boathouse. The wheelhouse had a low profile so as to fit into existing boathouses. Amidships there was a flying bridge with a separate cabin aft of the upper steering position.

=== Equipment ===
The lifeboats power came from twin General Motors GM6V92TA DDEC turbo-charged marine two-stroke diesel engines which could develop 525 brake horsepower (391 kW). These engines could push the lifeboat to a top speed of 18 knots (33 km/h). At full speed there was enough diesel fuel in the tanks for ten hours service. At lower speeds the endurance was significantly increased. The engines were computer-managed, with data being displayed on twin screens which was viewed at both the Mechanic's and the Helm position in the wheelhouse. Within the wheelhouse there were six seats for the crew plus a jumper seat for a doctor. Ruby and Arthur Reed's equipment included satellite navigation apparatus interfaced through a PC to a visual chart display. Daylight viewing radar was used both for navigation and to search for casualties. There was VHF radio direction-finding equipment for locating vessels in trouble. The lifeboat also carried the latest DSC digital radio equipment for the vital radio communication used in search and rescue missions. The lifeboat was equipped with three VHF radios one of which was portable, together with an MF `long range`set. On the deck were powerful searchlights, and the lifeboat was also later equipped with image-intensifying night sight equipment. Ruby and Arthur Reed carried a large amount of first-aid equipment including both oxygen and entonox.

== Notable rescues ==
=== Yacht Phaedra ===
During the early hours of 29 September 1988 a gale with winds in force eight to nine had occurred. Caught in this gale where the husband and wife crew of the yacht Phaedra out of Whitby. The skipper had no idea of his position and with the help from power from a car battery had used his VHF radio to call for help to the coastguard. The coastguard using the transmission to gain a bearing for the Phaedra placed her as thirty miles north east of Cromer. The coastguard called out the Ruby and Arthur Reed and within seven minutes of the call she was underway. In the meantime Rig stand-by vessels Desirade, Stout Truck and Vulcan Service were attending the yacht and stood by as she drifted in the relentless weather conditions. To save time reaching the yacht coxswain Richard Davies decided to take the Ruby and Arthur Reed across sandbanks. The coxswain reported that the lifeboat had handled well in the broken waters above the banks and 20 to 25-foot (7.6 m) waves had come aboard the lifeboats deck. At 2.30am the Ruby and Arthur Reed found the stricken yacht going round in circles with all sails set. At Davies request the sails were lowered and the yacht was taken into tow. The weather conditions made it impossible for the husband and wife to be taken off the yacht or for a lifeboatman to be put aboard. The decision was taken to tow the yacht in a southerly direction towards Bacton, a task that took the lifeboat seven hours. By 10am the lifeboat had towed the yacht to the lee of the land were conditions had improved. Now a crewman was put aboard the Phaedra and with increased speed the vessel was towed into Great Yarmouth by 12.30pm. The adverse conditions however, prevented the Ruby and Arthur Reed from returning to her station for several days.

==== Award ====
For this service the thanks of the Institution on Vellum was accorded to Coxswain Richard Davis.

== Service and rescues ==
Date	Casualty	Lives saved
1986
24 January	Tanker Orleans of Lowestoft, gave Help	
24 January	Rig standby vessel Boston Sea Stallion of Lowestoft, escorted	
29 August	Fishing vessel Nicholas of London, saved vessel	2
26 September	Yacht Blythe Andora, gave help	
1988
8 February	Tug Anna B, gave help	
15 June	Fishing vessel Sparkling Star, saved vessel	3
10 July	Yacht Kass-A-Nova, saved yacht	4
15 July	Coaster Luminance, gave help	
17 July	Lost diver, gave help	
23 July	Fishing vessel Two Sisters, saved vessel	1
4 August	Fishing vessel Ever Hopeful of Great Yarmouth, gave help	
29 August	Skin Divers, landed 5	
19 September	Fishing boat G.N.D. of Great Yarmouth, escorted boat	
29 September	Yacht Phaedra of Whitby, saved vessel	2
1 October	fishing vessel Courageous of Inverness, gave help	
1989
14 February	RoRo cargo vessel Tor Gothia of Sweden, gave help	
30 May	Fishing boat, escorted vessel	
30 June	Yacht Serena, saved yacht	2
30 June	Yacht Martlet, saved yacht	2
10 October	Fishing vessel De Vroun Melanie of Lowestoft, stood by vessel	
1990
6 May	Motor vessel, escorted boat	
20 June	Yacht Meander, gave help	
6 August	Standby safety vessel St Mark, saved 2 boats	
30 August	Floating drifter rig Rowville, gave help	
16 September	Fishing vessel Mar Tigre, stood by vessel	
21 November	Cargo vessel Stavroula, gave help	
1992
12 January	Motor boat Sara B, escorted boat	
19 February	Vessel Bressay Sound, landed a sick man	
10 June	Yacht Tassella, gave help	
20 July	Yacht Illyria, saved yacht	
29 July	Yacht Cherokee II, gave help	
21 August	Gas survey vessel Fortissimo, Landed 3 and saved vessel	
14 October	Fishing vessel Isobel Kathleen, saved vessel	4
24 October	Barge Rock, gave help	
5 December	Yacht Milford of Otley, saved yacht and 2 dogs	1
1993
13 October	Yacht Happy Bear, saved vessel	5
5 November	Cargo vessel Daniella, gave help	
7 December	Rig stand by vessel, stood by	
1994
28 July	Motor cruiser Heather Down, gave help	
30 July	Two skin divers, gave help	
22 September	Cargo vessel Nescio, took out doctor and landed injured man	
1995
12 March	Cargo vessel Nordstar, in collision, escorted vessel	
27 June	Salvage vessel Putford Puffin, took out doctor and landed a sick man	
5 July	Diving support ship Ocean Stephaniturm, stood by ship	
1996
1 April	Fishing vessel Juliet, 1 person and craft brought in	
23 April	Motor cruiser Blue Lancer, 2 person and craft brought in	
21 July	Two divers, gave help	
24 July	Yacht Giselle, saved craft	2
15 August	Motor cruiser Ocean Diver, saved craft	
1999
10 July	Six divers, six persons brought in after being saved by another lifeboat	
10 July	Dive support craft Desert Moon, 8 people and craft brought in	
10 September	Yacht Halcyon Oak, 2 people and craft brought in	
3 October	Yacht Lady Patience, gave help	
16 December	Powerboat Samphire of Wells, gave help	
22 December	Body in sea, gave help	
2000
11 March	Passenger ferry Norstar, stood by	
27 May	Yacht Coquette, escorted vessel	
16 June	Dive support craft Crusader, 4 people and dog landed, craft brought in	
10 July	Ex-trawler Excelsior, saved vessel	9
2001
14 January	Tug Golden Cross, 4 people and vessel brought in	
16 February	Rowing boat Maximum Exposure, 1 person and craft brought in	
25 February	Tanker Zanita, escorted boat	
17 May	Rowing boat Maximum Exposure, saved boat	1
5 June	Powerboat Whirlwind, 2 people and craft brought in	
2002
9 January	Fishing vessel Zuider Zee, gave help	
2003
7 May	Ketch Ngataki, 3 people and craft brought in	
24 May	Yacht Rambling Rose, gave help	
7 September	Sloop Just Joia, gave help	
2004
15 February	Fishing boat Lisa Diane, stood by	
3 March	Fishing vessel Serene Dawn, 2 people and craft brought in	
27 June	Yacht Suli Suli, person and craft brought in	
28 June	Yacht Suli Suli, craft brought in	
7 July	Yacht Marie-Louise, 2 people landed and saved craft	
19 July	Motor cruiser Orovida, gave help	
15 August	Motor cruiser Dooby Soo, gave help transferred casualty to helicopter	
27 August	Motor cruiser Fiddlers Green, escorted vessel	
2005
16 May	Motor cruiser Jester, 3 people landed and craft brought in	
28 May	Motor cruiser Scooby Doo 2, 2 people and craft brought in	
18 June	Dive support craft Wreckless, 4 people and craft brought in	
7 August	Yacht Arosa, 3 people landed and craft brought in	
23 October	Rig support vessel Iona, Landed an injured man	
2006
18 February	Turkish coaster Willow, gave help	
