= RNLB Queen Victoria =

History

British Civil Ensign
- Operator: Royal National Lifeboat Institution
- In service: 1887-1902
- Homeport: Bembridge, Isle of Wight, United Kingdom

General characteristics
- Class & type: Lifeboat
- Propulsion: Oars

RNLB Queen Victoria is an historic shore-based lifeboat, built in 1887, operated by the Royal National Lifeboat Institution (RNLI), and now preserved at The Shipwreck Centre, Arreton, Isle of Wight.

A rowing boat, Queen Victoria operated from Bembridge on the Isle of Wight from 1887 to 1902. It was then purchased by one of its crew, who converted it for use as a houseboat.

In 1989 Martin Woodward, then coxswain of the Bembridge lifeboat, purchased Queen Victoria and, after several years of fundraising, the boat was finally restored in 1998, at the Classic Boat Museum, in East Cowes.

The boat is now under the stewardship of the Isle of Wight Historic Lifeboat Trust, a registered charity, and is seaworthy.

1999 it was taken to the BBC Television Centre in London to appear on the BBC television programme Blue Peter, to mark the RNLI's 175th anniversary.
