= RNLB H F Bailey (ON 670) =

Lifeboat

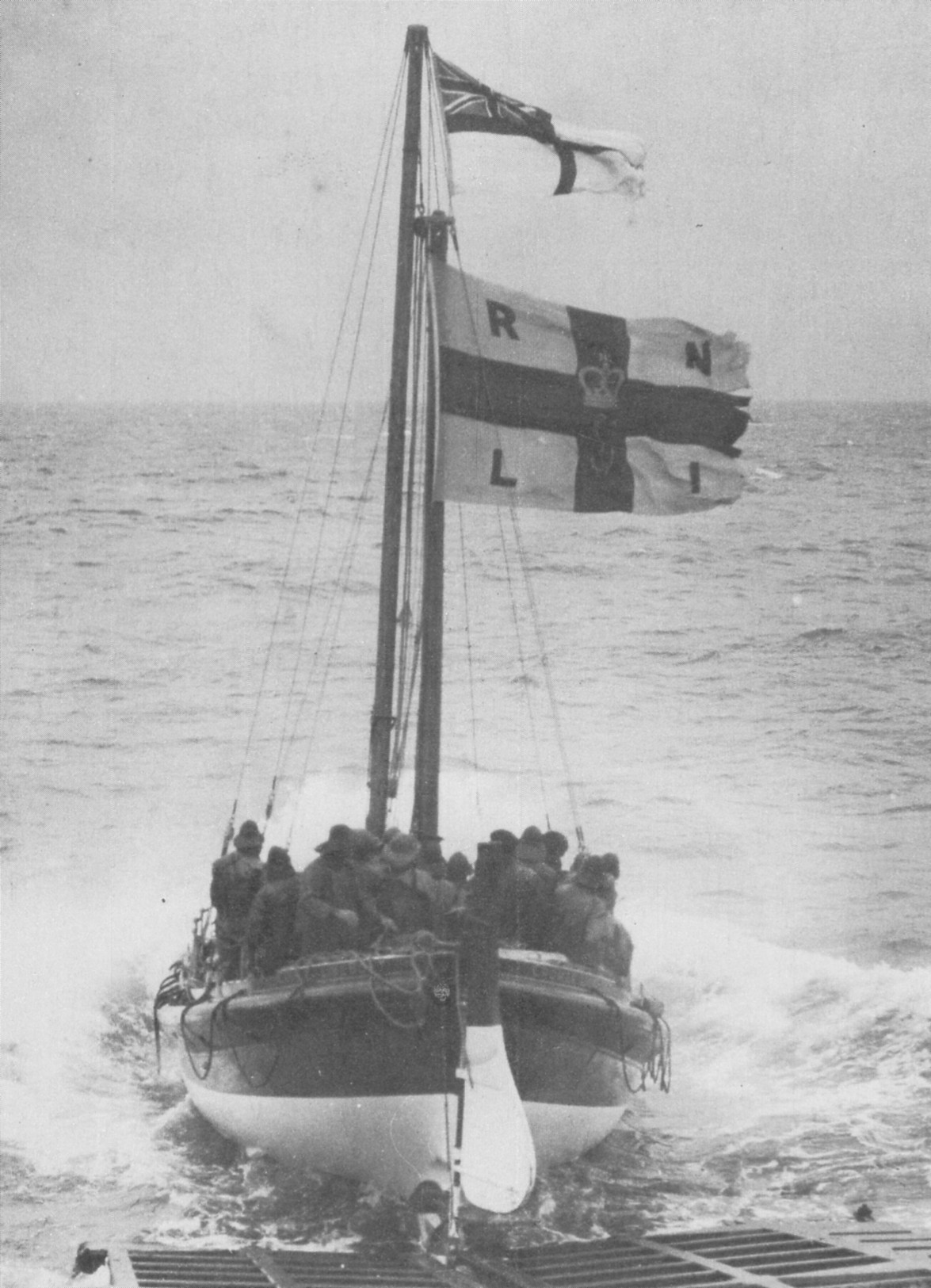
- H.F. Bailey ON670 launching circa 1923
- Owner: Royal National Lifeboat Institution (RNLI)
- Builder: J. Samuel White at Cowes, Isle of Wight.
- Laid down: 1923
- Official Number: ON 670
- Donor: Legacy of Henry Francis Bailey, Brockenhurst, Surrey.

Cromer lifeboat station
- Name: H F Bailey
- Namesake: Henry Francis Bailey
- In service: 1924
- Out of service: 1924
- Fate: Moved to Great Yarmouth & Gorleston

Gt Yarmouth and Gorleston
- Name: John and Mary Meiklam of Gladswood
- In service: 1924
- Out of service: 1939
- Fate: to relief fleet

Relief Fleet
- In service: 1930
- Out of service: 1952
- Fate: preserved in museum

General characteristics
- Type: Norfolk and Suffolk-class
- Length: 46 ft 6 in (14.17 m) overall
- Beam: 12 ft 9 in (3.89 m)
- Installed power: 80 bhp (60 kW)
- Propulsion: Single Weyburn Diesel engine

RNLB H F Bailey (ON 670) was the first Royal National Lifeboat Institution (RNLI) lifeboat powered by a motor, that served from Cromer Lifeboat Station.

After brief service at Cromer it was transferred to Gorleston lifeboat station and served there as the John and Mary Meiklam of Gladswood until 1939. ON 670 spent the rest of its service with the RNLI as one of the relief fleet covering many stations until 1952.

It was restored and was put on display from 1994 at Gorleston.

== Description ==
ON 670 was a was a Norfolk and Suffolk-class lifeboat built in 1923 by J. Samuel White at Cowes, Isle of Wight. She was 46 ft 6 in (14.17 m) long with a beam of 12 ft 9 in (3.89 m) powered by an 80 bhp (60 kW) Weyburn DE6 engine

== Donor ==
The Cromer station had four motor-powered lifeboats all called H F Bailey, after the donor, a Mr Henry Francis Bailey of Brockenhurst, a London merchant who was born in Norfolk and had died in 1916.

== New boathouse ==
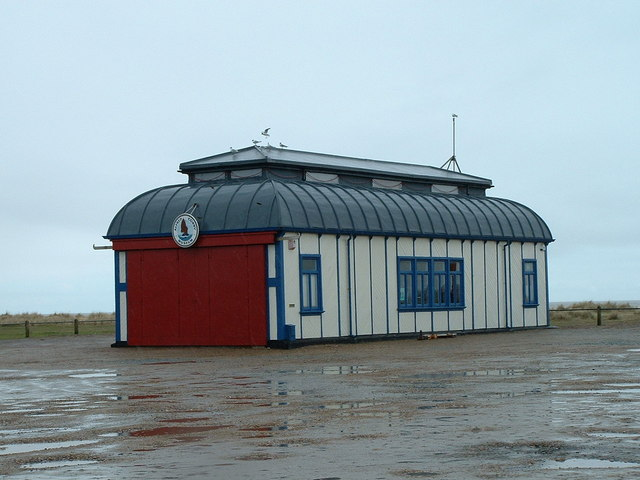
The 1923 Cromer Lifeboat house now located in Southwold in Suffolk

To accommodate this new motor lifeboat a new lifeboat house and slipway were built on the end of the Cromer Pier. The planning and building of this new boathouse was carried out three years before the arrival of H F Bailey and was ready on the day that the new lifeboat arrived in the town. The new house was 60 feet (18 m) long and 21 feet (6.4 m) wide with a solid concrete floor. The placing of this house at the end of the town's pier allowed the new lifeboat to be launched at all states and conditions of the tide. With the pier itself projected 500 feet (150 m) from the shore line and with the 60 feet (18 m) of the boathouse and a further 165 feet (50 m) of slipway when the lifeboat launched it was well clear of the rocks and groynes along Cromer's beach front. The new lifeboat house cost £32,000.

== Service and rescues ==
H F Bailey (ON 670) was the Cromer No. 1 boat on station for just one year. Due to problems with her launch and recovery on the slipway, she was transferred to Great Yarmouth & Gorleston station on 5 May 1924, where she served until 1939.

H F Bailey (ON 670), rescues at Cromer
Year	Date	Casualty	Lives saved
1923	19 July	Smack Hepatica of Lowestoft, assisted to save vessel	
1924	1 January	Steamship Nephrite of Glasgow, assisted to save vessel	12

In the relief fleet, ON670 spent time at Walton & Frinton, Lowestoft, Ramsgate, Great Yarmouth & Gorleston, Holyhead, Lytham St Anne, Pwllheli, Salcombe, Shoreham Harbour, Newhaven, Falmouth, Fowey, and Weymouth.

== See also ==
- Cromer Lifeboat H F Bailey ON 694
- Cromer Lifeboat H F Bailey III
