= RNLB Lester =

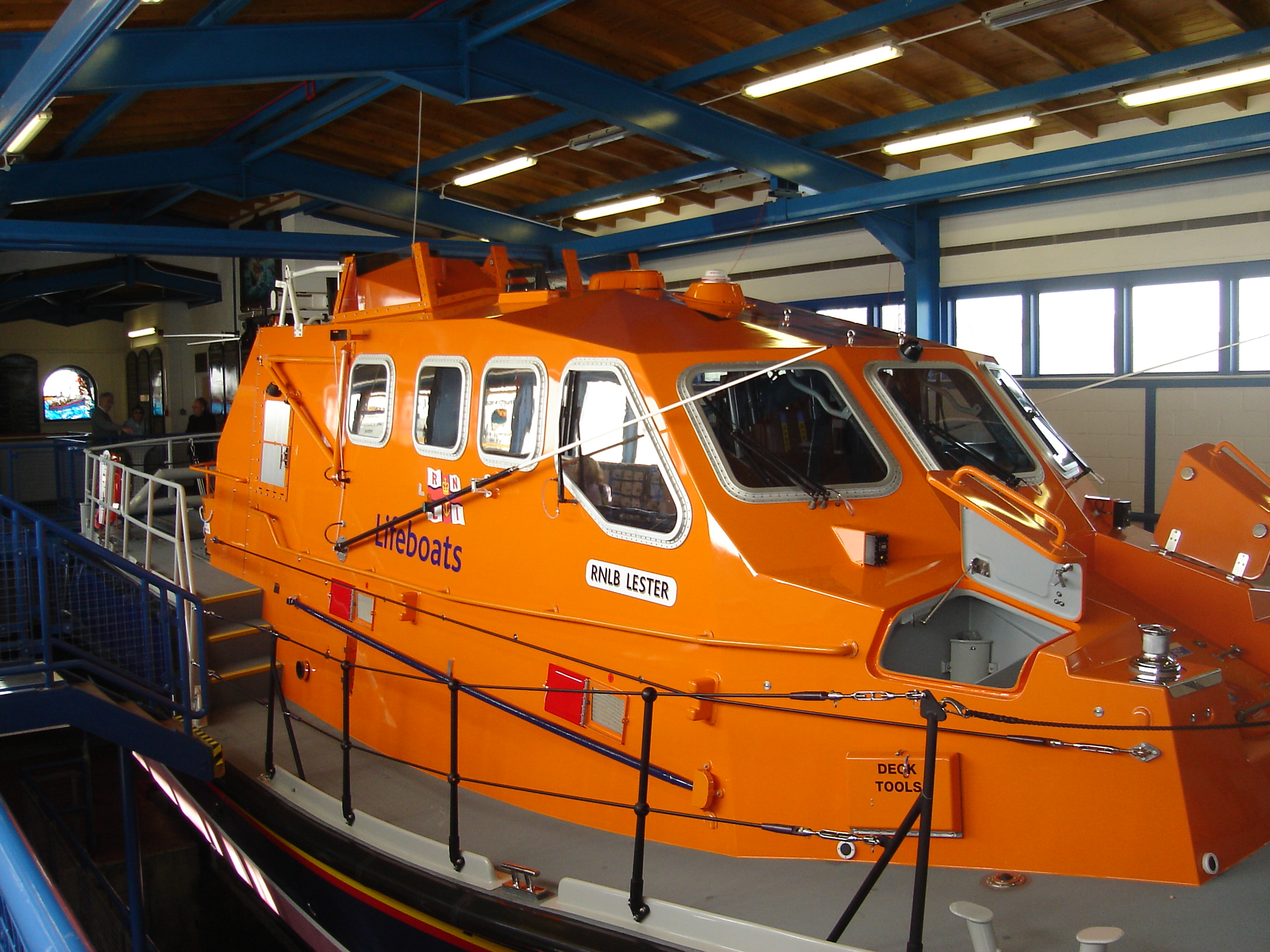
- RNLB Lester (ON 1287)

History

British RNLI Flag
- Owner: Royal National Lifeboat Institution (RNLI)
- Builder: Green marine/DML of Plymouth
- Identification: ON 1287 (Official Number)
- Station: Cromer
- Cost: £2.5 million
- Launched: 26 April 2007
- Sponsored by: £1.23m Bequest of Derek Clifton Lethern of Southfields, London
- Christened: Monday 8 September 2008 by The Duke of Kent.

General characteristics
- Type: Tamar class
- Tonnage: 31.5 gt
- Displacement: 31.5 t (31 long tons)
- Length: 16 m (52 ft) overall
- Beam: 5 m (16 ft)
- Draught: 1.35 m (4.4 ft)
- Installed power: Twin turbo Caterpillar C18 Diesel engine of 1,015 bhp (757 kW) each
- Propulsion: 2 X fixed pitch 5 blade propellers
- Speed: 25 knots (29 mph; 46 km/h)
- Range: 10 hours at 25 knots/250 nmi (460 km)
- Capacity: 4,600 litres/1,000 gallons
- Crew: 7 crew including a doctor
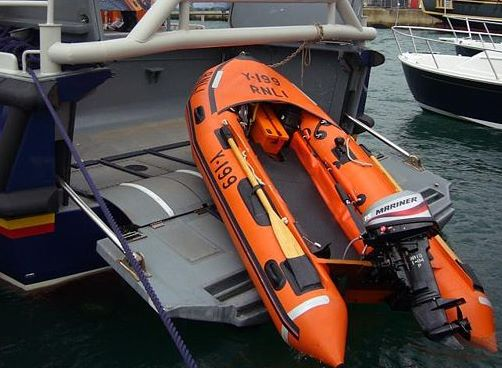
- Y Class Daughter Boat

General characteristics Y-207 Daughter Boat aboard Lester ON 1287
- Type: Y class
- Length: 3 m (9.8 ft)
- Propulsion: 1 × Mariner outboard engine, 15 hp (11 kW)
- Speed: 25 knots (29 mph; 46 km/h)
- Range: Within visual range of ALB
- Complement: 2
- Notes: Official Number Y-207

RNLB Lester (ON 1287) is the all-weather lifeboat (ALB) stationed at Cromer in the English county of Norfolk. Cromer was the first lifeboat station on the east English coast to receive the latest Tamar-class lifeboat. The lifeboat became officially operational at 3:55 pm on 6 January 2008. The lifeboat was officially christened Lester on Monday 8 September by the Duke of Kent. The lifeboats name Lester has been created by using parts of the surnames of Derek Clifton Lethern and William Foster, both of whom have been long-term supporters and members of the RNLI. Mr Lethern left £1.23m to the RNLI when he died in 1992 and asked for a new lifeboat to be bought in memory of him and his friend Mr Foster.

== Design and construction ==
Lester ON 1287 is a Tamar class slipway launched lifeboat, designed to replace the Tyne-class lifeboat. The Tamar class lifeboat is the most advanced vessel in the RNLI fleet. The Lester ON 1287 is loaded with new technology, including fly-by-wire joystick steering, suspension seats to protect crew in severe weather, and an onboard computer system called Systems and Information Management System (SIMS). SIMS allows complex tasks such as engine and navigation management to be displayed on a single flat LCD screen, six of which are positioned around the vessel, to allow crew to operate all the systems without moving from their seats. In the stern section of Lester ON 1287 there is a built in recessed chamber which house a small inflatable daughter boat. Access to the inflatable daughter boat is by means of lowering the transom, and lifting a section of deck. This allows the tender to be launched and recovered on to a ramp provided by the lowered transom section. On the Lester ON 1287 the Y class boat has the official number Y-207. The lifeboat's hull was manufactured at Green Marine in Lymington, Hampshire, and is constructed from Fibre reinforced plastic (FRP). The fitting out was completed at the yards of Devonport Management Limited in Devonport, Plymouth, Devon. The lengthy process of fitting out involves all the main components being fitted into the vessel and secured to their mounting points. Once this has been done the component units are removed from the hull leaving the mounts in place and the interior is then painted. The lifeboat was built at a cost of £2.5 million and was launched on 26 April 2007.

=== Lifeboat house modifications ===
Extensive work had to be carried out at the lifeboat station to upgrade the 38 metre pier end slipway to take the new- shaped vessel as well as alterations being carried out to the boathouse. The work on the station was carried out by the platform rig Haven Seaway between August and October 2007.

== Career ==
After her launch the Lester ON 1287 underwent a long period of sea trials. Around 30 Cromer crewmen took part in these trials to familiarise themselves with their new lifeboat. On 8 October 2007 the lifeboat crew took part in a week of training aboard the new lifeboat at the RNLI Lifeboat college in Poole, Dorset. The lifeboat finally arrived at Cromer on 9 December 2007 and was recovered, for the first time, up her new slipway in to the boathouse. and the vessel was officially operational from 6 January 2008.

=== First service ===
Lester ON 1287 was launched on her first service on 14 January 2008. She attended the car carrier MF The City of Sunderland which had gone aground in the early hours of the morning on the southern edge of Happisburgh Sands. The car carrier had been on passage from Zeebrugge to Tees Port near Middlesbrough. When the Lester arrived at the scene, two tugs from Felixstowe were attempting to tow the vessel off the sands. Assisting with the operation the crew of the lifeboat kept a watchful eye on the situation and stood by while the vessel carried out essential checks to her steering and propulsion systems once she was re-floated. The lifeboat finally left the scene at 23:50 and made her way back to the pier boathouse for recovery.

== Service and rescues ==
Date	Casualty	Lives saved
14 January 2008	Car carrier The City of Sunderland had gone aground on the edge of Happisburgh Sands, stood by.	
1 April 2008	Yacht, carried out a search for vessel, stood down when vessel located by Wells lifeboat.	
29 April 2008	Cable Laying Barge UR101 of Aberdeen, take off an injured man.	
10 May 2008	Catamaran Leyla, rendered assistance.	
29 June 2008	Powerboat Silverline with steering failure, towed into Lowestoft.	
11 July 2008	Yacht Cloud Nine developed electrical failure, rendered assistance.	
23 July 2008	Car Ferry Pride of Bruges reported sighting of life raft; after search concluded that there was no life raft.	
30 July 2008	Assisted in search for a missing person around Cromer Shore area. Daughter boat Y-207 launched from Lester to assist in search.	
2 December 2008	Car and passenger ferry Pride of Rotterdam reports a man overboard. Involved in search along with 6 other lifeboats, 2 Sea king Helicopters and coastguards for 7½ hours. No one found.	

== Gallery ==
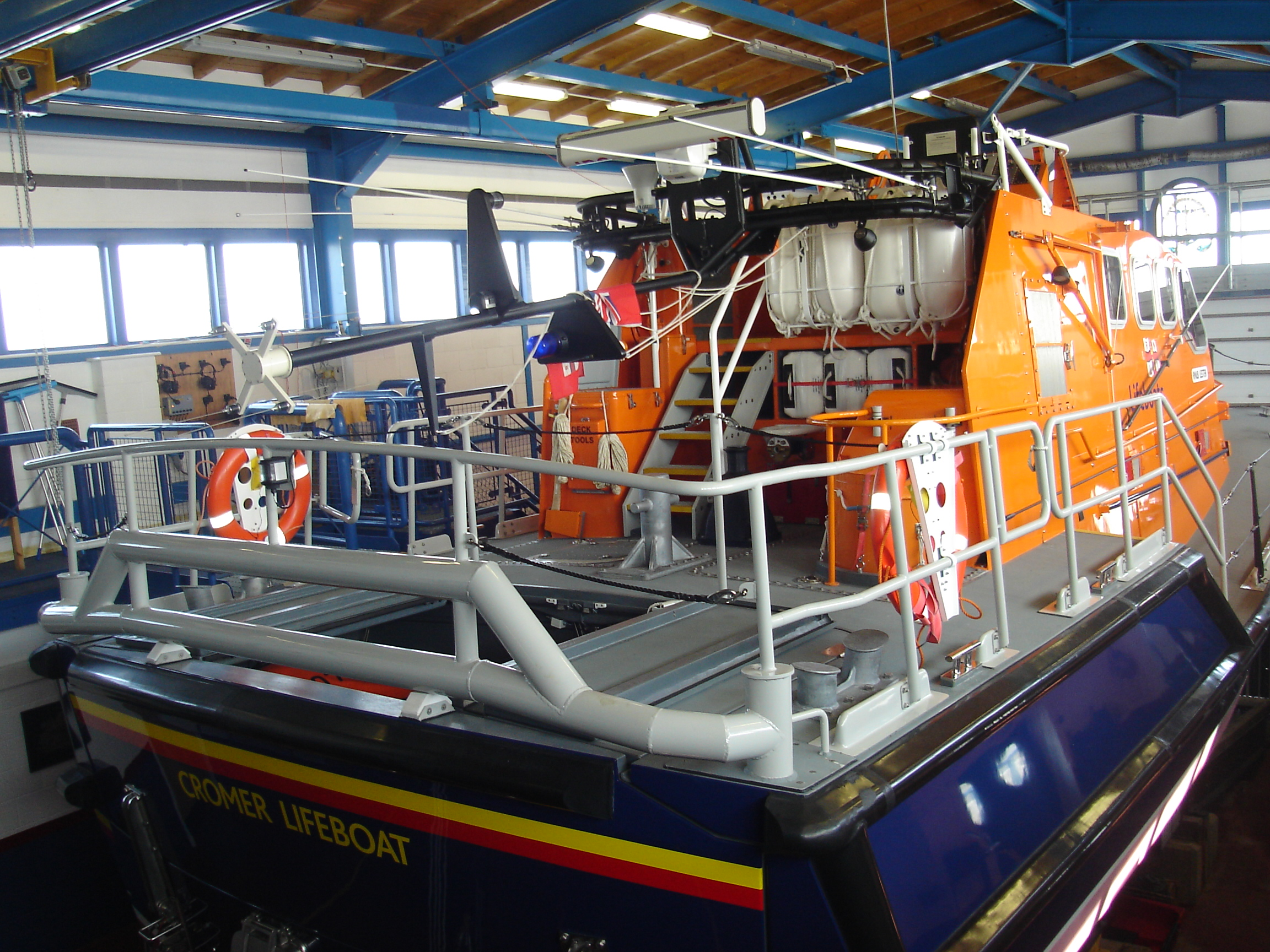
