= RNLB H F Bailey (ON 694) =

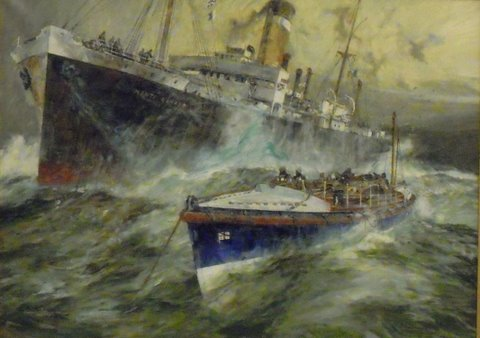
- H.F. Bailey ON694 service to the Monte Nevoso

History

British RNLI Flag
- Owner: Royal National Lifeboat Institution (RNLI)
- Builder: J. Samuel White, Cowes, Isle of Wight.
- Official Number: ON 694
- Donor: Legacy of Henry Francis Bailey, Brockenhurst, Surrey.
- Station: Cromer
- Laid down: 1924
- Fate: She left Cromer in 1935 and was renamed the J.B. Proudfoot and served in the RNLI reserve fleet

General characteristics
- Type: Watson-class lifeboat
- Length: 45 ft 0 in (13.72 m) overall
- Beam: 12 ft 6 in (3.81 m)
- Installed power: single Weyburn petrol engine of 80 bhp (60 kW)

RNLB H F Bailey (ON 694) was the second lifeboat at Cromer in the county of Norfolk to bear the name of "H F Bailey". She replaced H F Bailey (ON 670) which had been stationed at Cromer until 1924. In 1936 she became the station's reserve lifeboat and was renamed J B Proudfoot.

== Description ==
The lifeboat was built by J. Samuel Whites at Cowes in the Isle of Wight in 1923. She was a Watson-class lifeboat and had a length of 45 feet (14 m) and breadth of 12 feet 6 inches (3.81 m). She was powered by a single Weyburn 80 hp petrol engine.

== Donor ==
The Cromer station had four motor-powered lifeboats all called H F Bailey after the donor, Henry Francis Bailey of Brockenhurst, a London merchant who was born in Norfolk and died in 1916.

== Service and rescues ==
As H F Bailey (ON 694)
Date	Casualty	Lives saved
22 September 1924	Auxiliary fishing cutter Iona of Middlesbrough, landed 4 from Haisborough light vessel	4
22 October 1924	Steamship Clansman of Lowestoft	9
5 December 1924	Steamship Vojvoda Putnik of Split, assisted to save vessel	41
27 December 1924	Smith Knoll light vessel, rendered assistance	
19 April 1925	Steam drifter Couronne of Lowestoft	8
12 June 1925	Steamship Equity of Goole, rendered assistance	
14 October 1925	Barge Scotia of London, assisted to save vessel	3
9 July 1927	Steam Trawler Anson of Grimsby, saved trawler	9
21–22 November 1927	Steam tanker Georgia of Rotterdam	15
25 January 1928	Ketch Harrold of London, assisted to save vessel	3
28 June 1929	River steamship Empress of Nottingham	3
30 October 1929	Four masted schooner Svenberg of Vardo, stood by vessel	
22 November 1929	Motor yacht Celia of Bridlington, Landed 2	
21 October 1930	Steam drifter Girl Evelyn of Fraserburgh, assisted to save vessel	
17 February 1931	Fishing boat Welcome Home of Sheringham, saved	1
4 October 1931	Steam trawler Le Vieux Tigre of Boulogne-sur-Mer, rendered assistance	
20–22 November 1931	Steamship Zembra of Dunkirk, saved vessel	
24 December 1931	Steamship Vikvall of Oskarshamn, rendered assistance	
7 August 1932	Motor trawler Iverna of Galway, rendered assistance	
3 September 1932	Motor barge Olive May of London, rendered assistance	
11 October 1932	Steam drifter Alexandrine of Boulogne-sur-Mer, stood by vessel and gave help	
14–16 October 1932	Steamship Monte Nevoso of Genoa, saved	29 plus one dog
14–16 October 1932	Steam tug Noordzee of Rotterdam, saved from Monte Nevoso	1
28 November 1932	Barge Matilda Upton of Ipswich, assisted to save vessel	3
1 March 1933	Steamship Mary Kingsley of London, rendered assistance	
20 November 1933	Motor barge Goldcrown of London, rendered assistance	
13 December 1933	Barge Sepoy of Dover, saved	2
24 November 1934	Motor barge Rian of Groningen, rendered assistance	
13 February 1935	Steamship Campus of Cardiff, assisted to save vessel	29
31 May 1935	Three masted schooner Six Sisters of Hull, rendered assistance	
As reserve lifeboat J B Proudfoot (ON694)
16 June 1940	Steamship Brika of Swansea, assisted to save vessel	
