= Cromer Lifeboat Station =

RNLI lifeboat station in Norfolk, England

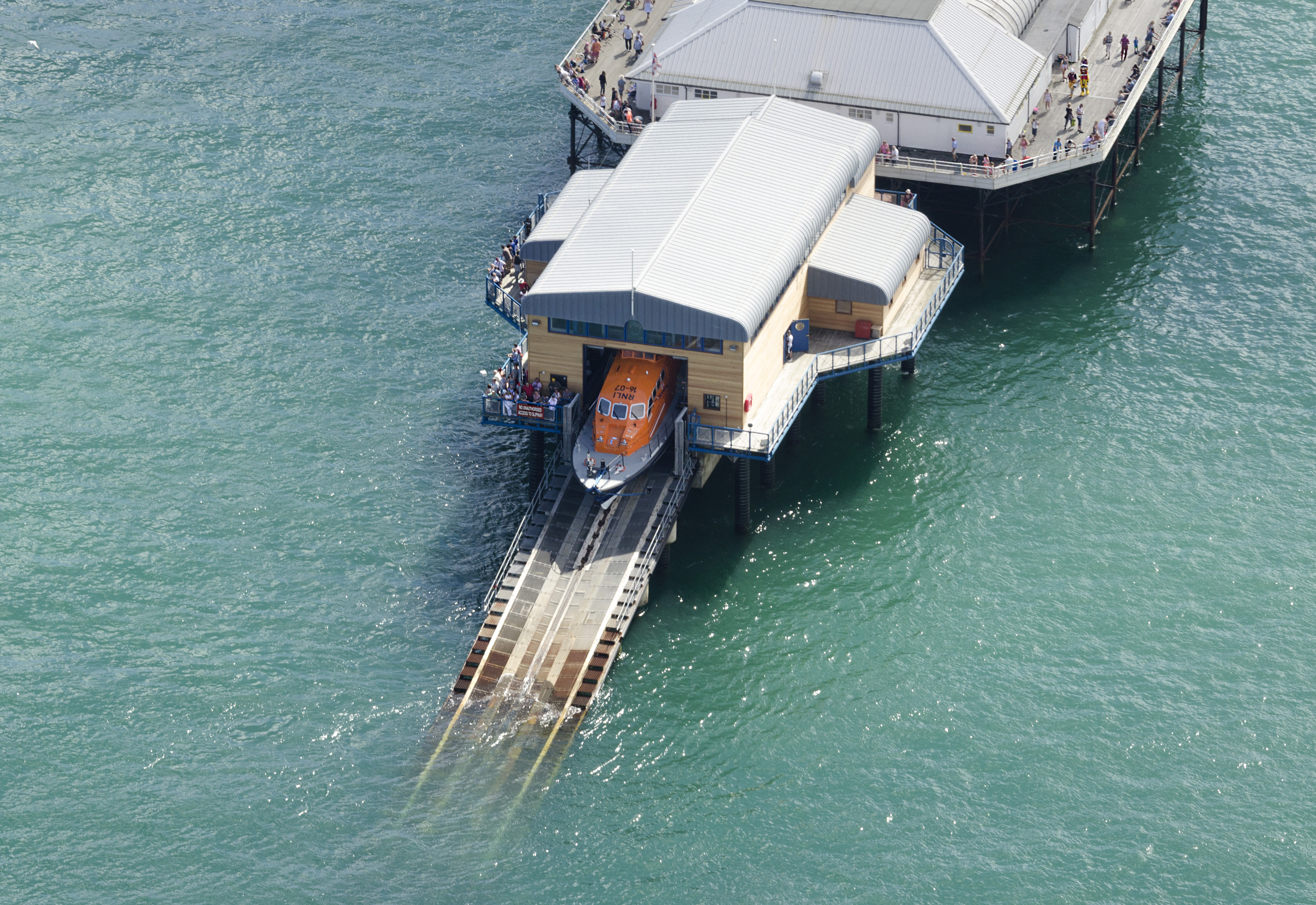
- Cromer All-weather Lifeboat Station

- Location within Norfolk

General information
- Type: Lifeboat Station
- Location: Cromer Lifeboat Station, 1: Cromer Pier; 2: Brunswick Terrace, Cromer, Norfolk, England
- Coordinates: 52°56′3.4″N 1°18′5.84″E
- Opened: 1804
- Owner: Royal National Lifeboat Institution

Website
- Cromer RNLI Lifeboat Station

Cromer Lifeboat Station is located in Cromer, a seaside town located approximately 23 miles (37 km) north of Norwich, on the north-east coast of the English county of Norfolk.

A lifeboat was first placed at Cromer in 1804 by a local committee, being taken over by the Norfolk Shipwreck Association (NSA) in 1823. Management of the station was transferred to the Royal National Lifeboat Institution (RNLI) in December 1857.

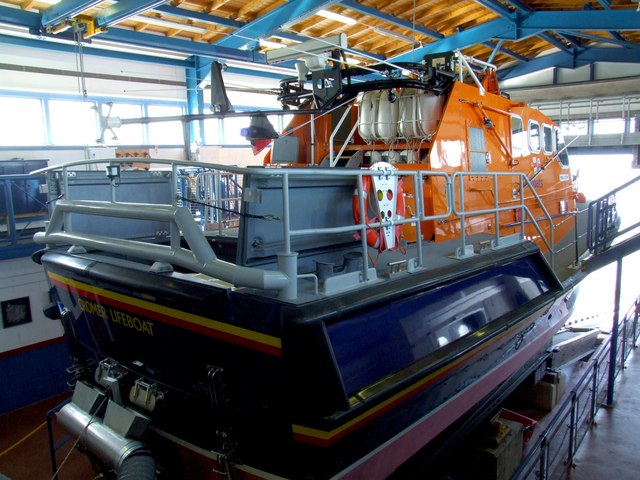
Tamar-class 16-07 Lester (ON 1287)

The station comprises two station buildings. A large boathouse, completed in 1999, sits at the end of Cromer Pier, and houses the Tamar-class All-weather lifeboat 16-07 Lester (ON 1287), on station since 2007. A smaller boathouse, built in 1902, and located at the foot of Brunswick Terrace, is home to the D-class (IB1) Inshore lifeboat Mr Eric Sharpe (Civil Service No.54) (D-868), on station since 2022.

The lifeboat service in Cromer predates the establishment of the RNLI, with volunteer crews gaining several Medals for gallantry. Notable coxswains, such as Henry George Blogg GM BEM and Henry "Shrimp" Thomas Davies BEM, have carried out multiple publicised rescues.

== History ==
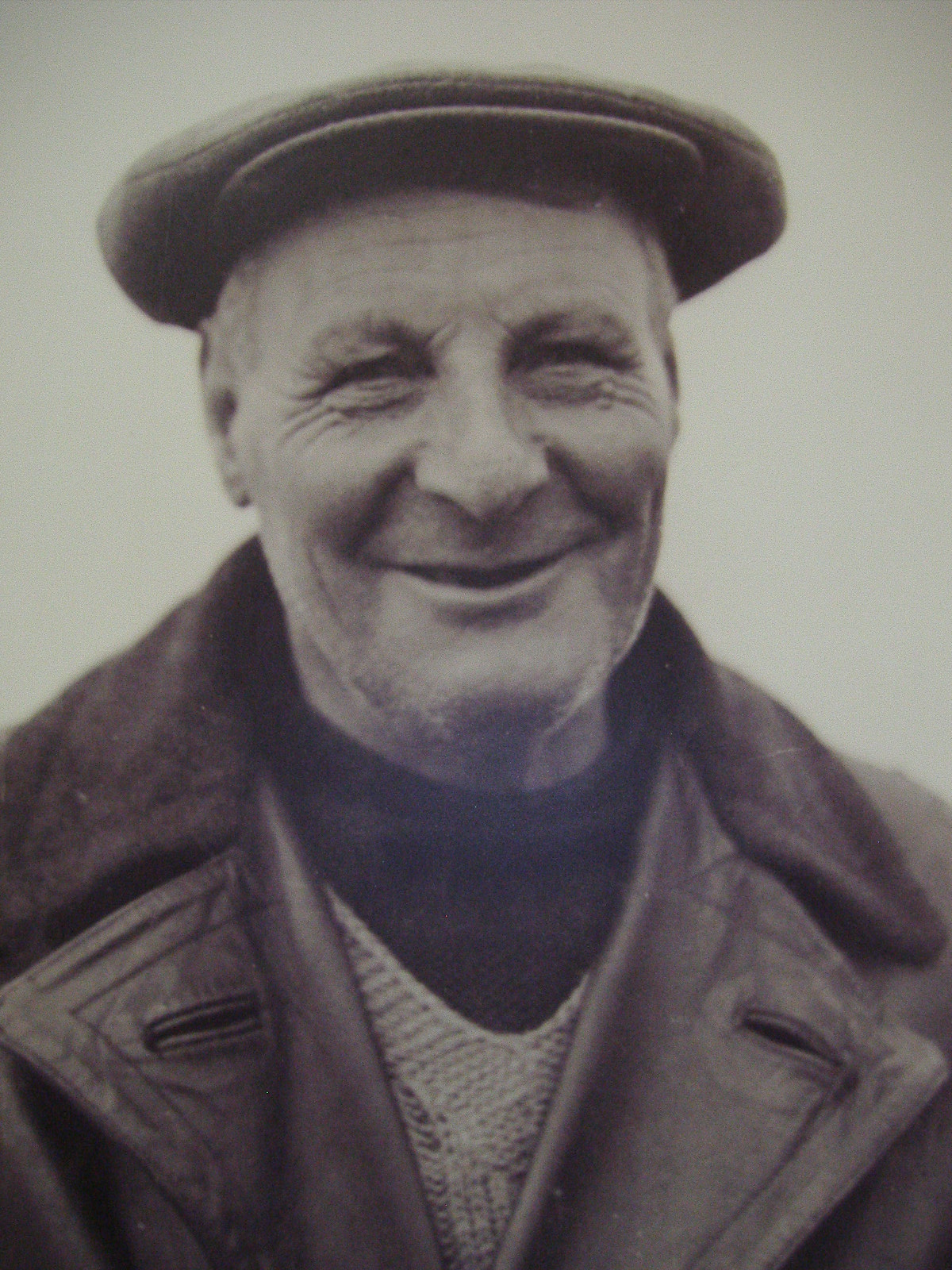
Henry George Blogg GC BEM

In the early days of the station, the lifeboats were kept outdoors on the east jetty. From 1804, a privately operated service was funded by subscription, which was administered by a local committee, led by Lord Suffield, the third baron of Gunton Hall. Other committee members included George Wyndham of Cromer Hall, Thomas Mickleburgh, a local merchant, Joseph Gurney, a Cromer draper, and grocer Benjamin Rust.

In 1823, management of the station was taken over by the Norfolk Shipwreck Association (NSA), who became responsible for lifeboat stations between Hunstanton and Gt. Yarmouth. This continued until 1857, until the NSA fell into financial troubles, with the lifeboats in a declining state of repair. At a meeting of the NSA on 21 November 1857, it was decided that the whole operation of the NSA be transferred to the management of the RNLI. This was formally agreed at a meeting of the RNLI committee of management on Thursday 3 December 1857.

The NSA had built a lifeboat house at Cromer, which once stood some 100 yards from the high-water mark, close to where the Inshore lifeboat station now stands. The RNLI altered and renovated this station at a cost of £46-2s-7d, but by the mid-1860s, this station had outlived its usefulness and a new boathouse was planned.

The new site was on the east gangway, and work started on the new station in 1867. The new boathouse project also included building an extension to the sea walls, and a slipway across the top of the beach. The work cost £476-4s-0d and was carried out by a local builder by the name of E. Simmons. The cost of the station was met by Benjamin Bond Cabbell, who also provided a new lifeboat for the station, costing £306. The lifeboat, a 34-foot self-righting 'Pulling and Sailing (P&S) lifeboat, one with sails and oars, was duly named Benjamin Bond Cabbell.

In 1883, the Benjamin Bond Cabbell was unable to make progress whilst attempting to get away to the aid of the schooner Alpha. The schooner was driven ashore, with the crew of five rescue by the Rocket Brigade. The Benjamin Bond Cabbell was abandoned on the shore, the crew dissatisfied with the boat and its lack of power (oars). Subsequent meetings and discussions brought about the arrival of a new lifeboat, a 14-oared non-self-righting lifeboat, based on the designs of their old North Country lifeboat, which was in use up to 1858. The new boat, later to be known as a Cromer-class lifeboat, was again named Benjamin Bond Cabbell (ON 12).

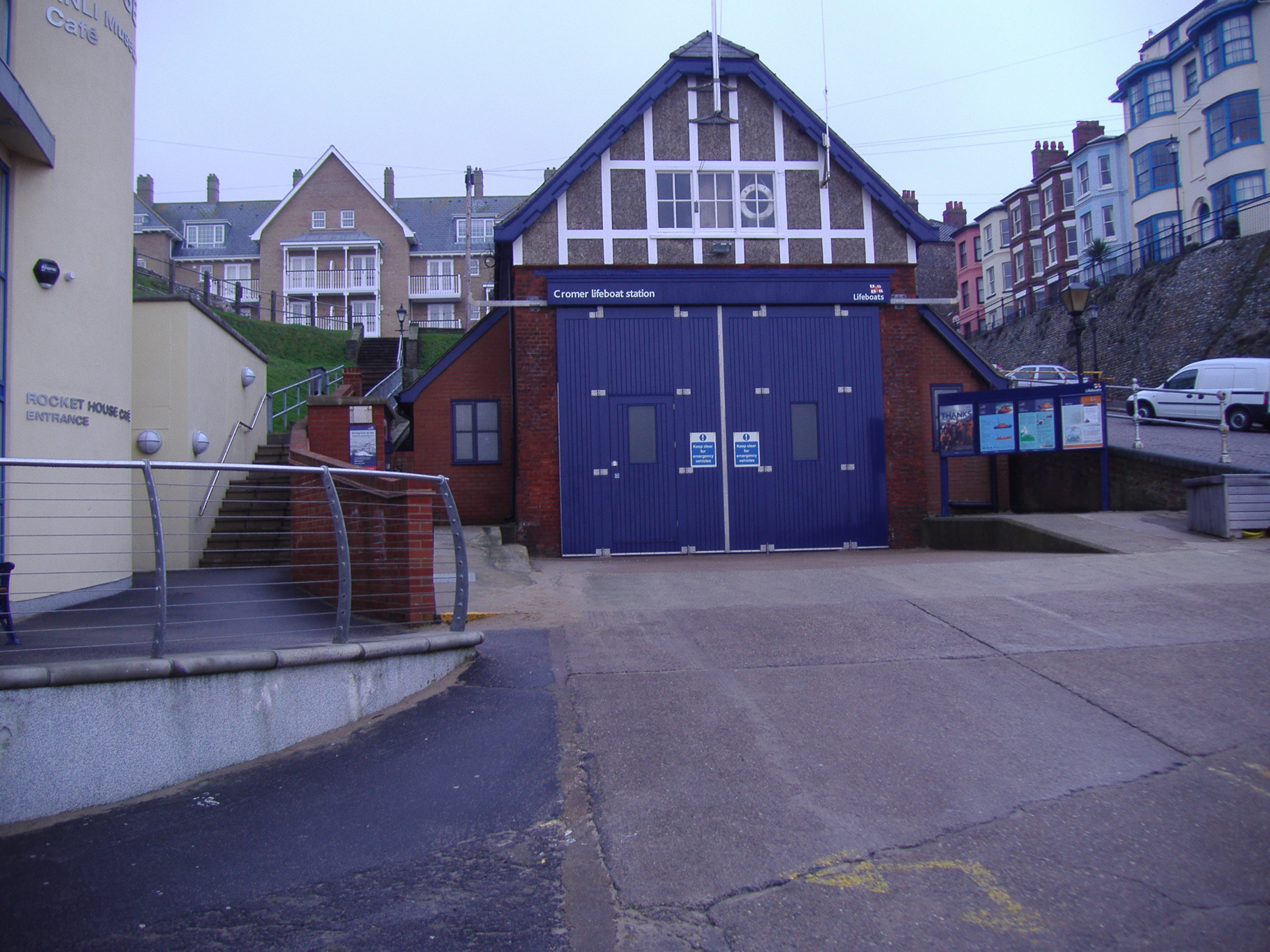
1902 lifeboat house at Cromer.

A new 38-foot Liverpool-class P&S lifeboat was placed on station in 1902. The cost of the new lifeboat and equipment was defrayed from the bequest of Miss Emily Heartwell of Holloway, London. At a ceremony on 9 September 1902, the new boathouse was inaugurated, and after a short service of dedication by Rev. J. F. Sheldon, the lifeboat was named Louisa Heartwell (ON 495).

At least three-feet longer than any previous Cromer lifeboat, a new boathouse was required, and was constructed at the end of the esplanade, at the foot of Brunswick Terrace, at a cost of £525.

When the new 46-foot 6in motor-powered lifeboat H. F. Bailey (ON 670) arrived on station in 1923, the 1902 boathouse would now not be large enough. Another new boathouse was again required. This time, a much larger boathouse, with a roller slipway, was constructed at the end of Cromer Pier, at a cost of £32,000. The pulling and sailing lifeboat Louisa Heartwell (ON 495) was retained as a No. 2 lifeboat.

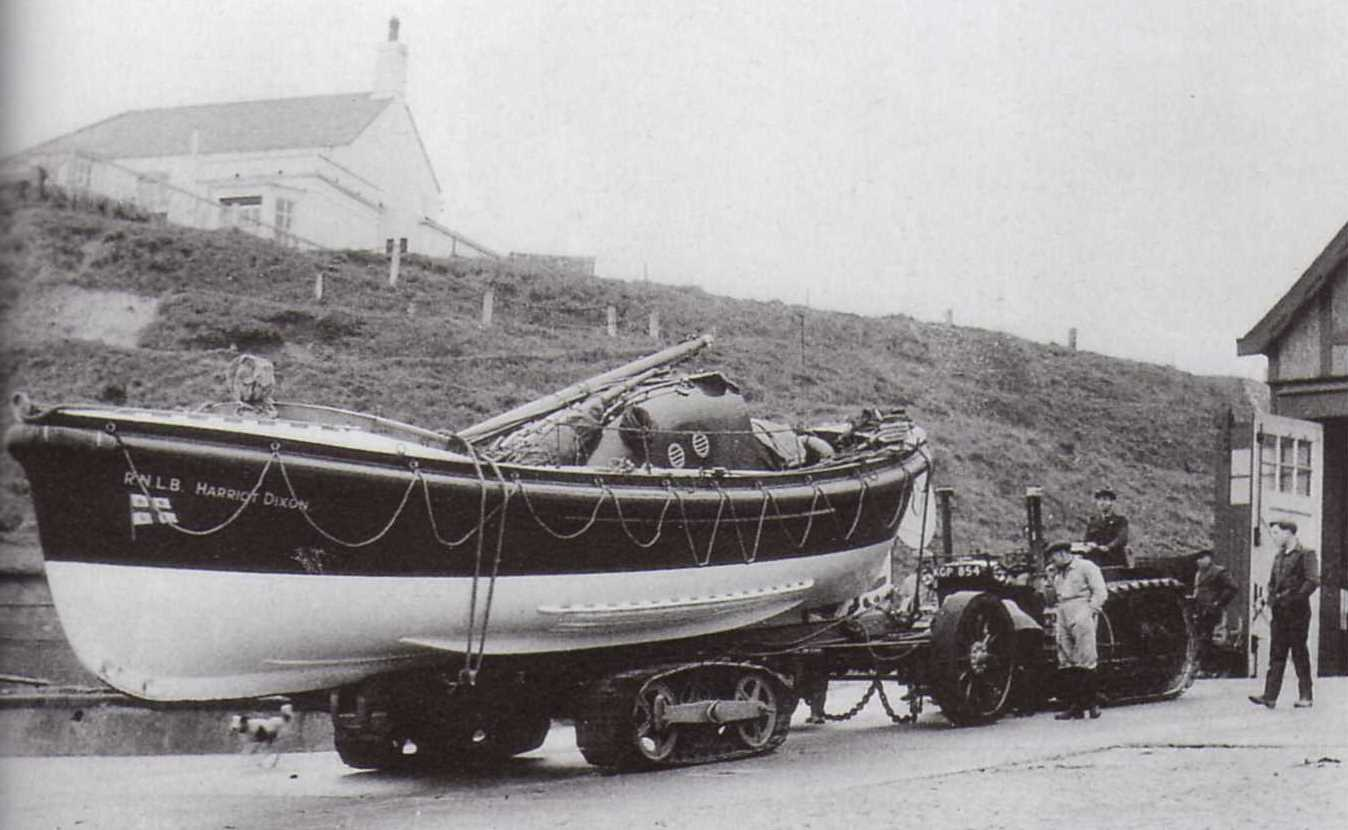
Cromer No. 2 lifeboat Harriot Dixon (ON 770)

A remarkable period of service would occur at Cromer between 1927 and 1941. No fewer than 37 RNLI Medals for gallantry were awarded, along with multiple awards from various governments and The Queen of The Netherlands.

- 21–22 November 1927, Dutch tanker Georgia, 1 x Gold, 12 x Bronze
- 17 February 1931, Fishing boat Welcome Home, 1 x Bronze
- 14–16 October 1932, Monte Nevoso of Genoa, 1 x Silver
- 13 December 1933, Barge Sepoy, 1 x Silver
- 9–10 October 1939, S.S. Mount Ida, 1 x Silver, 3 x Bronze
- 6–7 August 1941, 6 vessels in convoy, 1 x Gold, 1 x Silver, 3 x Bronze
- 26–27 October 1941, Steamship English Trader, 1 x Silver, 11 x Bronze (incl 1 posthumous)

Cromer continued to operate two All-weather lifeboats until 1967, when the No. 2 boat was withdrawn. The lifeboat on station at the time, the 37-foot Oakley Mk I lifeboat 37-13 William Henry and Mary King (ON 980), was transferred first to Bridlington, and later to North Sunderland. The withdrawal of the second All-weather lifeboat saw the introduction of a new D-class (RFD PB16) Inshore lifeboat (ILB), (D-101). The 1902 boathouse is still the home of the Inshore boat.

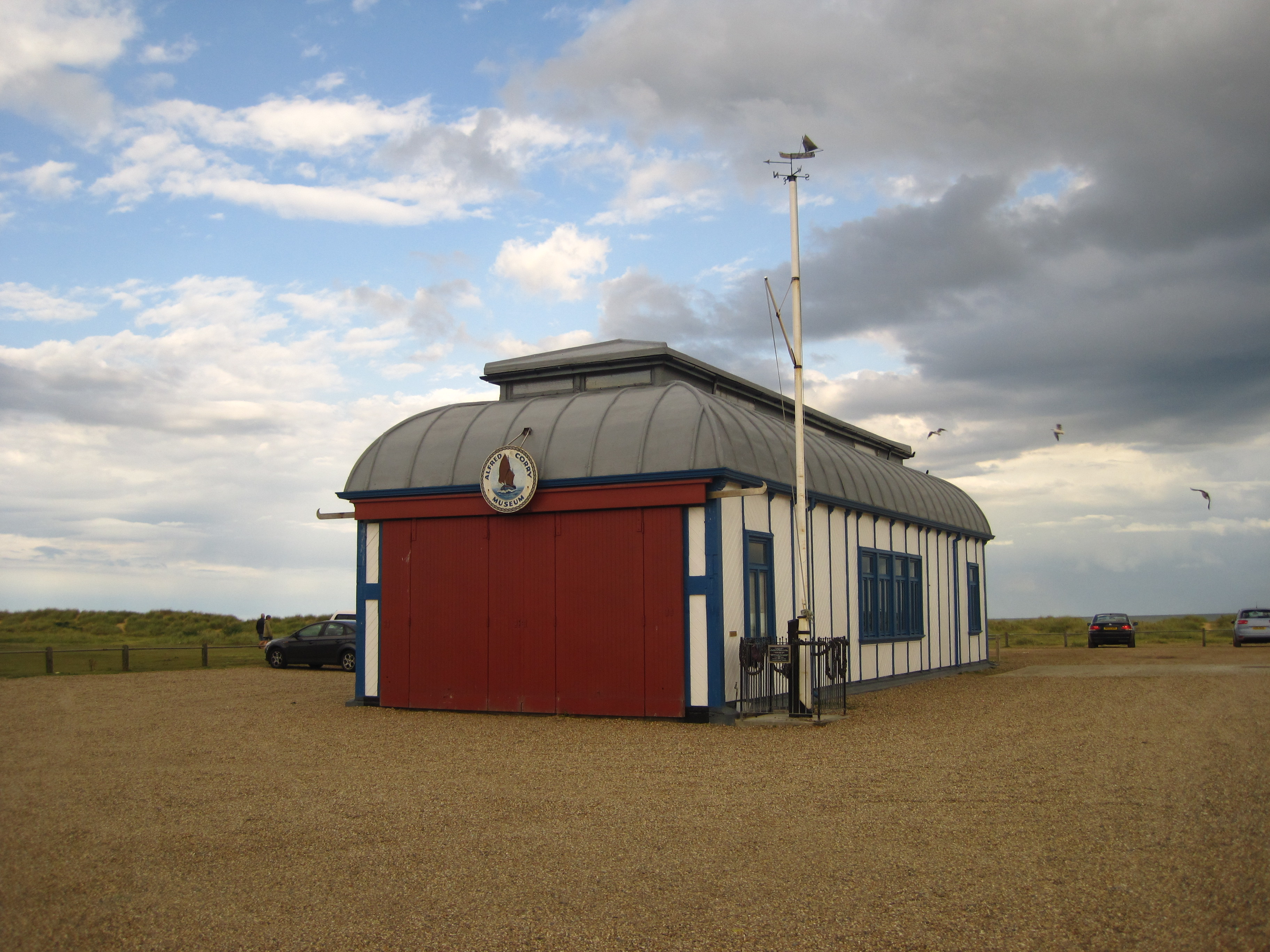
The 1923 Cromer boathouse at Southwold, now the Alfred Corry Lifeboat Museum

Towards the end of the 1990s, it was decided that the 1923 pier boathouse had reached the end of its serviceable lifetime, especially in the face of the elements at the end of the pier.

The structure was removed in two halves, and transported by sea along the coast to Southwold, where it was reassembled. It is now home to the Alfred Corry Lifeboat Museum, its main exhibit being the 44-foot Norfolk and Suffolk-class (P&S) former Southwold lifeboat RNLB Alfred Corry (ON 353).

The Cromer Pier boathouse was replaced between 1997 and 1999, costing approximately £3 million, funded by bequests and private donations.

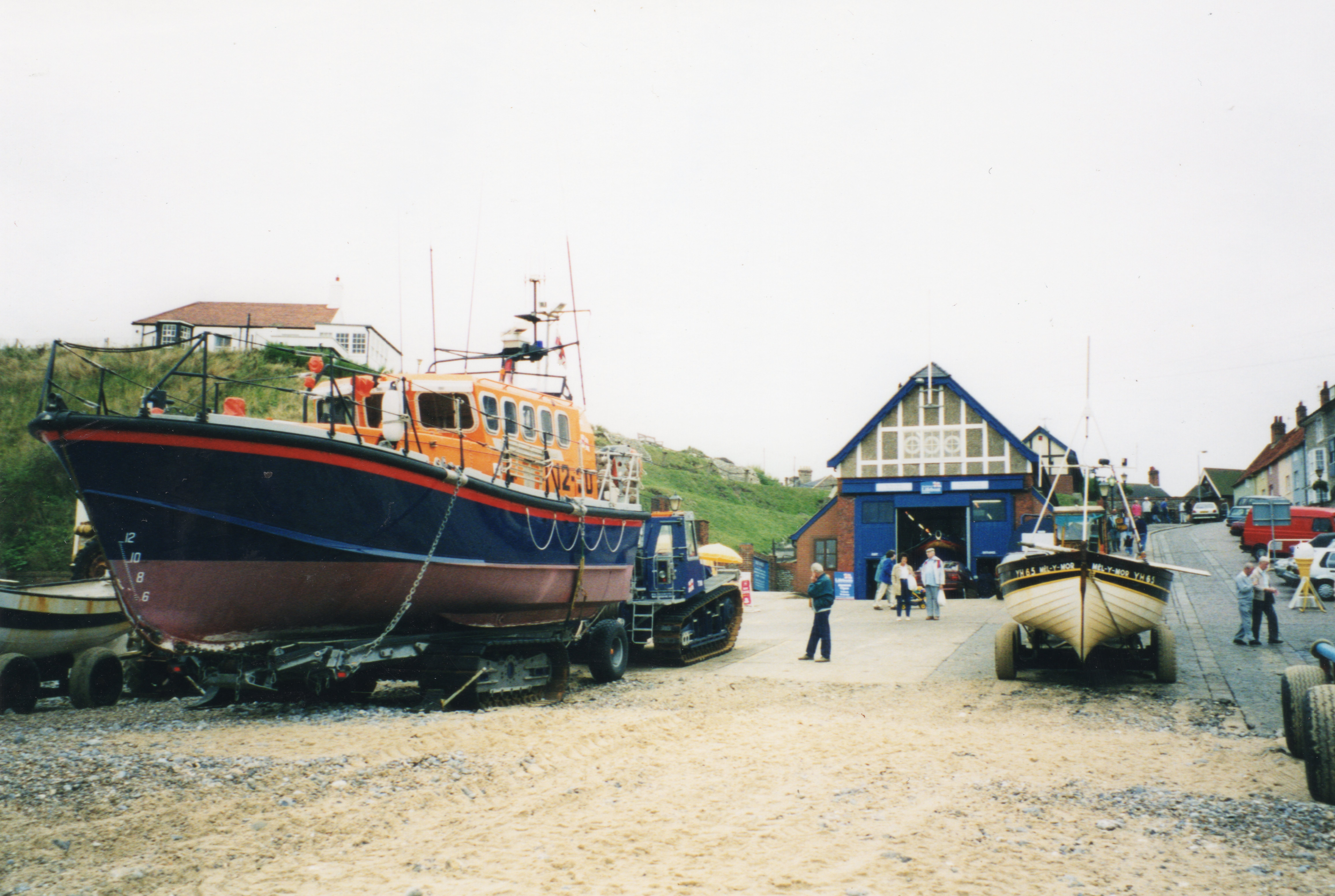
Mersey-class lifeboat 12-30 Her Majesty the Queen (ON 1189), on station during the pier boathouse rebuild, near the ILB lifeboat station.

During this period, the Ruby and Arthur Reed II was temporarily placed in the relief fleet, and a carriage launched Mersey-class lifeboat, 12-30 Her Majesty The Queen (ON 1189), was stationed on the shore next to the 1902 boathouse.

In 2007, the Tyne-class lifeboat was withdrawn, and a new Tamar-class All-weather lifeboat assigned to the station. Modifications to the slipway were required, and a second carriage-launched Mersey-class lifeboat, 12-004 Royal Shipwright (ON 1162), was placed at Cromer for one year.

The new Tamar-class lifeboat arrived on station in 2008. At a ceremony on 8 September, H.R.H The Duke of Kent named the lifeboat 16-07 Lester (ON 1287).

== Station honours ==
The following are awards made at Cromer.

- Medal of the Order of the British Empire for Gallantry (EGM)

Henry George Blogg – 1924

- George Cross
  converted from EGM

Henry George Blogg – 1941

- British Empire Medal for Meritorious Service

Henry George Blogg GC, Coxswain – 1941

- British Empire Medal for Gallantry
  Henry Thomas Davies, Coxswain – 1970
- RNLI Gold Medal
  Henry George Blogg, Coxswain – 1917
  Henry George Blogg EGM, Coxswain – 1927 (Second-Service clasp)
  Henry George Blogg GC, Coxswain – 1941 (Third-Service clasp)
- RNLI Silver Medal
  Hon. Auberon Herbert – 1867
  William Davies, Acting Second Coxswain - 1917
  Private Stewart Holmes, 2/4th Battalion, Seaforth Highlanders – 1917
  Henry George Blogg EGM, Coxswain – 1932
  Henry George Blogg EGM, Coxswain – 1934 (Second-Service clasp)
  Henry George Blogg EGM, Coxswain – 1939 (Third-Service clasp)
  John James Davies, Second Coxswain – 1941
  Henry George Blogg GC, Coxswain – 1941 (Fourth-Service clasp)
- RNLI Bronze Medal
  George Allen, crew member – 1917
  James Allen, crew member – 1917
  Edward Walter Allen, crew member – 1917
  William Allen, crew member – 1917
  Henry Balls, crew member – 1917
  Charles Cox, crew member – 1917
  George Cox, crew member – 1917
  Leslie James Harrison, crew member – 1917
  Tom Kirby, crew member – 1917
  Gilbert Mayers, crew member – 1917
  Walter Rix, crew member – 1917
  William Rix, crew member – 1917
  George Balls, Second Coxswain – 1927
  John James Davies (Sr), Bowman – 1927
  Robert Davies, Mechanic – 1927
  William Thomas Davies, Assistant Mechanic – 1927
  Edward Walter Allen, crew member – 1927 (Second-Service clasp)
  Richard J. Baker, crew member – 1927
  George Cox, crew member – 1927
  Harry William Davies, crew member – 1927
  James William Davies, crew member – 1927
  John James Davies (Jr), crew member – 1927
  Leslie James Harrison, crew member – 1927 (Second-Service clasp)
  Sidney Charles Harrison, crew member – 1927
  John James Davies (Sr), Bowman – 1931 (Second-Service clasp)
  John Davies (Sr), Second Coxswain – 1939 (Third-Service clasp)
  Henry William Davies, Mechanic – 1939 (Second-Service clasp)
  James William Davies, Assistant Mechanic – 1939 (Second-Service clasp)
  Henry William Davies, Mechanic – 1941 (Third-Service clasp)
  Leslie James Harrison, Second Coxswain – 1941 (Third-Service clasp)
  Harold V. Linder, Mechanic – 1941
  John James Davies (Sr), Second Coxswain – 1941 (Fourth-Service clasp)
  Henry William Davies, Mechanic – 1941 (Fourth-Service clasp)
  James William Davies, Assistant Mechanic – 1941 (Third-Service clasp)
  William Thomas Davies, Bowman – 1941 (Second-Service clasp)
  Edward Walter Allen, Signalman – 1941 (Third-Service clasp) (posthumous)
  Henry Thomas Davies, crew member – 1941
  James Richard Davies, crew member – 1941
  John James Davies (Jr), crew member – 1941 (Second-Service clasp)
  Robert C. Davies, crew member – 1941
  William H. Davies, crew member – 1941
  Sidney Charles Harrison, crew member – 1941 (Second-Service clasp)
  Dr Paul Stuart Barclay MC TD – 1974
  Clive Richard Rayment, Helm – 1981
  Richard William Davies, Coxswain – 1994
- Medal service certificates
  Frank H. Muirhead, crew member – 1981
  Christopher B. Craske, crew member – 1981
- The Thanks of the Institution inscribed on Vellum
  Henry Thomas Davies BEM, Coxswain – 1974
  R. W. Davies, crew member – 1974
  Richard Davies, Coxswain – 1989
  William Davies, Second Coxswain – 1998
  Richard Davies, Coxswain – 1999
- A Collective Letter of Thanks signed by the Chairman of the Institution
  R. W. Davies, Coxswain – 1991
  W. T. Davies, Second Coxswain – 1991
  R. J. Hannah, Mechanic – 1991
  J. W. H. Jonas, Assistant Mechanic – 1991
  P. Jefferies, crew member – 1991
  P. Everitt, crew member – 1991
  H. Balls, crew member – 1991
  J. Howard, crew member – 1991
- Silver Medal of the Canine Defence League
  Henry George Blogg EGM, Coxswain – 1932
- Gold Watch, awarded by The Queen of The Netherlands
  Henry George Blogg EGM, Coxswain – 1927
- Silver watch, awarded by The Queen of The Netherlands
  Each of the other members of the lifeboat crew – 1927
- Silver medal and a diploma awarded by The Italian Government
  Henry George Blogg EGM, Coxswain – 1932
- Bronze medals and diploma awarded by The Italian Government
  Each of the other members of the lifeboat crew – 1932
- French Maritime Cross, awarded by The French Government
  Henry Thomas Davies, Coxswain – 1948
- Life-saving medal, awarded by The French Government
  Each of the other 11 members of the lifeboat crew – 1948
- British Empire Medal
  Edwin Luckin, Boathouse Manager – 2023NYH

== Roll of honour ==
In memory of those lost whilst serving Cromer lifeboat.

- Died on 21 September 1918, after becoming paralysed whilst assisting the launch of the lifeboat H. F. Bailey (ON 670), on service to the Swedish vessel Fernebo on 9 January 1917.
  John Sharp, Driver
- Collapsed and died of heart failure shortly after being recovered to the lifeboat H. F. Bailey (ON 777), after five lifeboat crew, including Henry Blogg, were washed overboard, whilst on service to the steamship English Trader on 26–27 October 1941.
  Edward Walter Allen, Signalman (49)
  (Allen was posthumously awarded his third RNLI Bronze Medal).

== Cromer lifeboats ==
=== Pulling and Sailing (P&S) lifeboats (Cromer / Cromer No.1) ===
ON (Note: ON is the RNLI's Official Number of the boat.)	Name	Built	On station	Class	Comments
—	Unnamed	1804	1804–1830	25-foot Greathead	(Note: 25-foot x 8-foot 6in (10-oared) Greathead-class non-self-righting lifeboat, built by Henry Greathead of South Shields.)
Pre-148	Unnamed	1830	1830–1858	31-foot North Country	(Note: 31 ft (9.4 m) x 9 ft 6 in (2.90 m) (10-oared) North Country non-self-righting lifeboat, built by Robson of South Shields, costing £160.)
Pre-338	Unnamed	1858	1858–1868	34-foot Peake Self-righting (P&S)	(Note: 34 ft (10 m) x 8 ft 3 in (2.51 m) (12-oared) self-righting (P&S) lifeboat, from RNLI funds, built by Forrest of Limehouse, London, costing £213.)
Pre-518	Benjamin Bond Cabbell	1868	1868–1884	34-foot Self-righting (P&S)	(Note: 34 ft (10 m) x 8 ft 9 in (2.67 m) (10-oared) self-righting (P&S) lifeboat, legacy of Mr B. B. Cabbell of London, built by Woolfe of Shadwell, London, costing £307.)
12	Benjamin Bond Cabbell	1884	1884–1902	35-foot Cromer	(Note: 35 ft (11 m) x 10 ft (3.0 m) (14-oared) Cromer-class non-self-righting lifeboat, legacy of Miss Ann Edgell of Alnwick, built by James Beeching of Great Yarmouth, costing £365.); Sold 1902, became houseboat Lorna Doone at Great Yarmouth.
495	Louisa Heartwell	1902	1902–1923	38-foot Liverpool (P&S)	(Note: 38 ft (12 m) x 10 ft 9 in (3.28 m) (14-oared) Liverpool-class non-self-righting (P&S) lifeboat, legacy of Miss E. Heartwell of London, built by Thames Ironworks of Blackwall, London, costing £982.); Moved to Cromer No. 2 in 1923.

=== Motor lifeboats (Cromer / Cromer No.1) ===
ON	Op. No. (Note: Op. No. is the RNLI's Operational Number of the boat carried on the hull.)	Name	Built	On station	Class	Comments
670	—	H. F. Bailey	1923	1923–1924	46-foot 6in Norfolk and Suffolk	Cromer's first motor lifeboat. Transferred to Gorleston in 1924 and renamed to John and Mary Meiklam of Gladswood. Sold in 1952 and now preserved at Gorleston.
694	—	H. F. Bailey	1924	1924–1928	45-foot Watson	
714	—	H. F. Bailey II	1928	1928–1929	45-foot 6in Watson	Transferred to Selsey in 1929 where it was named Canadian Pacific. Sold in 1937, but destroyed by fire the same year.
694	—	H. F. Bailey	1924	1929–1935	45-foot Watson	Later used at Southend-on-Sea and Dover. Sold in 1956 and used as a yacht, reported to be at Marbella, Spain in 2019.
777	—	H. F. Bailey (III)	1935	1935–1945	46-foot Watson	Later stationed at Helvick Head. Sold in 1973 and preserved at the Henry Blogg Museum at Cromer since 2009.
840	—	Millie Walton	1945	1945–1947	46-foot Watson	Initially named Millie Walton but renamed Henry Blogg in 1947, following the retirement of Henry Blogg.
840	—	Henry Blogg	1945	1947–1966	46-foot Watson	Sold in 1977. Converted to a motor cruiser, renamed Blogg of Cromer, but broken up in 2016.
990	48-03	Ruby and Arthur Reed	1966	1967–1984	48-foot 6in Oakley MkII	48 ft 6 in (14.78 m) Mark II Oakley design. Transferred to St Davids. Sold in 1988 but preserved at Hythe, Hampshire since 1990.
926	—	Guy and Clare Hunter	1954	1984–1985	46-foot 9in Watson	First stationed at St Mary's in 1955. Sold in 1988 and became a pleasure boat at Donaghadee.
1097	47-006	Ruby and Arthur Reed II	1985	1985–1996	Tyne	
1189	12-30	Her Majesty The Queen	1992	1996–1999	Mersey	Carriage-launched lifeboat used while the boathouse was being rebuilt.
1097	47-006	Ruby and Arthur Reed II	1985	1999–2007	Tyne	Sold for further SAR use in China, numbered Hua Ying 385.
1162	12-004	Royal Shipwright	1990	2007–2008	Mersey	Carriage-launched used while the slipway was being rebuilt for a new Tamar-class lifeboat.
1287	16-07	Lester	2007	2008–	Tamar	

Pre ON numbers are unofficial numbers used by the Lifeboat Enthusiasts' Society to reference early lifeboats not included on the official RNLI list.

=== Pulling and Sailing (P&S) lifeboats (Cromer No.2) ===
When the station received its first motor lifeboat, a No.2 station was established located in the old boathouse. The station was closed in 1967, replaced with a D-class Inshore lifeboat.

ON	Name	Built	On station	Class	Comments
495	Louisa Heartwell	1902	1923–1931	38-foot Liverpool (P&S)	Previously Cromer No. 1. Sold in 1931, now (2024) undergoing restoration at Chatham Historic Dockyard.
514	Alexandra	1903	1931–1934	35-foot Liverpool (P&S)	(Note: 35 ft (11 m) x 10 ft (3.0 m) (12/14-oared) non-self-righting (P&S) lifeboat, gift of the Freemasons of England, built by Thames Ironworks of Blackwall, London, costing £945.)Previously at Hope Cove. Sold in 1934 and now a holiday home in Siel, Scotland, June 2024.

=== Motor lifeboats (Cromer No.2) ===
ON	Op. No.	Name	Built	On station	Class	Comments
770	—	Harriot Dixon	1934	1934–1964	Liverpool	Sold in 1964 but now being restored at Stiffkey.
980	37-13	William Henry and Mary King	1964	1964–1967	37-foot Oakley Mk I	Later stationed at Bridlington and North Sunderland. Sold in 1990, now in Drayton Park school playground in Highbury, London, December 2024.

=== Inshore lifeboats ===
Op. No.	Name	On station	Model	Comments
D-101	Unnamed	1967–1970	D-class (RFD PB16)	
D-26	Unnamed	1970–1971	D-class (RFD PB16)	First stationed at Walmer in 1965.
D-197	Unnamed	1972–1984	D-class (RFD PB16)	
D-307	Spirit of Round Table	1984–1992	D-class (EA16)	
D-436	Chloe	1992–2001	D-class (EA16)	
D-568	Seahorse III	2001–2010	D-class (EA16)	
D-734	George & Muriel	2010–2022	D-class (IB1)	
D-868	Mr Eric Sharpe (Civil Service No.54)	2022–	D-class (IB1)	

=== Launch and recovery tractors ===
Op. No.	Reg. No.	Type	On station	Comments
T7	AF 4215	Clayton	1938	
T3	MA 6793	Clayton	1938–1939	
T19	TY 2547	Clayton	1939–1949	
T49	KGP 854	Case LA	1949–1960	
T51	KLA 85	Case LA	1960–1964	
T78	BYN 568B	Case 1000D	1964–1967	
T98	C168 NAW	Talus MB-H Crawler	1996–1999	
T108	F133 FUJ	Talus MB-H Crawler	2007–2008	

== See also ==
- List of RNLI stations
- List of former RNLI stations
- Royal National Lifeboat Institution lifeboats
