= Youghal Lifeboat Station =

RNLI Lifeboat station in County Cork, Ireland

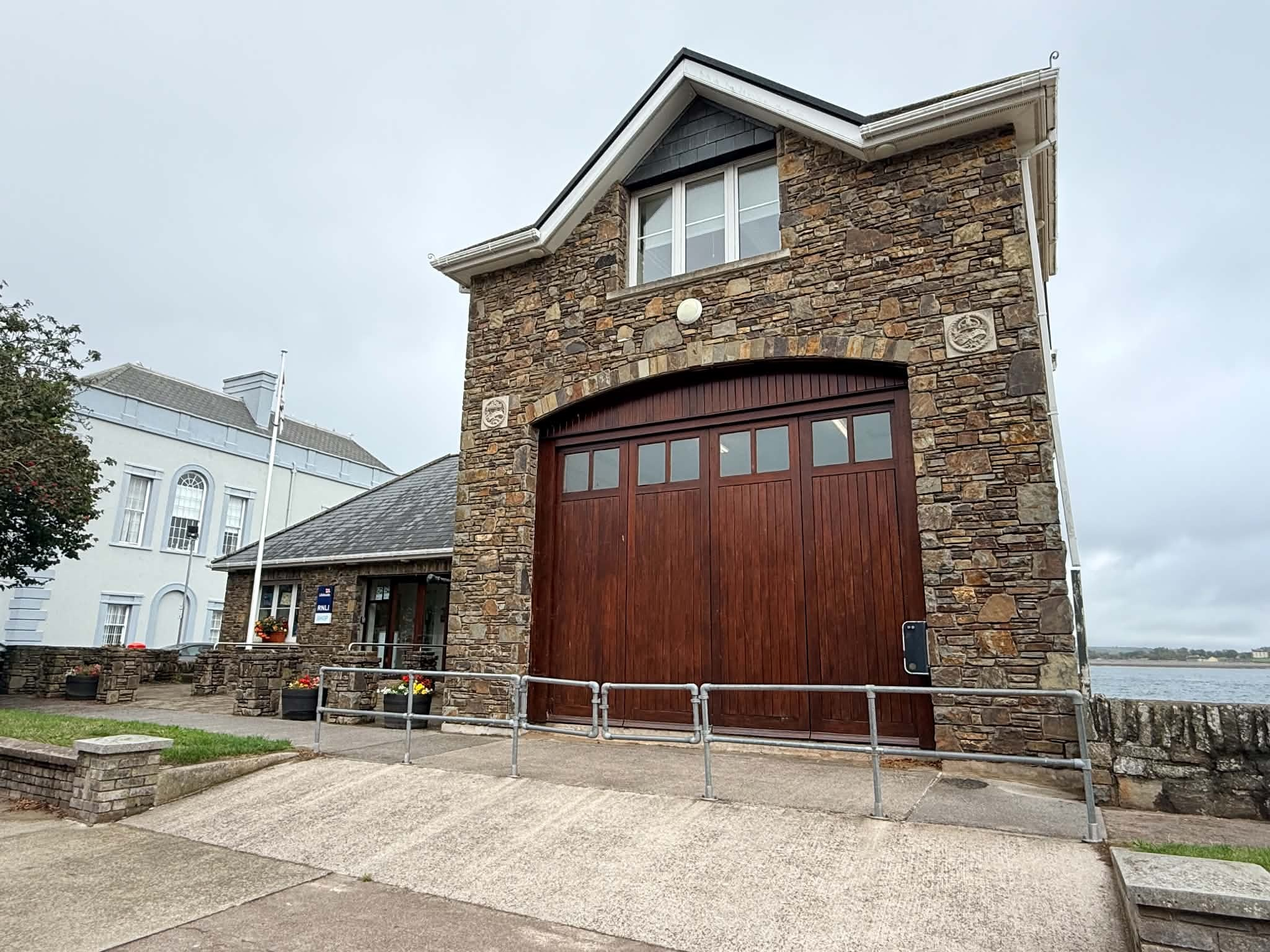
- Youghal Lifeboat Station in 2026

- Location within Ireland

General information
- Type: RNLI Lifeboat Station
- Location: Lifeboat Station, The Mall, Youghal, County Cork, Ireland
- Coordinates: 51°57′05.2″N 07°50′39.0″W
- Opened: 1839 Youghal Harbour Trust; 1857 RNLI
- Owner: Royal National Lifeboat Institution

Website
- Youghal RNLI Lifeboat Station

Youghal Lifeboat Station is located on The Mall, in Youghal, a town situated on the western bank of the River Blackwater estuary in County Cork, approximately 48.5 kilometres (30.1 mi) east of the city of Cork, on the south coast of Ireland.

A lifeboat was placed at Youghal by the Youghal Harbour Trust in 1839. Management of the station was taken over by the Royal National Lifeboat Institution (RNLI) in 1857.

The station currently operates a B-class (Atlantic 85) Inshore lifeboat, Gordon and Phil (B-890), on station since 2016.

== History ==
Ever since the founding in 1824, awards for gallantry at sea were given by the Royal National Institution for the Preservation of Life from Shipwreck (RNIPLS), later to become the RNLI, even if no lifeboats are involved.

On 13 February 1828, the sloop Mermaid was driven ashore at Whiting Bay, County Waterford, on passage from Newport to Cork. Five crew, including one boy, were rescued by means of rocket lines. Lt. Richard James Morrison, RN, of H.M. Coastguard, was awarded the RNIPLS Silver Medal.

However, it was the wreck of other vessels, such as the paddlesteamer Killarney at Roberts Cove, County Cork, on passage from Cork to Bristol, with the loss of 24 lives, that prompted calls for a lifeboat to be placed at Youghal.

The Youghal Harbour Trust was set up in 1838, and a 26-foot 6-oared Palmer-class lifeboat was commissioned from Taylor of Limehouse, costing £76, arriving at Youghal in 1839. On the first recorded service on 23 February 1840, Lieutenant Metherell, RN, took charge of the lifeboat, which was transported 7 miles (11 km) by hand to Ardmore, where the brigantine Medora had been wrecked whilst on passage to Swansea. Metherell, with six other coastguard, and another seaman, then set out into difficult conditions, and rescued the four crew. Lt. Richard Roe Metherell, RN, H.M Coastguard, was awarded the RNIPLS Gold Medal.

By 1856, there had been few other service calls, and a visiting Inspector of Lifeboats found the boat in a yard, in a neglected state. In 1857, the RNLI took over the management of the Youghal lifeboat. A new 30 ft (9.1 m) Peake-class self-righting 'Pulling and Sailing' (P&S) lifeboat, one with oars and sails, was transported, from London to Cork free of charge by the Cork River Steamer Company, and then onwards to Youghal. Having always previously been exposed to the elements, the lifeboat would now have a new boathouse, which was constructed at Green Hole, near Green Park, at a cost of £100. The Duke of Devonshire, a principal landowner in the town, was one of the main contributors to the cost of the lifeboat station.

A slightly larger lifeboat was placed at Youghal in 1867. Funded by the people of Leeds, and costing £250, the boat was named William Beckett of Leeds after the president of the local RNLI branch. Taken to Leeds en route to Youghal from London, it was parade around the town, and then placed on display at the Town Hall, where it was formally handed over to the RNLI by the mayor of Leeds. It was then transported via Liverpool, and given free passage to Cork by the steamship company.

Many people had felt that the location of the lifeboat house at Green Hole was poor. It was difficult to launch there in certain conditions, and the RNLI had been looking for an alternative. The new site was found at The Mall, next to the Town Hall, and a new boathouse was constructed at a cost of £275. Although recently modernised, the lifeboat station remains on this same site today.

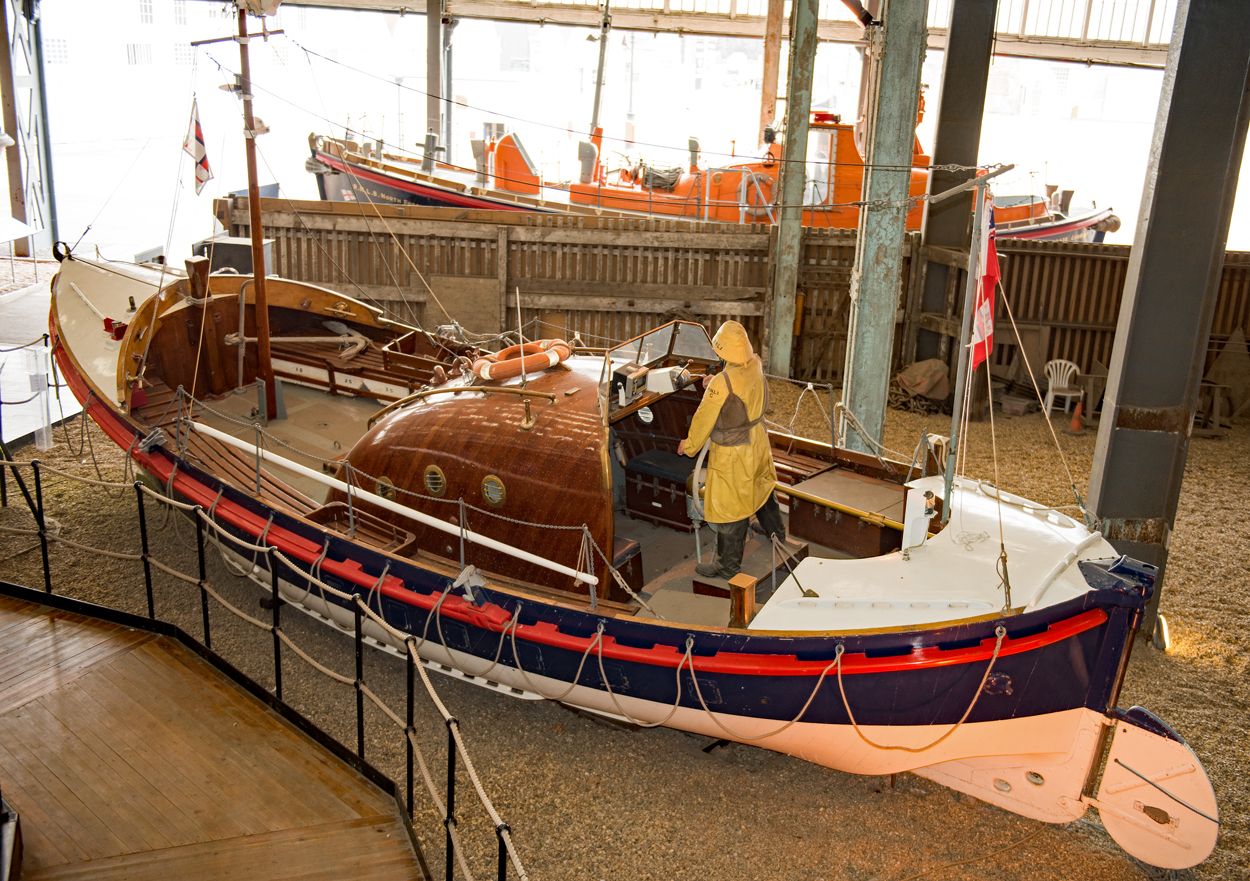
RNLB Grace Darling at Chatham Historic Dockyard

Lifeboat coxswain Jackie Foley and his crew were dispatched to England in 1931, to collect Youghal's first motor-powered lifeboat. The 35-foot 6in long lifeboat had a single 35-hp 'Weyburn AE6' Petrol-engine, capable of delivering a top-speed of 7 knots (13 km/h; 8.1 mph), with a range of 116 miles (187 km). Henry Hayes was appointed as mechanic. At a ceremony on 7 July 1931, the lifeboat was named Laurana Sarah Blunt (ON 744), the lifeboat funded by the gift of Dr. G. Vernon Blunt of Birmingham.

After serving for 13 years at North Sunderland, and a period in the relief fleet, the last of the Liverpool-class lifeboats, built in 1954, would be the last All-weather lifeboat at Youghal. The 35-foot 6in lifeboat was the Grace Darling (ON 927), the crew travelling over to Littlehampton to collect the boat, and arrived back in Youghal in July 1971.

In 1984, the Grace Darling was withdrawn and retired, and the Atlantic 21-class Marjorie Turner (B-561) was placed on station. As a medal winning lifeboat at North Sunderland, and the last of her type, Grace Darling (ON 927) is now preserved in the RNLI Heritage Collection at Chatham Historic Dockyard.

== Inshore lifeboat ==
In 1983, a B-class (Atlantic 21) Inshore lifeboat was sent to the station for evaluation. The Inshore boat required fewer personnel, both to crew the boat and for launching, and was capable of 30 knots (56 km/h; 35 mph), four times faster than the Grace Darling.

Successful trials were carried out in 1995, using a Talus MB-764 amphibious tractor launch tractor and Drive Off - Drive On (Do-Do) carriage. Modifications were made to the boathouse, and the slipway rails removed, the work being completed in October 1996. In 2002, a new boathouse was constructed, at a cost of £463,001.

In 2016, Youghal received their latest Inshore lifeboat, the B-class (Atlantic 85) Gordon and Phil (B-890). The boat was funded from the bequest of the late Gwenda J. Bull of Brighton. At a ceremony on 10 September 2016, the lifeboat was named in memory of the donor's parents, E. J. Gordon and Phyllis Bull.

== Station honours ==
The following are awards made at Youghal.

- RNIPLS Gold Medal
  Lt. Richard Roe Metherell, RN, H.M Coastguard, Youghal – 1840
- RNIPLS Silver Medal
  Lt. Richard James Morrison RN, H.M. Coastguard, Youghal – 1828
  Charles Edington, Chief Officer of H.M. Coastguard, Knockadoon – 1836
- RNLI Silver Medal
  James Harry Long, Honorary Secretary of the Youghal branch – 1894
  Michael Hannagan, Coxswain Superintendent – 1906
- RNLI Bronze Medal
  Richard Hickey, Coxswain – 1963
- Certificate awarded by the Comhairle na Míre Gaile
  Council for the Recognition of Deeds of Bravery
  John Murphy, Motor Mechanic – 1968
  Michael Hennessy, Bowman – 1969

== Roll of honour ==
In memory of those lost whilst serving Youghal lifeboat.

- Crushed between boat and door post, as the lifeboat was being pulled from the boathouse, 30 December 1873
  Michael O'Brien, launcher

== Youghal lifeboats ==
=== Youghal Harbour Trust lifeboats ===
Name	Built	On station	Class	Comments
Unnamed	1839	1839–1851	26-foot Palmer	(Note: 26 ft 6 in (8.08 m) x 5 ft 9 in (1.75 m) (6-oared) Palmer-class lifeboat, funded by the Youghal Harbour Trust, built by Taylor of Blackwall, London, costing £76.); Condemned in 1851, and sold in 1857.

=== Pulling and Sailing (P&S) lifeboats ===
ON (Note: ON is the RNLI's Official Number of the boat.)	Name	Built	On station	Class	Comments
Pre-311	Unnamed	1857	1857–1867	30-foot Peake self-righting (P&S)	(Note: 30 ft 0 in (9.14 m) x 7 ft 6 in (2.29 m) (10-oared) Peake-class self-righting (P&S) lifeboat, funded by the RNLI, built by Forrestt of Limehouse, London, costing £158.); Found decayed, and broken up in 1867.
Pre-495	William Beckett of Leeds	1867	1867–1885	32-foot Prowse self-righting (P&S)	(Note: 32 ft 0 in (9.75 m) x 7 ft 6 in (2.29 m) (10-oared) Prowse-class self-righting (P&S) lifeboat, funded by the Leeds LB fund, built by Woolfe of Shadwell, London, costing £250.); Sold in 1885.
102	Mary Luckombe	1885	1885–1906	34-foot self-righting (P&S)	(Note: 34 ft 0 in (10.36 m) x 8 ft 0 in (2.44 m) (10-oared) self-righting (P&S) lifeboat, legacy of Mrs M. Luckombe of Brighton, built by Forrestt of Limehouse, London, costing £355.); Broken up in December 1906.
564	Marianne L. Hay	1906	1906–1931	35-foot self-righting (P&S)	(Note: 35 ft 0 in (10.67 m) x 8 ft 6 in (2.59 m) (10-oared) self-righting (P&S) lifeboat, legacy of Col. J. A. Hay of Cheltenham, built by Thames Ironworks of Blackwall, London, costing £839.); Sold in 1931. Last reported as Marion in 1934.

Pre ON numbers are unofficial numbers used by the Lifeboat Enthusiasts' Society to reference early lifeboats not included on the official RNLI list.

=== All-weather lifeboats ===
ON	Name	Built	On station	Class	Comments
744	Laurana Sarah Blunt	1931	1931–1952	35-foot 6in self-righting (motor)	
825	Herbert John	1939	1952–1966	Liverpool	Previously at Cloughey.
872	J. B. Couper of Glasgow	1949	1966–1971	Liverpool	Previously at St Abbs and Kirkcudbright. Transferred to the Relief fleet, later at Poole.
927	Grace Darling	1954	1971–1984	Liverpool	Previously at North Sunderland

All-weather lifeboat withdrawn, 1984
More post-service details can be found on the respective lifeboat class pages.

=== Inshore lifeboats ===
==== B class ====
Op.No. (Note: Op. No. is the RNLI's Operational Number of the boat carried on the hull.)	Name	On station	Class	Comments
B-537	Unnamed	1983–1984	B-class (Atlantic 21)	On station for evaluation.
B-561	Marjorie Turner	1984–2002	B-class (Atlantic 21)	
B-590	Wolverson X-Ray	2002	B-class (Atlantic 21)	
B-780	Patricia Jennings	2002–2016	B-class (Atlantic 75)	
B-890	Gordon and Phil	2016–	B-class (Atlantic 85)	

=== Launch and recovery tractors ===
Op.No.	Reg.No.	Type	On station	Comments
TW14	87-D-38843	Talus MB-764 County	1996–1999	
TW30	L123 HUX	Talus MB-764 County	1999–2005	
TW42	97-G-8631	Talus MB-764 County	2005–	

== See also ==
- List of RNLI stations
- List of former RNLI stations
- Royal National Lifeboat Institution lifeboats
- Talus Atlantic 85 DO-DO launch carriage
