= Liverpool-class lifeboat =

Former RNLI lifeboat class

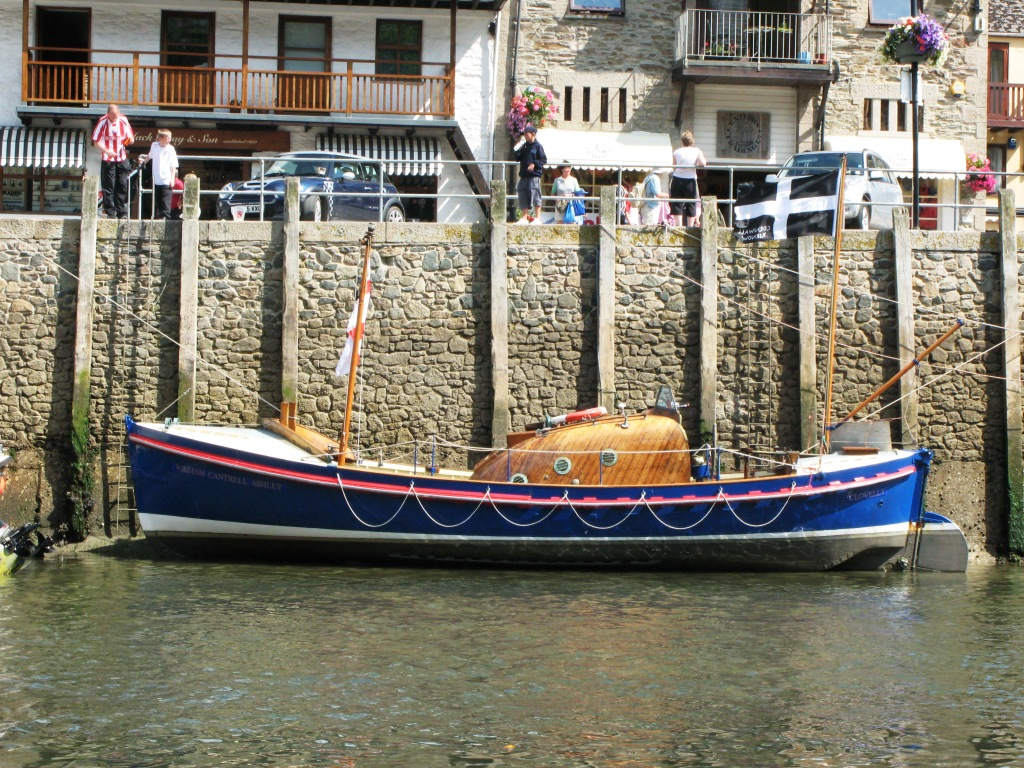
- Former Clovelly, twin engined RNLB William Cantrell Astley (ON 871)

Class overview
- Builders: Groves and Guttridge of Cowes; Thornycroft of Chiswick; J. Samuel White of Cowes; Saunders-Roe of Cowes; Morgan Giles of Teignmouth; Rowhedge Ironworks of Rowhedge
- Operators: Royal National Lifeboat Institution
- Succeeded by: Oakley
- Built: Single engine: 1931–1941; Twin engine: (1940), 1945–1954
- In service: 1931–1992
- Completed: Single engine: 28; Twin engine: 32
- Retired: 60

General characteristics
- Type: Motor lifeboat
- Displacement: 6–8 tons
- Length: 35 ft 6 in (10.82 m)
- Beam: single: 10 ft (3.0 m) – 10 ft 3 in (3.12 m); twin:10 ft 8 in (3.25 m)
- Propulsion: single engine: 1 x 35 hp (26 kW) Weyburn AE6 6-cyl. petrol; 1 x 47 hp (35 kW) Parsons Porbeagle 4-cyl. diesel; twin engine: 2 x 18 hp (13 kW) Weyburn AE4 4-cyl. petrol; 2 x 20 hp (15 kW) Ferry Kadenacy FKR3 3-cyl. diesel; 2 x 32 hp (24 kW) Perkins 4.107 4-cyl. diesel
- Speed: 6.5–7.5 knots (12.0–13.9 km/h; 7.5–8.6 mph)
- Range: 70–120 nautical miles (130–220 km; 80–140 mi)
- Crew: 7

The Liverpool-class motor lifeboat was a non-self-righting lifeboat operated by the Royal National Lifeboat Institution (RNLI) from its stations around the coast of the United Kingdom and Ireland. The boats were designed for carriage launching and were developed from the Liverpool-Class Pulling and Sailing type of lifeboats. There were two types built, single and twin engined.

== History ==
The Liverpool-class lifeboat, designed by Scottish naval architect James Rennie Barnett, was derived from the 35ft 6in Self-righting motor-class lifeboat and had many similarities with it. Lifeboat men at many stations preferred non-self-righting lifeboats due to their better stability and the Liverpool-class was designed to be light enough for carriage launching at these stations. The single-engined version entered service in 1932 and was powered by an RNLI designed, Weyburn Engineering built AE6 six-cylinder 35 horsepower (26 kW) petrol engine mounted in a watertight compartment. Like all early motor lifeboats, the Liverpool class carried an auxiliary sailing rig and had a drop keel just forward of the engine room. 28 boats were built between 1931 and 1941.

The introduction of tractors to assist with carriage launching enabled the RNLI to consider a heavier, twin-engined version of the Liverpool class and a prototype was ordered, but it was destroyed in an air-raid at the builder's yard at Cowes in May 1942. Production got underway early in 1945 and the boat was powered by two 18 hp (13 kW) Weyburn AE4 four-cylinder petrol engines mounted in a watertight compartment. The extra redundancy of twin engines reduced the need for auxiliary sails. 31 boats were built between 1945 and 1954, the last 16 of which were powered by twin 20 hp (15 kW) Ferry Kadenacy FKR3 3-cylinder Diesel engines.

== Description ==
The Liverpool-class was based on the 35 ft 6 in (10.82 m) Self-righting motor introduced in 1929, but had greater beam (10 ft (3.0 m) rather than 8 ft 10 in (2.69 m)) and much shallower end-boxes. The shelter was extended forward to cover the engine compartment, which was watertight and allowed the engine to continue to operate as long as the air intake was not submerged. The single propeller was protected by the keel. The twin-engined variant was visually very similar but had 8 in (20 cm) more beam and the twin propellers were in protective tunnels.

In the mid-1960s, the petrol engines in the first ten twin-engined boats were replaced by 47 hp (35 kW) Perkins 4.107 4-cyl. diesel engines (as were a couple of the later Ferry-engined boats). Only one single-engined boat, Lucy Lavers (ON 832), was re-engined, with a 47-hp Parsons Porbeagle 4-cyl. diesel engine.

== Fleet ==
=== Single engine ===
ON (Note: ON is the RNLI's Official Number of the boat.)	Name	Built	In service	Station	Comments
750	Oldham	1931	1931–1952	Hoylake	(Note: 35 ft 6 in (10.82 m) x 10 ft (3.0 m) Liverpool-class lifeboat, gift of the Oldham LB fund, built by Groves and Guttridge of Cowes, costing £3,995.) Sold 1952. Renamed Grey Lass but broken up at Hoylake, November 1955.
760	Anne Allan	1932	1932–1953	Skegness	(Note: 35 ft 6 in (10.82 m) x 10 ft (3.0 m) Liverpool-class lifeboat, legacy of Mrs Allen, built by Thornycroft of Chiswick, costing £3,340.) Sold 1953. Restored to original condition, at Padstow, September 2025.
764	Nellie and Charlie	1933	1933–1950	Anstruther	(Note: 35 ft 6 in (10.82 m) x 10 ft (3.0 m) Liverpool-class lifeboat, legacy of Mr Neil Robertson of Pitlochry, built by J. Samuel White of Cowes, costing £3,416.) Sold April 1951. At R.W. Davis & Sons Ltd. Sharpness, September 2024.
765	Fifi and Charles	1933	1933–1962	Weston-super-Mare	(Note: 35 ft 6 in (10.82 m) x 10 ft (3.0 m) Liverpool-class lifeboat, legacy of Mr C. C. Ashley of Monton, France, built by J. Samuel White of Cowes, costing £3,207.) Sold October 1962. Renamed Wyvern. Last reported at Redon, Ille-et-Vilaine, Brittany, France, August 2008.
766	The Always Ready	1933	1933–1934	Runswick	(Note: 35 ft 6 in (10.82 m) x 10 ft (3.0 m) Liverpool-class lifeboat, legacy of Mrs E. B. Browne, built by J. Samuel White of Cowes, costing £3,187.) Renamed Robert Patton - The Always Ready at the naming ceremony in 1934, following the loss of Coxswain Robert Patton, who died in February 1934, nine days after being badly injured on service.
766	Robert Patton - The Always Ready	1933	1934–1954	Runswick	Sold May 1954. Renamed Alaska, later Alaska I. Now as The Always Ready at Saul Junction Marina, Gloucestershire, April 2025.
770	Harriot Dixon	1934	1934–1964	Cromer No.2	(Note: 35 ft 6 in (10.82 m) x 10 ft 3 in (3.12 m) Liverpool-class lifeboat, legacy of Mr Dixon, built by Groves and Guttridge of Cowes, costing £3,317.) Sold December 1964. Renamed Sareter. Now under restoration as Harriot Dixon at Stiffkey, Norfolk, December 2025.
771	The Three Sisters	1934	1934–1954	Coverack	(Note: 35 ft 6 in (10.82 m) x 10 ft (3.0 m) Liverpool-class lifeboat, legacy of Miss Quiller-Couch, built by J. Samuel White of Cowes, costing £3,248.) Sold 1954. Renamed Gay Dawn 2, Patricia Mary, Coverack and finally Silent Waters. Wheelhouse added, but was broken up at Rhos-on-Sea, October 2008.
772	Elizabeth and Albina Whitley	1934	1934–1948	Flamborough	(Note: 35 ft 6 in (10.82 m) x 10 ft 3 in (3.12 m) Liverpool-class lifeboat, legacy of Mr Whitley, built by Groves and Guttridge of Cowes, costing £3,295.) Sold January 1953. In storage as Albina at Stiffkey, Norfolk, December 2025
772	Elizabeth and Albina Whitley	1934	1948–1952	Reserve fleet	Sold January 1953. In storage as Albina at Stiffkey, Norfolk, December 2025
773	Joseph Braithwaite	1934	1934–1949	Maryport	(Note: 35 ft 6 in (10.82 m) x 10 ft (3.0 m) Liverpool-class lifeboat, legacy of Mr Braithwaite, built by J. Samuel White of Cowes, costing £3,210.) Sold December 1952. Last reported in storage as Seahawk in a back garden in Barry, Wales, January 2019.
773	Joseph Braithwaite	1934	1950–1952	Reserve fleet	Sold December 1952. Last reported in storage as Seahawk in a back garden in Barry, Wales, January 2019.
781	W.R.A.	1935	1936–1954	North Sunderland	(Note: 35 ft 6 in (10.82 m) x 10 ft 3 in (3.12 m) Liverpool-class lifeboat, legacies of Mr Gardiner, Miss Savage and Miss Matthews, built by J. Samuel White of Cowes, costing £3,447.) Sold 1958 to Guatemala Lifeboat Service, taking up service in 1959. See below.
781	W.R.A.	1935	1954–1958	Reserve fleet	Sold 1958 to Guatemala Lifeboat Service, taking up service in 1959. See below.
782	Margaret Dawson	1935	1936–1952	Gourdon	(Note: 35 ft 6 in (10.82 m) x 10 ft 3 in (3.12 m) Liverpool-class lifeboat, legacy of Mrs M. Dawson, built by J. Samuel White of Cowes, costing £3,437.) Sold 1956. Renamed LL23, Storm, Viking II and finally Viking. Wrecked and later broken up at Holyhead, June 2018.
782	Margaret Dawson	1935	1952–1955	Reserve fleet	Sold 1956. Renamed LL23, Storm, Viking II and finally Viking. Wrecked and later broken up at Holyhead, June 2018.
786	Foresters Centenary	1936	1936–1961	Sheringham	(Note: 35 ft 6 in (10.82 m) x 10 ft 3 in (3.12 m) Liverpool-class lifeboat, gift of the Ancient Order of Foresters, built by Groves and Guttridge of Cowes, costing £3,569.) Sold 1961. On display since 2004 at The Mo Sheringham Museum, December 2025.
791	Elizabeth Wills Allen	1936	1936–1950	Seaham	(Note: 35 ft 6 in (10.82 m) x 10 ft 3 in (3.12 m) Liverpool-class lifeboat, funded via the executors of the late Miss Allen, built by J. Samuel White of Cowes, costing £3,776.) Sold February 1953. Awaiting restoration at Stiffkey, Norfolk, December 2025.
791	Elizabeth Wills Allen	1936	1950–1953	Reserve fleet	Sold February 1953. Awaiting restoration at Stiffkey, Norfolk, December 2025.
792	Annie Ronald and Isabella Forrest	1936	1936–1949	St Abbs	(Note: 35 ft 6 in (10.82 m) x 10 ft 3 in (3.12 m) Liverpool-class lifeboat, gift of Miss A. Ronald and legacy of Mrs I. Forest, built by J. Samuel White of Cowes, costing £3,771.) Sold March 1965. Named ARIF, at Bedwells Yard, Walton-on-the-Naze, August 2025.
792	Annie Ronald and Isabella Forrest	1936	1949–1952	Reserve fleet	Sold March 1965. Named ARIF, at Bedwells Yard, Walton-on-the-Naze, August 2025.
792	Annie Ronald and Isabella Forrest	1936	1952–1953	Bridlington	Sold March 1965. Named ARIF, at Bedwells Yard, Walton-on-the-Naze, August 2025.
792	Annie Ronald and Isabella Forrest	1936	1953–1956	Reserve fleet	Sold March 1965. Named ARIF, at Bedwells Yard, Walton-on-the-Naze, August 2025.
792	Annie Ronald and Isabella Forrest	1936	1956–1958	Scarborough	Sold March 1965. Named ARIF, at Bedwells Yard, Walton-on-the-Naze, August 2025.
792	Annie Ronald and Isabella Forrest	1936	1958–1959	Reserve fleet	Sold March 1965. Named ARIF, at Bedwells Yard, Walton-on-the-Naze, August 2025.
792	Annie Ronald and Isabella Forrest	1936	1959–1964	Llandudno	Sold March 1965. Named ARIF, at Bedwells Yard, Walton-on-the-Naze, August 2025.
793	Clarissa Langdon	1937	1937–1962	Boulmer	(Note: 35 ft 6 in (10.82 m) x 10 ft 1 in (3.07 m) Liverpool-class lifeboat, legacy of Mr W. Langdon, built by J. Samuel White of Cowes, costing £3,669.) Sold March 1965. Renamed Homewards, a workboat at Foula, Shetland Islands, December 2023.
793	Clarissa Langdon	1937	1962–1963	Reserve fleet	Sold March 1965. Renamed Homewards, a workboat at Foula, Shetland Islands, December 2023.
793	Clarissa Langdon	1937	1963	Seaham	Sold March 1965. Renamed Homewards, a workboat at Foula, Shetland Islands, December 2023.
793	Clarissa Langdon	1937	1963–1965	Reserve fleet	Sold March 1965. Renamed Homewards, a workboat at Foula, Shetland Islands, December 2023.
794	Richard Silver Oliver	1937	1937–1939	Cullercoats	(Note: 35 ft 6 in (10.82 m) x 10 ft 3 in (3.12 m) Liverpool-class lifeboat, legacy of Mrs Oliver, built by J. Samuel White of Cowes, costing £3,684.) Capsized on exercise at Cullercoats with the loss of 6 lives, 22 April 1939. Sold 1963, to the Chilean Lifeboat Service, renamed Valparaiso II and stationed at Lirquén, Chile. See below.
794	Richard Silver Oliver	1937	1940–1945	Newquay	Capsized on exercise at Cullercoats with the loss of 6 lives, 22 April 1939. Sold 1963, to the Chilean Lifeboat Service, renamed Valparaiso II and stationed at Lirquén, Chile. See below.
794	Richard Silver Oliver	1937	1945–1952	Ilfracombe	Capsized on exercise at Cullercoats with the loss of 6 lives, 22 April 1939. Sold 1963, to the Chilean Lifeboat Service, renamed Valparaiso II and stationed at Lirquén, Chile. See below.
794	Richard Silver Oliver	1937	1953–1961	Criccieth	Capsized on exercise at Cullercoats with the loss of 6 lives, 22 April 1939. Sold 1963, to the Chilean Lifeboat Service, renamed Valparaiso II and stationed at Lirquén, Chile. See below.
794	Richard Silver Oliver	1937	1961–1963	Reserve fleet	Capsized on exercise at Cullercoats with the loss of 6 lives, 22 April 1939. Sold 1963, to the Chilean Lifeboat Service, renamed Valparaiso II and stationed at Lirquén, Chile. See below.
795	Frank and William Oates	1937	1937–1951	Eyemouth	(Note: 35 ft 6 in (10.82 m) x 10 ft 3 in (3.12 m) Liverpool-class lifeboat, legacy of Mr Oates, built by Groves and Guttridge of Cowes, costing £3,835.) Sold 1964. Renamed Seren-Y-Mor, fishing / trip boat at Tenby, September 2025.
795	Frank and William Oates	1937	1952–1955	Girvan	Sold 1964. Renamed Seren-Y-Mor, fishing / trip boat at Tenby, September 2025.
795	Frank and William Oates	1937	1956–1963	Reserve fleet	Sold 1964. Renamed Seren-Y-Mor, fishing / trip boat at Tenby, September 2025.
795	Frank and William Oates	1937	1963–1964	Hastings	Sold 1964. Renamed Seren-Y-Mor, fishing / trip boat at Tenby, September 2025.
796	Herbert John	1937	–	(Cloughey)	(Note: 35 ft 6 in (10.82 m) x 10 ft 3 in (3.12 m) Liverpool-class lifeboat, built by Groves and Guttridge of Cowes, costing £3,838.) Destroyed by fire at the builder's yard, 18 June 1937.
797	Howard D	1937	1937–1948	St Helier	(Note: 35 ft 6 in (10.82 m) x 10 ft 3 in (3.12 m) Liverpool-class lifeboat, gift of Mr T. B. Davies, built by Saunders-Roe of Cowes, costing £3,623.) Under German control at St Helier 1940–1945. Sold 1964. Floating display, at Jersey Maritime Museum, July 2025.
797	Howard D	1937	1948–1953	Flamborough	Under German control at St Helier 1940–1945. Sold 1964. Floating display, at Jersey Maritime Museum, July 2025.
797	Howard D	1937	1953–1956	Arbroath	Under German control at St Helier 1940–1945. Sold 1964. Floating display, at Jersey Maritime Museum, July 2025.
797	Howard D	1937	1956–1962	Reserve fleet	Under German control at St Helier 1940–1945. Sold 1964. Floating display, at Jersey Maritime Museum, July 2025.
797	Howard D	1937	1962–1963	Seaham	Under German control at St Helier 1940–1945. Sold 1964. Floating display, at Jersey Maritime Museum, July 2025.
797	Howard D	1937	1963–1964	Reserve fleet	Under German control at St Helier 1940–1945. Sold 1964. Floating display, at Jersey Maritime Museum, July 2025.
798	Ann Isabella Pyemont	1937	1937–1965	Kilmore Quay	(Note: 35 ft 6 in (10.82 m) x 10 ft 3 in (3.12 m) Liverpool-class lifeboat, gift of Mr J. Pyemont, built by Groves and Guttridge of Cowes, costing £3,908.) Sold 1966. Renamed Ann Isabella LO 61, modified (shortened stern) fishing boat, at Blakeney, Norfolk, December 2025.
799	Helen Sutton	1937	1937–1952	Peel	(Note: 35 ft 6 in (10.82 m) x 10 ft 3 in (3.12 m) Liverpool-class lifeboat, funded via the executors of the late Mrs Sutton, built by Saunders-Roe of Cowes, costing £3,637.) Sold 1958 to Guatemala Lifeboat Service, taking up service in 1959. See below.
799	Helen Sutton	1937	1952–1958	Reserve fleet	Sold 1958 to Guatemala Lifeboat Service, taking up service in 1959. See below.
800	Sarah Ann Austin	1937	1937–1961	Blackpool	(Note: 35 ft 6 in (10.82 m) x 10 ft 3 in (3.12 m) Liverpool-class lifeboat, legacy of Mrs S. A. Walker and gift of the governors of the charity Skelton Bounty, built by Groves and Guttridge of Cowes, costing £3,896.) Sold August 1965. As Sarah Ann Austin on River Deben at Woodbridge, Suffolk, October 2023.
800	Sarah Ann Austin	1937	1962–1965	Reserve fleet	Sold August 1965. As Sarah Ann Austin on River Deben at Woodbridge, Suffolk, October 2023.
825	Herbert John	1939	1939–1952	Cloughey	(Note: 35 ft 6 in (10.82 m) x 10 ft 3 in (3.12 m) Liverpool-class lifeboat, legacy of Mrs S. A. Walker and gift of the governors of the charity Skelton Bounty, built by Groves and Guttridge of Cowes, costing £4,054.) Sold 1966. Renamed Sea Drift, Paua, and Alexis. Restored to original condition as Herbert John at Southwold, June 2024.
825	Herbert John	1939	1952–1966	Youghal	Sold 1966. Renamed Sea Drift, Paua, and Alexis. Restored to original condition as Herbert John at Southwold, June 2024.
827	George and Elizabeth Gow	1939	1939–1943	Aberdeen No.2	(Note: 35 ft 6 in (10.82 m) x 10 ft 3 in (3.12 m) Liverpool-class lifeboat, legacy of Mrs E. L. Gow, built by Morgan Giles of Teignmouth, costing £4,709.) Sold 1965. Renamed Clan Mackenzie, later The Gow. Now restored to original condition as George and Elizabeth Gow on the Yonne (river) at Migennes, France, December 2024.
827	George and Elizabeth Gow	1939	1943–1946	RAF, Azores	Sold 1965. Renamed Clan Mackenzie, later The Gow. Now restored to original condition as George and Elizabeth Gow on the Yonne (river) at Migennes, France, December 2024.
827	George and Elizabeth Gow	1939	1947–1962	Aberdeen No.2	Sold 1965. Renamed Clan Mackenzie, later The Gow. Now restored to original condition as George and Elizabeth Gow on the Yonne (river) at Migennes, France, December 2024.
827	George and Elizabeth Gow	1939	1962–1964	Reserve fleet	Sold 1965. Renamed Clan Mackenzie, later The Gow. Now restored to original condition as George and Elizabeth Gow on the Yonne (river) at Migennes, France, December 2024.
831	Caroline Oates Aver and William Maine	1939	1940–1948	St Ives	(Note: 35 ft 6 in (10.82 m) x 10 ft 3 in (3.12 m) Liverpool-class lifeboat, legacies of Mrs Aver and Miss Maine, built by Groves and Guttridge of Cowes, costing £4,290.) Sold July 1960. Last reported as fishing boat Caroline and William at Barmouth, 1969.
831	Caroline Oates Aver and William Maine	1939	1948–1960	Ferryside	Sold July 1960. Last reported as fishing boat Caroline and William at Barmouth, 1969.
832	Lucy Lavers	1939	1940–1959	Aldeburgh No.2	(Note: 35 ft 6 in (10.82 m) x 10 ft 3 in (3.12 m) Liverpool-class lifeboat, legacy of Mr Laver and the estate of Mr E. J. Williams, built by Groves and Guttridge of Cowes, costing £4,455. Re-engined with twin 47-hp Parsons Porbeagle 4-cyl. diesel engines, 1963.) This lifeboat was one of the Little Ships of the Dunkirk evacuation in 1940. Sold 1968. Fully restored tour boat at Wells-next-the-Sea, Norfolk, December 2025.
832	Lucy Lavers	1939	1959–1964	Reserve fleet	This lifeboat was one of the Little Ships of the Dunkirk evacuation in 1940. Sold 1968. Fully restored tour boat at Wells-next-the-Sea, Norfolk, December 2025.
832	Lucy Lavers	1939	1964	Hastings	This lifeboat was one of the Little Ships of the Dunkirk evacuation in 1940. Sold 1968. Fully restored tour boat at Wells-next-the-Sea, Norfolk, December 2025.
832	Lucy Lavers	1939	1964–1968	Reserve fleet	This lifeboat was one of the Little Ships of the Dunkirk evacuation in 1940. Sold 1968. Fully restored tour boat at Wells-next-the-Sea, Norfolk, December 2025.
833	The Cuttle	1940	1940–1953	Filey	(Note: 35 ft 6 in (10.82 m) x 10 ft 3 in (3.12 m) Liverpool-class lifeboat, legacy of Miss L. F. Cuttle, built by Groves and Guttridge of Cowes, costing £4,444.) Sold August 1966. Lost off the Île d'Oléron, France, 6 October 1967.
833	The Cuttle	1940	1953–1964	Skegness	Sold August 1966. Lost off the Île d'Oléron, France, 6 October 1967.
833	The Cuttle	1940	1964–1966	Reserve fleet	Sold August 1966. Lost off the Île d'Oléron, France, 6 October 1967.
834	Jose Neville	1941	1941–1964	Caister	(Note: 35 ft 6 in (10.82 m) x 10 ft 3 in (3.12 m) Liverpool-class lifeboat, legacy of Miss E. Neville, built by Groves and Guttridge of Cowes, costing £4,474.) Sold August 1966. Renamed Concorde LT 267, fishing vessel at Southwold, Renamed Valas by 2001, at Slaughden Quay, Aldeburgh, July 2024.
834	Jose Neville	1941	1964–1966	Reserve fleet	Sold August 1966. Renamed Concorde LT 267, fishing vessel at Southwold, Renamed Valas by 2001, at Slaughden Quay, Aldeburgh, July 2024.

=== Twin engine ===
All twin-engined Liverpool-class lifeboat were 35 ft 6 in (10.82 m) x 10 ft 8 in (3.25 m)

ON (Note: ON is the RNLI's Official Number of the boat.)	Name	Built	In service	Station	Comments
839	W. and B.	1940	–	–	Prototype twin-engine Liverpool-class lifeboat, built by Groves and Guttridge of Cowes, with twin 18-hp Weyburn AE4 4-cyl. petrol engines, destroyed in an air raid at builders yard, 4 May 1942
850	Cecil Paine	1945	1945–1965	Wells-next-the-Sea	(Note: Liverpool-class lifeboat, legacy of Mr A. C. Paine, built by Groves and Guttridge of Cowes, with twin 18-hp Weyburn AE4 4-cyl. petrol engines, costing £7,462. Re-engined with twin 32-hp Perkins 4.107 4-cyl. diesel engines, 1964.) Sold 1973. Renamed Patreo-Joao-Rangel. Last reported as a retired lifeboat at Sesimbra, Setepal, Portugal, April 2000
850	Cecil Paine	1945	1965–1972	Kilmore Quay	Sold 1973. Renamed Patreo-Joao-Rangel. Last reported as a retired lifeboat at Sesimbra, Setepal, Portugal, April 2000
850	Cecil Paine	1945	1972–1973	Relief fleet	Sold 1973. Renamed Patreo-Joao-Rangel. Last reported as a retired lifeboat at Sesimbra, Setepal, Portugal, April 2000
861	Edgar, George, Orlando and Eva Child	1948	1948–1968	St Ives	(Note: Liverpool-class lifeboat, legacies of Mr Pol, Mr Child, Maj. Wilson and Miss Cockroft, built by Groves and Guttridge of Cowes, with twin 18-hp Weyburn AE4 4-cyl. petrol engines, costing £9,752. Re-engined with twin 32-hp Perkins 4.107 4-cyl. diesel engines, 1965.) Sold 1983. Renamed Eileena Anne. In storage as Edgar, George, Orlando and Eva Child at Stiffkey, Norfolk, December 2025.
861	Edgar, George, Orlando and Eva Child	1948	1968–1970	Reserve fleet	Sold 1983. Renamed Eileena Anne. In storage as Edgar, George, Orlando and Eva Child at Stiffkey, Norfolk, December 2025.
861	Edgar, George, Orlando and Eva Child	1948	1970–1975	Blackpool	Sold 1983. Renamed Eileena Anne. In storage as Edgar, George, Orlando and Eva Child at Stiffkey, Norfolk, December 2025.
861	Edgar, George, Orlando and Eva Child	1948	1975–1982	Relief fleet	Sold 1983. Renamed Eileena Anne. In storage as Edgar, George, Orlando and Eva Child at Stiffkey, Norfolk, December 2025.
862	Thomas Corbett	1948	1948–1970	Ramsey	(Note: Liverpool-class lifeboat, gift of the Thomas Corbett Charity, built by Groves and Guttridge of Cowes, with twin 18-hp Weyburn AE4 4-cyl. petrol engines, costing £9,581. Re-engined with twin 32-hp Perkins 4.107 4-cyl. diesel engines, 1964.) Sold 1981. Used by Venture Scouts at Crosshaven, Ireland. By 2003, at Birkenhead for restoration for display at Hoylake but sold in 2014. In storage at Stiffkey, Norfolk, December 2025.
862	Thomas Corbett	1948	1970–1974	Hoylake	Sold 1981. Used by Venture Scouts at Crosshaven, Ireland. By 2003, at Birkenhead for restoration for display at Hoylake but sold in 2014. In storage at Stiffkey, Norfolk, December 2025.
862	Thomas Corbett	1948	1974–1981	Clogherhead	Sold 1981. Used by Venture Scouts at Crosshaven, Ireland. By 2003, at Birkenhead for restoration for display at Hoylake but sold in 2014. In storage at Stiffkey, Norfolk, December 2025.
863	St. Albans	1948	1948–1970	New Quay	(Note: Liverpool-class lifeboat, gift of the St Albans LB fund, built by Groves and Guttridge of Cowes, with twin 18-hp Weyburn AE4 4-cyl. petrol engines, costing £9,836. Re-engined with twin 32-hp Perkins 4.107 4-cyl. diesel engines, 1964.) Sold December 1970. Renamed Roadstone Pilot, later Lorraine. Broken up at Arklow, March 2005.
864	The Chieftain	1948	1949–1982	Barmouth	(Note: Liverpool-class lifeboat, legacy of Mr P. C. Peek, built by Groves and Guttridge of Cowes, with twin 18-hp Weyburn AE4 4-cyl. petrol engines, costing £9,943. Re-engined with twin 32-hp Perkins 4.107 4-cyl. diesel engines, 1964.) Sold April 1982. Restored to original condition by 2010, currently a working tour boat (summer) in Whitstable, December 2025.
869	Anthony Robert Marshall	1949	1949–1968	Rhyl	(Note: Liverpool-class lifeboat, legacy of Mr A. R. Marshall, built by Groves and Guttridge of Cowes, with twin 20-hp Ferry Kadency FKR3 3-cyl. diesel engines, costing £11,763. Re-engined with twin 32-hp Perkins 4.107 4-cyl. diesel engines, 1965.) Sold 1980. Renamed Ellen B (YH 126). In storage for restoration as Anthony Robert Marshall at Stiffkey, Norfolk, December 2025.
869	Anthony Robert Marshall	1949	1968–1972	Reserve fleet	Sold 1980. Renamed Ellen B (YH 126). In storage for restoration as Anthony Robert Marshall at Stiffkey, Norfolk, December 2025.
869	Anthony Robert Marshall	1949	1972–1979	Pwllheli	Sold 1980. Renamed Ellen B (YH 126). In storage for restoration as Anthony Robert Marshall at Stiffkey, Norfolk, December 2025.
869	Anthony Robert Marshall	1949	1979–1980	Relief fleet	Sold 1980. Renamed Ellen B (YH 126). In storage for restoration as Anthony Robert Marshall at Stiffkey, Norfolk, December 2025.
870	William and Laura	1949	1949–1980	Newcastle	(Note: Liverpool-class lifeboat, legacy of Miss A. W. Clarke-Hall, built by Groves and Guttridge of Cowes, with twin 18-hp Weyburn AE4 4-cyl. petrol engines, costing £10,844. Re-engined with twin 32-hp Perkins 4.107 4-cyl. diesel engines, 1965.) Sold September 1980. Preserved since 1980 at Ulster Folk and Transport Museums, December 2025.
871	William Cantrell Ashley	1949	1949–1968	Clovelly	(Note: Liverpool-class lifeboat, legacy of Mr C. C. Ashley of Menton, France, built by Groves and Guttridge of Cowes, with twin 18-hp Weyburn AE4 4-cyl. petrol engines, costing £10,964. Re-engined with twin 32-hp Perkins 4.107 4-cyl. diesel engines, 1964.) Sold 1968. Renamed St Cedd. Restored in Scarborough, operated as a trip boat in multiple locations. Since 2021, in private ownership as William Cantrell Ashley at Penarth Marina, September 2025.
872	J. B. Couper of Glasgow	1949	1949–1953	St Abbs	(Note: Liverpool-class lifeboat, legacy of Mr Couper, built by Groves and Guttridge of Cowes, with twin 18-hp Weyburn AE4 4-cyl. petrol engines, costing £10,899. Re-engined with twin 32-hp Perkins 4.107 4-cyl. diesel engines, 1965.) Sold February 1976. Renamed Etoile Du Nord (GU5045). Since 2019, on display at the Peninsular Hotel, Vale, Guernsey, December 2025.
872	J. B. Couper of Glasgow	1949	1953–1965	Kirkcudbright	Sold February 1976. Renamed Etoile Du Nord (GU5045). Since 2019, on display at the Peninsular Hotel, Vale, Guernsey, December 2025.
872	J. B. Couper of Glasgow	1949	1966–1971	Youghal	Sold February 1976. Renamed Etoile Du Nord (GU5045). Since 2019, on display at the Peninsular Hotel, Vale, Guernsey, December 2025.
872	J. B. Couper of Glasgow	1949	1971	Reserve fleet	Sold February 1976. Renamed Etoile Du Nord (GU5045). Since 2019, on display at the Peninsular Hotel, Vale, Guernsey, December 2025.
872	J. B. Couper of Glasgow	1949	1971–1974	Poole	Sold February 1976. Renamed Etoile Du Nord (GU5045). Since 2019, on display at the Peninsular Hotel, Vale, Guernsey, December 2025.
872	J. B. Couper of Glasgow	1949	1974–1975	Relief fleet	Sold February 1976. Renamed Etoile Du Nord (GU5045). Since 2019, on display at the Peninsular Hotel, Vale, Guernsey, December 2025.
873	George Elmy	1950	1950–1962	Seaham	(Note: Liverpool-class lifeboat, legacy of Miss Elmy, built by Groves and Guttridge of Cowes, with twin 18-hp Weyburn AE4 4-cyl. petrol engines, costing £10,983. Re-engined with twin 32-hp Perkins 4.107 4-cyl. diesel engines, 1963.) Capsized on service at Seaham with nine lives lost, 17 November 1962. Sold September 1972. Restored to original condition, on display since July 2013 at East Durham Heritage and Lifeboat Centre, Seaham, December 2025.
873	George Elmy	1950	1963–1969	Reserve fleet	Capsized on service at Seaham with nine lives lost, 17 November 1962. Sold September 1972. Restored to original condition, on display since July 2013 at East Durham Heritage and Lifeboat Centre, Seaham, December 2025.
873	George Elmy	1950	1969–1971	Poole	Capsized on service at Seaham with nine lives lost, 17 November 1962. Sold September 1972. Restored to original condition, on display since July 2013 at East Durham Heritage and Lifeboat Centre, Seaham, December 2025.
874	Robert Lindsay	1950	1950–1953	Arbroath	(Note: Liverpool-class lifeboat, legacy of Mr Lindsay Jr., built by Groves and Guttridge of Cowes, with twin 20-hp Ferry Kadency FKR3 3-cyl. diesel engines, costing £11,857.) Capsized on service at Arbroath with six lives lost, 27 October 1953. Sold 1968. Under restoration since December 2022, at Stiffkey, Norfolk, December 2025.
874	Robert Lindsay	1950	1953–1955	Reserve fleet	Capsized on service at Arbroath with six lives lost, 27 October 1953. Sold 1968. Under restoration since December 2022, at Stiffkey, Norfolk, December 2025.
874	Robert Lindsay	1950	1955–1960	Girvan	Capsized on service at Arbroath with six lives lost, 27 October 1953. Sold 1968. Under restoration since December 2022, at Stiffkey, Norfolk, December 2025.
874	Robert Lindsay	1950	1960–1961	Reserve fleet	Capsized on service at Arbroath with six lives lost, 27 October 1953. Sold 1968. Under restoration since December 2022, at Stiffkey, Norfolk, December 2025.
874	Robert Lindsay	1950	1961–1968	Criccieth	Capsized on service at Arbroath with six lives lost, 27 October 1953. Sold 1968. Under restoration since December 2022, at Stiffkey, Norfolk, December 2025.
875	Richard Ashley	1950	1950–1966	Newbiggin	(Note: Liverpool-class lifeboat, legacy of Mr C. C. Ashley of Menton, France, built by Groves and Guttridge of Cowes, with twin 20-hp Ferry Kadency FKR3 3-cyl. diesel engines, costing £13,154.) Sold 1967. Renamed Kirstey of Luing. Last reported as a yacht at Cushendall, Northern Ireland, 1980 (possibly lost at Dún Laoghaire)?.
876	James and Ruby Jackson	1950	1950–1965	Anstruther	(Note: Liverpool-class lifeboat, legacy of Mr Jackson, built by Groves and Guttridge of Cowes, with twin 20-hp Ferry Kadency FKR3 3-cyl. diesel engines, costing £13,231.) Sold 1969. Renamed Galore (B 42). Lost at Dún Laoghaire, 1998.
876	James and Ruby Jackson	1950	1965–1967	Reserve fleet	Sold 1969. Renamed Galore (B 42). Lost at Dún Laoghaire, 1998.
877	George and Caroline Ermen	1950	1950–1974	Clogherhead	(Note: Liverpool-class lifeboat, legacy of Mr Ermen, by J. Samuel White of Cowes, with twin 20-hp Ferry Kadency FKR3 3-cyl. diesel engines, costing £14,596.) Sold July 1974. Renamed Boreas. By 2009 it was a derelict hull at Camuscross on the Isle of Skye.
882	B. H. M. H.	1951	1951–1973	Minehead	(Note: Liverpool-class lifeboat, legacies of Mr Bailey and Mrs Hall, a gift from Mr Heys, plus an anonymous gift, built by Rowhedge Ironworks of Rowhedge, Essex, with twin 18-hp Weyburn AE4 4-cyl. petrol engines, costing £13,913. Re-engined with twin 32-hp Perkins 4.107 4-cyl. diesel engines, 1964.) Sold 1985. Renamed Kingfisher, Jense and Queen Eileen, at Tarbert (2004), later Windsor (2006), removed for restoration c.2011, completed 2019, last reported at Chiswick, River Thames, September 2020.
882	B. H. M. H.	1951	1973–1981	Relief fleet	Sold 1985. Renamed Kingfisher, Jense and Queen Eileen, at Tarbert (2004), later Windsor (2006), removed for restoration c.2011, completed 2019, last reported at Chiswick, River Thames, September 2020.
882	B. H. M. H.	1951	1981–1984	Clogherhead	Sold 1985. Renamed Kingfisher, Jense and Queen Eileen, at Tarbert (2004), later Windsor (2006), removed for restoration c.2011, completed 2019, last reported at Chiswick, River Thames, September 2020.
891	Bassett-Green	1951	1951–1962	Padstow No.2	(Note: Liverpool-class lifeboat, gift of Mr Bassett-Green, built by Groves and Guttridge of Cowes, with twin 20-hp Ferry Kadency FKR3 3-cyl. diesel engines, costing £14,038.) Sold 1969. Renamed RYV and Aqua Nomad. In private ownership as Bassett-Green at Campbeltown, Scotland, June 2024.
891	Bassett-Green	1951	1962–1969	Poole	Sold 1969. Renamed RYV and Aqua Nomad. In private ownership as Bassett-Green at Campbeltown, Scotland, June 2024.
892	Aguila Wren	1951	1951–1964	Aberystwyth	(Note: Liverpool-class lifeboat, gift of the Aguila Wren Memorial Fund, plus the legacy of Mr Moorhouse, built by Groves and Guttridge of Cowes, with twin 20-hp Ferry Kadency FKR3 3-cyl. diesel engines, costing £14,038.) Sold December 1972. Under restoration at Donaghadee, Northern Ireland, December 2025.
892	Aguila Wren	1951	1965–1972	Redcar	Sold December 1972. Under restoration at Donaghadee, Northern Ireland, December 2025.
893	Clara and Emily Barwell	1951	1951–1963	Eyemouth	(Note: Liverpool-class lifeboat, legacies of the Misses C. and E. Barwell, built by Groves and Guttridge of Cowes, with twin 20-hp Ferry Kadency FKR3 3-cyl. diesel engines, costing £14,008.) Sold February 1969. Wheelhouse added for use as a fishing boat Ellie Lou (LT 546), Lowestoft, July 2024.
893	Clara and Emily Barwell	1951	1963–1968	Reserve fleet	Sold February 1969. Wheelhouse added for use as a fishing boat Ellie Lou (LT 546), Lowestoft, July 2024.
894	Oldham IV	1952	1952–1970	Hoylake	(Note: Liverpool-class lifeboat, from RNLI funds, built by Groves and Guttridge of Cowes, with twin 20-hp Ferry Kadency FKR3 3-cyl. diesel engines, costing £14,162.) Sold October 1970. Location unknown.
895	Edith Clauson-Thue	1952	1952–1969	Gourdon	(Note: Liverpool-class lifeboat, legacies of Miss Edith Clauson-Thue, of Bournemouth, Miss Victoria Anderson, of Edinburgh, and Sir Robert Lockhart, of Kirkcaldy, built by (Unknown), with twin 20-hp Ferry Kadency FKR3 3-cyl. diesel engines, costing £14,436.) Sold 1969. Renamed Rambler (SO 299). Last reported as a fishing boat at Courtown, Ireland, October 2002.
902	Constance Calverley	1952	1952–1965	Cloughey	(Note: Liverpool-class lifeboat, legacy of Miss Calverley, built by Groves and Guttridge of Cowes, with twin 20-hp Ferry Kadency FKR3 3-cyl. diesel engines, costing £14,337.) Sold 1970. Renamed Sea Rover. Fishing boat with a wheelhouse added. Sunk at Youghal, Ireland, October 2002.
902	Constance Calverley	1952	1965–1970	Reserve fleet	Sold 1970. Renamed Sea Rover. Fishing boat with a wheelhouse added. Sunk at Youghal, Ireland, October 2002.
903	Helen Harris - Manchester & District XXXI	1952	1952–1972	Peel	(Note: Liverpool-class lifeboat, legacy of Miss Harris, built by Groves and Guttridge of Cowes, with twin 20-hp Ferry Kadency FKR3 3-cyl. diesel engines, costing £13,764.) Sold 1972. Stored for restoration since 2019 at Yonne (river), Migennes, France, December 2024.
904	Robert and Phemia Brown	1952	1952–1966	Ilfracombe	(Note: Liverpool-class lifeboat, legacy of Capt. Brown, built by Groves and Guttridge of Cowes, with twin 20-hp Ferry Kadency FKR3 3-cyl. diesel engines, costing £14,200.) Sold 1967. Last reported at Weymouth, Dorset, 1971.
905	Katherine and Virgoe Buckland	1952	1953–1972	Pwllheli	(Note: Liverpool-class lifeboat, legacies of Cmdr. Buckland and Mr Woodhead, and gift of the British Services Charity, built by Groves and Guttridge of Cowes, with twin 20-hp Ferry Kadency FKR3 3-cyl. diesel engines, costing £14,395.) Sold 1972. Renamed Lord Hurcomb, later James Noel. Wheelhouse added, trip boat, Tenby, September 2025.
906	W. Ross MacArthur of Glasgow	1953	1953–1964	St Abbs	(Note: Liverpool-class lifeboat, legacy of Mr Ross MacArthur, built by Groves and Guttridge of Cowes, with twin 20-hp Ferry Kadency FKR3 3-cyl. diesel engines, costing £14,398.) Sold February 1969. Renamed Viking of Wells. Returned to service with Caister Lifeboat as Shirley Jean Ayde (1973–1991). See below.
906	W. Ross MacArthur of Glasgow	1953	1964–1968	Reserve fleet	Sold February 1969. Renamed Viking of Wells. Returned to service with Caister Lifeboat as Shirley Jean Ayde (1973–1991). See below.
914	Tillie Morrison, Sheffield II	1953	1953–1967	Bridlington	(Note: Liverpool-class lifeboat, legacy of Mr Whitaker, plus RNLI funds, built by Groves and Guttridge of Cowes, with twin 20-hp Ferry Kadency FKR3 3-cyl. diesel engines, costing £14,482.) Sold 1969. Renamed Rescue III for service with the Sumner Lifeboat Society, New Zealand. See below.
914	Tillie Morrison, Sheffield II	1953	1967–1968	Reserve fleet	Sold 1969. Renamed Rescue III for service with the Sumner Lifeboat Society, New Zealand. See below.
915	Friendly Forester	1953	1953–1983	Flamborough	(Note: Liverpool-class lifeboat, gift of the Ancient Order of Foresters, built by Groves and Guttridge of Cowes, with twin 20-hp Ferry Kadency FKR3 3-cyl. diesel engines, costing £15,738. Re-engined with twin 32-hp Perkins 4.107 4-cyl. diesel engines, 1969.) Sold 1984. Displayed at Blackgang Chine amusement park on the Isle of Wight. Sold 2017, on display at Thornwick Bay Holiday Village, Flamborough, Yorkshire, December 2025.
916	Maria Noble	1953	1953–1960	Exmouth	(Note: Liverpool-class lifeboat, legacies of Mr Noble, Mr West, Mrs Andrews and Mr Williams, built by Groves and Guttridge of Cowes, with twin 20-hp Ferry Kadency FKR3 3-cyl. diesel engines, costing £14,594.) Sold 1975. Last reported under restoration, possibly as Jack Sam, as a youth training boat in Limerick, July 2015.
916	Maria Noble	1953	1960–1961	Reserve fleet	Sold 1975. Last reported under restoration, possibly as Jack Sam, as a youth training boat in Limerick, July 2015.
916	Maria Noble	1953	1961–1970	Blackpool	Sold 1975. Last reported under restoration, possibly as Jack Sam, as a youth training boat in Limerick, July 2015.
916	Maria Noble	1953	1970–1973	Reserve fleet	Sold 1975. Last reported under restoration, possibly as Jack Sam, as a youth training boat in Limerick, July 2015.
917	The Isa and Penryn Milsted	1953	1953–1968	Filey	(Note: Liverpool-class lifeboat, legacy of Mr Milsted, built by Groves and Guttridge of Cowes, with twin 20-hp Ferry Kadency FKR3 3-cyl. diesel engines, costing £14,881.) Sold 1968. Renamed Achievable (YH15), a fishing boat with added wheelhouse, at Great Yarmouth, December 2023.
918	The Elliott Gill	1953	1954–1970	Runswick	(Note: Liverpool-class lifeboat, legacy of Miss Gill, built by Groves and Guttridge of Cowes, with twin 20-hp Ferry Kadency FKR3 3-cyl. diesel engines, costing £15,254.) Sold August 1974. Renamed Gill of London, Santana, and Wendy and Barbara, used as a fishing boat. Fully restored as The Elliott Gill, based at Watchet, Somerset, July 2025.
918	The Elliott Gill	1953	1970–1974	Reserve fleet	Sold August 1974. Renamed Gill of London, Santana, and Wendy and Barbara, used as a fishing boat. Fully restored as The Elliott Gill, based at Watchet, Somerset, July 2025.
927	Grace Darling	1954	1954–1967	North Sunderland	(Note: Liverpool-class lifeboat, from RNLI funds, built by Groves and Guttridge of Cowes, with twin 20-hp Ferry Kadency FKR3 3-cyl. diesel engines, costing £15,040. Re-engined with twin 32-hp Perkins 4.107 4-cyl. diesel engines, 1971.) Sold in 1985. Initially on display at the Bristol Lifeboat Museum. On display since April 1996 in the RNLI Heritage Collection at Chatham Historic Dockyard, December 2025.
927	Grace Darling	1954	1967–1971	Reserve fleet	Sold in 1985. Initially on display at the Bristol Lifeboat Museum. On display since April 1996 in the RNLI Heritage Collection at Chatham Historic Dockyard, December 2025.
927	Grace Darling	1954	1971–1984	Youghal	Sold in 1985. Initially on display at the Bristol Lifeboat Museum. On display since April 1996 in the RNLI Heritage Collection at Chatham Historic Dockyard, December 2025.

== Other fleets ==
RNLI ON (Note: ON is the RNLI's Official Number of the boat.)	Name	Built	In service	Station	Comments
781	W.R.A. (Guatemala Lifeboat Service)	1935	1959–????	Guatemala	
794	Valparaiso II (Chilean Lifeboat Service)	1937	1963–1978	Lirquén	Damaged in service but then destroyed by vandals while awaiting repairs in 1978.
799	Helen Sutton (Guatemala Lifeboat Service)	1937	1959–????	Guatemala	
906	Shirley Jean Ayde (Caister Lifeboat)	1953	1973–1991	Caister	Sold to Pembroke Dock Authority in 1992 and renamed Mariners Friend. Sold into private ownership in 1994. By 2006, had returned to Caister Lifeboat, now on display as Shirley Jean Ayde at the Old Lifeboat House Museum, Caister-on-Sea, Norfolk, December 2025.
914	Rescue III (Sumner Lifeboat Society)	1953	1970–1992	Sumner; New Zealand	Sold c.1992. Unaltered condition, trip boat at New Plymouth, New Zealand, December 2025.

== See also ==
- Royal National Lifeboat Institution lifeboats
