= Gourdon Lifeboat Station =

Former RNLI lifeboat station in Aberdeenshire, Scotland

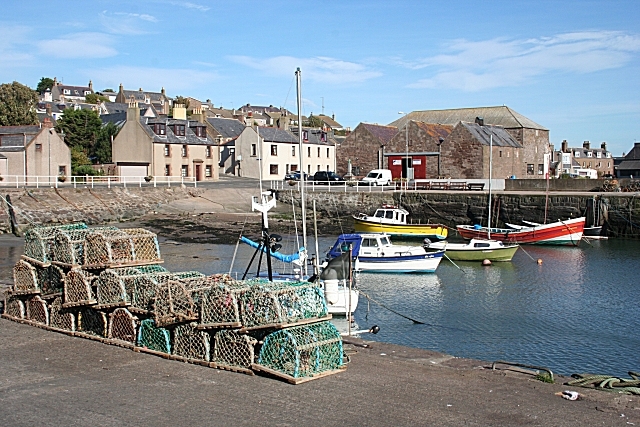
- Gourdon Harbour

- Gourdon, Aberdeenshire

General information
- Status: Closed
- Location: The Old Lifeboat House, William Street, Gourdon, Aberdeenshire, DD10 0LP, Scotland
- Coordinates: 56°49′40.8″N 2°17′05.0″W
- Opened: 1878
- Closed: 1969

Gourdon Lifeboat Station was located on William Street in Gourdon, a fishing village approximately 27 miles (43 km) south-west of Aberdeen, in the county of Aberdeenshire, historically Kincardineshire, on the east coast of Scotland.

A lifeboat was first placed at Gourdon in 1878, by the Royal National Lifeboat Institution (RNLI). An Independent lifeboat, Maggie Law, also operated between 1890 and 1938.

After 91 years of service, Gourdon Lifeboat Station was closed in 1969.

== History ==
On invitation of local residents, and following the visit and report of the Inspector of Lifeboats, at a meeting of the RNLI committee of management on Thursday 3 May 1877, it was decided to establish a lifeboat station at Gourdon, Kincardineshire. "Shipwrecks are said to be increasing in that neighbourhood. It is also stated that the Boat will probably often be instrumental in aiding fishing-boats belonging to Gourdon, Bervie, and Johnshaven, on their being overtaken by sudden gales of wind while out pursuing their avocations, there being no other Life-boat nearer than Montrose on the south, and Stonehaven on the north, Gourdon being about midway between those places."

The cost of the lifeboat and station had been defrayed from the legacy of the late George Irlam of London. A new boathouse was constructed on land granted by James Farquhar of Hallgreen, and a new 33-foot self-righting 'Pulling and Sailing' (P&S) lifeboat, one with sails and (10) oars, was sent to the town, along with its transporting and launching carriage. On a fine day on 12 October 1878, deemed a local public holiday for the event, the lifeboat was drawn in a grand procession to Bervie, headed by the band of the Forfar and Kincardine Militia, along with the Provost, Magistrates and Town Councillors, lodges of Freemasons, Good Templars and Odd Fellows, the coastguard and volunteer rocket brigade, and the 2nd and 4th Kincardine Artillery Volunteers.

Arriving back in Gourdon, Rev J. Brown, Honorary Secretary of the Gourdon lifeboat committee, gave prayer. The lifeboat was then named Young George Irlam (ON 260), as requested by the donor, before being launched for a demonstration to the watching crowd.

The Young George Irlam served Gourdon until 1892. Not many service records can be found, and those that exist primarily show that the lifeboat was called to stand by in bad weather, while the fishing fleet returned.

In 1892, Gourdon, along with Nairn and Morte Bay, would receive one of three lifeboats funded from the legacy of the late Rev. Theophilus Sidney Echalaz of Surbiton, Surrey. In unique circumstances for the RNLI, which still causes confusion to this day, all three lifeboats were given the same name.

In 1936, after 58 years of operations, 55 launches, and 11 lives saved, Gourdon would finally get a motor-powered lifeboat, and their 'Pulling and Sailing' lifeboat Moss (ON 645) was retired. With the town and fishing fleet decorated in flags, a naming ceremony for the new Liverpool-class lifeboat was held on 23 May 1936, witnessed by a large crowd of onlookers. The lifeboat was funded from the legacy of the late Mrs. Margaret H. Dawson of Bridge of Allen, and after a service of dedication by the Rev. E. Richards, the lifeboat was duly named Margaret Dawson (ON 782).

With motor lifeboats at Aberdeen, 27 miles (43 km) to the north, and at Montrose, just 13 miles (21 km) to the south, the decision was taken to close Gourdon Lifeboat Station in 1969. The lifeboat station is now a private residence. The lifeboat on station at the time of closure, the Liverpool-class lifeboat Edith Clauson-Thue (ON 895), was sold from service in 1969, and was last recorded as the fishing boat Rambler SO 299, operating from Courtown harbour in 2002.

== Maggie Law ==
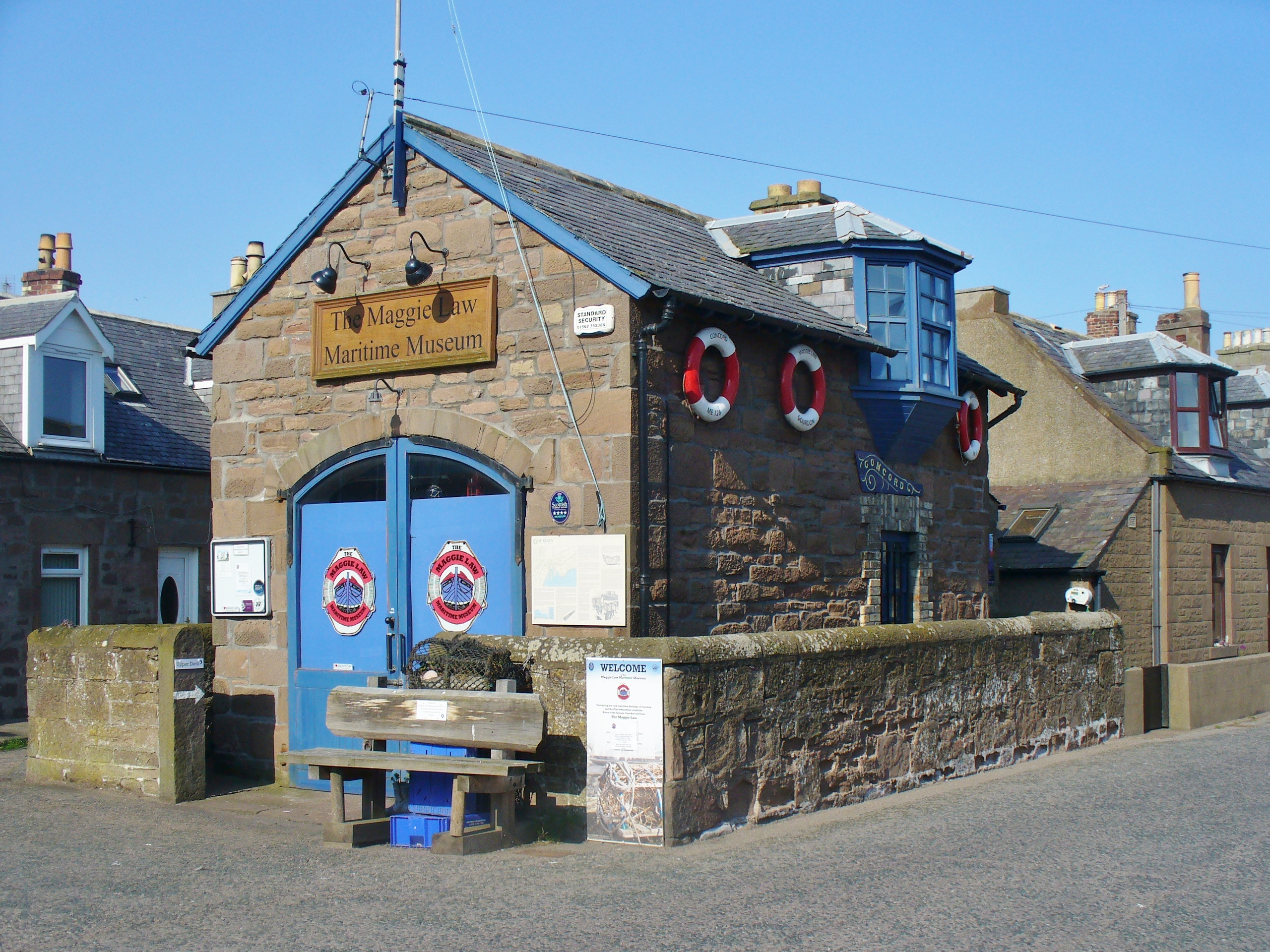
Maggie Law Maritime Museum

In 1890, a second private lifeboat began operating from Gourdon. A 30-foot 6-oared double-ended boat with a shallow draught, was constructed by local boat-builder James Mowatt, at the request of local fishermen. Designed to be able to get in amongst the rocky shores around Gourdon, she was named Maggie Law after the daughter of the local fish merchant, and funded by a penny in the pound levy on all gross earnings of local fishermen. She is regarded by some as being Scotland's first 'Inshore' lifeboat.

The Maggie Law operated from 1890 until 1938, and during that period saved 36 lives. Thought to be the last surviving boat built by James Mowatt, she is now resident in the Maggie Law Maritime Museum, a former coastguard boathouse in the centre of Gourdon village.

== Station honours ==
The following are awards made at Gourdon.

- The Thanks of the Institution inscribed on Vellum

George Milne, Coxswain – 1938

== Gourdon lifeboats ==
=== Pulling and Sailing (P&S) lifeboats ===
ON (Note: ON is the RNLI's Official Number of the boat.)	Name	Built	On station	Class	Comments
260	Young George Irlam	1878	1878–1892	33-foot Peake Self-righting (P&S)	(Note: 31-foot x 8-foot (10-oared) Peake-class self-righting (P&S) lifeboat, legacy of Mr G. Irlam of London, built by Woolde of Shadwell, London, costing £435.)
340	Theophilus Sidney Echalaz	1892	1892–1915	34-foot Self-righting (P&S)	(Note: 34-foot x 8-foot (10-oared) self-righting (P&S) lifeboat, legacy of Rev. T. S. Echalaz of Surbiton, built by Forrest of Limehouse, London, costing £427.)
645	Moss	1915	1915–1936	35-foot Rubie Self-righting (P&S)	(Note: 35-foot x 8-foot 10in (10-oared) Rubie self-righting (P&S) lifeboat, gift of Moss Empires, built by Thames Ironworks of Blackwall, London, completed by S. E. Saunders of Cowes, costing £1,500.)

=== Motor lifeboats ===
ON	Name	Built	On station	Class	Comments
782	Margaret Dawson	1936	1936–1952	Liverpool	
895	Edith Clauson-Thue	1952	1952–1969	Liverpool	

Station Closed in 1969

=== Private lifeboat ===
Name	Built	On station	Class	Comments
Maggie Law	1890	1890–1938	30-foot Non-self-righting	(Note: 30-foot (6-oared) non-self-righting lifeboat, funded from local subscription and fisherman levy, built by Jas. Mowatt of Gourdon, costing £45.)

== See also ==
- List of RNLI stations
- List of former RNLI stations
- Royal National Lifeboat Institution lifeboats
