= Filey Lifeboat Station =

RNLI Lifeboat station in North Yorkshire, England

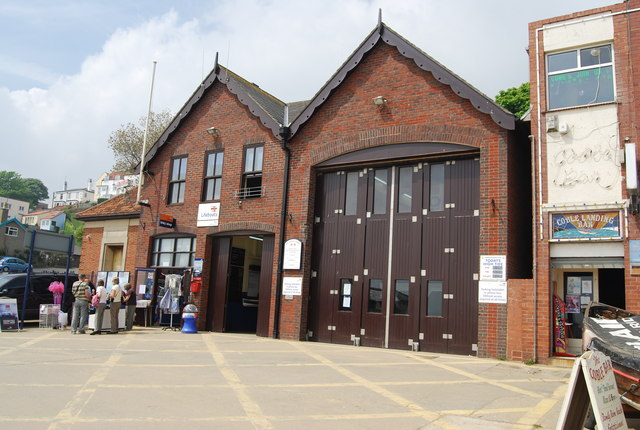
- Filey Lifeboat Station

General information
- Type: RNLI Lifeboat Station
- Location: Coble Landing, Foreshore Road, Filey, North Yorkshire, YO14 9LF, England
- Coordinates: 54.2113°N 0.2834°W
- Opened: 1804; RNLI 1852–present
- Owner: Royal National Lifeboat Institution

Website
- Filey RNLI Lifeboat Station

Filey Lifeboat Station is located at Coble Landing on Forshore Road in Filey, a seaside town approximately 40 miles (64 km) north-east of York, sitting between Scarborough and Bridlington on the east coast of North Yorkshire, England. It is one of eight operational RNLI lifeboat stations situated on the Yorkshire Coast.

A lifeboat station was established at Filey by local committee in 1804. Management of the station was transferred to the Royal National Institute for the Preservation of Life from Shipwreck (RNIPLS) in 1852, which became the Royal National Lifeboat Institution (RNLI) two years later.

The station operates the B-class (Atlantic 85) Inshore lifeboat, Marjorie Shepherd (B-928) and the smaller D-class (IB1) Inshore lifeboat, The Rotarian (D-859), both on station since 2021.

== History ==
References show that a 'North Country' lifeboat, one with its design based on the Greathead-class lifeboat, was first provided for Filey in 1804. It was operated by the Filey Lifeboat Committee, and funded from a combination of public subscription, with a donation of £50 from Lloyd's of London, insurance agents with a vested interest in preventing loss by shipwreck. However, no other records of manufacture have been found, nor of any service carried out.

In 1824, a new lifeboat for Filey was funded by the newly established Royal National Institute for the Preservation of Life from Shipwreck (RNIPLS). A 29-foot (8.8 m) 12-oared North Country lifeboat, built by Skelton of Scarborough, was placed on service. A stone-built boathouse was constructed at the foot of Carr Gate Hill (now Cargate).

At a meeting of the RNIPLS committee of management held on 9 December 1852, it was agreed to accept Filey Lifeboat Station as part of the Institution, and that Rear-Admiral Mitford was requested to form a local committee. A later meeting in February 1853 appropriated £54-9s-6d to bring the lifeboat, carriage, boathouse and roadway to a suitable level of repair.

The RNLI Silver Medal was awarded to boatman John Ruddock on 3 February 1859, in recognition of his long and gallant services, given to the Filey lifeboat, and other boats.

In the late spring of 1860, a hurricane hit Filey and destroyed all the boats and nets of the local fishermen. As the damaged items belonged mostly to the men who manned the lifeboat, an appeal was made in The Times to aid in the support of the fishermen's loss of livelihood. One of the letters written to the paper was by a local resident doctor who noted that the Filey Lifeboat (up until that point) had saved more lives at sea than any other station belonging to the RNLI in England.

A new 33-foot (10 m) self-righting 'Pulling and Sailing' (P&S) lifeboat, one with sails and (10) oars, was sent to Filey in November 1863, transported free of charge by the Great Northern and North Eastern railway companies. The cost of the lifeboat was defrayed by the gift of £250 from Mr R. W. and Mrs Hollon, lord mayor and lady of York. The donation was made at the suggestion of Mrs Hollon, to recognise their previous safe delivery from peril at sea.

At 12:00 on 26 November 1863, a large procession set out from Filey railway station, to accompany the new boat to the lifeboat station, where the lifeboat was named Hollon, and then launched on demonstration to the assembled crowd.

Some 20 years later, on hearing of the decision to replace the Filey lifeboat, Mr and Mrs R. W. Hollon made a further donation of £650, funding the lifeboat for a second time. Attending the inauguration ceremony on 13 September 1884, Richard Welch Hollon named the lifeboat Hollon the Second (ON 8).

In 1889, the lifeboat house, which had been extended in 1872, at a cost of £200, was sold for £15. A new boathouse was constructed near the foot of Sand Hill Lane, on the site of the present boathouse.

By 1907, Filey was again due for a replacement lifeboat. In the 23 years on station, Hollon the Second had been launched 37 times, but recorded no lives saved. This time, the cost of the lifeboat would be defrayed by the legacy of the late R. W. Hollon, and at a ceremony on 4 May 1907, the new lifeboat was named Hollon the Third (ON 570). In the following thirty years, Hollon the Third would come to be launched 110 times, and save the lives of 121 people.

Responding to an increasing amount of water-based leisure activity, the RNLI began trials of small fast Inshore lifeboats in 1963, placed at various locations around the country. These were easily launched with just a few people, ideal to respond quickly to local emergencies, and quickly proved to be very successful. More boats were deployed, and in 1966, the D-class (RFD PB16) Inshore lifeboat (D-86) was placed at Filey.

A new boathouse was constructed in 1991, on the same site as the 1889 lifeboat house, so that it could accommodate both the new Mersey-class All weather lifeboat (ALB), 12–13 Keep Fit Association (ON 1170), and the Inshore lifeboat (ILB).

It was announced in 2013, that with both Scarborough, 7 miles (11 km) to the north, and Bridlington, 11 miles (18 km) to the south, each due to receive a 25 knot Shannon-class All-weather lifeboat, a B-class (Atlantic 85) Inshore lifeboat would replace the Mersey-class All-weather lifeboat at Filey.

Even though the flanking stations received their new boats in 2016 and 2017, it would be a further four years, before the 17 knot Mersey-class All-weather boat was replaced with the fast response 35 knot Atlantic 85-class Inshore lifeboat, in 2021.

== Notable incidents ==
- 24 September 1935

The fishing trawler Skegness ran aground just by the cliffs at Speeton. Initially the captain of the vessel said that all was fine and he would await the high tide to re-float the ship. Unfortunately, before high tide arrived, the weather deteriorated. Within an hour, the wind had strengthened to gale force from the east and was driving the sea to the shore. At 23:10, the skipper of the Skegness was calling for help and the Filey lifeboat was launched. Due to the swell, they couldn't get near, so the Scarborough lifeboat was launched, but they were given the wrong location and headed for Filey Brigg. The Flamborough lifeboat was also launched, but just like the Filey lifeboat, she couldn't get near enough.

The Rocket Brigade (a volunteer unit that would fire rockets with lines to drag people off stricken ships) tried firing their rockets to the ship, which was only 420 feet (130 m) below them, but the fierce wind forced the rockets back onto the cliff; in fact the wind was so strong, that the Rocket Brigade crew had to crawl to the clifftop on their hands and knees. The lights on the ship were observed going out at 01:30 the following morning. In all, eleven sailors died, some of their bodies washed up onto the shore in the days after the tragedy, but most were never found.

- 23 June 1974

The motor mechanic on the station, Bob Appleby, collapsed and died during a launch.

- 15 June 1998

A Panavia Tornado aircraft of No. 29 Squadron RAF crashed into the sea, 30 miles (48 km) away from Flamborough Head. Both Filey and Bridlington lifeboats searched for 13 hours for the two aircrew, but the wreckage was later discovered during a sonar search by a Westland Sea King HAS6 from 819 Naval Air Squadron. Squadron Leader William Michael Vivian (pilot) and Flight Lieutenant Derek Stuart Lacey (navigator) did not eject and were both killed.

== Station honours ==
The following are awards made at Filey

- RNLI Silver Medal
  John Ruddock, Boatman – 1859
- RNLI Bronze Medal
  William Robinson, Second Coxswain – 1919
  George Boynton, Fisherman – 1919
  Michael Farline, Helm – 2004
- The Emile Robin Award for 2003
  awarded by The Shipwrecked Fishermen and Mariners' Royal Benevolent Society
  Michael Farline, Helm – 2004
- The Thanks of the Institution inscribed on Vellum
  Frank Jenkinson, Coxswain – 1983
  Malcolm Johnson, crew member – 1984
- A Framed Letter of Thanks signed by the Chairman of the Institution
  Malcolm Johnson, Coxswain – 2001
  Michael Farline, Helm – 2004
- Resuscitation Certificate awarded by the Royal Humane Society
  Richard Johnson, Third Mechanic – 2001

== Roll of honour ==
In memory of those lost whilst serving Filey lifeboat.

- Died after being run over by the lifeboat carriage wheels, 30 August 1930
  John W. Willis, 1930 (54)
- Collapsed and died during the launch of the lifeboat, 23 June 1974
  Robert 'Bob' Francis Appleby, Mechanic (53)

== Filey lifeboats ==
=== Pulling and Sailing (P&S) lifeboats ===
ON (Note: ON is the RNLI's Official Number of the boat.)	Name	Built	On station	Class	Comments
–	Unknown	1804	1804–1824	North Country lifeboat	(Note: No other build details are known.)
Pre-094	Unnamed	1823	1824–1863	29-foot North Country (P&S)	(Note: 29-foot x 8-foot 6in (12-oared) North Country non-self-righting lifeboat, built by Skelton of Scarborough, costing £94.)
Pre-404	Hollon	1863	1863–1884	33-foot Peake Self-righting (P&S)	(Note: 33-foot x 8-foot (10-oared) Peake-class self-righting (P&S) lifeboat, gift of Mr & Mrs R. Hollon of York, built by Forrestt of Limehouse, London, costing £263.)
8	Hollon the Second	1884	1884–1907	34-foot Self-righting (P&S)	(Note: 34-foot x 8-foot 1in (10-oared) self-righting (P&S) lifeboat, gift of Mr & Mrs R. Hollon of York, built by Woolfe of Shadwell, London, costing £346.)
570	Hollon the Third	1907	1907–1937	35-foot Self-righting (P&S)	(Note: 35-foot x 8-foot 3in (10-oared) self-righting (P&S) lifeboat, legacy of Mr R. W. Hollon of York, and gift of Mrs Hollon, built by Thames Ironworks of Blackwall, London, costing £855.)
650	Thomas Masterman Hardy	1915	1937–1940	35-foot Self-righting (P&S)	(Note: 35-foot x 8-foot 6in (10-oared) self-righting (P&S) lifeboat, gift of Mrs J. Thynne of London, built by S. E. Saunders of Cowes, costing £1,623 when new.); Previously at Lyme Regis.

Pre ON numbers are unofficial numbers used by the Lifeboat Enthusiasts' Society to reference early lifeboats not included on the official RNLI list.

=== Motor lifeboats ===
ON	Op. No. (Note: Op. No. is the RNLI's Operational Number of the boat carried on the hull.)	Name	Built	On station	Class	Comments
833	–	The Cuttle	1940	1940–1953	Liverpool	One of a handful of lifeboats that entered service during the Second World War.
917	–	Isa and Penryn Milstead	1953	1953–1968	Liverpool	
966	37-04	Robert and Dorothy Hardcastle	1962	1968–1991	Oakley	Previously at Boulmer
1170	12–13	Keep Fit Association	1991	1991–2021	Mersey	Withdrawn 29 April 2021 and replaced by an Atlantic 85-class ILB.

All-weather lifeboat withdrawn, 2021

=== Inshore lifeboats ===
==== D-Class ====
Op. No.	Name	On station	Class	Comments
D-86	Unnamed	1966–1968	D-class (RFD PB16)	
D-49	Unnamed	1970–1972	D-class (RFD PB16)	
D-202	Unnamed	1972–1986	D-class (RFD PB16)	
D-320	Filey Lion	1986–1993	D-class (EA16)	
D-446	Holme Team	1993–2001	D-class (EA16)	
D-563	Rotary District 1120	2001–2008	D-class (EA16)	
D-570	Roger B Harbour	2008–2010	D-class (IB1)	
D-728	Braund	2009–2021	D-class (IB1)	
D-859	The Rotarian	2021–	D-class (IB1)	

==== B-Class ====
Op. No.	Name	On station	Class	Comments
B-913	Pride of Fred. Olsen	2020–2021	Atlantic 85-class	(Evaluation)
B-928	Marjorie Shepherd	2021–	Atlantic 85-class	

=== Launch and recovery tractors ===
Op. No.	Reg. No.	Type	On Station	Comments
T9	BE 9914	Clayton	1931–1937	
T16	YW 3377	Clayton	1937–1940	
T36	FYM 853	Case L	1940–1957	
T29	FGC 64	Case L	1957–1964	
T48	KGP 853	Case LA	1964–1967	
T78	BYN 568B	Case 1000D	1967–1968	
T80	DLB 482C	Case 1000D	1968–1979	
T77	BGO 681B	Case 1000D	1979–1986	
T74	136 HLC	Case 1000D	1986–1990	
T109	G296 KUX	Talus MB-H Crawler	1990–2003	
T113	J794 VUX	Talus MB-H Crawler	2003	
T106	F760 BUJ	Talus MB-H Crawler	2003–2013	
T102	E387 VAW	Talus MB-H Crawler	2013–2019	
T104	E269 YUJ	Talus MB-H Crawler	2019–	

== See also ==
- List of RNLI stations
- List of former RNLI stations
- Royal National Lifeboat Institution lifeboats
