= Flamborough Lifeboat Station =

RNLI Lifeboat station in the East Riding of Yorkshire, England

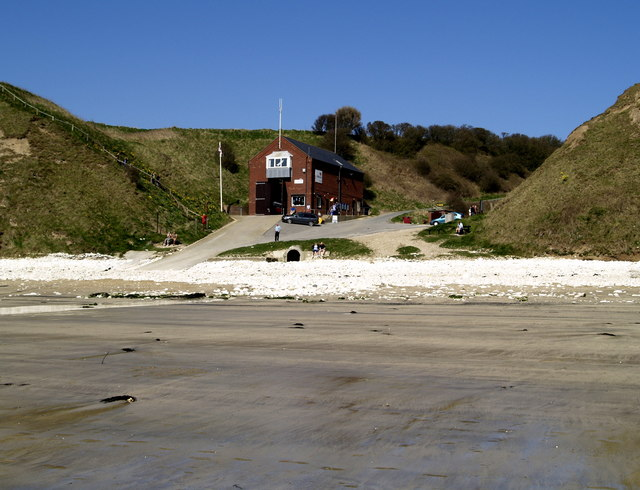
- Flamborough South Landing Lifeboat Station

- Location within East Riding of Yorkshire

General information
- Type: RNLI Lifeboat Station
- Location: South Landing, South Sea Road, Flamborough, East Riding of Yorkshire, YO15 1AE, England
- Coordinates: 54.1046°N 0.118968°W
- Opened: 1871
- Owner: Royal National Lifeboat Institution

Website
- Flamborough RNLI Lifeboat Station

Flamborough Lifeboat Station can be found at South Landing on South Sea Road at Flamborough, a village approximately 44 miles (71 km) to the east of York, on the promentory of Flamborough Head in the East Riding of Yorkshire, England.

Two lifeboat stations were established at Flamborough, by the Royal National Lifeboat Institution (RNLI) in 1871, at both the North Landing, and the South Landing.

The South Landing station closed in 1938. In 1993, the remaining All-weather lifeboat was withdrawn from North Landing, and the station closed, but an Inshore lifeboat was provided in the same year, operated from the South Landing station.

The station currently operates a B-class (Atlantic 85) Inshore Lifeboat Forever Yibba (B-820), on station since 2026.

== History ==
A north station at Flamborough was built in 1871 as No. 1 station, Flamborough. No. 2 site was built in the same year, but closed in 1938. Both sites were opened after the Great Gale of 1871 when many ships were wrecked along the east coast of England. As the coastline at Flamborough Head juts out for 6 miles (9.7 km) into the North Sea, having two sites on either side of the Head would mean that from wherever the wind was blowing in bad weather, at least one of the lifeboats could be launched. A slipway was added to the No. 1 site in 1890, but ultimately, the two Flamborough sites were amalgamated into one on the northern site in the 1930s. Both sites used skids and poles to aid the launching of the lifeboats into the water, and in 1934, when the No. 1 lifeboathouse was enlarged for the Elizabeth and Albina Whitley (ON 772), a turntable was also added at the top to aid recovery of the vessel.

A map showing the locations of both RNLI and independent lifeboat stations in Yorkshire

In 1992, the south site was demolished and rebuilt to accommodate lifeboats in one location. A rebuild was also necessary as the old No. 2 site was not big enough to accommodate the newer lifeboats and had been in use as a fishing store. The move to the old No. 2 site involved a withdrawal of the all-weather lifeboat (ALB) and an inshore lifeboat (ILB) being installed in its place. The crew at Flamborough were reluctant to take on an ILB instead of an ALB, which they put down to the tides and waters around Flamborough being particularly tricky. The new site was opened in 1993.

In 2018, the Flamborough lifeboat Elizabeth Jane Palmer featured in an episode of the BBC2 documentary Saving Lives at Sea.

On 30 June 2026, Flamborough welcomed the arrival of a new B-class (Atlantic 85) Inshore lifeboat Forever Yibba (B-959), replacing Elizabeth Jane Palmer.

== Notable incidents ==
=== Carol Sandra and North Wind (1984) ===
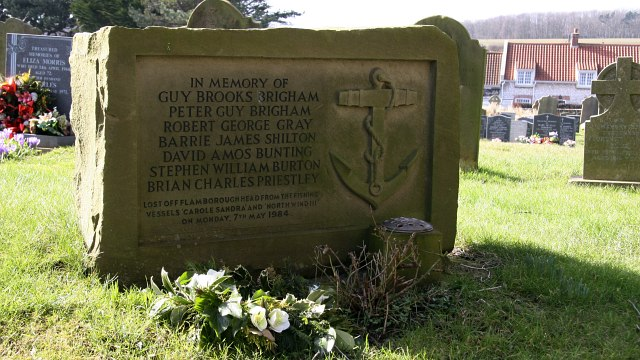
Memorial to lost fishermen in St. Oswald's churchyard

On the morning of 7 May 1984, the fishing coble, Carol Sandra left port at Bridlington to take her lobster and crab pots further out to sea. A storm was coming in and when she left harbour, the weather was deteriorating, so by the time she was out of the harbour, the waves were rolling at a height of 15 feet (4.6 m). At some point in the morning, the Carol Sandra sank without any signs, warnings, mayday calls or distress signals sent out. Just before noon, someone noticed the bow of a ship sticking up vertically out of the water and called the coastguard. A search was conducted by an RAF Search and Rescue helicopter, as well as the Flamborough Lifeboat and staff from the coastguard searching from the clifftops. A pleasure boat on a fishing trip, the North Wind III also helped with the search. As the North Wind III approached something that her crew had seen in the water, she was capsized by the rough sea, which catapulted all seven aboard into the water.

En route to the search area, the Flamborough Lifeboat's engine developed problems, so the Bridlington Lifeboat was launched so that the Flamborough Lifeboat could return for repairs. Unfortunately the Bridlington Lifeboat struck one of the pieces of wreckage from the Carol Sandra which jammed between her propeller and her hull. This meant deploying the Filey Lifeboat to the scene whilst the others went back to port. The RAF winchman in the helicopter was transferring one casualty from the water into the lifeboat when he bumped awkwardly into the wheelhouse and broke his pelvis. The casualty went into the water on one side of the boat, and then popped up on the other side where a lifeboatman rescued him. The winchman was taken to hospital, whilst another man managed to be rescued from the water on the winch without the winchman being present. The captain of the North Wind III and one other crew member (his son) found an air pocket underneath the upturned boat and were dragged ashore. Three of the fishermen drowned.

In all seven men drowned with only three of the bodies being found. The ashes of those who died were scattered in the North Sea. There is a memorial to the seven men lost in the village and another in the churchyard of St Oswald's in Flamborough.

== Station honours ==
The following are awards made at Flamborough:

- RNIPLS Silver Medal
  Capt. William Dunn, Master of the Providence – 1839
  William Parker, Capt. of the Pearl – 1853
  John Parker, Mate of the Pearl – 1853
- RNLI Silver Medal
  Robert Pockley, Coxswain – 1895
  George Leng, Coxswain – 1937
- RNLI Bronze Medal
  Edward A. Slaughter, Motor Mechanic – 1937
  George Pockley, Coxswain – 1971
- Mrs Porter’s gift 1937,
  (awarded for the Bravest Deed of the year by a lifeboat crew member)
  Edward A. Slaughter, Motor Mechanic – 1937
- Mrs Porter’s gift 1952,
  (awarded for the Bravest Deed of the Year by a lifeboat cre member}
  Robert Leng, Assistant Mechanic – 1952
- The Walter and Elizabeth Groombridge Award 2007
  (for the outstanding inshore lifeboat rescue of the year)
  Darren Pollard, Helm – 2008
- The Thanks of the Institution inscribed on Vellum
  Richard Chadwick, Coxswain – 1930
  Robert Leng, Assistant Motor Mechanic – 1952
  Alwyn Emmerson, crew member – 1971
  Alwyn Emmerson, crew member – 1975
  Darren Pollard, Helm – 2008
- A Framed Letter of Thanks signed by the Chairman of the Institution
  George Pockley, Coxswain – 1975
  L. Robson, Second Coxswain/Mechanic – 1987
  R. Sunley, Assistant Mechanic – 1987
  B. James, boat owner – 1987
- A Collective Letter of Thanks signed by the Chairman of the Institution
  Simon Robson, Helm – 1998
  Nigel Atkinson, crew member – 1998
  James Cross, crew member – 1998

== Roll of honour ==
In memory of those lost whilst serving Flamborough:

- Drowned when their coble Two Brothers capsized, trying to effect the rescue of three men in the coble Gleaner, who also drowned. 55 February 1909
  Melchoir Chadwick (37)
  George Gibbon (34)
  Thomas Leng Major (18)

== Flamborough lifeboats ==
=== No. 1 Station (North Landing) 1871-1993 ===
==== Pulling and Sailing (P&S) lifeboats ====
ON (Note: ON is the RNLI's Official Number of the boat.)	Name	Built	On station	Class	Comments
Pre-555	Gertrude	1871	1871–1887	33-foot Peake Self-righting (P&S)	(Note: 33-foot x 8-foot 6in (10-oared) self-righting (P&S) lifeboat, legacy of Mr J. S. Beckett of Tormoham, Devon, built by Woolfe of Shadwell, London, costing £293.)
151	Mary Frederick	1887	1887–1904	34-foot Self-righting (P&S)	(Note: 34-foot x 8-foot (10-oared) self-righting (P&S) lifeboat, legacy of Mrs M. A. Preston of Lytham St Annes, built by Watkins of Blackwall, London, costing £400.)
370	Lily Bird	1894	1904–1905	34-foot Self-righting (P&S)	(Note: 34-foot x 8-foot (10-oared) self-righting (P&S) lifeboat, gift of Mr S. Bird of East Cowes, built by Forrestt of Limehouse, London, costing £370.); Reserve lifeboat No.5, previously at Dunwich
549	Forester	1905	1905–1934	35-foot Self-righting (P&S)	(Note: 35-foot x 8-foot 3in (10-oared) self-righting (P&S) lifeboat, gift of the Ancient Order of Foresters, built by Thames Ironworks of Blackwall, London, costing £938.)

Pre ON numbers are unofficial numbers used by the Lifeboat Enthusiasts' Society to reference early lifeboats not included on the official RNLI list.

==== Motor lifeboats ====
ON	Op. No. (Note: Op. No. is the RNLI's Operational Number of the boat carried on the hull.)	Name	Built	On station	Class	Comments
772	–	Elizabeth and Albina Whitley	1934	1934–1948	Liverpool	
797	–	Howard D	1937	1948–1953	Liverpool	Previously at St Helier, and operated under German command during the Second World War.
915	–	Friendly Forester	1953	1953–1983	Liverpool	Sold in 1984, but has since returned to Flamborough and is on display at Haven Holidays Thornwick Bay Holiday Village, close to its old base at North Landing Station.
972	37-05	Will and Fanny Kirby	1963	1983–1993	Oakley	Previously at Seaham

No.1 Station (North Landing) closed 1993.

=== No. 2 Station (South Landing) 1871–1938 ===
==== Pulling and Sailing (P&S) lifeboats ====
ON	Name	Built	On station	Class	Comments
235	St Michael's, Paddington	1871	1871–1879	33-foot Peake Self-righting (P&S)	(Note: 33-foot x 8-foot (10-oared) Peake-class self-righting (P&S) lifeboat, gift of St. Michaels LB fund, built by Forrestt of Limehouse, London, costing £278.); Renamed in 1879
235	Grace and Sally of Broadoak	1871	1879–1880	33-foot Peake Self-righting (P&S)	(Note: Gift of Mr J. Hargreaves of Broadoak.); Renamed in 1880
235	Thomas and Isabella Firbank of Kingston-upon-Hull	1871	1880–1882	33-foot Peake Self-righting (P&S)	(Note: Legacy of Mr T. and Mrs I. Firbank of Kingston upon Hull.); Renamed in 1882
235	Matthew Middlewood	1871	1882–1901	33-foot Peake Self-righting (P&S)	(Note: Gift of Mr G. and Miss Middlewood of York.)
474	Matthew Middlewood	1901	1901–1933	35-foot Self-righting (P&S)	(Note: 35-foot x 8-foot 3in (10-oared) self-righting (P&S) lifeboat, gift of Mr G. Middlewood of Rufforth Hall, York, built by Thames Ironworks of Blackwall, London, costing £850.)
611	Jane Hannah MacDonald	1910	1933–1938	35-foot Self-righting (P&S)	(Note: 35-foot x 8-foot 6in (10-oared) self-righting (P&S) lifeboat, gift of Mrs MacDonald of Brighton, built by Thames Ironworks of Blackwall, London, costing £931.); Previously at Appledore and Eastbourne.

No.2 Station (South Landing) closed 1938.

=== Flamborough Lifeboat Station (South Landing) 1993– ===
Op. No.	Name	On station	Class	Comments
B-515	Vee Webber	1993–1994	B-class (Atlantic 21)	
B-703	Jason Logg	1994–2007	B-class (Atlantic 75)	
B-820	Elizabeth Jane Palmer	2007–2026	B-class (Atlantic 85)	
B-815	Peterborough Beer Festival III	2016–2017	B-class (Atlantic 85)	Relief boat on station October 2016–January 2017 whilst Elizabeth Jane Palmer was under repair.
B-883	Roy Snewin	2018	B-class (Atlantic 85)	Relief boat on station April 2018–August 2018 whilst Elizabeth Jane Palmer was under repair.
B-959	Forever Yibba	2026–	B-class (Atlantic 85)	

=== Launch and recovery tractors ===
Op. No.	Reg. No.	Type	On station	Comments
TW23Hc	K805 CUX	Talus MB-4H Hydrostatic (Mk2)	1993–2003	
TW18Hb	H710 RUX	Talus MB-4H Hydrostatic (Mk1.5)	2003–2012	
TW52Hc	Y506 JNT	Talus MB-4H Hydrostatic (Mk2)	2012–2022	
TW46Hb	V938 EAW	Talus MB-4H Hydrostatic (Mk1.5)	2022–2023	
TW52Hc	Y506 JNT	Talus MB-4H Hydrostatic (Mk2)	2023–	

== See also ==
- List of RNLI stations
- List of former RNLI stations
- Royal National Lifeboat Institution lifeboats
