= Seaham Lifeboat Station =

Former lifeboat station in County Durham, England

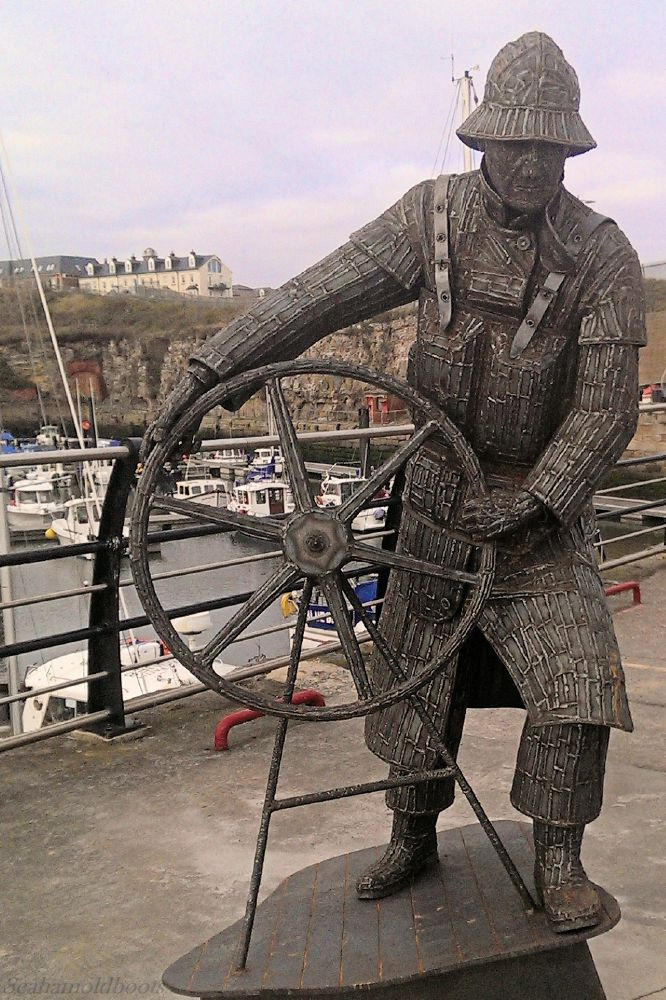
- The Coxswain, Seaham

- Seaham, Co. Durham

General information
- Status: Closed
- Type: RNLI Lifeboat Station
- Location: East Durham Heritage & Lifeboat Centre, Seaham Harbour Marina, Seaham, County Durham, SR7 7EE, England
- Coordinates: 54°50′18.4″N 1°19′37.9″W
- Opened: 1856
- Closed: 1979

Seaham Lifeboat Station was located at Seaham, a harbour town approximately 5.5 miles (8.9 km) south of Sunderland, on the east coast of County Durham.

A lifeboat was first stationed here in 1856, by the Seaham Fishermans Friendly Society. A lifeboat station, operated by the Royal National Lifeboat Institution (RNLI), was established in 1870.

After 124 years service, Seaham Lifeboat Station was closed in 1979, when faster lifeboats were placed at flanking stations.

== History ==
Construction of Seaham harbour was started in 1828 by landowner Charles Vane, 3rd Marquess of Londonderry, in order to ship out coal from nearby Rainton.

Under the Harbours, Docks and Piers Clauses Act 1847, companies operating Dock facilities were required by Act of parliament to provide a lifeboat, although it was only on 1 February 1855, that the RNLI committee of management voted to provide £10 and a set of lifebelts to each of two proposed Seaham lifeboats, one to be provided by the Marquess, and a second boat, provided by funds raised by the Seaham Fishermen's Friendly Society.

With no other evidence found of the Marquess' boat, no construction details, no naming ceremony, and no service records, it is now believed that this boat was never provided. The Seaham Fishermen's Friendly Society boat, a 32-foot x 8-foot 6in lifeboat, similar in design to ones provided to Sunderland and West Hartlepool, was constructed by Hawkesworth of Torquay, and scheduled to be sailed from Torquay to Seaham by 1 August 1856. The lifeboat was named Friend of All Nations, and was housed in a boathouse constructed at the south end of Terrace Beach.

In 1870, a request was made to the RNLI, for the provision of a lifeboat for Seaham, which was accepted. A 33-foot self-righting 'Pulling and Sailing' (P&S) lifeboat, one with (10) oars and sails, was ordered from Woolfe & Son of Shadwell, and a boathouse, costing £189-2s-11d, was constructed on the east side of Lighthouse cliff, the land provided by George Vane-Tempest, 5th Marquess of Londonderry. The lifeboat and launch carriage had cost £388-7s-6d, and was funded by a gift of £400 to the RNLI, raised by the needlework of four sisters. The boat arrived in Seaham on 1 September 1870, and at a ceremony attended by several thousand people, the boat was named Sisters Carter of Harrogate.

The sale of the Seaham boat Friend of All Nations in 1872 raised £12-19s-0d, which was donated to RNLI funds.

When the Lady Ann was wrecked against the Seaham harbour north pier wall in 1874, with huge waves crashing over the top, the lifeboat wasn't launched, but the lifeboat men rescued three crew using ropes. Despite courageous efforts by John Marshall Jnr., who climbed aboard the wreck, they were unable to save the Master. John Marshall Jr. was awarded the RNLI Silver Medal.

In 1908, construction began of a new boathouse and deep-water slipway on the outer wall of South Dock, along with an extra pier for protection. Completed in 1909, the boathouse and slipway cost £3,744-18s-7d. A 42-foot lifeboat, the Bradford (ON 350) was placed on station in 1909. Although an older boat from 1893, she had been fitted with an engine in 1906, and for a short time, Seaham operated two lifeboats.

In 1911, both the No.1 station lifeboat Skynner (ON 155), and No.2 station lifeboat Bradford (ON 350), were withdrawn, when a 38ft Watson-class motor-powered lifeboat Elliot Galer (ON 602) was placed on service. The No.2 boathouse and slipway became the No.1 station.

The Elliot Galer would rescue 15 people on 21 August 1918, after The Stewarts's Court had been torpedoed by German submarine UB-112.

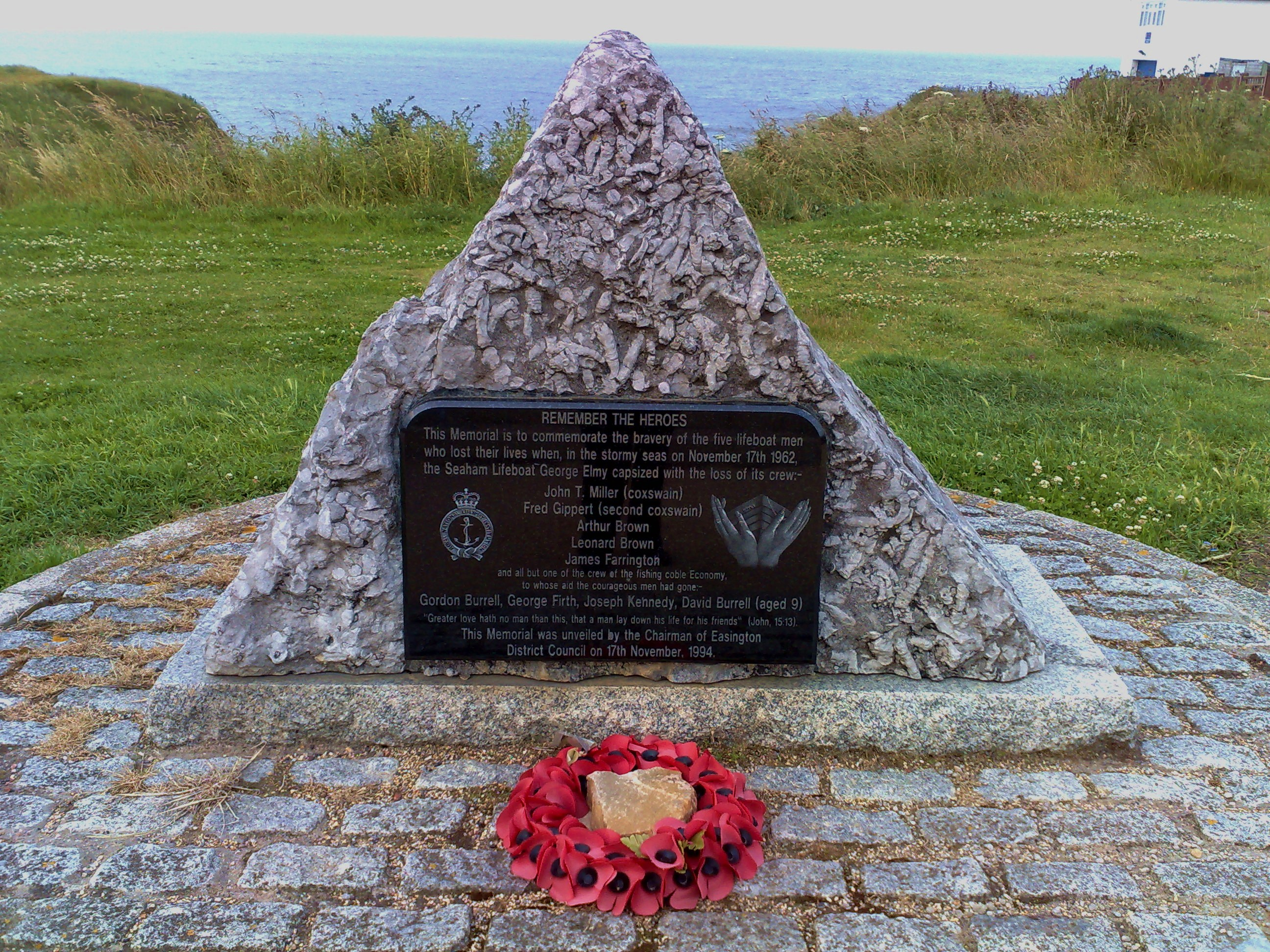
Seaham Lifeboat Memorial

In 1950, Seaham got a new lifeboat. The George Elmy (ON 873) was a non-self-righting Liverpool-class lifeboat, and would come to be launched 26 times, and rescued 20 lives. On service to the fishing boat Economy on 17 November 1962, and having rescued the five crewmen on board, she capsized on the return to Seaham harbour. All five lifeboatmen, plus the crew of four from the Economy, including a nine-year-old boy, were lost,

After a couple of relief boats were placed on station following the disaster, Seaham would receive a new lifeboat in 1963, a self-righting Oakley-class lifeboat The Will and Fanny Kirby (ON 972). She would go on to be launched 46 times, and save the lives of 66 people. On 11 November 1973, 18 Anglers were rescued off the North Pier, having been cut off. Coxswain Arthur Farrinton was awarded the RNLI Bronze Medal.

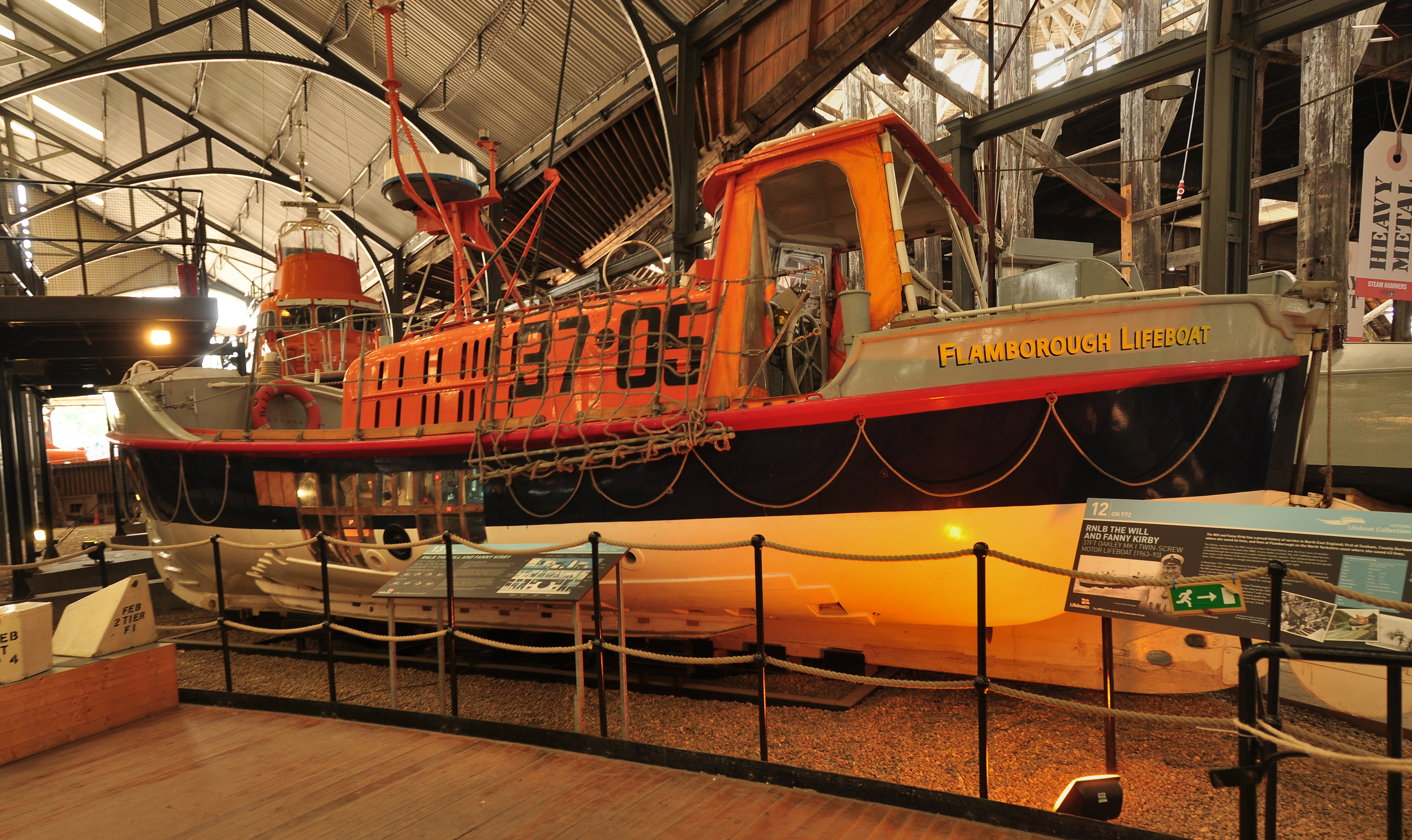
The Will and Fanny Kirby (ON 972)

The Will and Fanny Kirby had a top speed of 8½ knots. In 1977, a 15 knot Waveney-class lifeboat 44-018 The Scout (ON 1044) was placed at Hartlepool, and with an 18-knot Arun-class scheduled for Tynemouth the following year, it was decided to close Seaham Lifeboat Station in 1979.

In the 109 years since 1870, the Seaham lifeboat was launched 137 times, and saved the lives of 289 people. The Will and Fanny Kirby would be stationed at Flamborough in 1983. The 1855 boathouse had been demolished, although there is still the pathway to the beach. The remains of the 1909 boathouse and slipway can still be seen. The 1870 boathouse now forms part of the East Durham Heritage and Lifeboat Centre, and houses the George Elmy (ON 873) lifeboat, which is fully restored.

== Station honours ==
The following are awards made at Seaham.

- RNLI Silver Medal

John Marshall Jr., Second Coxswain – 1874

- RNLI Bronze Medal

Arthur Farrington, Coxswain – 1974

- Medal Service Certificate

Malcolm Maconochie, Motor Mechanic – 1974
Ronald Leng – 1974
Maurice Thornton – 1974

== Roll of honour ==
In memory of those lost whilst serving Seaham lifeboat.

- Liverpool-class lifeboat George Elmy (ON 873), a non-self-righting lifeboat, capsized after rescuing the crew of the fishing boat Economy on 17 November 1962:

Lifeboat crew:

John Tyrie Miller, Coxswain (50)
Frederick A. Gippert, Second Coxswain (50)
James O. Farrington, Bowman (44)
Arthur Leonard Brown, Motor Mechanic (40)
Arthur Brown, crew member (49)

Crew members of the Economy:

Joseph Kennedy
George Firth (40)
Gordon Burrell (29)
David Burrell (9)

== Seaham lifeboats ==
=== Seaham Fishermen's Friendly Society lifeboat ===
Name	Built	On station	Class	Comments
Friend of All Nations	1856	1856−1872	32-foot Self-righting (P&S)	(Note: 32-foot x 8-foot 6in (10-oared) self-righting (P&S) lifeboat, provided by the Seaham Fishermen's Friendly Society, built by Hawkesworth of Torquay.)

=== RNLI lifeboats ===
==== Pulling and Sailing (P&S) lifeboats ====
ON (Note: ON is the RNLI's Official Number of the boat.)	Name	Built	On station	Class	Comments
Pre-543	Sisters Carter of Harrogate	1870	1870−1887	33-foot Peake Self-righting (P&S)	(Note: 33-foot x 8-foot 6in (10-oared) Peake-class self-righting (P&S) lifeboat, gift of Misses Carter of Harrogate, built by Woolfe of Shadwell, London, costing £288.)
155	Skynner	1887	1887−1911	34-foot Self-righting (P&S)	(Note: 34-foot x 8-foot (10-oared) self-righting (P&S) lifeboat, legacy of Mr W. H. Skynner of London, built by Watkins & Co, of Blackwall, London, costing £390.)

==== Seaham No. 2 ====
ON	Name	Built	On station	Class	Comments
350	Bradford	1893	1909−1911	42-foot Self-righting (P&S)	(Note: 42-foot x 11-foot (12-oared) self-righting (P&S) lifeboat, gift of the City of Bradford LB fund, built by Woolfe of Shadwell, London, costing £896 when new. Motor conversion in 1906, and 1907 upgrade.); Reserve lifeboat No.2, previously at Ramsgate.

==== Motor lifeboats ====
ON	Op. No. (Note: Op. No. is the RNLI's Operational Number of the boat carried on the hull.)	Name	Built	On station	Class	Comments
602	–	Elliot Galer	1910	1911−1936	38-foot Watson	
791	–	Elizabeth Wills Allen	1936	1936−1950	Liverpool	
873	–	George Elmy	1949	1950−1962	Liverpool	
797	–	Howard D	1937	1962−1963	Liverpool	
793	–	Clarissa Langdon	1937	1963	Liverpool	
972	37-05	The Will and Fanny Kirby	1963	1963−1979	37-foot Oakley	

Pre ON numbers are unofficial numbers used by the Lifeboat Enthusiast Society to reference early lifeboats not included on the official RNLI list.

== See also ==
- List of RNLI stations
- List of former RNLI stations
- Royal National Lifeboat Institution lifeboats
