= Seahouses Lifeboat Station =

RNLI lifeboat station in Northumberland, England

Seahouses Lifeboat Station (formerly North Sunderland)

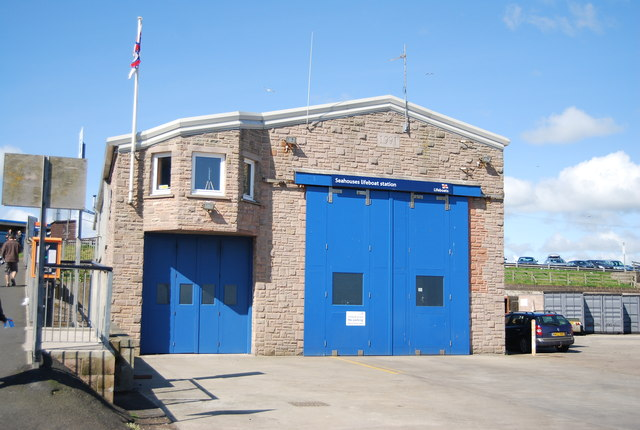
- Seahouses Lifeboat Station

- Location within Northumberland
- Former names: North Sunderland Lifeboat Station

General information
- Type: RNLI Lifeboat Station
- Location: Seahouses Lifeboat Station, Seafield Road, Seahouses, Northumberland, NE68 7SH, UK
- Coordinates: 55°34′58.4″N 1°39′14.4″W
- Opened: 1832 Crewe Trustees; 1859 RNLI
- Owner: Royal National Lifeboat Institution

Website
- Seahouses RNLI Lifeboat Station

Seahouses Lifeboat Station is located in Seahouses, a harbour village approximately 20 miles (32 km) south-east of Berwick-upon-Tweed, in Northumberland.

A lifeboat was first stationed here by the Crewe Trustees in 1832. The station was taken over by the Royal National Lifeboat Institution (RNLI) in 1859. Originally known as North Sunderland Lifeboat Station, the name was formally changed to Seahouses Lifeboat Station in 1999.

The station currently operates a Shannon-class All-weather lifeboat 13-36 John and Elizabeth Allan (ON 1343), and a D-class (IB1) Inshore lifeboat Grace Darling (D-828).

== History ==
When a harbour was created near the village of North Sunderland in Northumberland, it gradually developed to become the separate village of Seahouses. Over the years, the two villages grew in size, and have now effectively merged.

In 1832, three lifeboats were placed on public display at Newcastle Quay. The first was a new lifeboat for a new station at North Sunderland, established by the Crewe Trustees, a charitable organisation founded by Nathaniel Crewe, Bishop of Durham in 1704, and part of the Newcastle and District Shipwreck Association (NSA) since 1824. A stone-built boathouse was constructed, and the lifeboat was supplied by Mr E. Robson of South Shields

There are no specific records of any service by this lifeboat. In 1838, the lifeboat was transferred to Holy Island, with North Sunderland receiving with the 27-foot lifeboat, designed by Capt. John Foulerton, RN, built by Shore, and previously stationed on Holy Island.

On 7 September 1838, the paddle steamer Forfarshire ran aground on the Farne Island Rocks and broke in two. Much is available to read of the subsequent heroism of Grace Darling and her father William Darling. The North Sunderland lifeboat did not launch to the wreck, the coxswain instead opting for a small coble that he believed more suited to effect a rescue around the rocks. One of the seven crew was William Darling, brother of Grace. They battled to arrive at the wreck, only to find the rescue had been completed, but unable to return home due to the weather, they then spent two days seeking shelter in a disused building, all other 'accommodation' at the Farne Island Lighthouse being full.

When the 1838 lifeboat was deemed unfit for service in 1851, an order was placed with Forrestt of Limehouse, London for a 30-foot (9.1 m) 'Self-righting', similar in design to the James Beeching lifeboat, which had won the prize awarded by the president of the Royal National Institute for the Preservation of Life from Shipwreck (RNIPLS), Algernon Percy, 4th Duke of Northumberland.

In 1859, the secretary of the Crewe Trustees requested that the RNLI take over the management of the North Sunderland Lifeboat Station, for which the trustees would give a grant of £30 per annum to the RNLI. The existing 30-foot lifeboat was never launched on service for the RNLI, who in 1865 decided to replace it. A 33-foot (10 m) ten-oared self-righting 'Pulling and Sailing' (P&S) lifeboat, (one using oars and sail), was built by Forrestt of Limehouse, London, costing £274-19s-3d, and a new launch carriage cost a further £102-11s-0d. The lifeboat and carriage were transported to North Sunderland free of charge by the Great Northern and North Eastern railway companies. At a ceremony on 12 June, the boat was named Joseph Anstice by the donor, Mrs Anstice of Tynemouth.

Thomas Pringle retired in May 1886 after serving as Coxswain for 21 years. As was common practice, he was awarded the RNLI Silver Medal in recognition of his many service calls. Only 17 months later, he would drown in a boating accident on 6 October 1887.

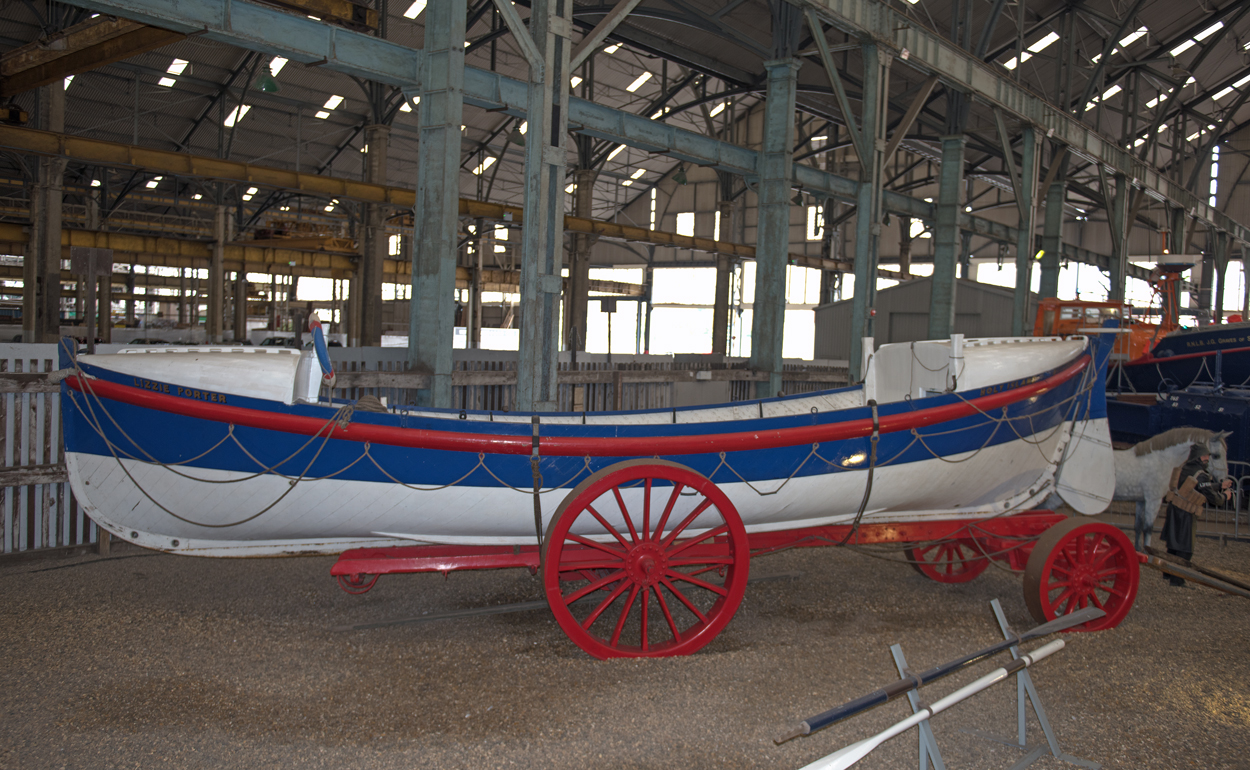
RNLB Lizzie Porter (ON 597)

North Sunderland would receive their first motor-powered lifeboat in 1936, the non-self-righting Liverpool-class lifeboat, with a 35 hp (26 kW) petrol engine, delivering a speed of 7.47 knots (8.60 mph; 13.83 km/h). A new boathouse nearer the harbour was constructed. Previously, P&S lifeboats had cost a few hundred pounds. Costing £3,447, the cost was met from the combined funds of three legacies, and the boat was in effect given three names, The William and James, the Ridge Matthews, and the Abigail Gardiner, each chosen by the donor. At a ceremony on 5 September 1936, the boat was formally named W.R.A. (ON 781) by Helen Percy, Duchess of Northumberland. Each name was inscribed on a plaque inside the boat.

A D-class (RFD PB16) Inshore lifeboat would be stationed at North Sunderland in 1964. The rise in leisure activity at the coast demanded a quick response vessel, and these boats would quickly show their value. In the first 35 years on station to 1999, the inshore boats would launch just over 300 times, saving 85 lives.

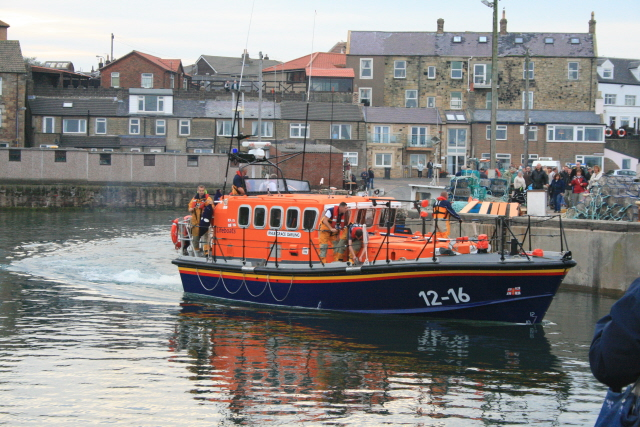
Mersey-class 12-16 Grace Darling

In 1991, a new boathouse was constructed to house the Mersey-class lifeboat 12-16 Grace Darling (ON 1173) and Talus launch tractor, with improved crew facilities, and storage for the D-class.

On 9 April 1999, on the request of station personnel, the RNLI agreed that North Sunderland station be formally renamed Seahouses Lifeboat Station with immediate effect.

For two years, the station had the unusual occurrence of having two lifeboats with the same name, the new D-class (IB1) also being named Grace Darling (D-828) in 2018.

After 29 years on station, Mersey-class lifeboat 12-16 Grace Darling (ON 1173) was retired in 2020, and sold to the ADES Uruguay lifeboat service. She was renamed ADES 28 Grace Darling, based in Colonia del Sacramento. She would be replaced by 13-36 John and Elizabeth Allan (ON 1343), a 25 knot Water-jet powered Shannon-class lifeboat, costing over £2 million. The boat was funded by the late professor James Allan, and named after his parents.

== Station honours ==
The following are awards made at North Sunderland / Seahouses.

- RNIPLS Gold Medal

Lt. John Brunton, RN., H.M. Coastguard, Newton-by-the-Sea – 1828

- Gold medallion, awarded by the Royal Humane Society

William Darling, Lighthouse Keeper – 1838
Grace Horsley Darling – 1838

- Silver Medal, awarded by the Glasgow Humane Society

Grace Horsley Darling – 1838

- Silver Medal, awarded by the Edinburgh and Leith Humane Society

Grace Horsley Darling – 1838

- RNIPLS Silver Medal

William Darling, Lighthouse Keeper – 1838
Grace Horsley Darling – 1838

John T. Knight, Boatman, H.M. Coastguard, North Sunderland – 1853

- RNLI Silver Medal

Thomas Pringle, Coxswain – 1886

James Robson, Coxswain – 1908

- Silver Medal, awarded by The King of Norway

James Robson, Coxswain – 1909

- RNLI Bronze Medal

Thomas Dawson, Coxswain – 1959

- The Thanks of the Institution inscribed on Vellum

Rev. F. R. Simpson, Honorary Secretary – 1876

Thomas Hall and the crew of the Golden Horn – 1932

George Dawson, Coxswain – 1943

Stephen Priestley, Helm – 1996

- Vellum Service Certificate

Darren Shell – 1996

- Member, Order of the British Empire (MBE)

Thomas Douglas Dawson, Coxswain – 1971QBH

Robert Heslop Reay - Honorary Secretary – 1991

- British Empire Medal

Robert Charles Dawson Douglas, Coxswain – 1992

== North Sunderland / Seahouses lifeboats and tractors ==
=== Crewe Trustees lifeboats ===
ON (Note: ON is the RNLI's Official Number of the boat.)	Name	Built	On station	Class	Comments
–	Unnamed	1832	1832–1838	Non-self-righting	(Note: Non-self-righting lifeboat, built by E. Robson of South Shields.)
Pre-127	Unnamed	1827	1838–1851	27-foot Palmer	(Note: 27-foot x 6-foot (6-oared) Palmer-class non-self-righting lifeboat, built by Shore of Blackwall, London, modified to Palmer design by Harton of Limehouse, London, costing £95 when new.); Previously at Holy Island.
Pre-255	Unnamed	1852	1852–1865	30-foot Self-righting (P&S)	(Note: 30-foot x 7-foot 4in (10-oared) self-righting (P&S) lifeboat, funded by the Crewe Trustees, built by Forrestt of Limehouse, London, costing £150.)

Pre ON numbers are unofficial numbers used by the Lifeboat Enthusiast Society to reference early lifeboats not included on the official RNLI list.

=== Pulling and Sailing (P&S) lifeboats ===
ON	Name	Built	On station	Class	Comments
Pre-428	Joseph Anstice	1865	1865–1884	33-foot Peake Self-righting (P&S)	(Note: 33-foot x 8-foot (10-oared) Peake-class self-righting (P&S) lifeboat, gift of Mrs Anstice of Tynemouth, built by Forrestt of Limehouse, London, costing £275.)
2	Thomas Bewick	1884	1884–1906	34-foot Self-righting (P&S)	(Note: 34-foot x 8-foot (10-oared) self-righting (P&S) lifeboat, legacy of Miss I. Bewick of Gateshead, built by Forrestt of Limehouse, London, costing £363.)
557	Forster Fawcett	1906	1906–1925	35-foot Self-righting (P&S)	(Note: 35-foot x 8-foot 3in (10-oared) self-righting (P&S) lifeboat, legacy of Miss T. C. Fawcett of Maidenhead, built by Thames Ironworks of Blackwall, London, costing £810.)
597	Lizzie Porter	1909	1925–1936	35-foot Self-righting (P&S)	(Note: 35-foot x 8-foot 6in (10-oared) self-righting (P&S) lifeboat, legacy of Miss E. Porter of Halifax, built by Thames Ironworks of Blackwall, London, costing £823 when new.); Previously at Holy Island. Now part of the RNLI Collection at Chatham Historic Dockyard.

=== All-weather lifeboats ===
ON	Op. No. (Note: Op. No. is the RNLI's Operational Number of the boat carried on the hull.)	Name	Built	On station	Class	Comments
781	–	W. R. A.	1936	1936–1954	Liverpool	
927	–	Grace Darling	1954	1954–1967	Liverpool	Now part of the RNLI Collection at Chatham Historic Dockyard.
991	37-20	Edward and Mary Lester	1967	1967–1989	Oakley	
980	37-13	William Henry and Mary King	1964	1989–1990	Oakley	Previously at Cromer and Bridlington
982	37-15	Ernest Tom Neathercoat	1965	1990–1991	Oakley	Previously at Wells-next-the-Sea
1173	12-16	Grace Darling	1991	1991–2020	Mersey	Sold to ADES Uruguay, renamed ADES 28 Grace Darling
1343	13-37	John and Elizabeth Allan	2019	2020–	Shannon	

=== Inshore lifeboats ===
Op. No.	Name	On station	Class	Comments
D-37	Unnamed	1964	D-class (RFD PB16)	
D-53	Unnamed	1965	D-class (RFD PB16)	
D-6	Unnamed	1966	D-class (RFD PB16)	
D-37	Unnamed	1967	D-class (RFD PB16)	
D-157	Unnamed	1968–1980	D-class (RFD PB16)	
D-271	Unnamed	1980–1988	D-class (Zodiac III)	
D-377	Unnamed	1988–1997	D-class (EA16)	
D-529	Martin John and Ann	1997–2008	D-class (EA16)	
D-686	Peter Downes	2008–2018	D-class (IB1)	
D-828	Grace Darling	2018–	D-class (IB1)	

=== Launch and recovery tractors ===
Op. No.	Reg. No.	Type	On station	Comments
T37	GGF 497	Case L	1954–1961	
T48	KGP 853	Case LA	1961–1963	
T70	12 GXD	Case 1000D	1963–1972	
T71	519 GYM	Case 1000D	1972–1980	
T74	136 HLC	Case 1000D	1980–1986	
T97	C282 LNT	Talus MB-H Crawler	1986–1998	
T98	B688 HUJ	Talus MB-H Crawler	1998–2006	
T117	L784 JNT	Talus MB-H Crawler	2006–2021	
SC-T19	HF69 CXV	SLARS (SC Innovation)	2020–	David Cooper

== See also ==
- List of RNLI stations
- List of former RNLI stations
- Royal National Lifeboat Institution lifeboats
