= Alf (barque) =

Three-masted Norwegian barque

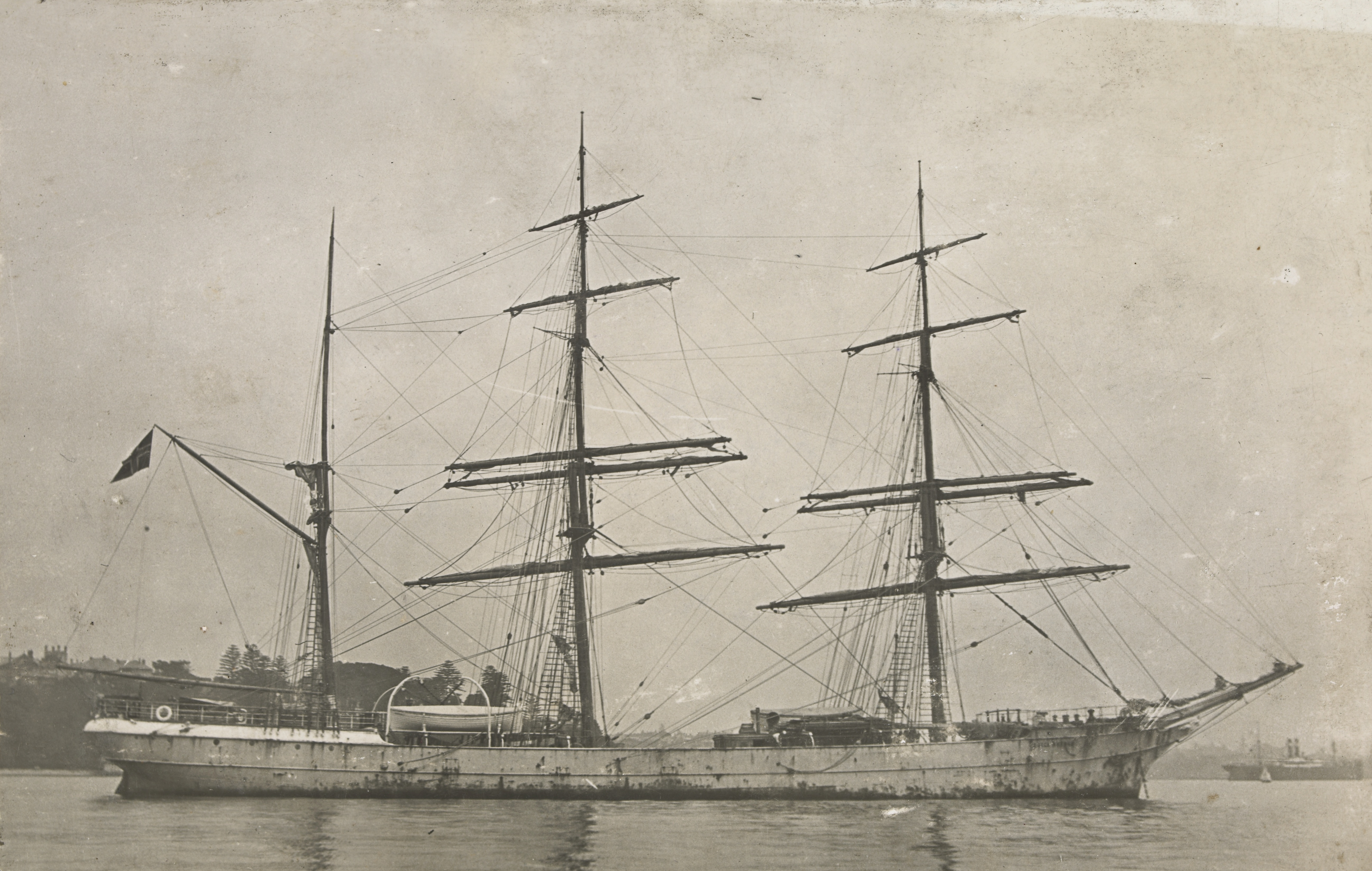
- Adolph Harboe

History
- Name: Inchgreen (1876– ); Adolph Harboe (1891–1903); Alf (-1909)
- Owner: W Lindsay & Co (1876– ); Fr. Harboe (1891–1903); Actieselsk Alf (Chr. Nielsen & Company) (-1909)
- Port of registry: (United Kingdom) Greenock (1876– ); (Denmark) Sjaelskør (1891–1903); (Norway) Laurvig (-1909)
- Builder: Caird & Company, Greenock, Scotland
- Laid down: 1876
- Identification: Code Letters NVDH (1891); Code Letters NSHW (1893); Code Letters NHBG (1895–1903)
- Fate: Became stranded becoming a total Wreck on Haisbro Sands 24 November 1909 off Norfolk, England

General characteristics
- Tonnage: 1,091 gross register tons (GRT)
- Length: 219 ft (67 m)
- Beam: 34 ft (10 m)
- Draft: 20 ft (6.1 m)
- Installed power: Sails
- Sail plan: Barque
- Crew: 15–23

Alf was a three-masted Norwegian barque which became stranded and then wrecked on 23 November 1909 on Haisbro Sands, off the coast of Norfolk. She was originally built in 1876 as Inchgreen for Scottish owners. In the 1890s she was sold to Danish owners and renamed Adolph Harboe. Around the turn of the 20th century she was sold to Norwegian owners and renamed Alf, serving until she was wrecked off the coast of Norfolk.

== History ==
The Barque Alf was built at the shipyards of Caird and Company in Greenock, Scotland in 1876. She was constructed with an iron hull and she had three masts. She was ordered by W Lindsay and Company of Greenwich and she was initially called Inchgreen. In 1878, she sailed to Sydney, Australia with a crew of 23 and 13 passengers, arriving on 18 December.

By 1891, she had been sold to Danish owners Fr. Harboe of Skjelskør, who renamed her Adolph Harboe. The code letters NVDH were allocated. In 1893, her code letters were NSHW. By 1895, the code letters NHBG were allocated. She was still on the Danish register in 1903. Later, she was purchased by Actieselsk Alf (Chr. Nielsen & Company) and renamed Alf.

== Final voyage ==
The Alf had crossed the North Sea from Porsgrunn in Norway with a cargo of timber. She was heading for the port city of Liverpool with a crew of fifteen men aboard, including captain Orberg. On Tuesday 23 November 1909, Alf had reached the north east coast of Norfolk in good time but it was now dark, foggy and very cold. The master was unable to locate the Haisbro light vessel with the consequence that his ship ploughed into the Haisborough sands three miles (4.8 km) south-east of the Haisbro Light vessel. Captain Orberg soon realized he could do nothing to get the ship off the sand and that the only course of action was to abandon Alf. He ordered that the ship's boats be launched to get himself and his crew clear of the sandbank. The first mate was ordered to take charge of the port boat whilst the captain would take the starboard boat. The first mate was about to board his boat with the second mate close behind when a wave caught the boat and flung it away from the ship, breaking its tethers and leaving the two men clinging to the wreck of the Alf.

=== Drowning ===
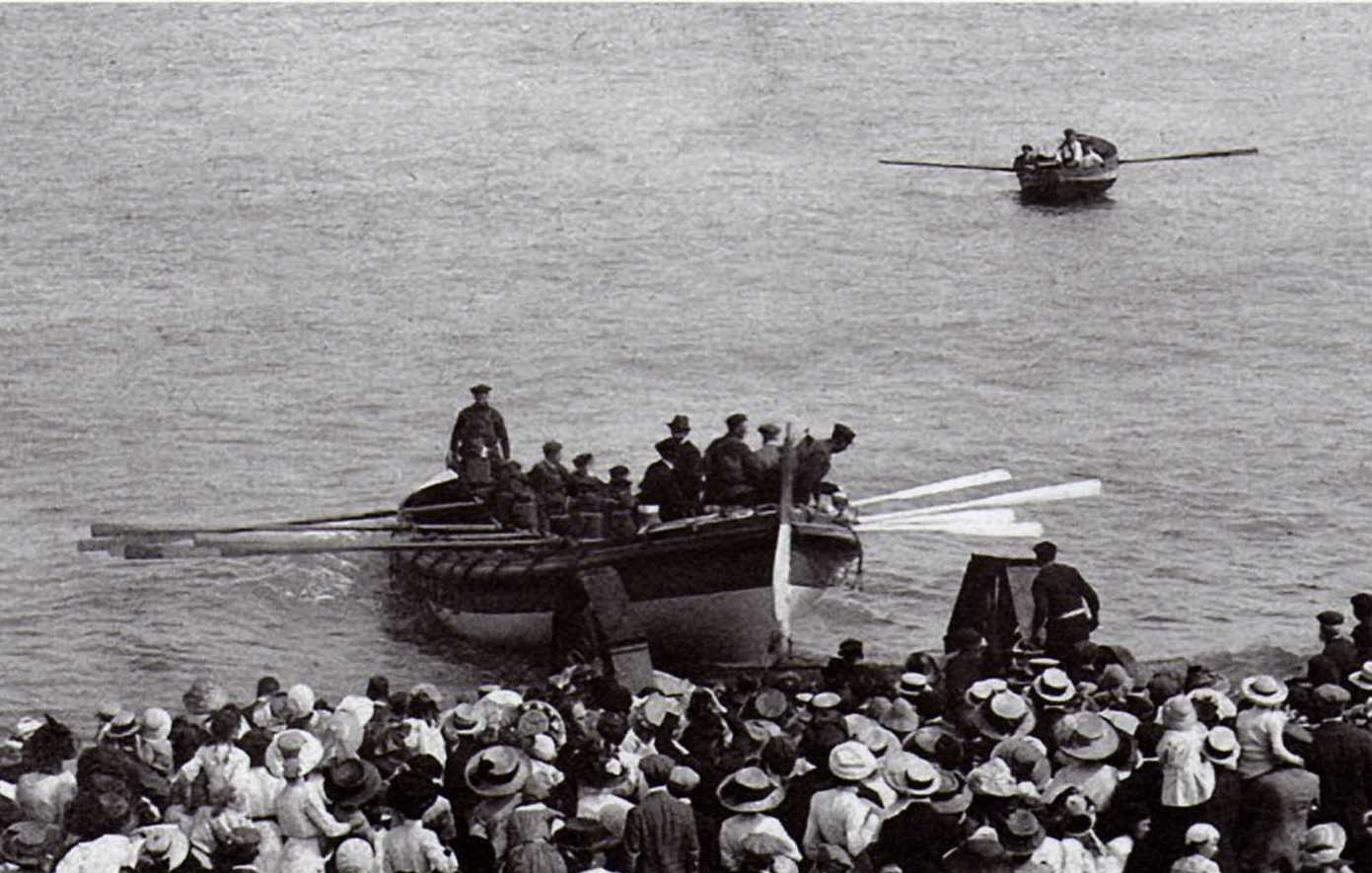
The Cromer Lifeboat Louisa Heartwell, ON 495, being launched from Cromer Beach

There was no hope of the two small boats getting back alongside the barque and the two men watched as the two boats with the thirteen crewmen aboard drifted away out of their sight. With the first mate still on the wreck, the ship's carpenter had taken charge of the port boat. The boat had got into difficulties only a hundred yards from the Alf when a wave caught the boat capsizing it, and throwing the men inside into the cold sea. The captain in the starboard boat was nearby and saw the disaster and was soon rescuing the men in the sea. The small boat, struggling with the conditions, was unable to save three of the sailors, who drowned, but managed to save the other six men. There were now ten men in the boat and they drifted, barely afloat, until dawn, when the fog cleared. A couple of miles from Cromer, the men were picked up by the ship Chanticleer who took them to Great Yarmouth. One of the men who had been pulled from the capsized boat was suffering from extreme hypothermia and died before reaching Great Yarmouth.

=== Rescue ===
The two stranded sailors on board the Alf watched their ship being destroyed. In the ships' stores the men retrieved some flares and throughout the night they lit them up. Eventually the signals were seen by the master of the Haisbro light vessel. He telephoned the coastguard. The distress call finally reached Cromer and at 10:15 pm, the Cromer lifeboat Louisa Heartwell was launched. This was to be the first rescue by the Cromer Lifeboat with Henry Blogg as coxswain. Blogg was thirty three years old and had been a member of the lifeboat crew since the age of eighteen. James "Buttons" Harrison had had to retire as coxswain due to ill health. Blogg and his crew of seventeen proceeded to the Alf. Soon after the launch the Lug sail was hoisted. By 1:00 am the Louisa Heartwell had reached the Haisbro light vessel. The master of the light vessel gave Blogg a bearing and reported that more flares had been seen an hour earlier.

Twenty minutes later the Louisa Heartwell had located the wrecked Alf. The lifeboat manoeuvred alongside the wreck and shouted and called but no response was seen or heard. Coxswain Blogg could see that both the Alf's boats had been launched so he assumed that all the crew had abandoned ship. Blogg supposed that they were too late and decided to search the area for the launched boats. After several hours of searching in vain, Blogg decided it was time to return home. They were fifteen miles (24 km) from Cromer and now the wind and the tide were against the exhausted crew. Coxswain Blogg decided to head for Sea Palling, where the lifeboat could be anchored, and the crew rest until conditions improved.

=== New information ===
After the Louisa Heartwell had been at anchor at Sea Palling for two hours, and dawn had broken, out of the mist came the Great Yarmouth steam drifter King. As she drew closer she hailed coxswain Blogg and reported to him that they had seen the wreck of the Alf and had passed as close as they could safely get. The captain could see that there were two men clinging to the mizzen rigging. The two sailors had gone below, searching for paraffin and materials to make more flares at the time of the lifeboat's first call to the wreck. With the noise of the sea, wind and flapping sail cloth the two men had not heard the rescuers' calls. Blogg blamed himself for not thoroughly checking the wreck and with this in mind set a course back to Alf.

=== Broken in half ===
The Louisa Heartwell found that Alf was in a bad way when she returned to the scene. The barque had broken in two and her cargo of timber was washing out. The waves were crashing across her deck, which was now under water. Coxswain Blogg manoeuvred his boat under lee quarter of Alf, and held the Louise Heartwell in this position despite her stern's being struck by a huge wave. The exhausted first mate and the second mate descended the mizzen rigging and dropped into the lifeboat. Coxswain Blogg quickly turned the boat, hoisted the lugsail, and set a course for Great Yarmouth. One hour after the Louisa Heartwell arrived in Yarmouth, the Chanticleer came into port with the other nine survivors. The Cromer men had been at sea for fifteen hours. The lifeboat returned to Cromer on 24 August at 2:00pm; she had damage to her stern band and six of her oars had been broken.

== Position of the wreck of the Alf today ==
The wreck is located at: 52°54′N 01°43′E at a depth of 10 m (33 ft) in sand on the Haisborough Sands.

- 24.1 kilometres (15.0 mi) North of Hemsby
- 24.2 kilometres (15.0 mi) East-north east of North Walsham
- 27.9 kilometres (17.3 mi) North of Caister on Sea
- 28.2 kilometres (17.5 mi) East of Cromer

== Cromer Lifeboat Crew ==
The Rescue of the Barque Alf
Louisa Heartwell
Name	Rank
Henry G Blogg	Coxswain
W Davis	Second Coxswain
J Davis	Bowman
J Cox	
H Nockells	
G "Crow" Rook	
C Brackenbury	
G "Buckrum" Balls	
Robert "Skinback" Cox	crew
A Balls	
G Blogg	
W "Will Doll" Rix	
A Allen	
C Cox	
G Stimpson	
A Balls	
W Allen	
C Allen	
