= RNLB Louisa Heartwell =

Lifeboat

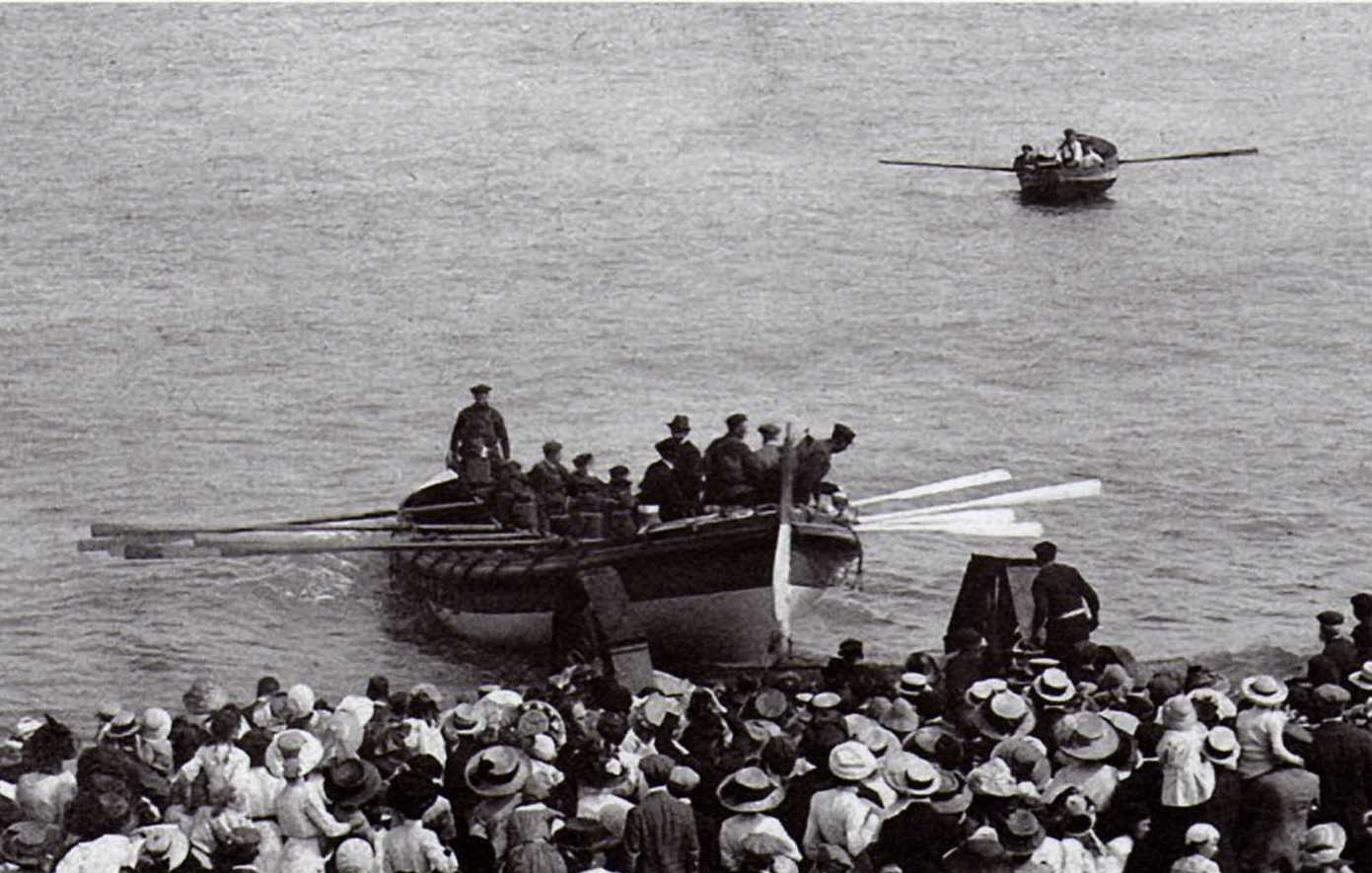
- RNLB Louisa Heartwell (ON 495)

History

British RNLI Flag
- Name: Louisa Heartwell
- Owner: Royal National Lifeboat Institution (RNLI)
- Builder: Thames Iron Works, Leamouth, London
- Official Number: ON 495
- Donor: Legacy of £700 bequeathed to the RNLI by Miss Emily Heartwell of Upper Holloway, London
- Station: Cromer
- Cost: £981 12s 0d
- Laid down: 1901
- Christened: 9 September 1902, by Lady Suffield
- Completed: 1902
- Fate: Sold out of service 20 May 1931, converted to a motor cruiser and renamed Waiora, Became a houseboat in the 1990s on the Chichester canal. Now displayed the Historic Lifeboat Collection, Chatham Dockyard, Kent.

General characteristics
- Type: Liverpool boat Pulling and Sailing (non self-righting)
- Length: 38 ft 0 in (11.58 m) overall
- Beam: 10 ft 9 in (3.28 m)
- Propulsion: Sail and rowed by 14 oars
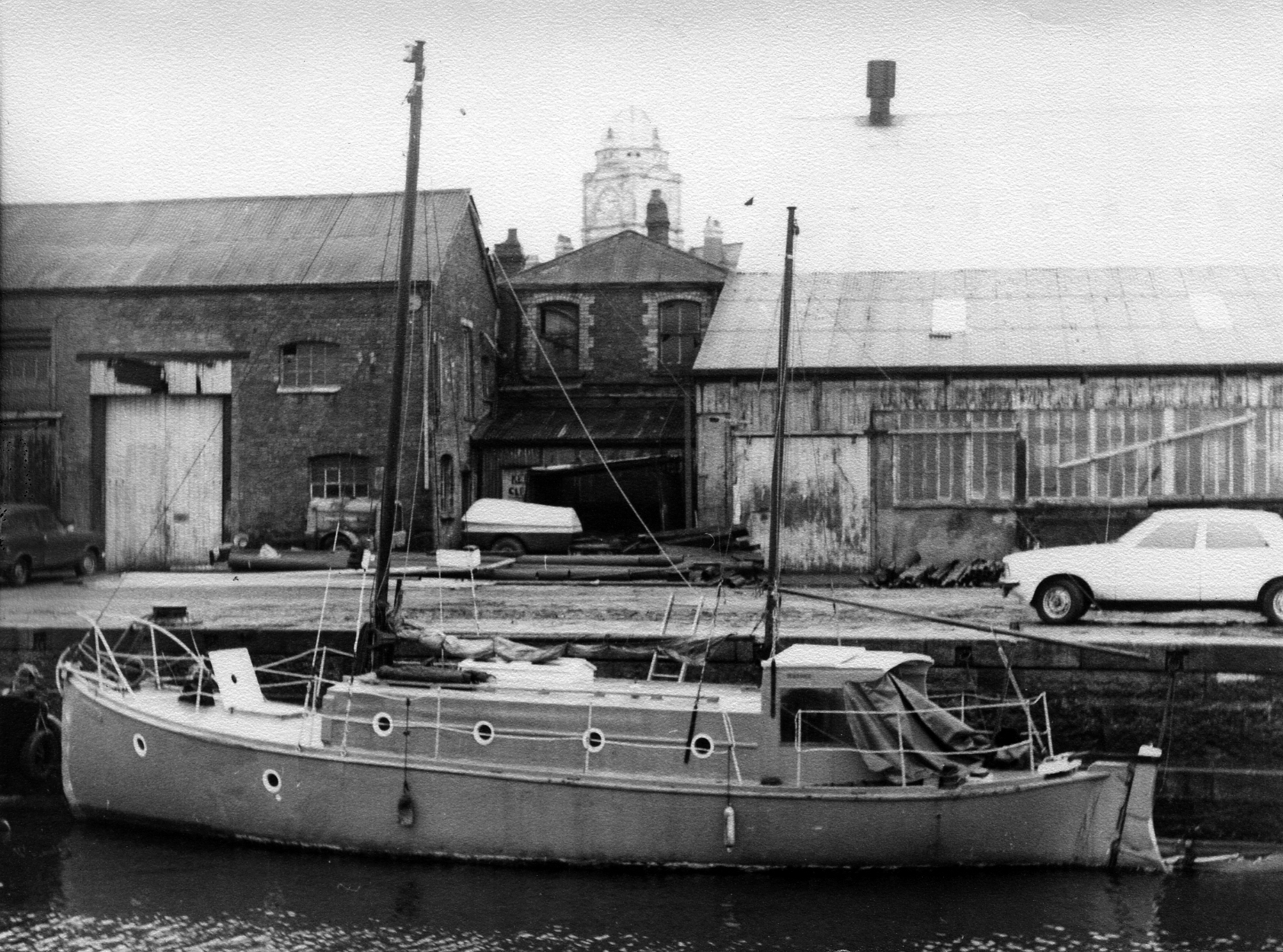
- Waiora at Barry Dock in 1978

RNLB Louisa Heartwell (ON 495) was the sixth lifeboat to be stationed at Cromer on the coast of the English county of Norfolk She was launched from the beach station and was on station from 1902 to 1932. During her period on station at Cromer the Louisa Heartwell had only two coxswains during her 29-year career. They were Matthew James "Buttons" Harrison until his retirement in 1909, and then Henry George Blogg.

In 1996, Louisa Heartwell arrived in Chichester by road and was used as a houseboat, until she was acquired in 2019 by Premier Marinas, who in April 2020 donated her to the RNLI for restoration and display. As of 25 March 2021, she is now on display at the Historic Lifeboat Collection in Chatham, Kent.

== New lifeboat house ==
With the arrival of the new Liverpool-class Pulling and Sailing lifeboat Louisa Heartwell, Cromer also got a new lifeboat house. This was needed as the new lifeboat and her carriage were much larger than the previous lifeboat Benjamin Bond Cabbell (ON 12). The new lifeboat house was opened in 1902 and remained in use until the 1960s, when it then became the lifeboat museum. With the advent of the new Henry Blogg Museum, this building is once again a lifeboat house, and is used by Cromer's inshore lifeboat.

== Notable rescues ==
=== Steamship Fernebo ===
The Swedish cargo steamer Fernebo was laden with timber when on 9 January 1917 an explosion in the ship's boiler broke the Fernebo in two. The Cromer Lifeboat Louise Heartwell with coxswain Henry Blogg at the helm had been at sea for several hours in difficult conditions attending the Greek steamer Pyrin. Blogg and his exhausted crew were now asked to attend the Fernebo. The sea conditions were so bad that the lifeboat was unable to clear the beach. Meanwhile, the crew of the Fernebo had managed to launch a small boat from the stricken vessel. Aboard were six crew members but the little boat was capsized in the surf. All six of the little boat's occupants were rescued from the waves through efforts of rescuers on the beach. In the late afternoon the Fernebo's two halves had grounded. One half was alongside a wooden groyne with the other, half a mile to the east. After failed attempts to make a further rescue with rocket apparatus, the Louise Heartwell launched again at 9:30 pm. During this attempt the lifeboat lost three oars and five of her oars were smashed. Not to be beaten, once more with spare oars and after some rest, Blogg and his crew launched to the Fernebo. This time the lifeboat managed to get alongside the wreck long enough to rescue the eleven remaining crewmen. The lifeboat returned to the shore at 1:00 am to a cheering crowd who had stayed to watch the rescue from the beach. Henry Blogg and his crew had been at sea for fourteen hours. For this action Henry Blogg received an RNLI Gold Medal. Acting second Coxswain William Davies was awarded the Silver Medal and twelve of the crew were awarded the Bronze Medal, the first time the RNLI Bronze Medal had been awarded. Part of the wreck of the Fernebo remains and can sometimes be seen on Cromer beach at low tide opposite the Doctor's Steps.

== Service and rescues ==
Date	Casualty	Lives saved
1903
28–31 December	Steamship Enriquetta of Grangemouth, stood by.	
1904
8–10 October	Steamship Rosalind of Newcastle, stood by & assisted to save vessel.	17
8 December	Five fishing boats of Cromer, Stood by.	
1906
1 February	Steamship Newburn of Newcastle, stood by.	
17–18 September	Schooner Zuma of Wisbech, assisted to save vessel.	9
1907
11 February	Steamship Atbara of London, Saved.	12
14 December	Barge Britisher of London, stood by and gave help.	
1908
1 March	Barque Lodore of Liverpool, stood by and gave help.	
24 October	Lugger John Robert of Great Yarmouth, gave help.	
1909
23 November	Barque Alf of Larvik, saved.	2
21 December	Barquentine Albatross of Lowestoft, saved.	8
1910
15 February	Barge Resurga of London, gave help.	
20 April	Steamship Haakon of Arendal, stood by.	
17 December	Schooner Desdemona of Thurso, assisted to save vessel.	5
1911
4-6 December	Ship Walkure of Hamburg, gave help.	
1912
29 August	Trawler Saint Antoine Dde Padoue of Nieuport, Landed 21 from Haisborough light-vessel.	
27 November	Hoveller James and Ellen of Great Yarmouth, stood by while beaching.	
1913
27 February	Ketch Industry of Hull, assisted to save vessel.	
6 May	Fishing boats Katie, Harriet and John & Mary of Sea Palling, saved boats.	9
1915
8–9 January	Steamship New Oporto of West Hartlepool, saved.	7
18–20 January	Ketch Thomas Stratton of Maldon, assisted to save ketch.	4
27–29 March	Steamship Ida of Haugesund, assisted to save vessel.	
27 May	Steamship BodilL of Esbjerg, Saved.	14
17–19 September	Steamship Mimona of Fredrikstad, assisted to save vessel.	
1916
14 January	Steamship Havfru of Christiania (Oslo), Saved.	1
16–17 March	Steamship Ladt Londonderry of Sunderland, assisted to save vessel.	
28 March	Schooner Ann of Goole, saved	5
30 August	Steamship Mitcham of London, saved.	22
21 December	Fishing lugger Chieftain of Cromer, saved.	3
1917
9 January	Steamship Pyrin of Piraeus, saved.	16
9–10 January	Steamship Fernebo of Gothenburg, saved.	11
27 November	Steamship Kronprinsessan Victoire of Haugesund, saved.	6
21 December	Motor fishing boat Admiral Jellicoe of Great Yarmouth, stood by.	
26 December	Steamship Pollcrea of London, gave help.	
1918
25–26 February	Motor barge Innisberg of Glasgow, assisted to save barge.	5
30 September - 1 October	Steamship Inna of Sunderland, assisted to save vessel.	1
1919
17–19 November	HM Hired steam trawler General Botha of Aberdeen, assisted to save vessel.	
30 November	Steamship Refrigerant of Lorient (es War Coppice of London), rendered assistance.	
1920
24 June	Motor schooner Danefolk of Copenhagen, assisted to save vessel.	23
20–21 August	Steamship Bavaria of Cologne, rendered assistance.	
	Motor launch Dot, saved launch.	2
	Steamship Inverawe of Leith, stood by and assisted to save vessel.	
1923
14 January	Steam trawler Lord Cecil of Grimsby, assisted to save vessel.	
21 April	Steamship Nystrand of Skien, stood by.	
Total		182
