= Henry Blogg =

Most decorated RNLI lifeboatman

Henry George Blogg GC BEM
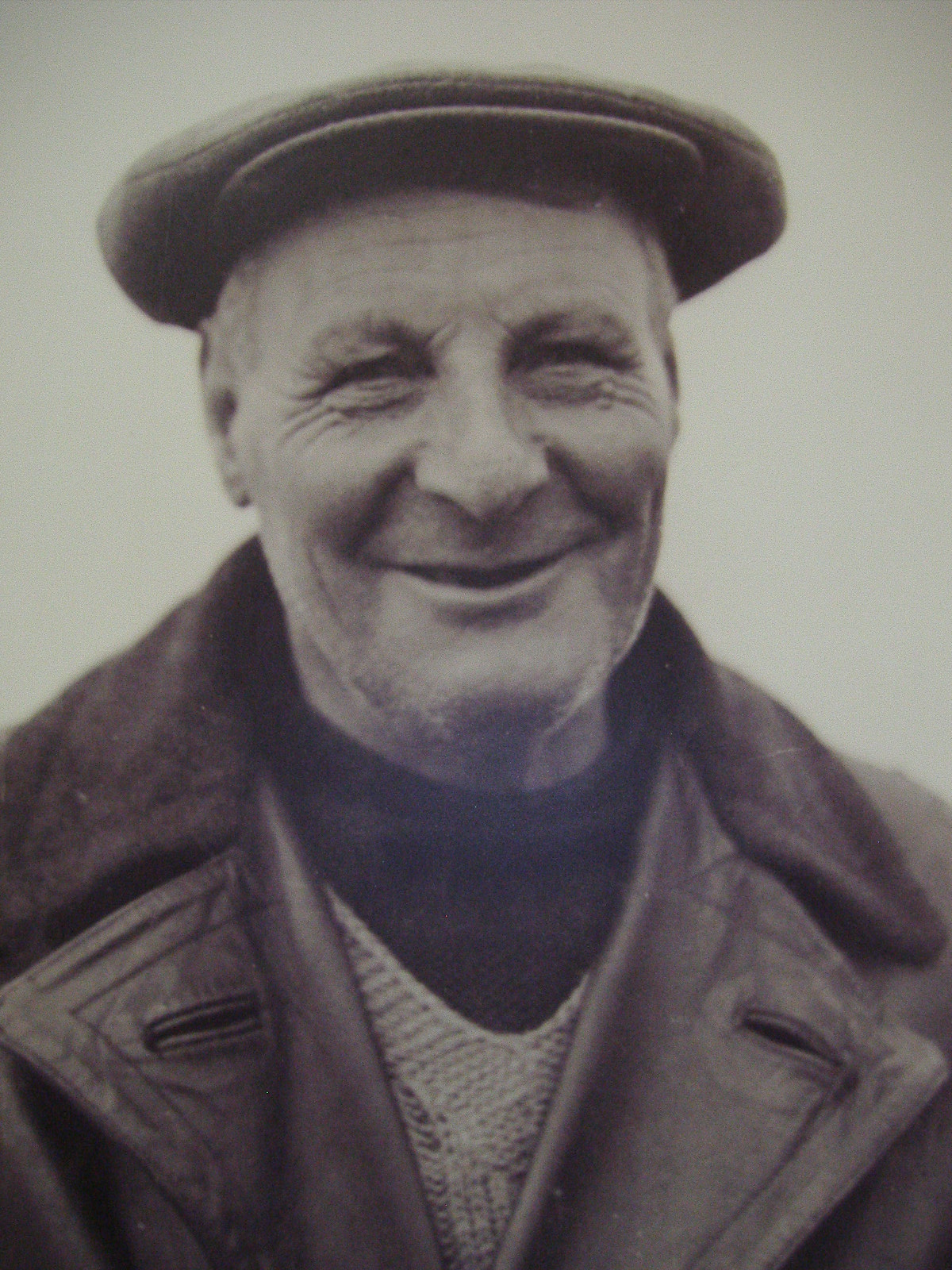
- Henry Blogg GC BEM
- Born: 6 February 1876; Cromer, Norfolk, UK
- Died: 13 June 1954 (aged 78); Cromer, Norfolk, UK
- Occupations: Crab fisherman Coxswain of the Cromer lifeboat (1909–1947)
- Parent: Mother: Ellen Blogg

Henry George Blogg GC BEM (6 February 1876 – 13 June 1954) was a lifeboatman from Cromer on the north coast of Norfolk, England, and the most decorated in Royal National Lifeboat Institution (RNLI) history.

Blogg of the Cromer Lifeboat Station is referred to as "the greatest of the lifeboatmen". From the rescue of the crew of the Pyrin and then of half of the crew of the Fernebo in 1917, through to his near drowning in the course of the rescue of survivors of the wreck of the SS English Trader in 1941, he was awarded the gold medal of the RNLI three times and the silver medal four times, the George Cross, the British Empire Medal, and a series of other awards.

== Life ==
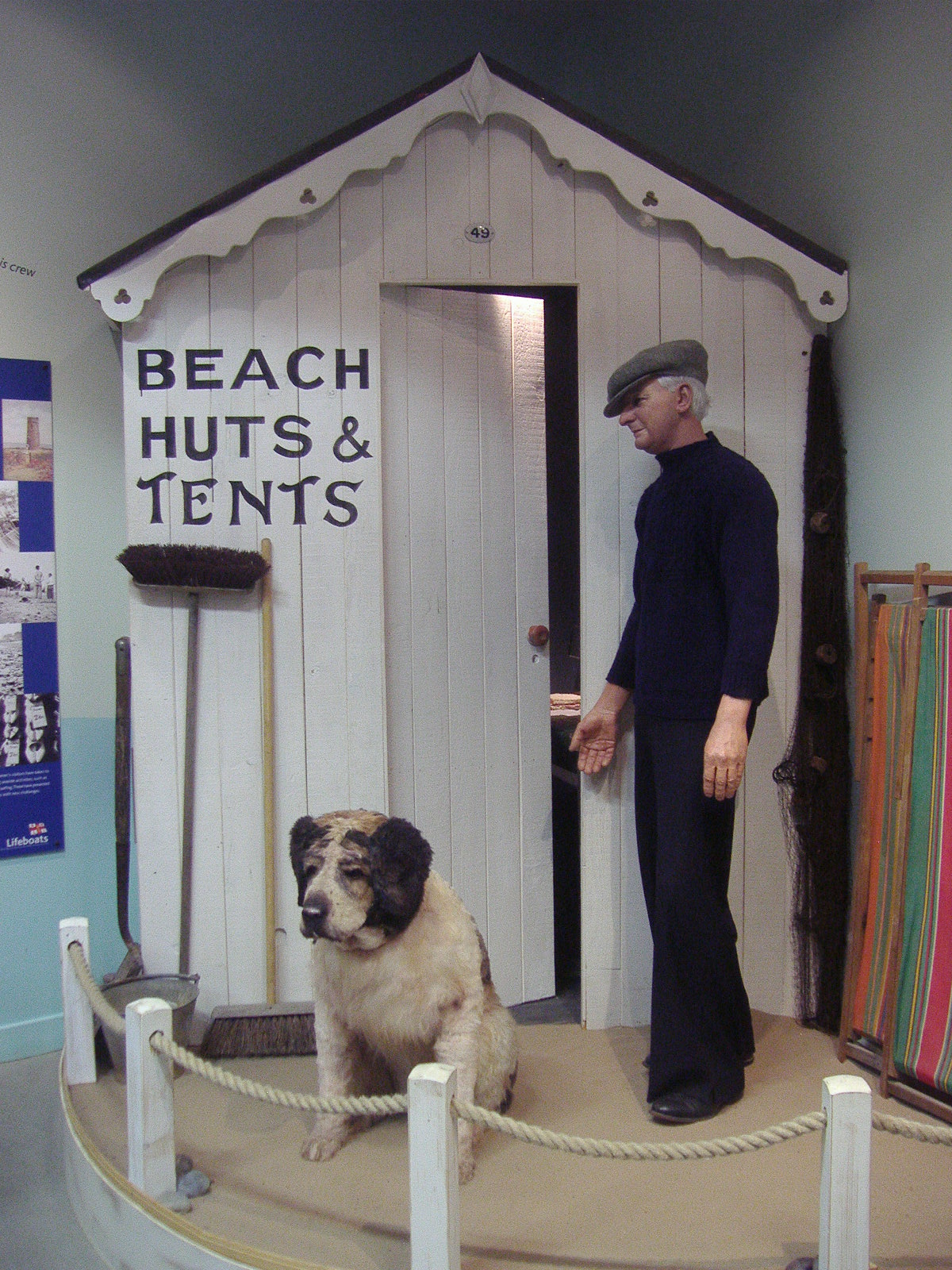
Tableau of Henry Blogg and his dog Monte at the RNLI Henry Blogg Museum, Cromer

Born the son of Ellen Blogg, one of the children of Thomas Blogg, a Cromer fisherman. Blogg was brought up in the family of James Davies (whose son John became Henry's stepfather after John Davies married Ellen Blogg in 1881), himself coxswain of the Cromer lifeboat. He first went to sea as a lifeboatman in 1894 in the rowing lifeboat Benjamin Bond Cabbell and then served in the Louisa Heartwell as second coxswain under Jimmy 'Buttons' Harrison. When coxswain Harrison retired in 1909 due to ill health, Blogg won the vote to take on the leadership role.

Away from lifeboat duties, Blogg was foremost a crab fisherman but Cromer being a popular holiday resort, he also ran a deckchair and beach hut hire business.

At the end of the 19th and the beginning of the 20th century lifeboats around the coast of Britain relied on the strength of the oarsmen and the power of the wind. The Cromer boat was launched from an open beach, and judgement and determination were the prime requirements of the coxswain. In the early hours of a fierce January morning in 1917 the Cromer lifeboat was launched to aid a vessel just in sight off Cromer, the Pyrin. The Cromer men rowed their boat through the breakers, succeeding in coming alongside the stricken vessel, and taking off her crew. They rowed back to Cromer. As they reached the beach the Swedish vessel the Fernebo struck a naval mine and was blown in half. The two-halves drifted towards the beach.

From one half, about 16 men set out in a ship's boat. As they reached the edge of the breakers onto the beach, their boat capsized. Teams of men, grasping each other's arms, had walked into the water, and they were able to help the men from the boat, and aid them ashore. Meanwhile, the lifeboat was rehoused on its trailer and was pushed again into the breakers, to launch to the other half of the Fernebo.

The ferocity of the sea threw the boat back onto the beach. The crew needed to recarriage the boat and try again at least three times. It was not until midnight, under the light of searchlights from the clifftop, that the lifeboat finally reached the stricken half-vessel and took off its crew. Blogg had led his men for nearly 24 hours of heroic effort.

In 1924 Blogg was awarded the Empire Gallantry Medal by the King. In 1927, Blogg was awarded a gold watch and his crew a silver watch each after a rescue on the Haisborough Sands.

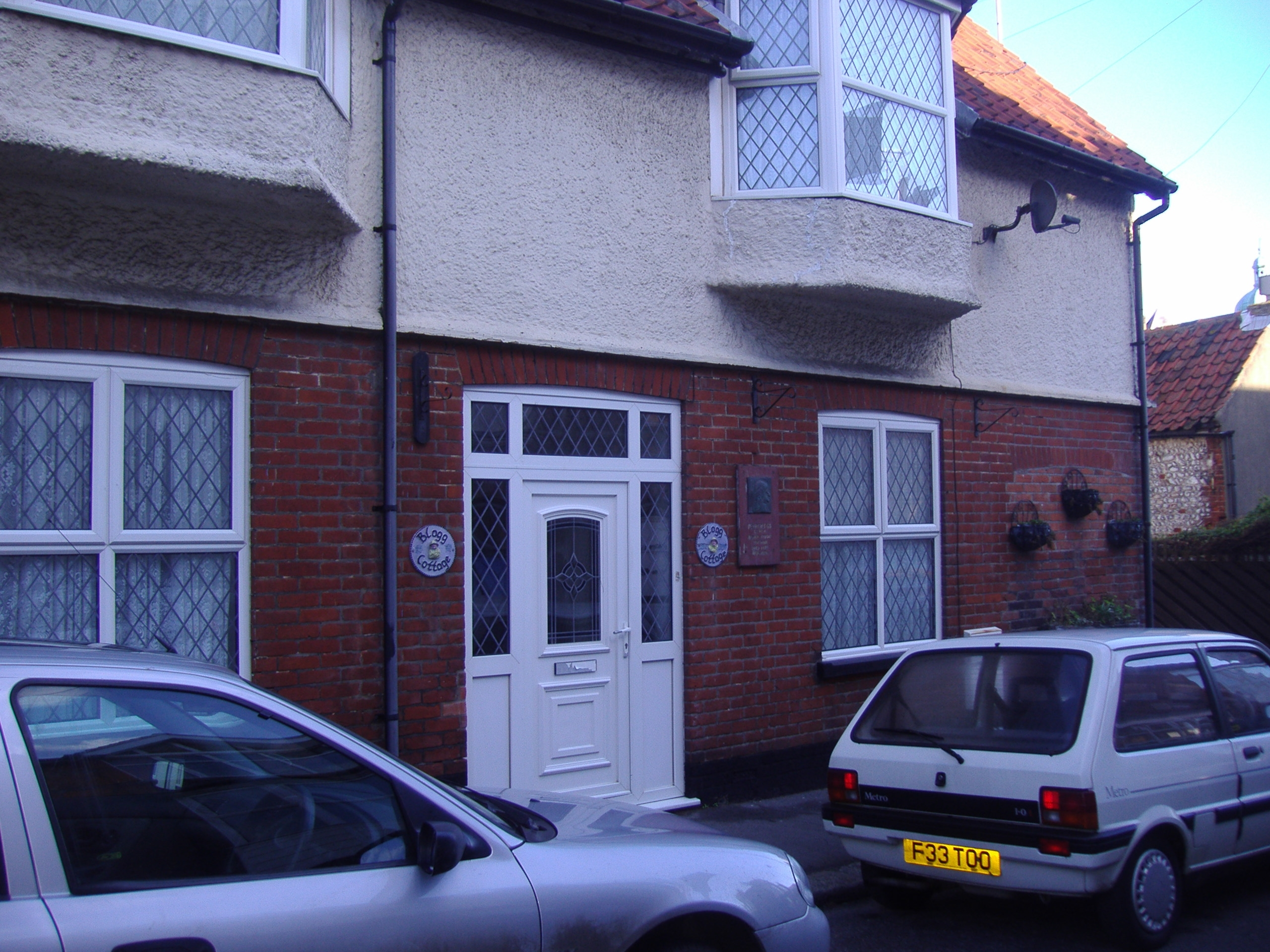
The home of Henry Blogg in Cromer

He received a Silver Medal from the RNLI in 1932 for rescuing 30 men and a dog from the steamer Monte Nevoso aground on the Haisborough Sands. The Canine Defence League awarded him its own silver medal.

In October 1939 the lifeboat went to the aid of SS Mount Ida. During the long night-time rescue the lifeboat was damaged and the No. 2 boat was required to help.

In 1941 he was awarded the BEM. At around the same time it was announced that the Empire Gallantry Medal he was awarded in 1924 was to be substituted with the George Cross which he was awarded in October that year.

== English Trader ==
The call out to the SS English Trader in 1941, aground on Hammond's Knoll off Happisburgh, nearly led to disaster when the motor lifeboat H. F. Bailey rolled onto her side, throwing five of her crew in the water. Blogg was one of them.

Still on board, crewman William H. Davies grasped the wheel and steered the lifeboat towards the men in the water. One by one they were picked up. Signalman Walter Allen would not survive long; his heart was failing. Blogg turned the lifeboat from the English Trader and headed for the nearest harbour at Great Yarmouth.

At 3 a.m. the next morning, Blogg awoke his crew, ready to try again. They slipped from the wartime harbour and were soon back at the sands. The sea had abated, and forty-four men on the English Trader, who had not expected to live through the night, were saved. Henry was given the RNLI Silver medal for that rescue, the rest of the crew receiving Bronzes, Walter Allen posthumously.

Cromer lifeboat crew, English Trader rescue
H. F. Bailey
Name	Rank
Henry G Blogg	Coxswain
John J ("Jack") Davies	Second Coxswain
Henry W ("Swank") Davies	Mechanic
James W ("Jimmy") Davies	Assistant Mechanic
Edward W ("Boy Primo") Allen	Signalman
William T ("Captain") Davies	Bowman
John J ("Young Jack") Davies, jnr	Crewman
Sidney C ("Kelly") Harrison	Crewman
Henry T ("Shrimp") Davies	Crewman
William H ("Pimpo") Davies	Crewman
Robert C ("Bob") Davies	Crewman
James R ("Dick") Davies	Crewman

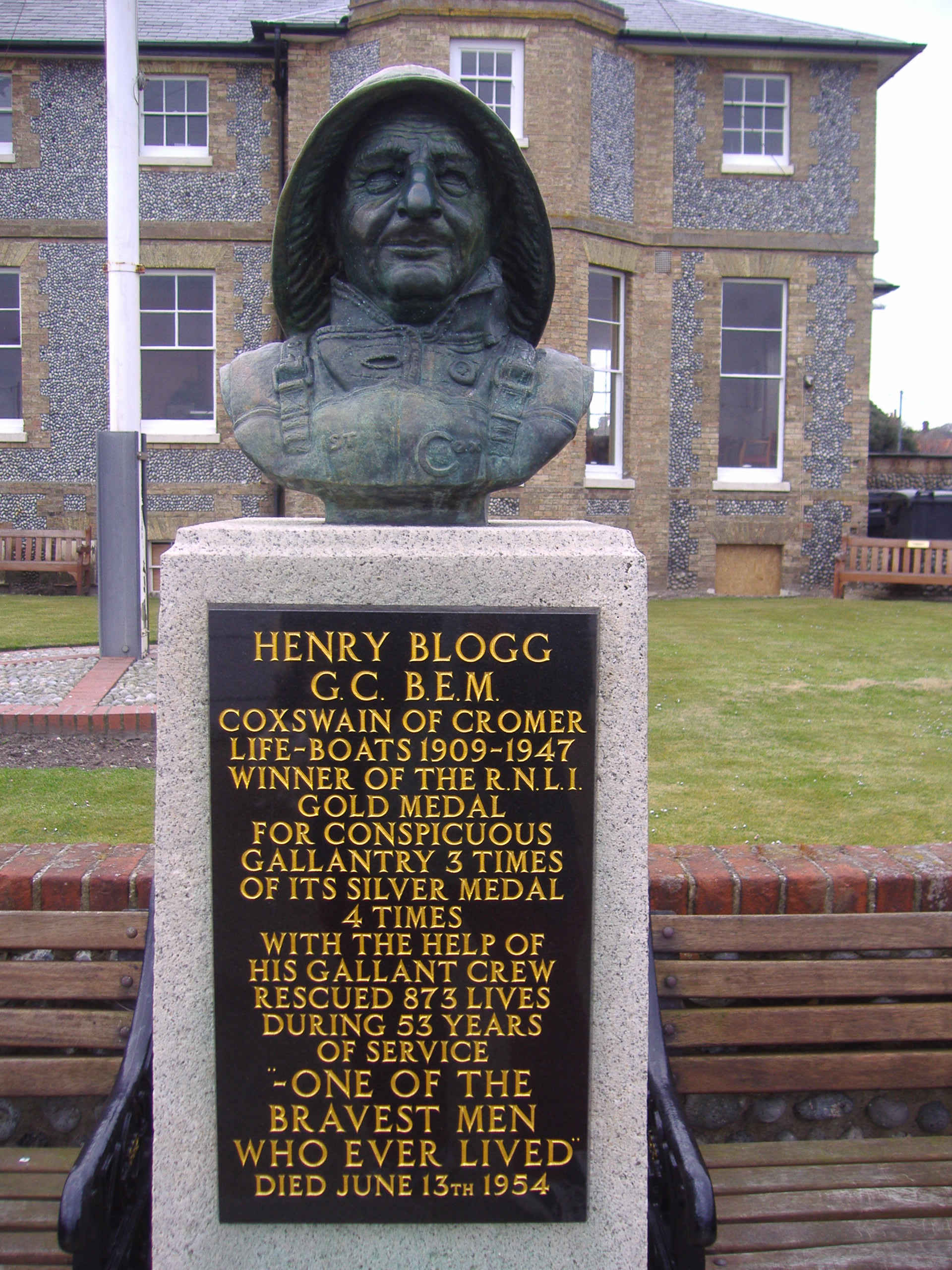
Henry Blogg's bronze bust on the cliff top in North Lodge Park, Cromer.

== Legacy ==
When Henry Blogg retired in 1947, after 53 years service and at age 71, 11 years past the usual retiring date, the new lifeboat at Cromer was named after him. He had been coxswain for 38 years of his service during which he had launched 387 times and rescued 873 people. Henry Blogg's nephew Henry "Shrimp" Davies took over as coxswain of the Cromer Lifeboat.

A museum dedicated to the memory of Henry Blogg – "the greatest of the lifeboatmen" – opened in 2006. Unveiled by Ronnie Corbett who started his stage career in Cromer, the museum is the first purpose-built RNLI museum to be opened since the Grace Darling museum opened in 1938. On 15 April 2008, the museum was successful in bidding for two watches that had been awarded to Blogg.

The RNLI lifeboat The Millie Walton (ON 840) was renamed Henry Blogg in 1947; it remained in service until 1966.

== Gallery ==
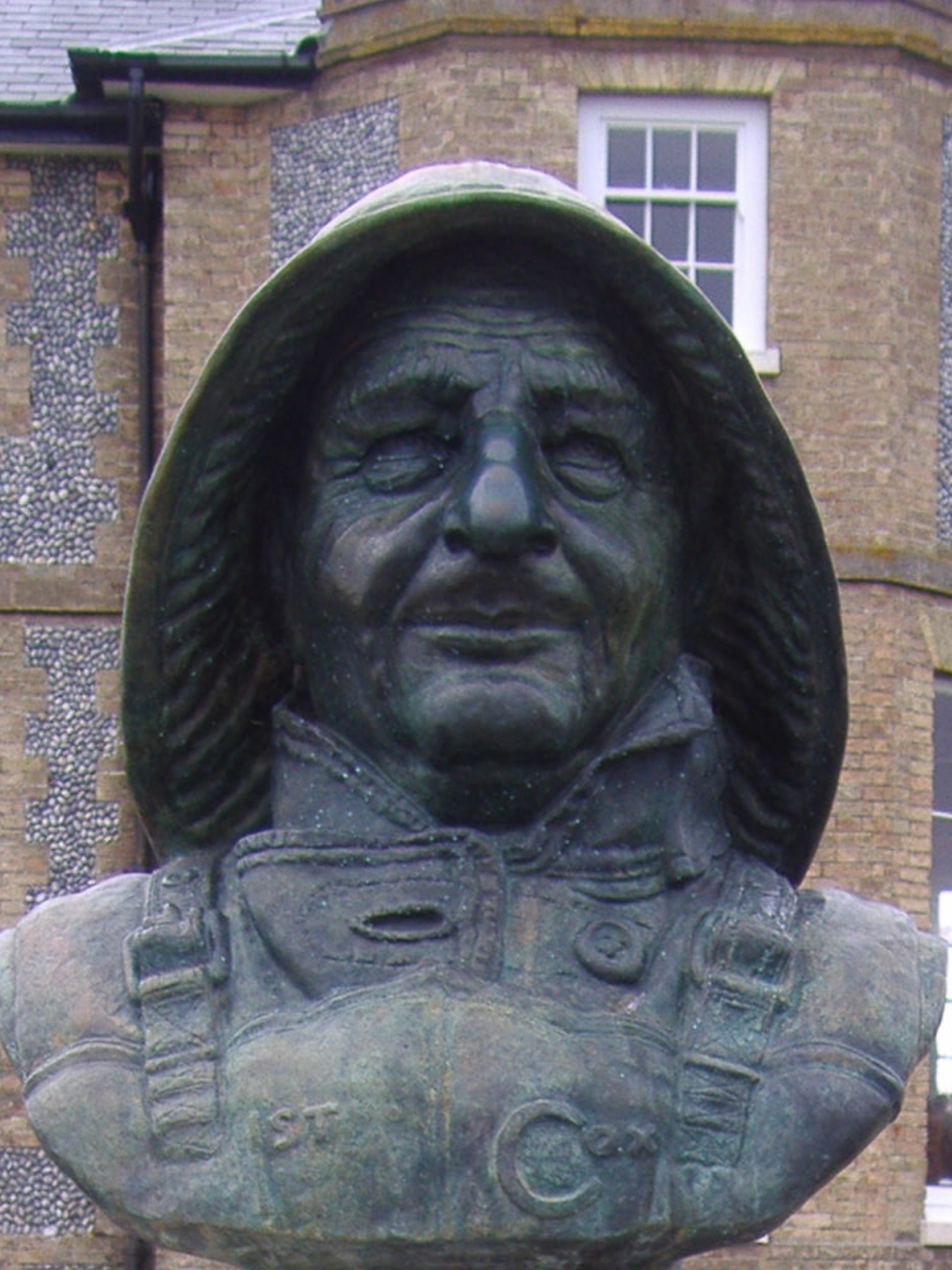
Close up of Henry Blogg's Bust.

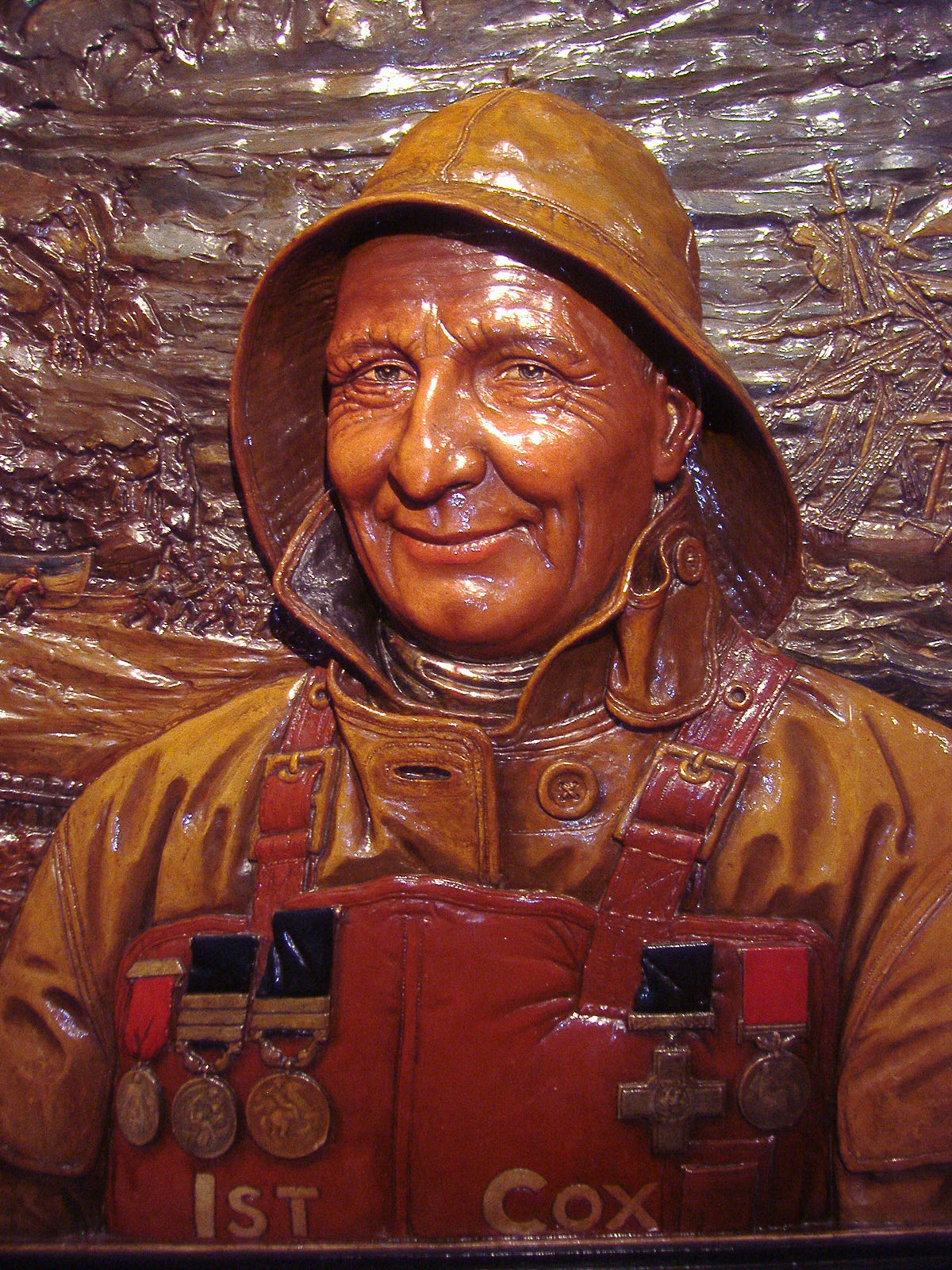
A portrait of Blogg by John Moray-Smith in the Cromer Town Museum

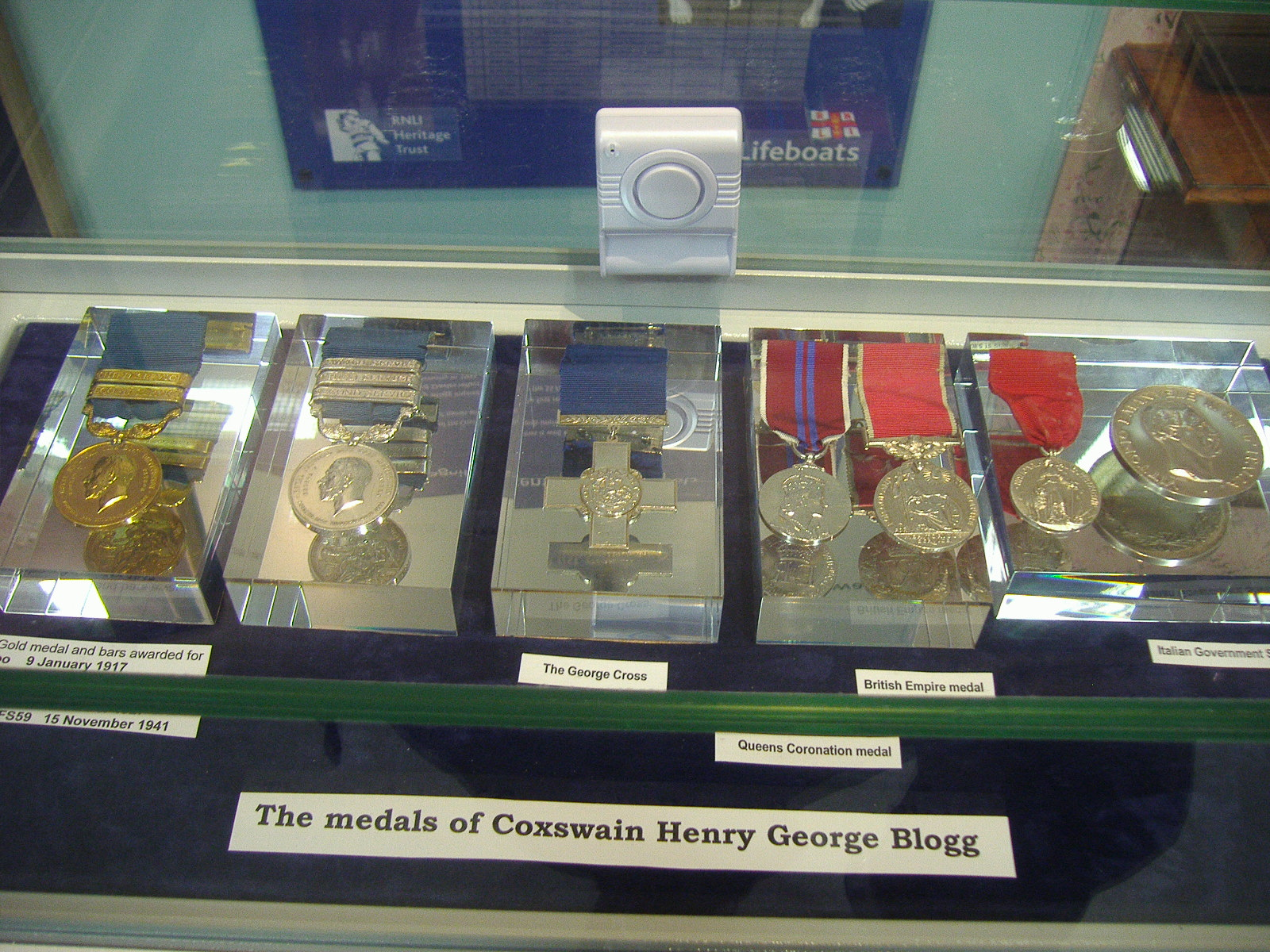
Henry Blogg's medals on display at the Lifeboat museum in Cromer

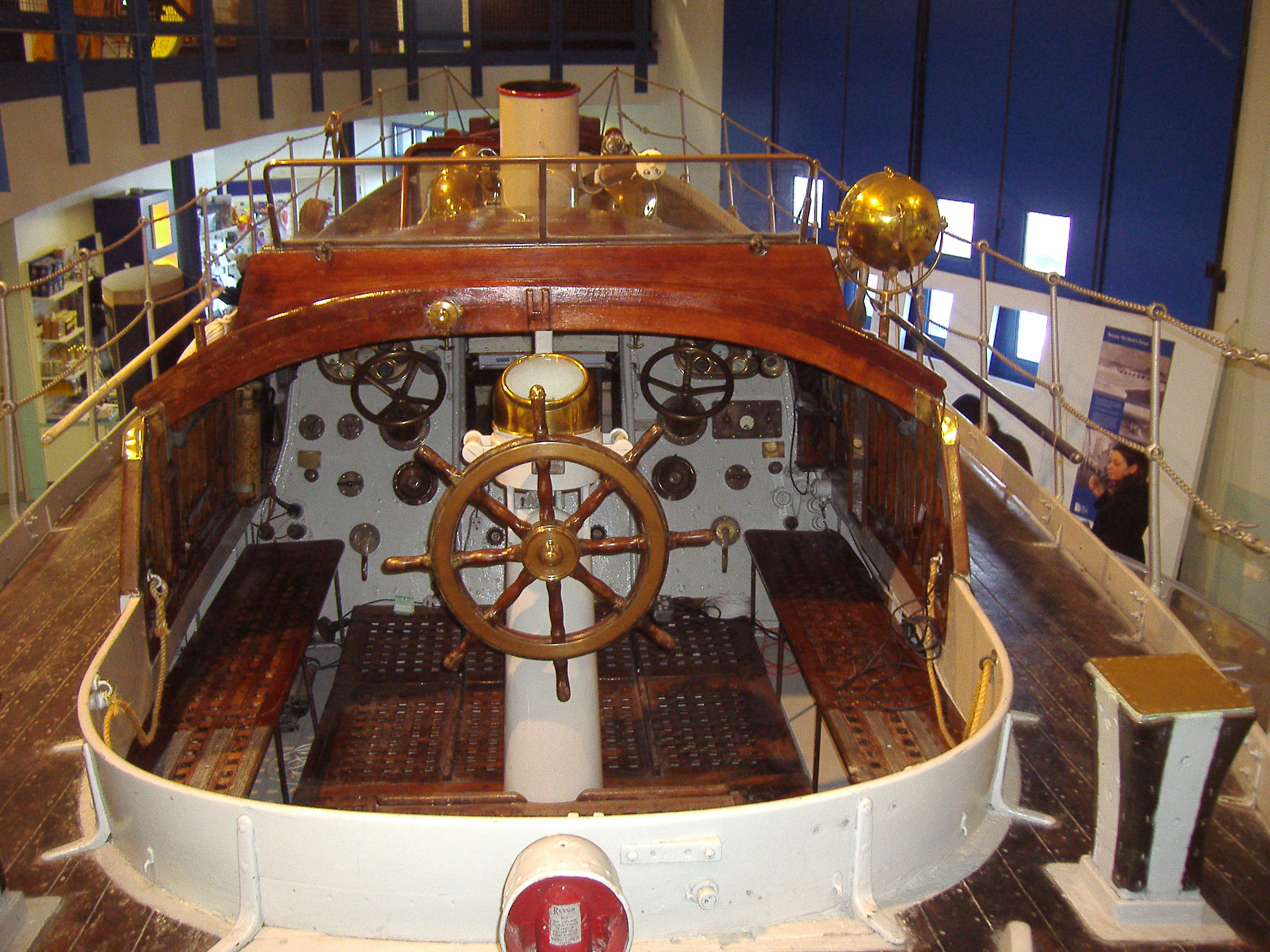
The lifeboat H F Bailey at the Lifeboat museum in Cromer

== See also ==
- SS Georgia
- SS Cantabria
- RNLB Benjamin Bond Cabbell (ON 12)
- Cromer Lifeboat Louisa Heartwell ON 495
- Cromer Lifeboat H F Bailey ON 694
