= Henry Thomas Davies =

British lifeboatman

Henry Thomas Davies BEM
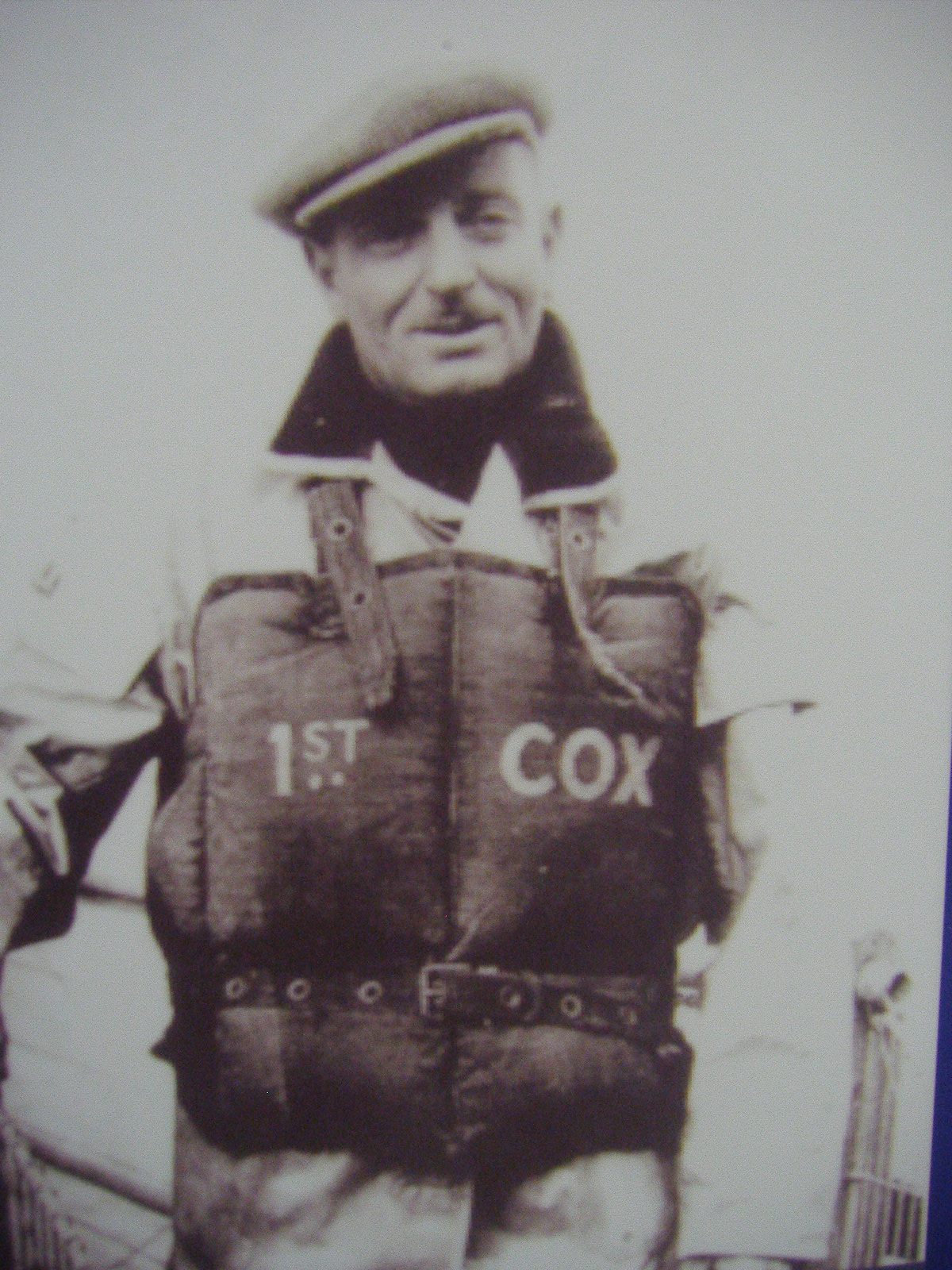
- Henry "Shrimp" Davies
- Born: 19 February 1914; Cromer, Norfolk, England
- Died: 25 June 2002 (aged 88); Cromer, Norfolk, England
- Occupations: Crab fisherman Coxswain of the Cromer lifeboat (1947–1976)
- Spouse: Kathleen Arnup
- Parent: Father: William Thomas Davies

Henry "Shrimp" Thomas Davies BEM (19 February 1914 – 25 June 2002) was a lifeboatman from Cromer on the north coast of Norfolk, England. His uncle, Henry Blogg, gave him the nickname "Shrimp" after seeing him as a tiny baby. In 1931 he joined the crew of the Cromer lifeboat H F Bailey and became coxswain in 1947, taking over from Henry Blogg. Davies retired in February 1976, after serving as coxswain of lifeboats Henry Blogg and Ruby and Arthur Reed, having been one of Cromer Lifeboat Station's longest serving coxswains.

== English Trader ==
Shrimp Davies had a near-fatal involvement in the famous rescue of the SS English Trader on 26 October 1941. At 8.15 am the Cromer lifeboat H F Bailey, crewed by twelve men including Shrimp Davies and coxswain Henry Blogg, was launched to aid the stricken ship. By 11.35 am the lifeboat had reached the site, the Hammond Knoll sandbank. The gale was at full force and three of the English Trader's crew had been swept off the foundering ship to their death. The remaining 44 crew had taken refuge in the chart room, the highest and safest point on the ship. The lifeboat made two attempts to get a line to the English Trader without any success. A further attempt at rescue resulted in a near disaster for the H F Bailey and in the death of one of her crew. Coxswain Henry Blogg had attempted to approach the stricken vessel and a wall of water hit the lifeboat on her port side which washed five of the lifeboat men, including Shrimp Davies and coxswain Blogg, overboard into the raging sea. The five men were hauled back on to the lifeboat but the signalman, Edward "Boy Primo" W. Allen after being in the water for 25 minutes fell unconscious and died a short time later. Despite these traumas, H F Bailey was able go on and rescue the crew of 44 from the English Trader, taking them to the safety of Great Yarmouth.

For his part in this rescue, Davies won the RNLI bronze medal for gallantry.

== Coxswain ==
In 1947 Henry Davies took over as coxswain of the Cromer lifeboat from his uncle, Henry Blogg. Shrimp's first significant mission as coxswain took place in July 1947. The Cromer lifeboat Henry Blogg, so named after Shrimp's uncle, was launched into storm to help a leaking French collier Francois Tixier off Sheringham. The lifeboatmen hauled a dozen crewmen to safety with a breeches buoy. Another four were pulled from the water when the collier capsized. For this Henry was awarded the Maritime Medal, France's highest award for lifesaving at sea. In 1970 Henry Davies was awarded the British Empire Medal for "maintaining the highest traditions of the lifeboat service".

== Later life ==
Davies was the subject of the ITV programme This is Your Life on 18 February 1976, the night before he retired as coxswain. After his retirement, Shrimp continued to run the family deckchair business on Cromer's east beach where he was a familiar and talkative figure. Henry Davies died in the summer of 2002 at the age of 88. Lifeboatmen from across the country attended his funeral to commemorate his 45 years of service, in which time he took part in more than 500 rescues.

== Gallery ==
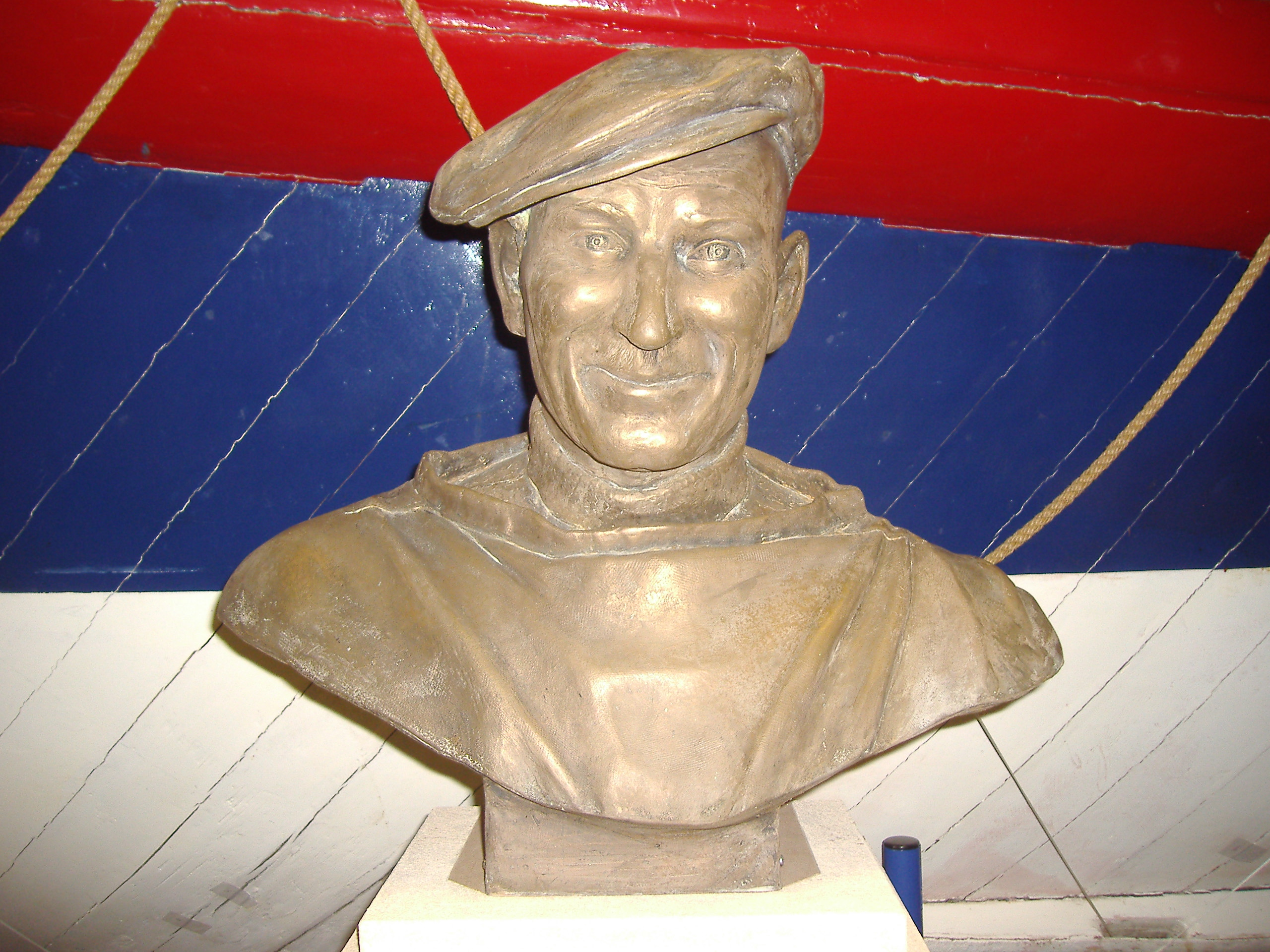
Bust of Davies in the Henry Blogg Museum in Cromer

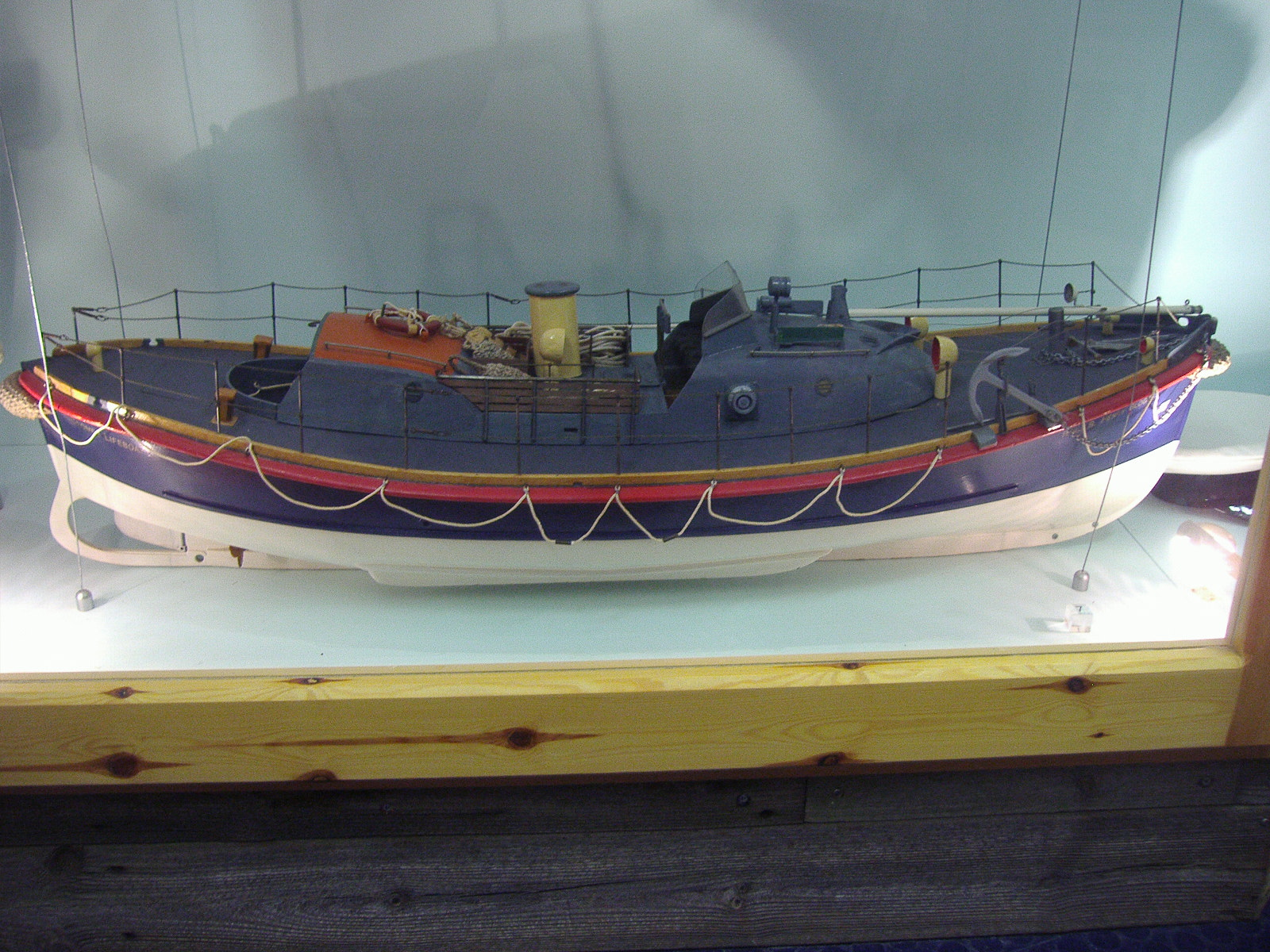
A model of the Lifeboat Henry Blogg of which Davies was coxswain

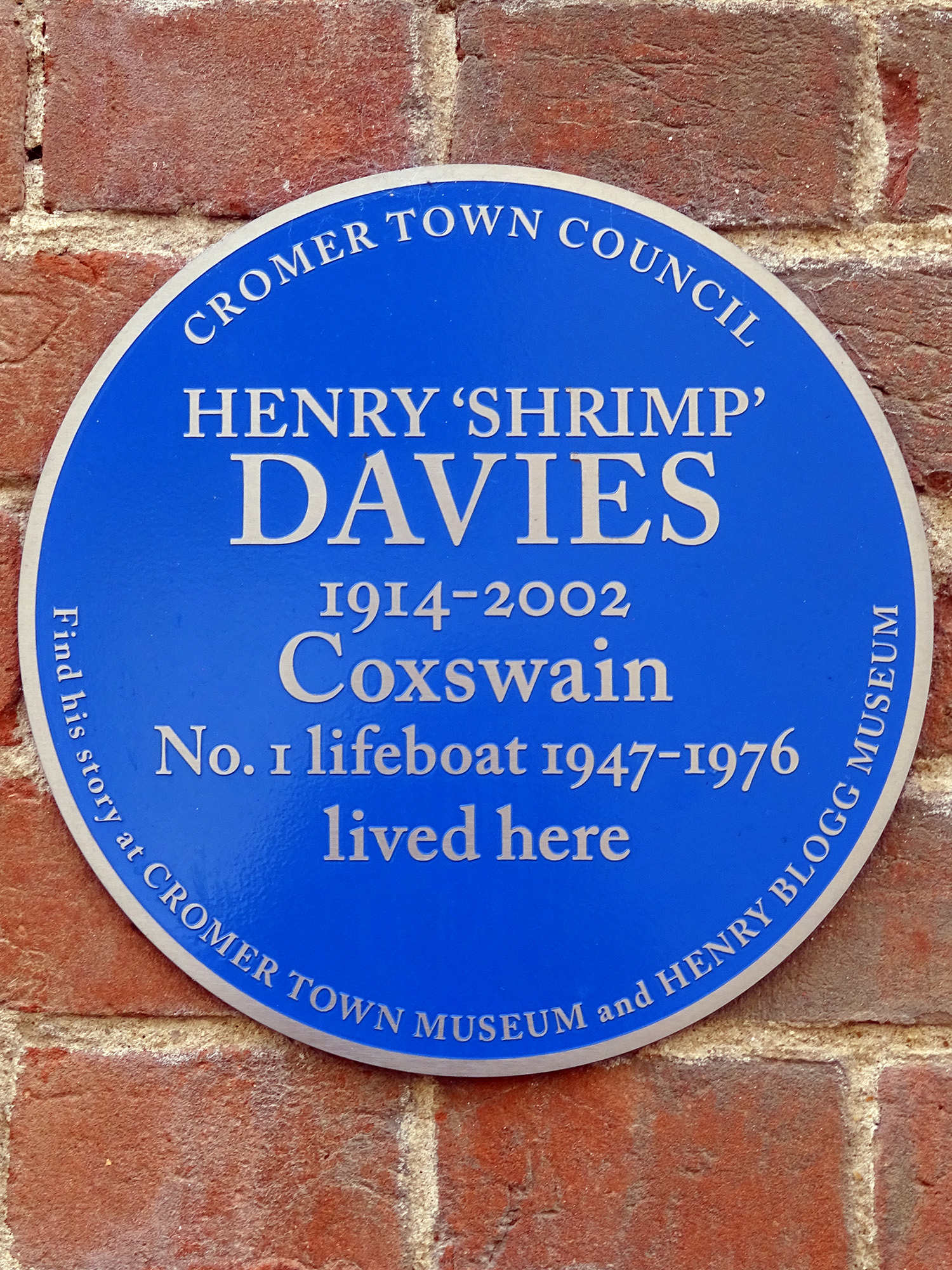
Blue plaque erected at Davies' house at New Street, Cromer

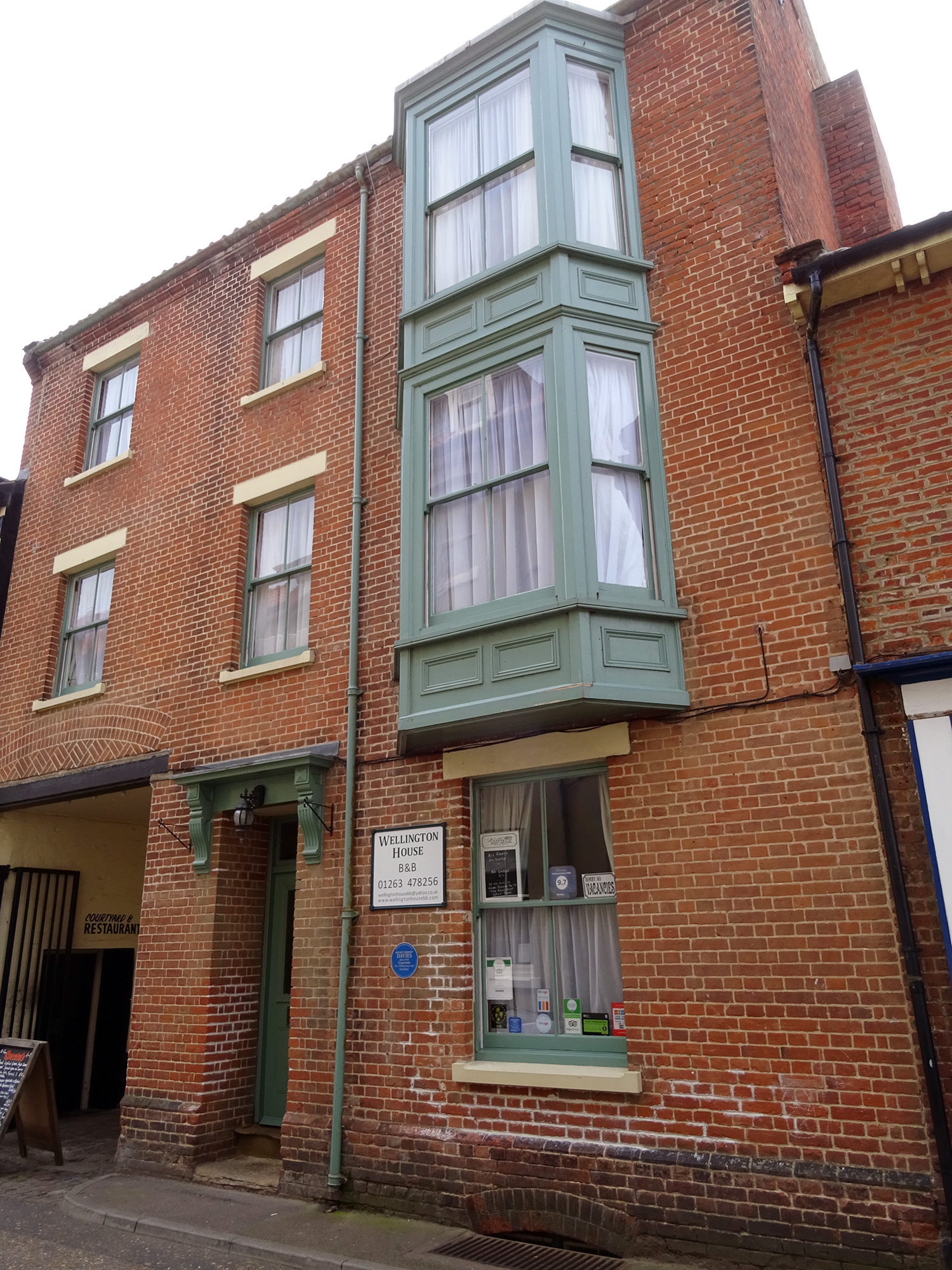
Davies' house at 5 New Street Cromer
