= RNLB Benjamin Bond Cabbell =

Pulling and sailing lifeboats

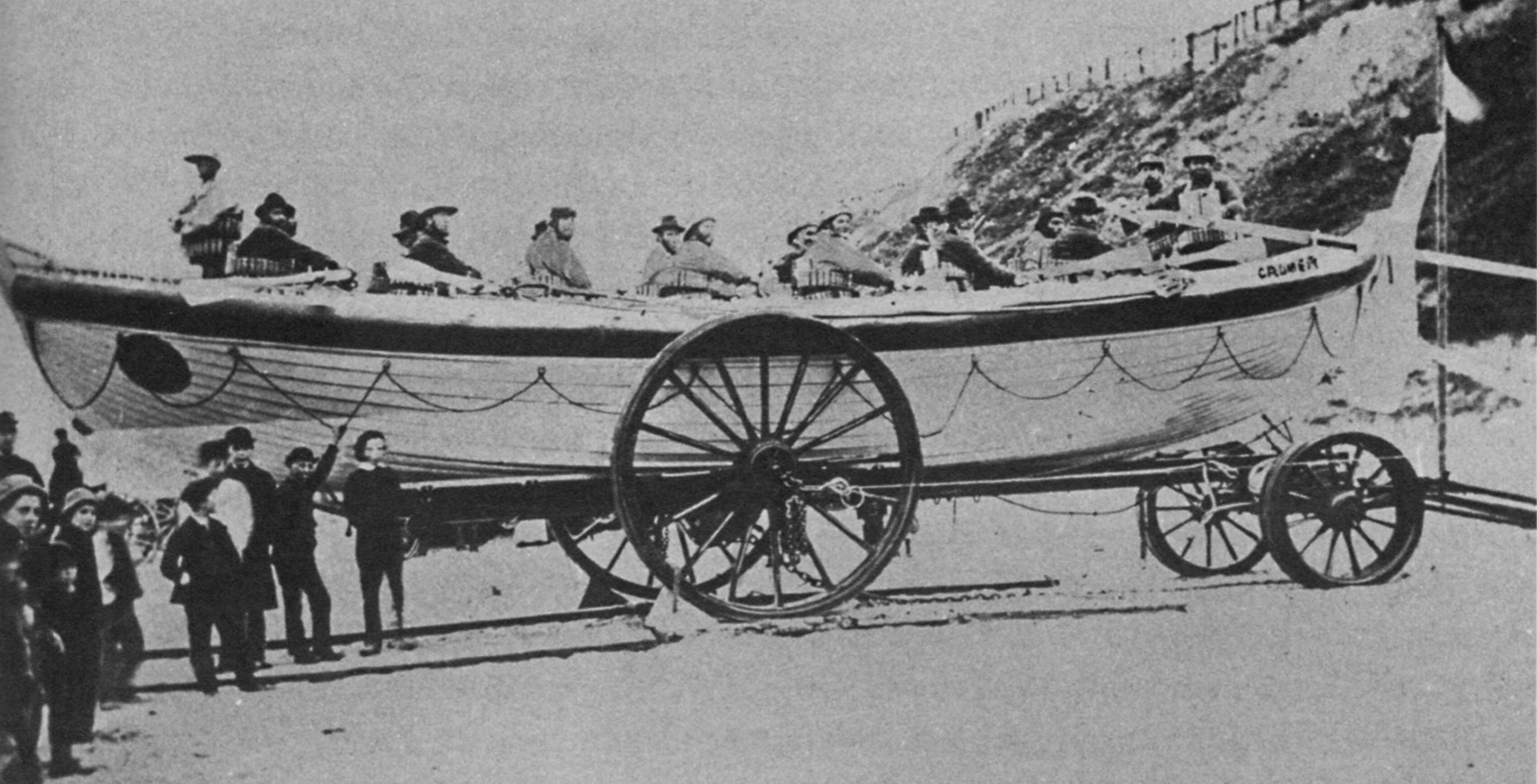
- Benjamin Bond Cabbell (ON 12)

History

British RNLI Flag
- Owner: Royal National Lifeboat Institution (RNLI)
- Builder: James Beeching & Brothers boat builders, Great Yarmouth
- Official Number: ON 12
- Donor: Legacy of Miss Ann Egdell, Alnwick, Northumberland
- Station: Cromer
- Cost: £365 3s 6d
- Launched: 1884
- Christened: 29 September 1884 by Mrs Bond Cabbell
- In service: September 1884 to September 1902

General characteristics
- Type: Cromer non self-righter
- Displacement: 30 tons
- Length: 35 ft (11 m) overall
- Beam: 10 ft 6 in (3.20 m)
- Depth: 4 ft (1.2 m)
- Installed power: Dipping Lug sail
- Propulsion: Fourteen oars double banked

RNLB Benjamin Bond Cabbell (ON 12) was a 35-foot-long (11 m) Cromer-class non-self-righting lifeboat, stationed at Cromer Lifeboat Station in the English county of Norfolk from September 1884 until September 1902.

== History ==
The Benjamin Bond Cabbell (ON 12) was the fifth lifeboat to be stationed at the Norfolk town of Cromer, and the second lifeboat to bear the name Benjamin Bond Cabbell.

The events of Thursday 4 October 1883 highlighted the need for a different design of lifeboat at Cromer. The schooner Alpha of Sunderland, bound for Whitstable with a cargo of coal, was seen flying signals of distress. In gale-force conditions, the 34 feet (10 m) 10-oared self-righting lifeboat Benjamin Bond Cabbell, on station since 1868, could make no progress after launch, and returned to shore. The Alpha was subsequently driven ashore, her crew of five eventually rescued by the Rocket Brigade.

With the lifeboat abandoned on the shore, and the lifeboat men of Cromer complaining that it was too heavy to row against a strong headwind with the number of oars, the local committee arranged a number of meetings, held with the RNLI Chief Inspector of Lifeboats, Capt. the Hon H.W. Chetwynd, RN, the Institution surveyor Mr Prowse, and the crew of the Cromer Lifeboat. At the meetings the lifeboat men were asked what their preferences were, when considering designs for the new lifeboat. The local men who were mainly fishermen expressed a desire for a new boat to be on the lines of the lifeboat which had been stationed there before 1858. These suggestions by local men, Mr James Davis, Mr James Mayes and Mr Thomas Blogg were very similar to the North-Country lifeboats. By 27 November 1883, Mr Prowse had agreed a design with the local fisherman, and an order was placed with James Beeching boat builders, of Great Yarmouth.

Further details of the lifeboat construction can be found here:–

- Cromer-class lifeboat

== Arrival and Naming Ceremony ==
The Benjamin Bond Cabbell (ON 12) arrived in Cromer on Thursday 25 September 1884, having been towed there from the manufacturer in Great Yarmouth by tugboat. The old lifeboat was hauled to the railway station and up the gangway, an operation requiring the use of 19 horses.

A grand ceremony was held on Monday 29 September 1884, for the inauguration and official launch of the new lifeboat. Flags and bunting adorned the Coastguard-station and lifeboat house. Schools were give a half-holiday, and business was suspended. Just before 13:00, the lifeboat was taken down to the beach, for photographs by Mr. T. Mack of Cromer, and by Mr. George Newman of the Norwich Photographic Company.

A large crowd of spectators lined the cliffs and beach, and proceedings commenced at 14:00, with music provided by the Cromer band. Sir T. Fowell Buxton, Bt. made the first address, followed by Edward Birkbeck, chairman of the Institution, who acknowledged that although 257 of the 279 lifeboats of the Institution were of the 'Self-righting' type, the Institution fully supported those crews who chose a different boat which they thought most suited for their coast. Mr Birkbeck asked Sir Fowell Buxton to present the lifeboat into the care of the Cromer Lifeboat Station, which was followed by prayers from the Rev F. Fitch of Cromer.

The lifeboat was one of two funded from the legacy of the late Miss Ann Egdell of Alnwick. She had not left any instruction regarding the name, so it was decided the boat should carry the name of the previous Cromer lifeboat, generously given by the late Mr Benjamin Bond Cabbell. Mrs Bond Cabbell then stepped forward and breaking a bottle of claret over the boat, named the boat Benjamin Bond-Cabbell. The boat was then launched from the lifeboats carriage, whilst the Cromer band played Rule, Britannia! and the church bells rang.

== Service ==
The Benjamin Bond Cabbell was launched to only thirteen times during her service at Cromer, saving twenty six lives in the process. Her first service took place on 28 January 1888. Benjamin Bond Cabbell was launched at 11:15 am to the brigantine Jane Maria of London which was bound from Hartlepool for Greenwich with a cargo of coal. The crew of seven were taken on board the Benjamin Bond Cabbell and landed at Cromer.

=== Henry Blogg ===
On 28 December 1894 an eighteen-year-old boy joined the crew of the Benjamin Bond Cabbell for the first time. His name was Henry George Blogg and he would go on to be referred to as "the greatest of the lifeboatmen". Henry Blogg GC BEM (6 February 1876 – 13 June 1954) took part in his first service to the schooner Fair City of Gloucester. She had lost her mast and rigging in severe weather. The lifeboat stayed with her through the night escorting her part way to shore before her crew were taken off by the Sea Palling Lifeboat Hearts of Oak ON351. The schooner then broke into pieces and sank

=== Last service ===
Her final service was to the steamship Celerity of Great Yarmouth on 17 February 1901. The Celerity was bound from Rochester to Leith carrying a cargo of cement when she began shipping water and her fires had to be extinguished. After standing by her all night the lifeboat then escorted the vessel to Great Yarmouth. The Benjamin Bond Cabbell was withdrawn from service after the RNLI deemed she was unfit for further service. She was replaced by RNLB Louisa Heartwell (ON 495) in 1902.

== Service and rescues ==
Date	Casualty	Lives saved
1888
28 January	Schooner Jane Maria of London	7
1893
18 November	Fishing boat from Overstrand	5
18 November	Fishing boat from Runton	3
1894
26 October	Five fishing boats, landed 7	
28 December	Schooner Fair City, of Gloucester, stood by and gave help	
1897
3 December	Ketch Hero, of Goole	4
1901
17 February	Steamship Celerity of Great Yarmouth, saved vessel	7
