= Cromer-class lifeboat =

Pulling and sailing lifeboats

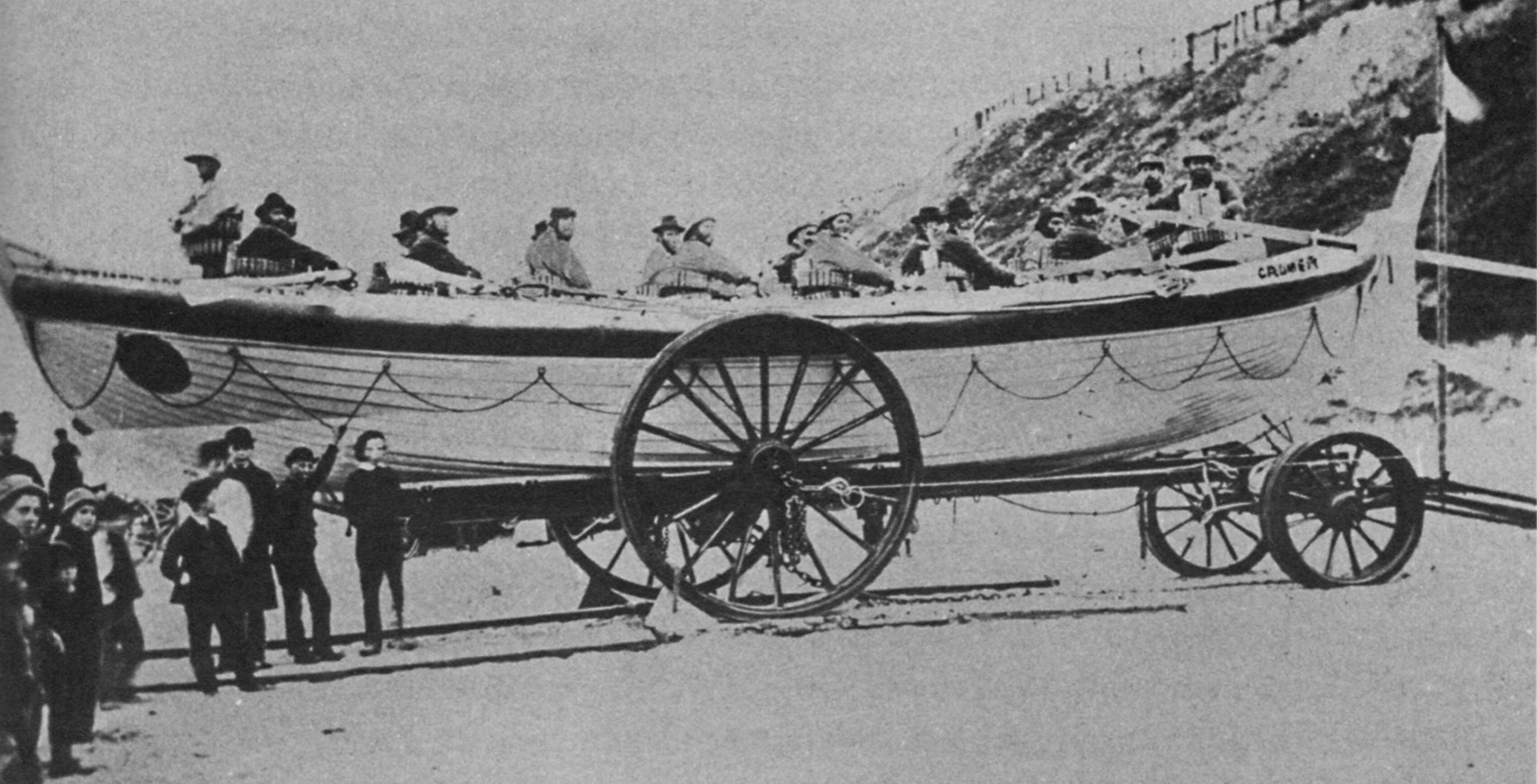
- Cromer-class lifeboat Benjamin Bond Cabell (ON 12)

Class overview
- Builders: James Beeching of Great Yarmouth
- Operators: Royal National Lifeboat Institution
- Built: 1884–1895
- In service: 1884–1913
- Completed: 3
- Retired: 3

General characteristics
- Type: Pulling and sailing lifeboats
- Length: 35 ft 0 in (10.67 m) to 35 ft 3 in (10.74 m)
- Beam: 10 ft 0 in (3.05 m) to 10 ft 3 in (3.12 m)
- Propulsion: Oars and Sails
- Crew: 14

Cromer-class lifeboats were a small group of just three 'Pulling and Sailing' (P&S) lifeboats, constructed by James Beeching of Great Yarmouth between 1884 and 1895. The production of the boat was initially the result of the request of the Cromer lifeboat men, who wished to be supplied with a new boat, similar in design to their previous 'North Country' lifeboat, which had been retired in 1858.

== History ==
On the afternoon of Thursday 4 October 1883, the schooner Alpha of Sunderland, bound for Whitstable with a cargo of coal, was observed to the north-west off Cromer, flying signals of distress. In gale-force conditions, the 34 feet (10 m) 10-oared self-righting lifeboat Benjamin Bond Cabbell could make no progress after launch, and returned to shore. The Alpha was subsequently driven ashore, her crew of five eventually rescued by the Rocket Brigade.

On Monday 8 October, it was later reported that the lifeboat still lay on the shore where she had been left, the lifeboat men of Cromer being extremely dissatisfied with the boat, complaining that it was too heavy to row against a strong headwind with the number of oars, after the futile attempts to row to the Alpha.

The local branch wasted no time, and a meeting was arranged for that same Monday evening, at the Fisherman's room, attended by the Chief Inspector of Lifeboats, Capt. The Hon. H. W. Chetwynd, RN. Discussions recommenced the following day, examining the benefits and disadvantages of the self-righting lifeboats as preferred by the Institution, but with Capt. Chetwynd acknowledging that the existing boat was unsuitable for the location.

However, after much discussion by the committee and local fishermen, and a visit by three of the branch committee to see various lifeboats in London, it was agreed that the new boat would be based on an updated design of the old 'North Country' lifeboat, which operated at Cromer between 1830 and 1858. The crew much preferred a wide stable boat with more oars (14), and therefore more power.

The new lifeboat arrived at Cromer on Thursday 25 September 1884, towed there by tugboat from Great Yarmouth. The expense of the new lifeboat, carriage and equipment, was defrayed from a legacy left to the Institution by the late Miss Ann Egdell, of Alnwick. As Miss Egdell did not direct that the boat should bear any special name, it was decided to give to the new Cromer lifeboat the name borne by its predecessor, Benjamin Bond Cabell (ON 12). A service of dedication and naming ceremony took place at 14:00 on Monday 29 September 1884.

Just two more Cromer-class lifeboats were constructed, the first being seven years later, supplied to Blakeney, and a second one provided to Wells-next-the-Sea, both stations also sitting on the north coast of Norfolk.

== Design ==
The new lifeboat hull was constructed by James Beeching of Great Yarmouth using the clench method fixed with copper fastenings. The keel was 4 inches (100 mm) deep and 5 inches (130 mm) wide, with an iron keel plate and a belt of cork. She was 35-foot-long (11 m) with a breadth of 10 feet 6 inches (3.20 m). The inside depth was 4 feet (1.2 m). There were fourteen oars which were double banked and she was also equipped with a dipping lug sail. The lifeboat would be steered by either a rudder or sweep oars.

Benjamin Bond Cabbell had a watertight deck, with copper tubes and self-acting valves to release the water, and portable airtight cases round the sides of the boat between the deck and the thwarts. Cork-packed air-cases were placed under the deck in the wings of the lifeboat. These cases weighed 4.5 tons and drew 18 inches (460 mm) of water clear of ballast. The boat had a relatively light construction with a high bow and a raking stem. The keel was curved, typical of the north country-designed lifeboats first built in the late eighteenth century. The water ballast tanks had ten relieving valves and the rudder was retractable to prevent it being damaged when beach launched or during the recovery procedure.

A carriage was provided for launching and transportation.

== Fleet ==
ON (Note: ON is the RNLI's Official Number of the boat.)	Name	Built	In Service	Station	Comments
12	Benjamin Bond Cabell	1884	1884–1902	Cromer	(Note: 35 ft (11 m) x 10 ft (3.0 m) (14-oared) Cromer-class (P&S) lifeboat, legacy of Miss Ann Edgell of Alnwick, costing £365.) Sold 1902. Renamed Lorna Doone, last reported as a houseboat at Great Yarmouth, 1903.
318	Zaccheus Burroughes	1891	1891–1908	Blakeney	(Note: 35 ft 3 in (10.74 m) x 10 ft 3 in (3.12 m) (14-oared) Cromer-class (P&S) lifeboat, legacy of Miss E. Burroughes of Norwood, London, costing £426.) Sold 1908. Scrapped at Blakeney in 1935.
375	Baltic	1895	1895–1913	Wells-next-the-Sea	(Note: 35 ft 3 in (10.74 m) x 10 ft 3 in (3.12 m) (14-oared) Cromer-class (P&S) lifeboat, gift of the Baltic Exchange LB fund, costing £450.) Condemned and Sold 1913. Renamed Marvin, last reported at Wells-next-the-Sea, 1913.

== See also ==
- List of RNLI stations
- List of former RNLI stations
- Royal National Lifeboat Institution lifeboats
