= RNLB Henry Blogg =

RNLB Henry Blogg (ON 840)
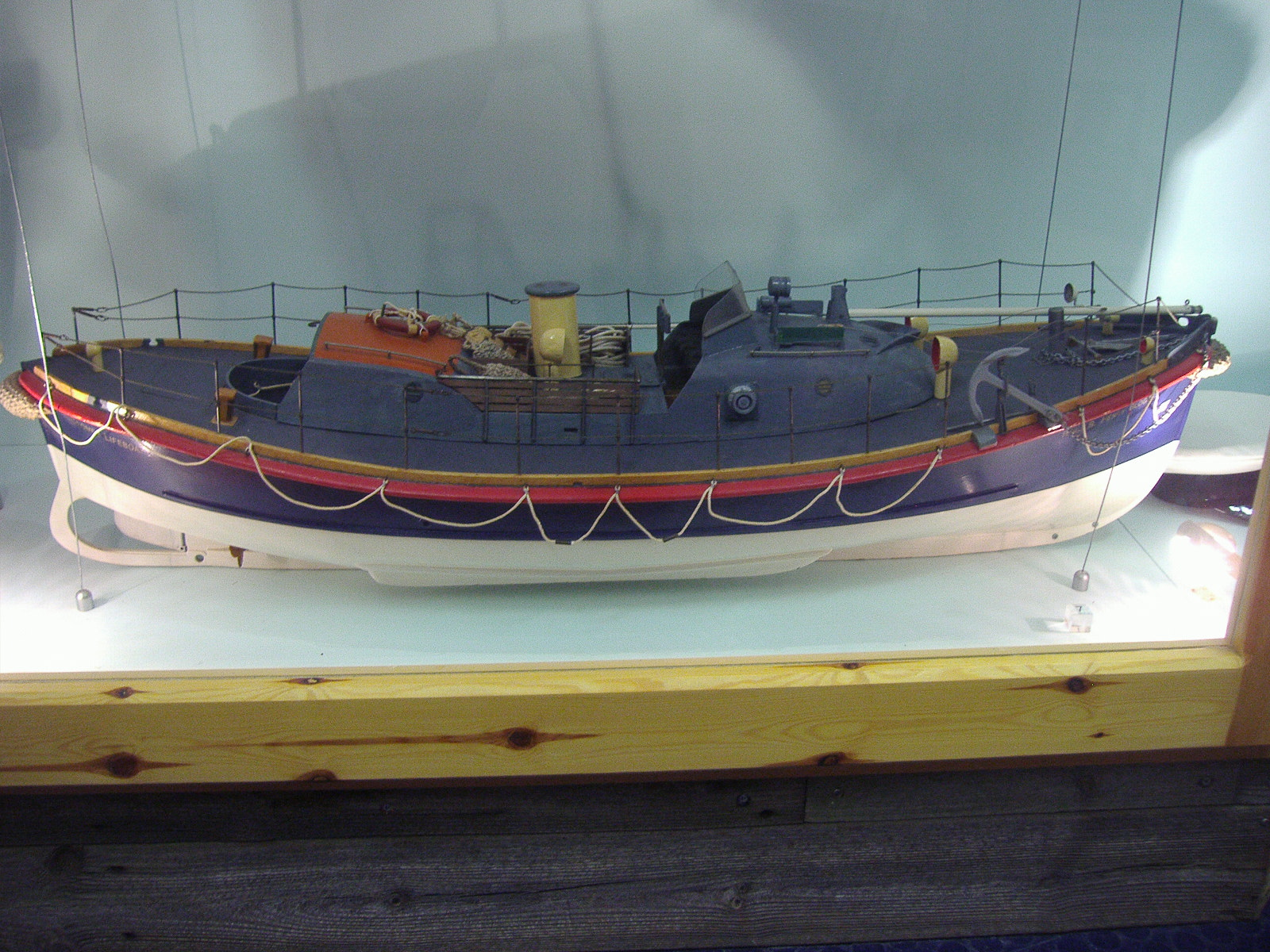
- Model of the Millie Walton/Henry Blogg (ON840)

History

Cromer Lifeboat station
- Name: Millie Walton
- Namesake: Donor
- Owner: Royal National Lifeboat Institution (RNLI)
- Builder: Sussex Yacht Company Shoreham
- Cost: £15,241 17s 6d
- Laid down: 1945
- Christened: 7 August 1948 by Sir John Cunningham
- In service: 20 December 1945
- Renamed: 1948
- Official Number: ON 840
- Donor: Legacy of Mrs M E Walton of Derby.
- Station: Cromer

Cromer Lifeboat station
- Name: Henry Blogg
- Namesake: Henry Blogg
- Out of service: 1966

Reserve fleet
- Out of service: 1976
- Fate: Sold in April 1977 for £5,500

General characteristics
- Type: Watson-class lifeboat
- Length: 46 ft 9 in (14.25 m) overall
- Beam: 12 ft 9 in (3.89 m)
- Installed power: 40 bhp (30 kW)
- Propulsion: Twin Ferry VE4 Diesel engines
- Speed: 8.22 knots (15.22 km/h)

RNLB Henry Blogg (ON 840), formerly the Millie Walton, was the eighteenth lifeboat to be stationed at Cromer Lifeboat Station in Norfolk.

The Millie Walton entered service at Cromer in 1945. In 1948 she was renamed Henry Blogg after Henry Blogg who had been coxwain since 1909. Henry Blogg was damaged while launching on service in April 1966, and never returned to Cromer. After repairs she entered the Reserve fleet serving until 1976.

== History ==
In 1945 after 10 years service which included busy service through the second world war H F Bailey (ON 777) was replaced with a new No 1 lifeboat in December 1945 named The Millie Walton (ON 840). This lifeboat had originally been destined for Douglas on the Isle of Man and had only been sent to Cromer for evaluation. Millie Walton was a Watson-class lifeboat but had a new midship steering position which the Cromer crew found much to their liking and so after request from the Cromer crew she remained at Cromer. In 1948 Millie Walton was renamed Henry Blogg in homage to Cromer's famous lifeboat man Henry Blogg who had been the coxswain at Cromer from 1909 to 1947, retiring after 53 years service with the service and he was the holder of the most awards by the RNLI.

Henry Blogg made his last voyage on the Millie Walton under the new coxswain Henry "Shrimp" Davies on 4 September 1948 at the age of 71. The call was to the rescue of the steam trawler Balmoral and 11 lives were saved.

== Notable rescues ==
=== Francois Tixier ===
In heavy seas on 8 July 1948 the French steamer Francois Tixier Bound from Goole to the French inland port of Rouen, got into difficulties of the north Norfolk coast four miles (6 km) off Sheringham. The steamer was laden with a cargo of coal and in worsening gale she capsized. With the Sheringham lifeboat undergoing a refit at Oulton Broad, Henry Blogg was launched to the steamer's aid and stood by. With the Francois Tixier heavily listing on the port the lifeboat went alongside but the captain and his crew refused to leave the stricken vessel. Despite the attempts by the crew to secure the cargo, it shifted further to port. With their failed attempts to steady the vessel the captain and crew agreed to leave their ship. One crew man jumped into the water and was rescued; another reached the lifeboat by rope passed between the boats. Using a breeches buoy, eight more of the crew were rescued. After the eleventh crewman was rescued using the breeches buoy the stricken steamer rolled over and began to sink. The last five remaining crew scrambled on to the stern and as the steamer slipped below the waves they scrambled on to a raft and were picked up by the lifeboat shortly after. The sixteen rescued French seaman were landed at Great Yarmouth by the Henry Blogg. In recognition of their efforts Coxswain Henry Davies and his crew were presented with awards by the French government.

=== Sheringham lifeboat Forester's Centenary ===
On 31 May 1958 Henry Blogg took part in an unusual rescue when she was called to aid the Sheringham lifeboat Forester's Centenary. This service began with a call at 9.50am to the Sheringham honorary secretary from the Trinity House Superintendent of Great Yarmouth requesting that a sick man be taken off the Dudgeon Light-vessel on the Dudgeon Shoals. At 10.15am the Sheringham lifeboat Forester's Centenary was launched with a doctor on board and she reached the light-vessel by 1.10pm. The doctor went aboard the light-vessel and dispensed a sedative to the sick man and he was then strapped to a stretcher and transferred to the Forester's Centenary. The lifeboat then set off on the return journey to her station. Nine miles north-east from home at around 4.40pm the Forester's Centenary was in trouble when the skew gear which drove the lifeboat's oil and water pumps broke down. Henry Blogg was called out and had to take the Sheringham lifeboat in tow. Both boats arrived back at the Sheringham station at 7.00pm and the sick man was taken to hospital.

== Service and rescues ==
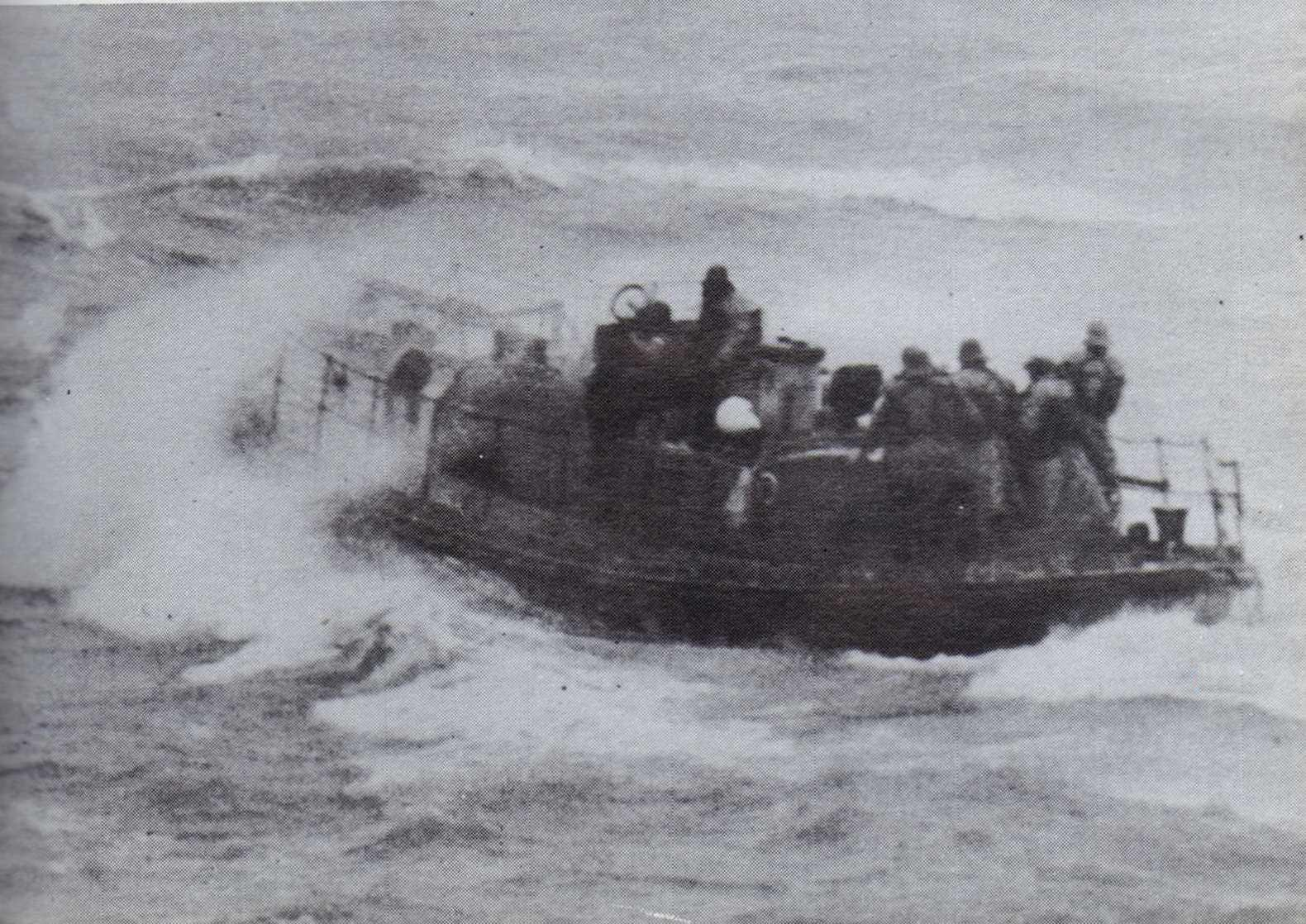
Henry Blogg puts to sea

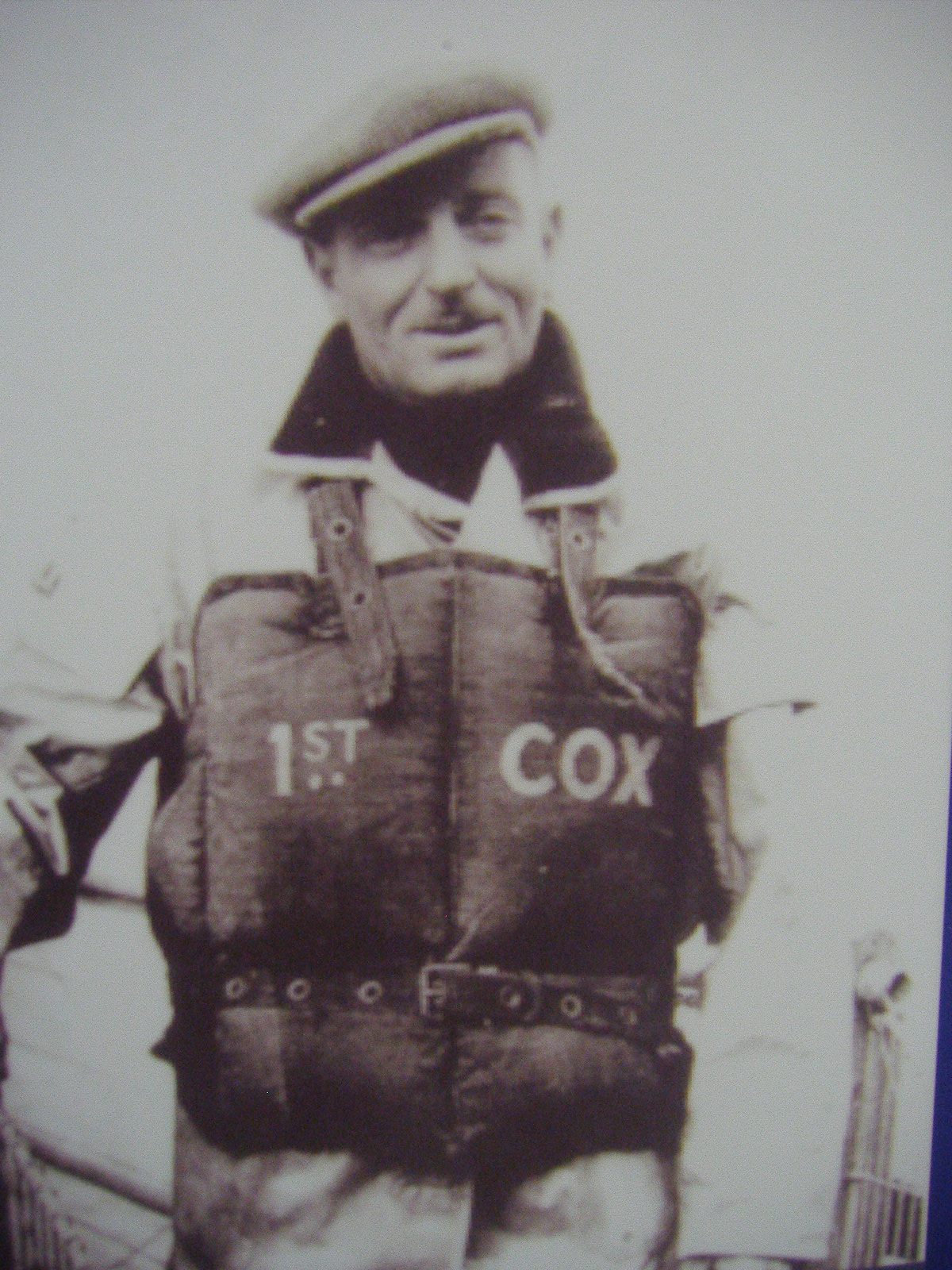
Coxswain of Henry Blogg ON 840, Henry "Shrimp" Davies

Rescues from Cromer as Millie Walton and Henry Blogg
Date	Casualty	Lives Saved
7 March 1946	Steamship Corcrest of London, assisted to save vessel	22
4 January 1947	Steam trawler Balmoral of Grimsby, gave help and saved	11
23 April 1947	Motor Yacht Switha of Inverness, gave help	
8 July 1947	Motor vessel Francois Tixier of Dunkirk, saved	16
7 August 1947	Rubber dinghy, saved dinghy	1
25–31 August 1947	Steamship Monte Nuria of Bilbao, stood by and gave help	
2 September 1948	Rubber Dinghy, saved dinghy	1
10 December 1948	Motor trawler Georges Langanay of Fecamp, assisted to save vessel	19
20–21 December 1948	Motor vessel Bosphorus of Oslo, assisted to save vessel	37
4 October 1949	Yacht Marjellen, gave help	
19 November 1949	Steamship Suntrap of London, Landed an injured man	
21 November 1950	Barge Thyra of Rochester, gave help	
9 January 1951	Cabin cruiser Dimcyl of Lowestoft, gave help	
24 July 1952	Gloster Meteor aeroplane, gave help	
1 August 1952	Motor Yacht Zippalong of Boston, gave help	
23 November 1952	Steamship Grove Hill of Middlesbrough, gave help	
11 June 1953	Sea Cadet Motor Vessel Norfolk of Goole, saved vessel	16
2 October 1954	Cromer Light vessel, Landed a sick man, saving	1
15 October 1954	Fishing boat Why Worry of Cromer, saved boat	2
19 February 1955	Bathers with rubber tyre, saved	3
19 February 1956	Steamship Colchester of London, landed a body	
10 August 1956	Yacht Ambida of Hull, saved yacht	7
9 September 1957	Sailing dinghy, saved dinghy	
23–24 September 1957	Fishing boat Britannia of Cromer, saved boat	2
26 October 1957	Trawler John Willment of Lowestoft, took out doctor	
31 May 1958	RNLB Forester's Centenary of Sheringham, gave help	
27 August 1958	Yacht Wima of Rochester, gave help	
17 August 1959	Yacht, saved yacht	2
5 September 1959	Motor Launch Gay Crusader of London, saved boat	8
31 December 1959	Aircraft, Landed a body from motor vessel Broughty of Dundee	
11 July 1960	Steam trawler Craddock of Grimsby, gave help	
3 August 1960	Rubber mattress, saved	1
16 February 1961	Haisborough Light-vessel, gave help	
16 February 1961	Steam tanker Wave Chief of London, gave help	
8 March 1961	Motor vessel Corstan of London, landed a sick man	
29 May 1962	Cabin cruiser Mayfly saved cruiser	5
23 September 1962	Yacht Elizabeth Ann, saved yacht	4
2 November 1962	HM Survey vessel Scott, Landed a sick man	
24 November 1962	Motor vessel Viscount of Groningen, gave help	
9 April 1963	Haisborough Light-vessel, landed sick man	
12 May 1963	Sailing dinghy, saved dinghy	1
11 June 1963	Motor vessel Warwickbrook of London, put a doctor aboard	
23 December 1963	Motor fishing boat Four Brothers of Lowestoft, gave help	
11 March 1964	Motor vessel Joika of Oslo. Gave help	
5 July 1964	Yacht Sally Brown of Boston, saved yacht	2
28 December 1965	Oil rig Sea Gem, stood by (Note: The crew of the Sea Gem, the first British jack-up oil rig, were rescued by helicopters and a nearby ship)	
16 January 1966	Steam salvage tug Octopus of IJmuiden, escorted vessel	
16 January 1966	Motor vessel Start of Groningen, escorted vessel	
3 April 1966	Oil rig Constellation, stood by rig	
Total		
