= SS Fernebo =

Swedish cargo ship

Coordinates: 52°55′48″N 01°18′50″E

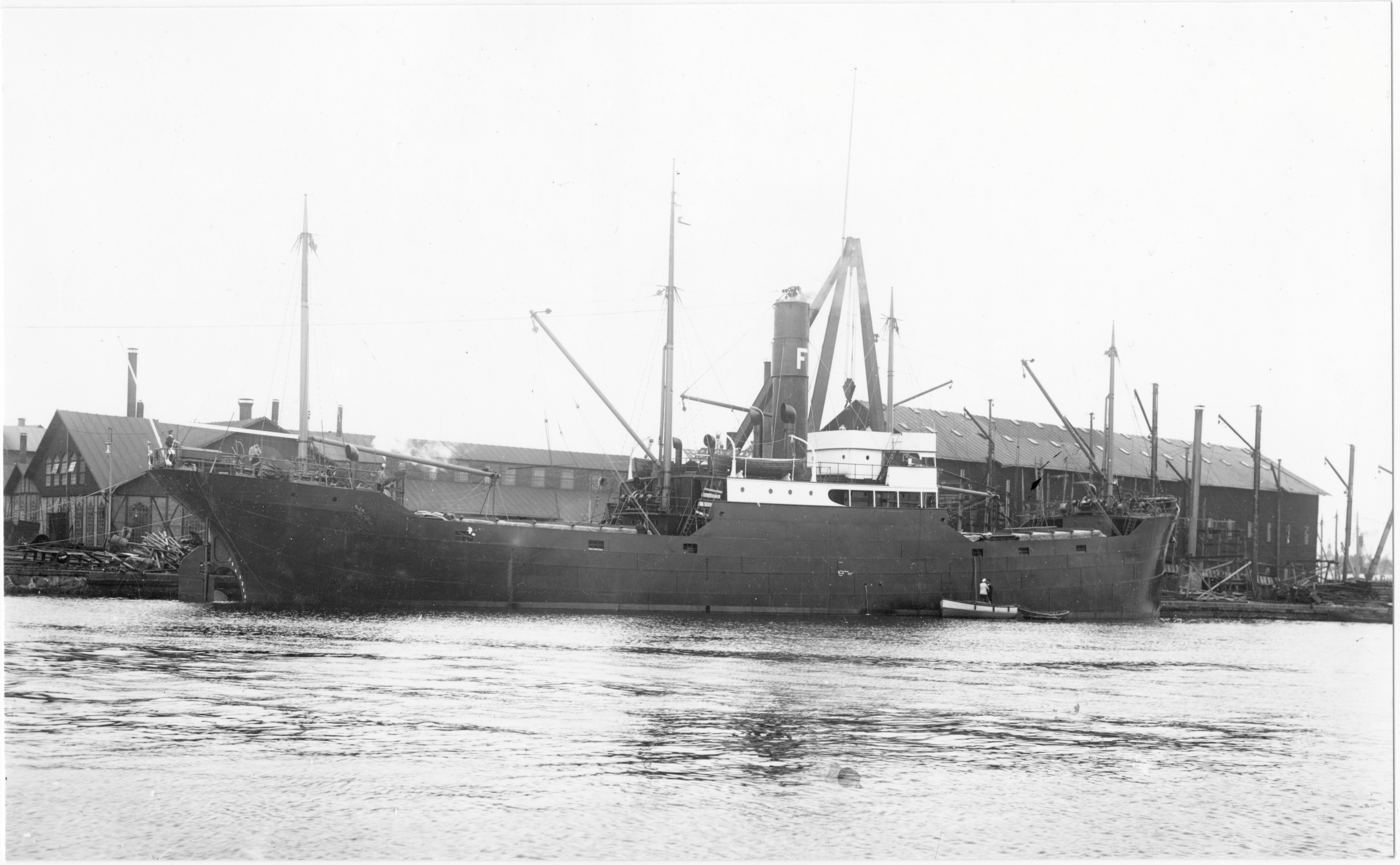
- The Fernebo lying alongside the equipment wharf at Oskarshamn in 1912

History
- Name: Fernebo
- Owner: Broström Axel & Son
- Port of registry: Sweden
- Builder: Oskarshamn Shipyard
- Yard number: 244
- Launched: 1912
- Identification: Code Letters JSTN; Swedish Official Number 5361
- Fate: Wrecked 9 January 1917

General characteristics
- Tonnage: 1,440 GRT
- Length: 69.7 metres (228 ft 8 in)
- Beam: 11 metres (36 ft 1 in)
- Depth: 4.9 metres (16 ft 1 in)
- Installed power: 3 cylinder triple expansion steam engine
- Propulsion: single screw
- Crew: 18 men

SS Fernebo was a Swedish cargo ship that was built in 1912. She was wrecked off Cromer, Norfolk, in England on 9 January 1917, being split in two by a boiler explosion or a German sea mine. Her chief engineer was killed but the remaining 17 crew members were rescued by onlookers and the Cromer lifeboat, commanded by Henry Blogg. Part of her wreck remains on the beach at Cromer but is only visible at extremely low tides.

== Construction and early career ==
The Fernebo was built in 1912 at the Oskarshamn Shipyard in Sweden. She was constructed of steel and measured 69.7 metres (229 ft) long, 11 metres (36 ft) wide and 4.9 metres (16 ft) deep with 1,440 GRT. Fernebo was powered by a three-cylinder triple expansion steam engine driving a single shaft and screw. Her yard number was 244 and Swedish Official Number was 5361. She was owned by Broström Axel & Son of Sweden and operated under the Swedish registry and with call sign JSTN. In early 1915 she was at Gothenburg, Sweden, where she was used as a depot ship for the holding of part of a load of 40,000 sacks of wheat for export at a time when Swedish neutrality during the First World War was under question.

== Wreck ==
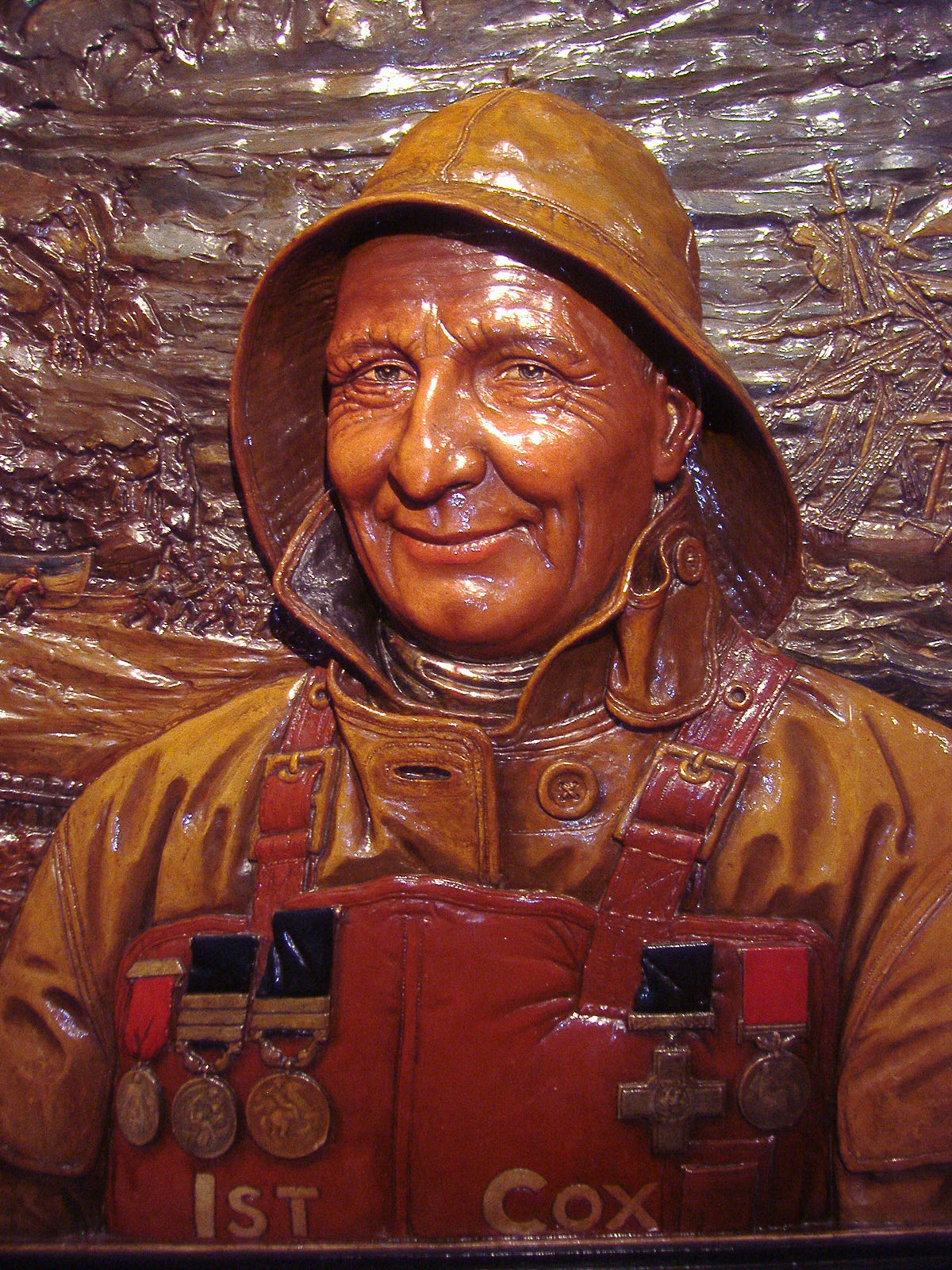
A bust of Henry Blogg

On 9 January 1917 the Fernebo was travelling from Gävle, Sweden, to London, England, with a cargo of timber. When she was near Cromer Pier she suffered an explosion that broke the vessel in two and killed her chief engineer Johan Adolf Anderson. The cause of the explosion is unclear; it was attributed to a sea mine laid by a German submarine in newspaper reports of the time, but may also have been a boiler explosion. The remaining 17 crew members were divided between the two parts of the ship. Six crew on one part drifted ashore, where they were rescued by a human chain of onlookers. The other 11 crewmen on the second part of the ship remained stranded at sea. The sea was rough and there were 50 miles per hour (80 km/h) north-easterly gale-force winds.

The Cromer lifeboat, the Louisa Heartwell, had just returned from assisting a Greek vessel but the boat's coxswain, Henry Blogg, ordered her out to sea again to assist the Fernebo. Blogg and his crew had to launch the boat three times because of the poor conditions but eventually reached the floating portion of the Fernebo and took off the 11 survivors. The event has been described as "one of Norfolk's most heroic rescues" and the act was recognised by the Royal National Lifeboat Institution (RNLI). Blogg received the RNLI's gold medal and his second coxswain received the institution's silver medal. Blogg also later received the Empire Gallantry Medal for the rescue. Blogg became a hero of the lifeboat service, eventually being credited with saving 873 lives, but the rescue of the Fernebo was "perhaps Mr Blogg's most famous feat". Anderson's body washed up at Mundesley, to the east, and he was buried there.

A 20-metre (66 ft) long section of the Fernebo remains on Cromer's East Beach but is only visible at a combination of extremely low tides and erosion of sand deposits. The remains of the section became visible in June 2018 and in January 2020.
