= SS Cantabria =

Cantabria was the name of a number of ships.

- SS Cantabria (1855), lost off the Canary Islands in 1862
- SS Cantabria (1919), sunk by nationalist raider Nadir off the coast of Norfolk, United Kingdom, during the Spanish Civil War

== See also ==
- Spanish oiler Cantabria, a replenishment oiler that entered service with the Spanish Navy in 2010
