= RNLB Manchester Unity of Oddfellows =

RNLB Manchester Unity of Oddfellows is the name of the following ships:

- RNLB Manchester Unity of Oddfellows (ON 960), in service 1961–1990, on display in the Sheringham Museum since 2010
- RNLB Manchester Unity of Oddfellows (B-702), in service 1994–2007

== See also ==
- Manchester Unity of Oddfellows
- List of RNLB lifeboats
- RNLB The Oddfellows
