= 46ft 9in Watson-class lifeboat =

Former RNLI lifeboat class

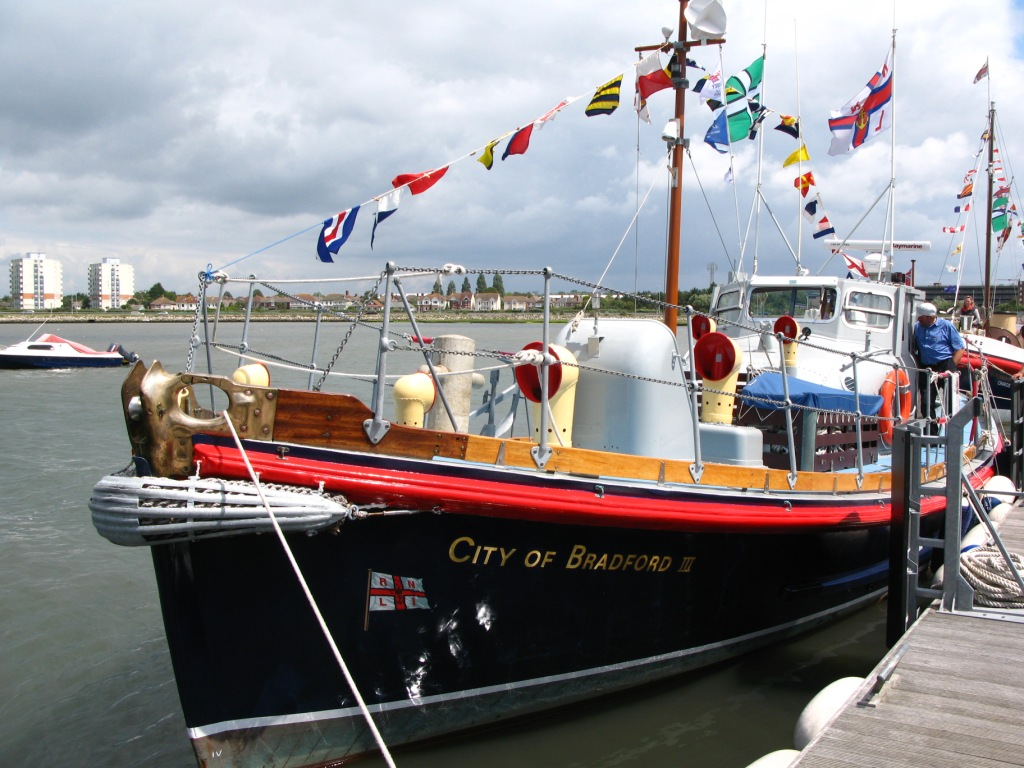
- City of Bradford III (ON 911)

Class overview
- Name: 46ft 9in Watson-class
- Builders: Groves & Guttridge, Cowes; J Samuel White, Cowes; Alexander Robertson & Sons Sandbank, Argyll; Sussex Yacht Company, Shoreham; Camper and Nicholson, Gosport,
- Operators: Royal National Lifeboat Institution
- Preceded by: 46ft Watson-class
- Succeeded by: 47ft Watson-class
- Cost: £17,000–£34,000
- Built: 1947–1956
- In service: 1947–1989
- Completed: 28
- Lost: 1
- Retired: 27

General characteristics
- Class & type: 46ft 9in Watson
- Displacement: 22 tons
- Length: 46 ft 9 in (14.25 m)
- Beam: 12 ft 9 in (3.89 m)
- Propulsion: (As built) 2 × 40bhp Ferry VE4 4-cylinder diesel
- Speed: 8 knots
- Crew: 8

The 46 ft 9in Watson-class lifeboat was a non-self-righting displacement hull lifeboat, built between 1947 and 1956, and operated by the Royal National Lifeboat Institution (RNLI) between 1947 and 1989.

== Description ==
After the final three 46ft Watson-class boats had been completed in 1945/6, production switched to the slightly longer 46 ft 9in type in 1947.

The first five boats were very similar in appearance to the final 46 ft types, with an aft cockpit, turtle shaped shelters, and funnel exhausts. The first boat, William Gammon – Manchester and District XXX, was placed on service at The Mumbles in 1947.

From 1948, the design was completely revised. A new aluminium structure provided a midships steering position in an open cockpit. There was a large aft survivor cabin, which also housed the radio. At the rear of this cabin was a small aft cockpit, with a hatch for access for stretchers, and an emergency helm position. A smaller forward cabin gave access to the engine room and contained the engine controls.

The boats were powered by the same twin 40-bhp Ferry VE4 4-cylinder diesel installation as the earlier boats, but the exhaust was taken up the foremast to outlets well above the deck.

The last boat on service was the Greater London II (Civil Service No.30) (ON 921), built in 1955, and withdrawn from Beaumaris in 1989.

== Modifications ==
The 46 ft 9in Watsons had long lives and were updated through their careers. The first major modification was the enclosing of the cockpit, done to all boats from 1960 onwards. The wheelhouse fitted resembled that of the 47ft Watson but there was no room to install sliding doors, weather shields being installed instead.

Radar was installed on most boats, fitted on the wheelhouse roof, with the original aerial rigging and the aft mast removed and replaced by pole aerials. Most, but not all, boats were re-engined, with various examples of the Ford-based 6-cylinder diesel engine as described below.

Finally, from the early 1980s, all of the midships steering types, (except ON 908, lost in the Fraserburgh disaster), were fitted with an air bag on the aft cabin roof to give a once only self-righting capability.

== Engines ==
The 46 ft 9in Watsons were the final boats to be equipped with RNLI designed engines, in this case, the twin 40-bhp Ferry VE4 4-cylinder diesel engines. The 42ft Watson-class lifeboat, introduced in 1954 was the first type to use commercially available engines, followed by the 47ft Watson-class in 1955 and the 52-foot Barnett-class Mk.II in 1957. These all used the Gardner LW engine, in four, five and six cylinder forms respectively.

The Gardner engines were too large and heavy for the earlier types and were only ever used in new build boats. However, in the mid 1950s Ford had introduced new 4- and 6-cylinder diesel engines for their Thames light truck and coach chassis. These soon attracted the attention of marine engine companies and many marinized versions were on the market. In 1961 the RNLI re-engined a 46ft Watson, Canadian Pacific (ON 803), with the 4-cylinder Ford-based Parsons Marlin, and in 1963 a programme began to re-engine the 41ft Watson and other boats with the Parsons Porbeagle. This 4-cylinder engine was adopted for the 37 ft Oakley-class from 1964 onwards.

The 6-cylinder version was small and light enough to replace the 4-cylinder Ferry VE4 engines, and after the trial installation, again in Canadian Pacific (ON 803) in 1963, a programme to re-engine some 46ft Watsons began in 1965. This was extended to the 46 ft 9in Watsons and in 1965 two boats, Tynesider (ON 852) and ''Duchess of Kent (ON 908), were re-engined with these 6-cylinder Ford-based Parsons Barracuda diesels. Rated at 65-bhp, these gave a 62½% power increase, making the boats more powerful than the newer 47 ft Watsons, and between 1965 and 1968, seven boats were re-engined with Barracudas.

In 1969/70, four boats received another 6-cylinder Ford based unit, the Watermota Sea Lion, rated at 70-bhp. From 1971, seven boats were equipped with 70-bhp Ford Thorneycroft 380s, the last as late as 1982, while in 1972 three boats received 70-bhp Ford Mermaid 595s. A feature of the re-engine programme, was the replacement of the foremast exhaust system, by outlets on each side of the hull, similar to the 37 ft Oakleys. This allowed a slimmer, lighter foremast to be fitted. The exhaust system on some boats like the Howard Marryat remained unchanged.

== Fleet ==
=== Aft cockpit type ===
| ON (Note: ON is the RNLI's Official Number of the boat.) | Name | Built | In service | Stations | Shelter | Radar | Comments |
|---|---|---|---|---|---|---|---|
| 849 | William Gammon – Manchester and District XXX | 1947 | 1947–1974 | The Mumbles | 1968 | 1973 | (Note: Gift of the Manchester and Salford LB fund, built by Groves and Guttridge of Cowes, with internal rudder, costing £16,962. Twin 65-hp Parsons Barracuda Ford 590E 6-cyl. diesel engines, 1968.) Sold February 1984. In storage for Swansea Museum, December 2025. |
| 849 | William Gammon – Manchester and District XXX | 1947 | 1974–1982 | Relief fleet | 1968 | 1973 | Sold February 1984. In storage for Swansea Museum, December 2025. |
| 852 | Tynesider | 1947 | 1947–1979 | Tynemouth | 1965 | 1980 | (Note: Gift of the Tyneside Blitzed LB fund, built by J. Samuel White of Cowes, with internal rudder, cockpit, costing £16,367. Twin 65-hp Parsons Barracuda Ford 590E 6-cyl. diesel engines, 1965.) Sold February 1984. Unaltered, under restoration at Iron Wharf, Faversham, December 2025. |
| 852 | Tynesider | 1947 | 1979–1983 | Relief fleet | 1965 | 1980 | Sold February 1984. Unaltered, under restoration at Iron Wharf, Faversham, December 2025. |
| 853 | Winston Churchill (Civil Service No.8) | 1947 | 1948–1979 | Blyth | 1967 | 1975 | (Note: Gift of the Civil Service LB fund, built by J. Samuel White of Cowes, with internal rudder, costing £16,535. Twin 65-hp Parsons Barracuda Ford 590E 6-cyl. diesel engines, 1967.) Sold July 1983. Renamed Watson Explorer. Stored for restoration at Titchmarsh Marina, Walton-on-the-Naze, August 2025. |
| 853 | Winston Churchill (Civil Service No.8) | 1947 | 1979–1982 | Relief fleet | 1967 | 1975 | Sold July 1983. Renamed Watson Explorer. Stored for restoration at Titchmarsh Marina, Walton-on-the-Naze, August 2025. |
| 854 | Sarah Tilson | 1949 | 1950–1978 | Baltimore | No | No | (Note: Legacy of Mr Tilson, built by Alexander Robertson & Sons of Sandbank, Argyll, with internal rudder, costing £17,790.) Sold December 1979. Renamed The Sarah. Unaltered as The Sarah Tilson at Medway Bridge, Rochester, Kent, October 2025. |
| 854 | Sarah Tilson | 1949 | 1978–1979 | Relief fleet | No | No | Sold December 1979. Renamed The Sarah. Unaltered as The Sarah Tilson at Medway Bridge, Rochester, Kent, October 2025. |
| 855 | W. M. Tilson | 1949 | 1950–1969 | Arranmore | No | No | (Note: Legacy of Mr Tilson, built by Alexander Robertson & Sons of Sandbank, Argyll, with internal rudder, costing £18,057.) Sold August 1970. Last reported as semi-derelict at Magerascouse Road, Comber, County Down, October 2012, now believed broken up. |

=== Midship steering cabin type ===
| ON | Name | Built | In service | Stations | W/house | Radar | Comments |
|---|---|---|---|---|---|---|---|
| 865 | Elizabeth Rippon | 1948 | 1948–1975 | St Helier | 1960 | 1966 | (Note: Legacy of Mrs Rippon, built by J. Samuel White of Cowes, with internal rudder, costing £19,094. Added airbag for self-righting. Twin 65-hp Parsons Barracuda Ford 590E 6-cyl. diesel engines, 1966.) Sold October 1977. Renamed Star of Helier. In unaltered condition as Elizabeth Rippon at Barmouth, Wales, December 2025. |
| 865 | Elizabeth Rippon | 1948 | 1975–1977 | Relief fleet | 1960 | 1966 | Sold October 1977. Renamed Star of Helier. In unaltered condition as Elizabeth Rippon at Barmouth, Wales, December 2025. |
| 866 | Charles Henry Ashley | 1949 | 1949–1979 | Porthdinllaen | 1962 | 1969 | (Note: Legacy of Mr C. C. Ashley of Menton, France, built by J. Samuel White of Cowes, with internal rudder, costing £19,040. Added airbag for self-righting. Twin 70-hp WaterMota Ford Sea-Lion diesel engines, 1969.) Sold March 1987. Renamed Sidney. In unaltered condition as Charles Ashley at Port D'Hyères, France, May 2025 |
| 866 | Charles Henry Ashley | 1949 | 1979–1981 | Relief fleet | 1962 | 1969 | Sold March 1987. Renamed Sidney. In unaltered condition as Charles Ashley at Port D'Hyères, France, May 2025 |
| 866 | Charles Henry Ashley | 1949 | 1981–1982 | Penlee | 1962 | 1969 | Sold March 1987. Renamed Sidney. In unaltered condition as Charles Ashley at Port D'Hyères, France, May 2025 |
| 866 | Charles Henry Ashley | 1949 | 1982 | Fowey | 1962 | 1969 | Sold March 1987. Renamed Sidney. In unaltered condition as Charles Ashley at Port D'Hyères, France, May 2025 |
| 866 | Charles Henry Ashley | 1949 | 1982–1987 | Relief fleet | 1962 | 1969 | Sold March 1987. Renamed Sidney. In unaltered condition as Charles Ashley at Port D'Hyères, France, May 2025 |
| 867 | Lady Scott (Civil Service No.4) | 1949 | 1949–1981 | Portrush | 1961 | 1972 | (Note: Gift of Civil Service LB fund, built by J. Samuel White of Cowes, with internal rudder, costing £18,972. Added airbag for self-righting. Twin 70-hp Thornycroft 380 6-cyl. diesel engines, 1972.) Sold July 1987. Renamed Marjorie Rae, later Janet Rae. Under restoration, near Ballymena, County Antrim, December 2025. |
| 867 | Lady Scott (Civil Service No.4) | 1949 | 1981–1986 | Relief fleet | 1961 | 1972 | Sold July 1987. Renamed Marjorie Rae, later Janet Rae. Under restoration, near Ballymena, County Antrim, December 2025. |
| 868 | John and Lucy Cordingley | 1950 | 1950–1960 | Teesmouth | 1960 | No | (Note: Legacy of Mrs Cordingley, built by Sussex Yacht Company of Shoreham-by-Sea, with internal rudder, costing £19,816. Added airbag for self-righting.) Sold November 1981. Renamed Jaybee, later Tempo. At Hall Quay, Great Yarmouth, June 2024. |
| 868 | John and Lucy Cordingley | 1950 | 1960–1969 | Helvick Head | 1960 | No | Sold November 1981. Renamed Jaybee, later Tempo. At Hall Quay, Great Yarmouth, June 2024. |
| 868 | John and Lucy Cordingley | 1950 | 1969–1981 | Relief fleet | 1960 | No | Sold November 1981. Renamed Jaybee, later Tempo. At Hall Quay, Great Yarmouth, June 2024. |
| 885 | Sir Samuel Kelly | 1950 | 1950–1976 | Donaghadee | 1960 | 1972 | (Note: Gift of Lady Kelly, built by J. Samuel White of Cowes, with internal rudder, costing £25,073. Added airbag for self-righting. Twin 70-hp Mermaid 595 diesel engines, 1972.) Sold 1980. Restored and on display, at Donaghadee, Northern Ireland, December 2025. |
| 885 | Sir Samuel Kelly | 1950 | 1976–1979 | Relief fleet | 1960 | 1972 | Sold 1980. Restored and on display, at Donaghadee, Northern Ireland, December 2025. |
| 886 | Sarah Townsend Porritt | 1951 | 1951–1978 | Lytham St Annes | 1961 | 1971 | (Note: Legacy of Miss Porritt, built by Sussex Yacht Company of Shoreham-by-Sea, with internal rudder, costing £24,427. Added airbag for self-righting. Twin 70-hp Thornycroft 380 6-cyl. diesel engines, 1971.) Sold October 1982. Renamed Sarah. For Sale (Free) in very neglected condition, following failed 'charity' restoration project, Hayle, Cornwall, February 2026. |
| 886 | Sarah Townsend Porritt | 1951 | 1978–1981 | Relief fleet | 1961 | 1971 | Sold October 1982. Renamed Sarah. For Sale (Free) in very neglected condition, following failed 'charity' restoration project, Hayle, Cornwall, February 2026. |
| 887 | Sir Godfrey Baring | 1951 | 1952–1968 | Clacton-on-Sea | 1962 | 1972 | (Note: Funded by the RNLI, built by J. Samuel White of Cowes, with internal rudder, costing £24,628. Added airbag for self-righting. Twin 70-hp Mermaid 595 diesel engines, 1972.) Displayed at the Festival of Britain, 1951. Sold July 1986. Renamed Duchess of Cornwall. Last reported as Sir Baring, trip boat at Friedeburg, Germany, June 2012. |
| 887 | Sir Godfrey Baring | 1951 | 1968–1970 | Wick | 1962 | 1972 | Displayed at the Festival of Britain, 1951. Sold July 1986. Renamed Duchess of Cornwall. Last reported as Sir Baring, trip boat at Friedeburg, Germany, June 2012. |
| 887 | Sir Godfrey Baring | 1951 | 1970–1972 | Relief fleet | 1962 | 1972 | Displayed at the Festival of Britain, 1951. Sold July 1986. Renamed Duchess of Cornwall. Last reported as Sir Baring, trip boat at Friedeburg, Germany, June 2012. |
| 887 | Sir Godfrey Baring | 1951 | 1972–1982 | Workington | 1962 | 1972 | Displayed at the Festival of Britain, 1951. Sold July 1986. Renamed Duchess of Cornwall. Last reported as Sir Baring, trip boat at Friedeburg, Germany, June 2012. |
| 887 | Sir Godfrey Baring | 1951 | 1982–1986 | Relief fleet | 1962 | 1972 | Displayed at the Festival of Britain, 1951. Sold July 1986. Renamed Duchess of Cornwall. Last reported as Sir Baring, trip boat at Friedeburg, Germany, June 2012. |
| 888 | North Foreland (Civil Service No.11) | 1951 | 1951–1978 | Margate | 1961 | 1973 | (Note: Gift of the Civil Service LB fund, built by J. Samuel White of Cowes, with internal rudder, costing £24,846. Added airbag for self-righting.); At Bristol Lifeboat Museum, 1982. On display in the RNLI Heritage Collection since April 1996 at Chatham Historic Dockyard, December 2025. |
| 888 | North Foreland (Civil Service No.11) | 1951 | 1978–1981 | Relief fleet | 1961 | 1973 | At Bristol Lifeboat Museum, 1982. On display in the RNLI Heritage Collection since April 1996 at Chatham Historic Dockyard, December 2025. |
| 896 | Douglas Hyde | 1952 | 1952–1969 | Rosslare Harbour | 1962 | 1970 | (Note: Funded by the RNLI, built by Camper and Nicholson of Gosport, with internal rudder, costing £33,196. Added airbag for self-righting. Twin 70-hp WaterMota Ford Sea-Lion diesel engines, 1970.) Sold February 1973. Renamed Rima. Later reverted to Douglas Hyde, but scrapped at Peel, Isle of Man, 2018. |
| 896 | Douglas Hyde | 1952 | 1970–1972 | Dunmore East | 1962 | 1970 | Sold February 1973. Renamed Rima. Later reverted to Douglas Hyde, but scrapped at Peel, Isle of Man, 2018. |
| 900 | Herbert Leigh | 1951 | 1951–1982 | Barrow | 1958 | 1974 | (Note: Gift of Mr Leigh, built by J. Samuel White of Cowes, with internal rudder, costing £25,855. Added airbag for self-righting. Twin 70-hp Thornycroft 380 6-cyl. diesel engines, 1977.) Sold 1989. On display since 1994 at the Dock Museum, Barrow-in-Furness, December 2025. |
| 900 | Herbert Leigh | 1951 | 1983–1988 | Relief fleet | 1958 | 1974 | Sold 1989. On display since 1994 at the Dock Museum, Barrow-in-Furness, December 2025. |
| 901 | Michael and Lily Davis | 1953 | 1953–1976 | Ramsgate | 1967 | 1972 | (Note: Legacies of Mrs Davis, Mr Fox, Mrs Halfon and Mr Graystone, built by J. Samuel White of Cowes, with external rudder, costing £28,811. Added airbag for self-righting.) Sold 1979. Renamed Viceroy, later Coastal Waters. Broken up after sinking at her berth at Swansea Marina, July 2025. |
| 901 | Michael and Lily Davis | 1953 | 1976–1979 | Relief fleet | 1967 | 1972 | Sold 1979. Renamed Viceroy, later Coastal Waters. Broken up after sinking at her berth at Swansea Marina, July 2025. |
| 908 | Duchess of Kent | 1954 | 1954–1970 | Fraserburgh | 1961 | No | (Note: Funded by the RNLI, built by Groves and Guttridge of Cowes, with external rudder, costing £31,773. Added airbag for self-righting. Twin 65-hp Parsons Barracuda Ford 590E 6-cyl. diesel engines, 1965.); Capsized on service with five crew lost, 21 January 1970. Broken up, October 1970. |
| 910 | Edian Courtauld | 1953 | 1953–1977 | Walton and Frinton | 1960 | 1968 | (Note: Gift of Mr A. Courtauld, built by J. Samuel White of Cowes, with external rudder, costing £29,687. Added airbag for self-righting. Twin 65-hp Parsons Barracuda Ford 590E 6-cyl. diesel engines, 1968.) Sold August 1981. Renamed Scapa Agent, later Juno. Now Iris B at Port Marine, Portishead, April 2025. |
| 910 | Edian Courtauld | 1953 | 1977–1981 | Relief fleet | 1960 | 1968 | Sold August 1981. Renamed Scapa Agent, later Juno. Now Iris B at Port Marine, Portishead, April 2025. |
| 911 | City of Bradford III | 1954 | 1954–1977 | Humber | 1962 | 1968 | (Note: Gift of the City of Bradford LB fund, built by J. Samuel White of Cowes, with external rudder, costing £29,593. Added airbag for self-righting. Twin 65-hp Parsons Barracuda Ford 590E 6-cyl. diesel engines, 1968.) Sold August 1985. In unaltered condition, at Salcombe, Devon, December 2025. |
| 911 | City of Bradford III | 1954 | 1978–1985 | Lytham St Annes | 1962 | 1968 | Sold August 1985. In unaltered condition, at Salcombe, Devon, December 2025. |
| 919 | Deneys Reitz | 1954 | 1954–1980 | Fowey | 1960 | 1971 | (Note: Funded by South Africa branch of the RNLI, built by Groves and Guttridge of Cowes, with external rudder, costing £31,922. Added airbag for self-righting. Twin 70-hp WaterMota Ford Sea-Lion diesel engines, 1971.) Sold September 1980. Renamed Joy M, later Daniel Arthur. Last reported as Deneys Reitz at Södermanland, Sweden, August 2018. |
| 921 | Greater London II (Civil Service No.30) | 1955 | 1955–1976 | Southend-on-Sea | 1960 | 1967 | (Note: Funded by the Civil Service LB fund, built by Groves and Guttridge of Cowes, with external rudder, costing £32,163. Added airbag for self-righting. Twin 70-hp WaterMota Ford Sea-Lion diesel engines, 1969.) Sold 1991. Renamed Gallichan. In unaltered condition at Portland Marina, October 2025. |
| 921 | Greater London II (Civil Service No.30) | 1955 | 1977–1989 | Beaumaris | 1960 | 1967 | Sold 1991. Renamed Gallichan. In unaltered condition at Portland Marina, October 2025. |
| 925 | Henry Comber Brown | 1955 | 1955–1986 | Tenby | 1962 | 1973 | (Note: Legacies of Mr Comber Brown and Miss Haldane, built by J. Samuel White of Cowes, with external rudder, costing £31,674. Added airbag for self-righting. Twin 70-hp WaterMota Ford Sea-Lion diesel engines, 1969.) Sold 1987. Renamed T. S. Manxman. In unaltered condition as Henry Comber Brown at Ramsey, Isle of Man, June 2024. |
| 926 | Guy and Clare Hunter | 1955 | 1955–1981 | St Mary's | 1960 | 1965 | (Note: Legacies of Mrs Hunter, Mrs Brown, Mrs Widdrington, Miss Sheffield, Miss Reilly, Mr Bennet and Mrs Harris, built by J. Samuel White of Cowes, with external rudder, costing £32,103. Added airbag for self-righting. Twin 70-hp Mermaid 595 diesel engines, 1972.) Sold June 1988. In unaltered condition at Quinton Nelson Yard, Donaghadee, Northern Ireland, December 2025. |
| 926 | Guy and Clare Hunter | 1955 | 1981–1982 | Fowey | 1960 | 1965 | Sold June 1988. In unaltered condition at Quinton Nelson Yard, Donaghadee, Northern Ireland, December 2025. |
| 926 | Guy and Clare Hunter | 1955 | 1982–1983 | Penlee | 1960 | 1965 | Sold June 1988. In unaltered condition at Quinton Nelson Yard, Donaghadee, Northern Ireland, December 2025. |
| 926 | Guy and Clare Hunter | 1955 | 1983–1984 | Padstow | 1960 | 1965 | Sold June 1988. In unaltered condition at Quinton Nelson Yard, Donaghadee, Northern Ireland, December 2025. |
| 926 | Guy and Clare Hunter | 1955 | 1984–1985 | Cromer | 1960 | 1965 | Sold June 1988. In unaltered condition at Quinton Nelson Yard, Donaghadee, Northern Ireland, December 2025. |
| 926 | Guy and Clare Hunter | 1955 | 1985–1987 | Relief fleet | 1960 | 1965 | Sold June 1988. In unaltered condition at Quinton Nelson Yard, Donaghadee, Northern Ireland, December 2025. |
| 928 | Lilla Marras, Douglas and Will | 1955 | 1955–1968 | Cromarty | 1962 | 1972 | (Note: Legacies of Mrs Marras, Mr Douglas and Mr W. Kennedy, built by Groves & Guttridge of Cowes, with external rudder, costing £33,723. Added airbag for self-righting. Twin 70-hp Thornycroft 380 6-cyl. diesel engines, 1972.) Sold October 1982. Renamed Adriana of Loosedrecht, later Happy. Used as a B&B on The Noorderhaven, Netherlands, now stored as Lilla Marras at Harlingen, Netherlands, December 2025. |
| 928 | Lilla Marras, Douglas and Will | 1955 | 1968–1974 | Falmouth | 1962 | 1972 | Sold October 1982. Renamed Adriana of Loosedrecht, later Happy. Used as a B&B on The Noorderhaven, Netherlands, now stored as Lilla Marras at Harlingen, Netherlands, December 2025. |
| 928 | Lilla Marras, Douglas and Will | 1955 | 1974–1978 | Relief fleet | 1962 | 1972 | Sold October 1982. Renamed Adriana of Loosedrecht, later Happy. Used as a B&B on The Noorderhaven, Netherlands, now stored as Lilla Marras at Harlingen, Netherlands, December 2025. |
| 928 | Lilla Marras, Douglas and Will | 1955 | 1978–1979 | Donaghadee | 1962 | 1972 | Sold October 1982. Renamed Adriana of Loosedrecht, later Happy. Used as a B&B on The Noorderhaven, Netherlands, now stored as Lilla Marras at Harlingen, Netherlands, December 2025. |
| 928 | Lilla Marras, Douglas and Will | 1955 | 1979–1982 | Relief fleet | 1962 | 1972 | Sold October 1982. Renamed Adriana of Loosedrecht, later Happy. Used as a B&B on The Noorderhaven, Netherlands, now stored as Lilla Marras at Harlingen, Netherlands, December 2025. |
| 929 | R.A. Colby Cubbin No.1 | 1956 | 1956–1988 | Douglas | 1962 | 1975 | (Note: Legacies of Mrs Cubbin, built by J. Samuel White of Cowes, with external rudder, costing £32,000. Added airbag for self-righting. Twin 70-hp Thornycroft 380 6-cyl. diesel engines, 1980.) Sold 1989. Renamed Redundant Hero, later Colby Cubbin. Being broken for spares at Bezons, France, November 2017. |
| 930 | R.A. Colby Cubbin No.2 | 1956 | 1956–1976 | Port St Mary | 1962 | 1973 | (Note: Legacies of Mrs Cubbin, built by J. Samuel White of Cowes, with external rudder, costing £32,829. Added airbag for self-righting.) Sold October 1977. Renamed Southport Girl. Restored to original, at Port Penrhyn, Wales, September 2025. |
| 930 | R.A. Colby Cubbin No.2 | 1956 | 1976–1977 | Relief fleet | 1962 | 1973 | Sold October 1977. Renamed Southport Girl. Restored to original, at Port Penrhyn, Wales, September 2025. |
| 931 | Richard Vernon and Mary Garforth of Leeds | 1956 | 1957–1987 | Angle | 1961 | 1972 | (Note: Legacies of Mr Vernon and Mr Garforth, built by J. Samuel White of Cowes, with external rudder, costing £33,587. Added airbag for self-righting. Twin 70-hp Thornycroft 380 6-cyl. diesel engines, 1981.) Sold 1989. Renamed Scubie Doo, later Spirit of Angle. In unaltered condition as Richard Vernon and Mary Garforth of Leeds at Wexford, Ireland, November 2025. |
| 931 | Richard Vernon and Mary Garforth of Leeds | 1956 | 1987–1988 | Wicklow | 1961 | 1972 | Sold 1989. Renamed Scubie Doo, later Spirit of Angle. In unaltered condition as Richard Vernon and Mary Garforth of Leeds at Wexford, Ireland, November 2025. |
| 932 | Howard Marryat | 1956 | 1957–1981 | Fishguard | 1961 | 1971 | (Note: Legacies of Mr H. Marryat, and a gift from Mr R. Marryat, built by J. Samuel White of Cowes, with external rudder, costing £33,863. Added airbag for self-righting. Twin 70-hp Thornycroft 380 6-cyl. diesel engines, 1982.) Sold September 1989. Renamed North Foreland, later Howard Marryat. In unaltered condition as Josef de Waey at Blankenberge, Belgium, June 2025. |
| 932 | Howard Marryat | 1956 | 1982–1986 | Barrow | 1961 | 1971 | Sold September 1989. Renamed North Foreland, later Howard Marryat. In unaltered condition as Josef de Waey at Blankenberge, Belgium, June 2025. |
| 932 | Howard Marryat | 1956 | 1986–1988 | Moelfre | 1961 | 1971 | Sold September 1989. Renamed North Foreland, later Howard Marryat. In unaltered condition as Josef de Waey at Blankenberge, Belgium, June 2025. |
| 932 | Howard Marryat | 1956 | 1988–1989 | Relief fleet | 1961 | 1971 | Sold September 1989. Renamed North Foreland, later Howard Marryat. In unaltered condition as Josef de Waey at Blankenberge, Belgium, June 2025. |

== See also ==
- Watson-class lifeboat
- Royal National Lifeboat Institution lifeboats
