= RNLB Manchester Unity of Oddfellows (B-702) =

History

United Kingdom
- Name: Manchester Unity of Oddfellows
- Namesake: The Independent Order of Oddfellows, Manchester Unity,
- Owner: Royal National Lifeboat Institution (RNLI)
- Builder: Hull by Souter Shipyard, fitted out by RNLI inshore lifeboat centre, Cowes, Isle of Wight.
- Official Number: B-702
- Donor: A gift of The Independent Order of Oddfellows, Manchester Unity,
- Stations: Sheringham
- Cost: £61,000
- Laid down: 1993
- In service: 29 February 1994 to 11 July 2007

General characteristics
- Class & type: Atlantic 75
- Type: Rigid inflatable
- Tonnage: 3,200lbs
- Length: 20 ft 3 in (6.17 m)
- Beam: 8 ft 8 in (2.64 m)
- Installed power: 2 x 70bhp Evinrude engines
- Propulsion: Two Outboard engines
- Speed: 32 kn (59 km/h)
- Range: 2.5 hours at max speed
- Crew: 3

RNLB Manchester Unity of Oddfellows (B-702) was an Atlantic 75-class lifeboat rigid-inflatable inshore lifeboat on station at the English coastal town of Sheringham in the county of Norfolk in the United Kingdom. The boat was a permanent replacement for the Atlantic 21-class lifeboat RNLB B-536 which served at Sheringham from 29 January 1994.

== Funding and new equipment ==
Manchester Unity of Oddfellows was the very first Atlantic 75-class of lifeboat to be placed on permanent service at an RNLI station in the United Kingdom, reinforcing the faith and investment in the continuing future of the Sheringham station. The new lifeboat was built at a cost of £61,000 and this was funded by the Independent Order of Oddfellows, Manchester Unity, who through this new boat maintained their strong link with the Sheringham branch of the RNLI. The organisation had, in the past, funded the long serving Oakley-class lifeboat RNLB The Manchester Unity of Oddfellows (ON 960). The Oddfellows also funded a new powerful tractor to launch the new lifeboat. The tractor, a Talus four wheel drive hydrostatic mode TW24H (registration No. K313 ENT) cost the sum of £147,000. To launch, the new tractor would propel the lifeboat on its carriage trailer, reversing down to the beach on the concrete slipway and pull it back up on retrieval.

== Description ==
The Atlantic 75-class superseded the Atlantic 21-class. The name Atlantic is derived from Atlantic College in Wales, where the rigid inflatable B-class was first developed. The designation 75 is derived from its length of nearly 7.5 m (25 ft). A significant improvement to this class over the 21 is the addition of a ballast tank installed at the front of the lifeboat which enables the craft to launch into larger surf than the previous class. The ballast when full, either of sea water or water from a hose, weighs the same as three fully grown men. The lifeboat has a crew of three and has a top speed of 32 kn (59 km/h) and can operated in severe weather conditions up to winds of near gale force. The design incorporates twin outboard engines which are completely waterproofed, even if totally immersed. The hull of the lifeboat is constructed from Glass Reinforced plastic with a hypalon coated polyester which is highly resistant attack by marine organisms, chemicals and temperature extremes. The lifeboat had a displacement of 1.6 tonnes. Her equipment included two VHF radios, First Aid Kit & oxygen, GPS navigation system, night vision equipment, self-righting system, anchor and various warps, toolkit, towing system, illuminating and distress pyrotechnics, spotlight, torches. The rollbar assembly installed above the engines contains a self-righting bag which was operated by a member of the crew activating a gas bottle.

== Service ==
Manchester Unity of Oddfellows first service took place on 1 April 1994 when she was launched to assist local fishing boats. In gusting winds of up to force nine, heavy rain and in poor visibility. The fishing boats had been caught out by the weather. Two of the boats had managed to make it back to shore. The third was called Alison Cathleen with one man aboard. The vessel had turned head to wind but her engine was working on a reduced power. The lifeboat took her into tow and beached her safely.

=== Relief Lifeboats ===
During the period of Manchester Unity of Oddfellows service at Sheringham, she was relieved five times by reserve Atlantic 75-class lifeboats. Three of these periods the RNLB Vera Skilton (B-705) took up station as relief. The other two periods were stationed by RNLB Susan Peacock (B-701) and RNLB Eva Pank (B-756).

== Rescue and service ==
This record includes of the relief lifeboats during the period of service of Manchester Unity of Oddfellows (B-702)

- RNLB Susan Peacock (B-700)
- RNLB Vera Skilton (B-705)
- RNLB Eva Pank (B-756)

Manchester Unity of Oddfellows B-702
Date	Casualty	Lives saved
1994
1 April	Fishing boat Alison Cathleen, saved boat	1
Susan Peacock B-700 Relief lifeboat
1994
20 May	Fishing boat, escorted boat	
Manchester Unity of Oddfellows B-702
1994
26 July	Two sailboards, gave help	
Vera Skilton B-705 Relief Lifeboat
1994
27 November	Barge Polly, gave help	
Manchester Unity of Oddfellows B-702
1995
23 March	Fishing vessel Verity Ellen, boat and one person brought in	
12 April	Fishing vessel Carrie Anne, boat and two people brought in	
21 April	Fishing vessel Samara, boat and one person brought in	
25 April	Motor fishing vessels Blue Boy, Scout and My Girl II, escorted boats	
26 July	Motor fishing vessels Blue Boy and My Girl II, escorted boats	
1996
28 May	Fishing vessel Laura Jane, boat and three people brought in	
4 July	Fishing vessel Blue Boy, boat and one person brought in	
Vera Skilton B-705 Relief Lifeboat
1996
11 September	Fishing vessel Blue Boy, boat and one person brought in	
1997
9 July	Three Divers	3
Manchester Unity of Oddfellows B-702
1997
13 September	Motor fishing vessels Mizpah and Valerie Theresa, escorted boats	
Vera Skilton B-705 Relief Lifeboat
1998
25 February	Injured man on board fishing vessel Katie Girl, Man brought in	
28 February	Sailboard, gave help	
3 April	Motor fishing vessels Anna Gail, Sarah Jayne, Verity Ellen and Sheila Joyce, escorted boats	
May 22	Fishing vessel, stood by	
May 29	Fishing vessel, escorted craft	
Manchester Unity of Oddfellows B-702
1998
24 August	Motor cruiser Fairlie Knackered, escorted craft	
29 September	Yacht Sissi, Saved craft	1
14 October	Fishing vessel Johnathan James, boat and two people brought in	
1999
5 April	Yacht, boat and one person brought in.	
6 May	Fishing vessel, escorted craft	
18 May	Motor boat, boat and two people brought in.	
10 July	Dive support craft Desert Moon Six divers, stood by craft	6
Eva Pank B-756 Relief Lifeboat
1999
2 August	Two divers	2
Manchester Unity of Oddfellows B-702
1999
6 September	Two people stranded	2
2000
14 March	Fishing vessel Tradewinds, boat brought in	
23 April	Fiashing vessel, craft brought in.	
24 April	Powerboat, two people and craft brought in.	
27 May	Fishing vessel Minuet, stood by.	
28 May	Yacht Panter, escorted vessel.	
6 August	Speedboat Diminished Responsibility, Boat and three people brought in.	
27 August	Powerboat Independence, Craft brought in	7
12 September	Fishing vessel Lynn Anne, gave help	
13 September	Fishing vessel Fin-Ar-Bed, assisted to save craft	
2001
23 March	Fishing vessel Tradewinds, craft brought in.	
4 April	Fishing vessel Providence II, craft brought in.	
7 August	Jet Ski, saved craft	1
7 August	Canoe, sved craft	1
24 August	Powerboat, boat and three people brought in	
26 August	Sick diver on diving boat Calypso, landed 2 people and craft brought in.	1
12 September	Jet ski, gave help.	
2002
9 January	Fishing vessel Zuider Zee, stood by	
18 June	Man over board from sailboard, saved board and landed one man	1
3 August	Skiff, three people and craft brought in	
24 October	Yacht Quay Sweep, Saved craft	4
24 November	Sailboard, craft brought in.	
30 November	Yacht Kumple, Boat and one person brought in	
2003
9 April	Two persons cut off by the tide at Stiffkey, stood by	
12 May	Fishing vessel Laura Jane, stood by	
20 June	Crab boat Lisa Diane, craft brought in.	
24 June	Fishing boat Alison Katherine, craft brought in.	
31 August	Catamaran, stood by.	
1 September	Sailing dinghy, stood by	
2004
3 April	Fishing vessel, Boat and one person brought in	
18 April	Fishing boat Alison Katherine, one person and craft brought in.	
2005
15 June	Sailing dinghy Warthog, craft brought in.	
18 July	Inflatable dinghy, stood by	
1 August	Fishing boat Blue Boy, One person and craft brought in.	
7 October	Fishing boat Samara, One person and craft brought in.	
20 November	Fishing boat Harriot Jane, two people and craft brought in.	
2006
3 January	Fishing boat Lisa Diane, two people and craft brought in.	
8 May	Fishing boat Trade Winds, escorted vessel	
24 June	Tanks partially submerged in the sea, gave help	
6 July	Yacht Blue Celeste, gave help	
9 August	Yacht Gilly, one person and craft brought in.	
23 September	Person in the sea, gave help	
2007
17 February	Person in sea	1

Preceded by RNLB B-536	RNLB Manchester Unity of Oddfellows (B-702); 1994 to 2007	Succeeded by RNLB The Oddfellows (B-818)
