= RNLB Lloyds II =

Decommissioned British lifeboat

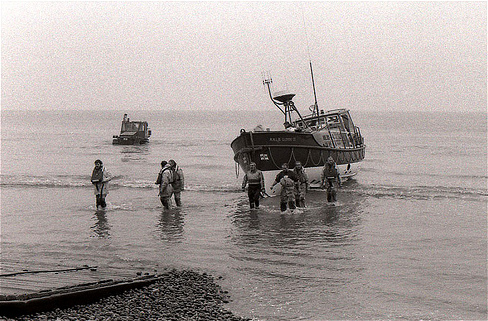
- RNLB Sheringham Lifeboat Lloyds II (ON 986)

History

British RNLI Flag
- Owner: Royal National Lifeboat Institution (RNLI)
- Builder: Morris and Lorimer, Sandbank, Argyll
- Official Number: ON 986
- Donor: Members of Lloyd's of London
- Station: Ilfracombe and Sheringham
- Cost: £34,000
- Laid down: 1966
- Christened: 13 September 1966 by Mrs Sturge, the wife of R W Sturge, chairman of Lloyds at Ilfracombe
- Fate: Broken up at Rainham in August 1993

General characteristics
- Class & type: Oakley
- Type: Self-righting
- Tonnage: 12 long tons 10 cwt (28,000 lb or 12.7 t)
- Length: 37 ft 0 in (11.28 m) overall
- Beam: 11 ft 6 in (3.51 m)
- Installed power: Twin 52 bhp (39 kW) Parsons Porbeagle 592E four cylinder Diesel engine
- Propulsion: 2× fixed pitch 5 blade propellers
- Speed: 9 knots (17 km/h)
- Notes: From 1966 to 1990 this lifeboat was stationed at Ilfracombe in Devon. The boat was re-hulled between 1986 and 1987 at Fairy Marine Ltd, Cowes

RNLB Lloyds II (ON 986) was an Oakley-class lifeboat of the Royal National Lifeboat Institution (RNLI) stationed at Sheringham in the English county of Norfolk from 8 October 1990 until April 1992, when she was replaced by the Atlantic 75 second generation Rigid Inflatable Boat (RIB) Manchester Unity of Oddfellows in April 1992. During the time that the Lloyds II was on station at Sheringham, she performed 13 service launches.

== Design and construction ==
Lloyds II was built at the yard of Morris and Lorimer at Sandbank, Argyll. She was an Oakley-class self-righting design which combined great stability with the ability to self-right in the event of the lifeboat capsizing. This was achieved by a system of shifting water ballast. The system worked by the lifeboat taking on one and half tons of sea water at launching into a tank built into the base of the hull. If the lifeboat then reached a crucial point of capsize the ballast water would transfer through valves to a righting tank built into the port side. If the capsize was to the starboard side of the lifeboat, the water shift started when an angle of 165° was reached. This would push the boat into completing a full 360° roll. If the capsize was to the port side, the water transfer started at 110°. In this case the weight of water combined with the weight of machinery aboard the lifeboat usually managed to stop the roll and allow the lifeboat to bounce back to upright.

=== Hull construction ===
The hull of the Lloyds II was constructed from African mahogany built with two skins. Each skin was diagonally laid with a layer of calico laid between the skins. The outer skin was 3/8 in (9.5 mm)thick with the inner skin being 1/4 in (6.4 mm) thick. The keel was iron and weighed 1.154 long tons (1.173 t). The hull was divided into eleven watertight compartments. The lifeboat was 37 feet 0 inches (11.28 m) in length and 11 feet 6 inches (3.51 m) in beam and displaced 12 long tons 1 cwt (27,000 lb or 12.2 t) when fully laden with crew and gear. She was fitted with twin Perkins P4M, 43 brake horsepower (32 kW) diesel engine, which moved her over the water at 8 knots (15 km/h; 9.2 mph). The wheelhouse was positioned amidships.

== History ==
Lloyds II was the second Oakley-class lifeboat to be stationed at Sheringham. Lloyds II was also the last offshore lifeboat to serve at Sheringham lifeboat station. She had previously been stationed at Ilfracombe in Devon from July 1966 to June 1990 where she had saved 116 lives. The Ilfracombe RNLI station had been allocated a new Mersey class lifeboat called Spirit of Derbyshire in July 1990. Lloyds II was sent to Sheringham temporarily until the RNLI changed the type of lifeboat coverage it required in this part of North Norfolk. The lifeboat was brought from Ilfracombe to Great Yarmouth by road on 6 October where she was re-floated. The Norfolk weather kept her in port for a day as a force seven storm raged. The next day a crew from Sheringham came to Yarmouth to take her round the coast to her new home. The voyage proved to be an eventful start to Lloyds II's career at Sheringham. As the lifeboat left Great Yarmouth she was asked to assist the yacht Lady of Thanet whose engines had failed and was in danger of being swept on to Corton Sands south of Yarmouth. Lloyds II took the vessel in tow, relieving the Yarmouth and Gorleston inshore lifeboat Joseph B. Press and proceeding back to Great Yarmouth. Just outside the harbour the tow rope parted and the Joseph B. Press helped to reinstate the tow. The lifeboat then proceeded on to Town Hall Quay with the Lady of Thanet.

=== Last of the offshores ===
Lloyds II was on station at Sheringham for 18 months during which time she was launched to service a total of twelve times. Her last launch took place on 23 March 1992 when she went to the assistance of three Weybourne crab boats. She passed lifejackets to two of the boats and escorted the three back to the safety of the shore. This was not only the last rescue carried out by Lloyds II but also the last rescue from Sheringham by an offshore lifeboat. The RNLI had decided that the new lifeboat cover from Sheringham would be carried forward with an Atlantic 21 class inshore lifeboat.

=== Fate ===
Lloyds II left the Sheringham boathouse for the last time on 18 April 1992. Her crew of eight set off down the coast to Lowestoft, escorted by the new Atlantic 21 lifeboat B-536 (Unnamed). Her launch carriage was sent to be with Sheringham's previous Oakley The Manchester Unity of Oddfellows for both to be preserved for posterity. Lloyds II was eventually broken up at Rainham in August 1993.

Preceded by RNLB The Manchester Unity of Oddfellows (ON 960)	RNLB Lloyds II (ON 986); 1991 to 1992	Succeeded by RNLB Atlantic 21 (B 536)
