= RNLB The Oddfellows =

Lifeboat

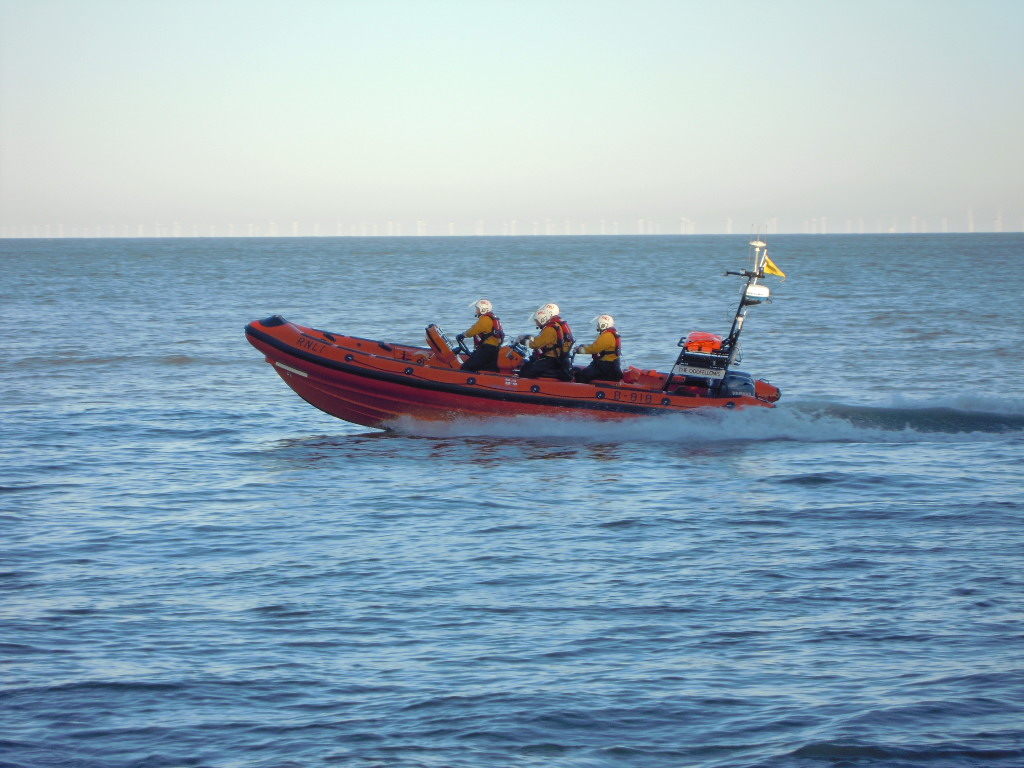
- The Oddfellows (B-818)

History

United Kingdom
- Name: The Oddfellows
- Owner: Royal National Lifeboat Institution (RNLI)
- Builder: Inshore Lifeboat Centre, Cowes
- Official Number: B-818
- Donor: Gift of the Independent Order of Odd Fellows, Manchester Unity Friendly Society
- Stations: Sheringham
- Cost: £135,000
- Laid down: 2007
- Acquired: 2007
- In service: 11 July 2007

General characteristics
- Class & type: Atlantic 85 rigid-inflatable lifeboat
- Displacement: 1.8 tonnes
- Length: 8.44 m (27.7 ft)overall
- Beam: 2.85 m (9.4 ft)
- Draught: 0.53 m (1.7 ft)
- Installed power: 115 hp (86 kW) each engine
- Propulsion: Two inversion-proof Yamaha four-stroke outboard engines
- Speed: 35 knots (40 mph; 65 km/h)
- Range: 2.5 hours
- Crew: 4
- Notes: Launched by tractor aboard a trolley

RNLB The Oddfellows (B-818) is the current rigid-inflatable inshore lifeboat on station at the English coastal town of Sheringham in the county of Norfolk in the United Kingdom.

== State-of-the-art inshore lifeboat ==
The Oddfellows arrived on station 11 July 2007 to replace RNLB Manchester Unity of Oddfellows (B-702). This latest version of the Atlantic 85 class had been in development by the RNLI since 2004. This lifeboat at the time of its arrival in Sheringham was the most modern state-of-the-art class of inshore lifeboat in the RNLI fleet. The new lifeboat was funded by the Manchester Unity Independent Order of Oddfellows, from which the lifeboat once again took her name. The organization also provided £68,000 for a new drive-on, drive-off launch and recovery carriage required for this larger boat. This new apparatus had a number of improved features such as illumination, and an enhanced hydraulic lifting device which, during rough seas, can be raised to an appropriate height enabling the boat to launch from the slipway at hightide without the bow being angled into the water. A wing-tank on either side of the trailer supplies each outboard engine with enough water to allow the engines to be started and warmed up on the slipway before launching.

=== Design ===
The Oddfellows is 8.44 m (27.7 ft) long and has a beam of 2.8 m (9.2 ft) and with the engine raised a draught of just 0.53 m (1.7 ft). The propulsion is provided by two Yamaha inversion-proof 115 horsepower (86 kW) four-stroke petrol engines. The motors are capable of pushing the lifeboat through the water at speeds in excess of 35 knots (65 km/h; 40 mph). The lifeboat is launched with a crew of four aboard and uses a Do-Do (drive on - drive off) trolley pushed directly into the sea by a Talus MB-4H amphibious tractor via the station slipway.

=== Hull ===
The state-of-the-art carbon fibre hull structure has a foam core laminate that minimises the internal structure and helps the hull maintain its overall stiffness, and has very good impact absorption and recovers its shape after high impact loads which occur when the lifeboat rides through the waves at high speeds. The carbon fibre is impervious to attack by marine organisms and easily moulded into the complex shape needed to form the deep 'V' shape at the bow. The shape then falls away to a flat run to aft of the hull. This deep 'V' bow shape gives the boat excellent directional stability when underway and the flat run assists in getting the boat up on the plane quickly and on the occasions that the boat needs to be beached enables the lifeboat to sit upright.

=== Ballast ===
Located in the bow, water-filled ballast tanks provide the lifeboat with more stability and can be filled and emptied manually while at sea. This is achieved by use of a handle located near the helmsman which lowers a scoop to fill the tanks while the boat is underway. There are two fuel tanks, which are embedded in polystyrene, located on the port and starboard sides of the hull. The tanks can fuel each engine independently or one tank can fuel both engines if needed. The Oddfellows is also fitted with a manually operated righting system achieved by means of a gas buoyancy bag mounted on a framework above the engines, which, combined with her inversion proofed engines, allows her to remain operational even after capsize.

=== Onboard equipment ===
The lifeboats onboard equipment includes the latest in electronic equipment including radar, a chart plotter and VHF radio direction finding equipment. Running around the outside of the hull is an inflatable tube constructed of tough Nylon weave. This tube, or sponson is made up of separate compartments. If one of the compartments is accidentally punctured then the others will remain inflated. Should all the compartments become compromised the lifeboat would still be capable of floating without the sponson. The sponson allowing the boat to operate in rough seas and provides fendering when going alongside other vessels.

=== Central console ===
There are a total of four seats on the lifeboat but the boat is capable of carrying over twenty people if necessary. At the heart of the lifeboat there is a console which houses the helmsman's controls. This console also houses the illuminated compass, depth sounder, and various switches for controlling navigation lights. The engine start and stop switching is also located there along with individual tachometers motor high temperature warning lights. Behind the console is the seating for the crew, with the helmsman at the front, radio operator behind him to the port side, navigator to starboard and the fourth man's seat behind them. To secure the crew, each seat has foot straps fitted to the deck. The lifeboat's water-tight VHF radio, loudspeaker system and hand-held microphone are located on the portside just behind the helmsmen position, although this can all be operated by a built-in radio speaker in the helmsman's helmet. The lifeboat also has a Global Positioning System and radar control to a display screen. The system provides the lifeboat crew with co-ordinates, estimated speed, and guidance to programmable waypoints. The Oddfellows also has DF radio which will indicate the compass heading that a radio contact is coming from.

Below the seats, there is access to the petrol tank filler caps along with a locker for gear such as a foot pump and an aerosol fog horn. A set of flares is stored aboard with red for distress and white flares which slowly descends on a parachute illuminating a large area. In case of technical difficulties with the navigation equipment, the crew can revert to using a set of waterproof charts of the local area which are also stored in pockets in the console. To the rear of the console is the 35 m towing rope on a reel which is used in conjunction with the tow bar to tow stricken vessels to safety.

=== Stern roll-bar ===
To the stern of The Oddfellows there is a roll-bar or A-frame which houses and supports the self-righting bag at the top, navigation lights and radio aerial and uplink to the GPS. This roll-bar would also give some protection to the crew, motors and console should capsize in shallow water. The self-righting airbag is inflated using the compressed gas cylinders located at the base of the roll-bar. In the event of a capsize the mechanism is initiated with a handle located on either side of the boat outside of the stern, which when operated would cause contents of one of the gas bottles to inflate the airbag which will then cause the boat to roll the right way up.

== Service history ==
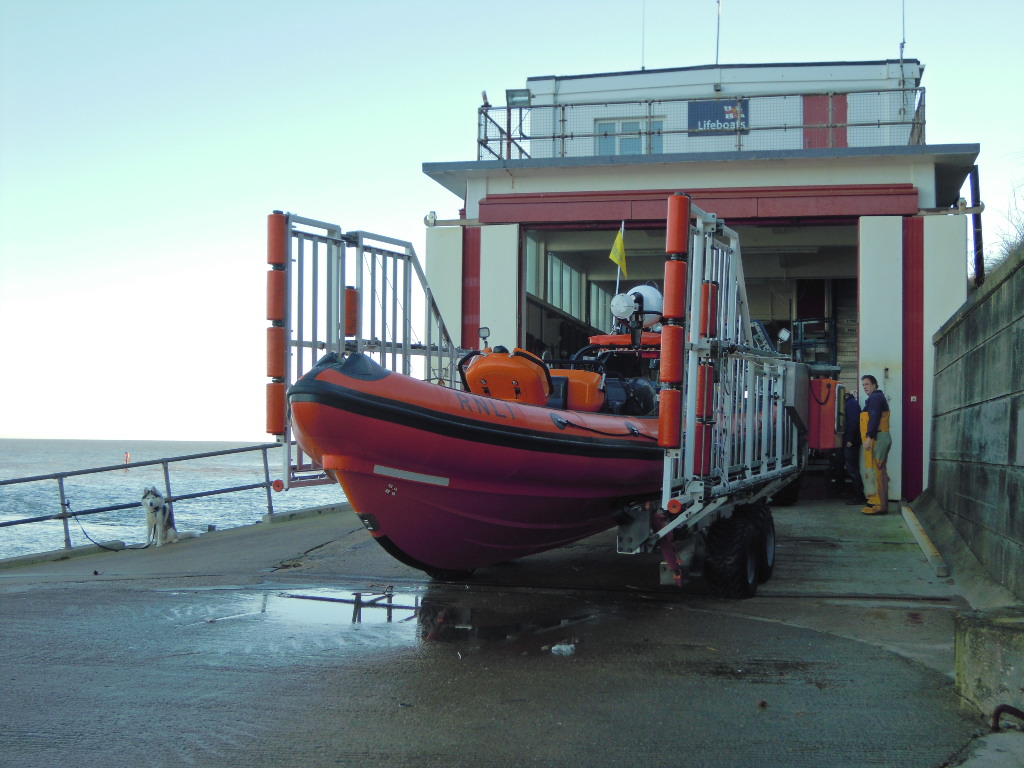
The Oddfellows outside the station just before launch

The Oddfellows was formally named at a ceremony which took place outside the boathouse on 15 September 2007. The ceremony was attended by the helmsman, crew, station officials who all lined up in front of the lifeboat watched by over 100 members of the Manchester Unity of Oddfellows and members of the public. The lifeboat was blessed by the Rev. Mike Mcgill. Alison Adamson, secretary of the East Anglian group of the Manchester Unity of Oddfellows named the lifeboat and poured champagne across her bows.

The lifeboat was then launched on a demonstration before a large crowd who watched on.

=== First service ===
On 29 July 2007 The Oddfellows first service. This had actually taken place before her official launch and naming ceremony. The lifeboat was already at sea on an exercise when the Yarmouth Coastguard engaged her into an investigation of a reported capsized inflatable dinghy about one metre long, found on the east beach at Sheringham. The lifeboat search the inshore waters from Sheringham in a westerly direction as far as Weybourne but nothing was found. Eventually the Coastguard beach team established that no one was with the inflatable and that there was no immediate danger and so the lifeboat returned to station.

== Record of service ==
The Oddfellows B 818
Date	Casualty	Lives saved
2007
14 August	Sailing Dinghy Heron, one person and craft brought in.	
18 August	8 Divers lost contact of their Boat, at Happisburgh	2
29 August	small sailing dinghy capsized, Search undertaken, Survivor found safe	
6 September	Fishing Vessel Blue Boy, one person and craft brought in.	
31 December	Fishing Vessel Tom Kit,	
2008
7 January	Fishing vessel Lisa Dianna, escort the boat through the surf back to beach	
11 April	Person on stone groyne armouring on Sheringham seafront, gave help and stood by	
6 July	Motor Boat Tripaloo, Tow the craft in and landed six.	
12 July	Fishing vessel, escorted craft	
30 July	small inflatable boat with 3 persons. escorted back to the shore.	
2 August	Drifting Dinghy, Search called off after enquiries	
22 August	Fishing Vessel Blue Boy, one person and craft brought in.	
21 September	Cat (feline variety) trapped on rock groyne, gave help, rescued cat	
2009
10 May	Fishing boat Providence II, Gave help, escorted home	
22 June	Two jet skis, Broke down Gave help, towed ashore	
21 July	Inflatable dingy 2 persons aboard, with engine failed and deflating	2
6 August	sinking inflatable with one person, rescued person	1
19 August	2 swimmers approximately ½ mile seaward of Sheringham, escorted back to shore	
20 August	inflatable craft and 3 young persons on board, escorted back to shore	
18 September	Fishing vessel of Sheringham, broken down, Towed to shore.	
2010
5 August	2 people trapped on stone groyne armouring, Sheringham seafront. returned to shore	2
10 September	Fishing Vessel Blue Boy, gearbox failure, escorted back to shore.	
17 October	Survey vessel Ocean Dredger, taking on water, stood by	
2011
14 May	trimaran yacht Swift, escorted to Old Hythe	
3 September	small inflatable with 2 people, Picked up by fishing vessel, Escorted both back to shore	
30 September	small inflatable with 4 people, drifting, rescued	4
10 October	Speed Boat with engine failure, taken in to tow	
2012
21 September	3 people thrown from jet ski, no assistance required	
2013
29 April	2 swimmers thought to be in trouble, escorted back to shore	
5 May	swimmer thought to be in trouble, stood by	
9 May	attended fishing vessel Mia Blue, took off injured crewman	
1 August	3 swimmers with a broken-down jet ski, returned to shore with jet ski in tow	

== See also ==
- Talus MB-4H amphibious tractor
- Talus Atlantic 85 DO-DO launch carriage

Preceded by RNLB Manchester Unity of Oddfellows (B-702)	RNLB The Oddfellows (B-818); 2007 to date	Succeeded by Pending
