= Oakley-class lifeboat =

Former RNLI lifeboat class

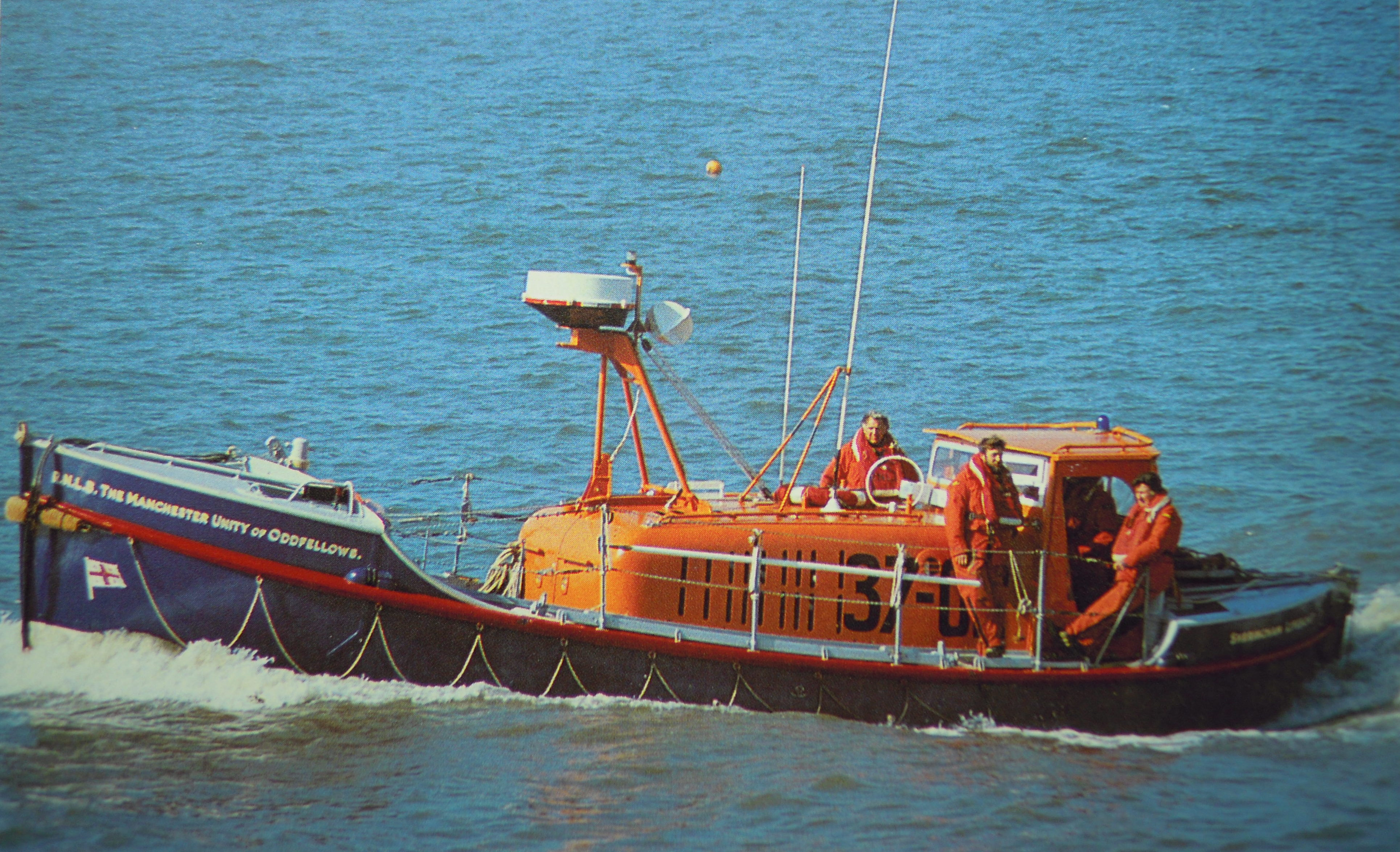
- RNLB Manchester Unity of Oddfellows (ON 960)

Class overview
- Builders: William Osborne, Littlehampton; J. Samuel White, Cowes; Groves and Guttridge, Cowes; Herd and McKenzie, Buckie; Morris and Lorimer, Sandbank, Argyll
- Operators: Royal National Lifeboat Institution
- Preceded by: Liverpool / Watson
- Succeeded by: Rother / Solent
- Cost: 37ft: £27,000–£38,000; 48ft 6in: £40,000–£72,000
- Built: 1958–1971
- In service: 1958–1993
- Completed: 37ft: 26; 48ft 6in: 5
- Retired: 31
- Preserved: Museum / Display 11; Afloat 6; Awaiting restoration 3

General characteristics 37-foot
- Displacement: 12 long tons (12 t)
- Length: 37 ft (11.28 m)
- Beam: 11 ft 6 in (3.51 m)
- Draught: 3 ft 4 in (1.02 m)
- Propulsion: 2 × 43-hp Perkins P4M; 2 x 52-hp Ford Thornycroft; 2 x Parsons Porbeagle
- Speed: 8 knots (9.2 mph; 15 km/h)
- Complement: 7

General characteristics 48-foot 6in
- Displacement: 30 long tons (30 t)
- Length: 48 ft 6 in (14.78 m)
- Beam: 14 ft 0 in (4.27 m)
- Draught: 4 ft 4 in (1.32 m)
- Propulsion: 2 × 110bhp Gardner 6LX
- Speed: 8 knots (9.2 mph; 15 km/h)
- Complement: 8

The Oakley-class lifeboat refers to two types of self-righting lifeboat operated by the Royal National Lifeboat Institution (RNLI) around the coast of the United Kingdom and Ireland between 1958 and 1993. The 37-foot (11.3 m) Oakley was designed for carriage launching, while the larger 48-foot-6-inch (14.8 m) version was designed for slipway launching or to lie afloat. During their service they saved a combined total of 1,456 lives in 3,734 rescue launches.

The class is known by the name of its designer, RNLI naval architect Richard Oakley.

== History ==
During the first half of the twentieth century the RNLI had equipped its lifeboat stations with motor lifeboats designed by G L Watson and, later, J R Barnett. Both these men had designed boats that were generally stable but, unlike the earlier Peake-class boats, were not self-righting. Part of the problem was that motor lifeboats were much heavier than pulling and sailing boats, which could be packed with cork to make them buoyant. Richard Oakley worked out how to use shifting water ballast to create a self-righting motor lifeboat.

Oakley's 37-foot (11 m) prototype was launched in 1958 and placed in service at Scarborough. Production boats started to be built in 1961 and in 1963 the prototype 48-foot-6-inch (14.78 m) boat was launched and sent to Yarmouth. The last Barnett-class was built in 1960 and the final Watson-class in 1963, after which Oakleys were the only all-weather lifeboats put into service for the next four years.

== Design ==
The Oakley was designed as a self-righting boat. The design combined great stability with the ability to self-right in the event of it capsizing. This was achieved by a system of shifting water ballast. The system worked by the lifeboat taking on one and half tons of sea water into a tank built into the base of the hull at launching. If the lifeboat then reached a crucial point of capsize the ballast water would transfer through valves to a righting tank built into the port side. If the capsize was to the starboard side of the lifeboat, the water shift started when an angle of 165° was reached. This would push the boat into completing a full 360° roll. If the capsize was to the port side, the water transfer started at 110°. In this case the weight of water combined with the weight of machinery aboard the lifeboat usually managed to stop the roll and allow the lifeboat to come back to upright. The tank was emptied when the ship was taken out of the sea. There was a problem with damp sand left in the tank after the water was drained, which caused weak electrolytic action that eroded the copper nails which held the wooden hulls together.

The hull of the Oakley class was constructed from two wooden skins with a layer of calico between. After several years it was found that the calico absorbed water, which caused softening of the wood around the copper nails. This led to a series of surveys in the late 1980s and the withdrawal of some boats and replanking of others. The skins were made from diagonally laid African mahogany planks. The outer one was 0.375 inches (9.5 mm) thick with the inner 0.25 inches (6.4 mm). The keel was iron and weighed 1.154 tons. The hull was divided into eleven watertight compartments. Two sizes were built. Most boats were 37 feet (11.3 m) in length and 11 feet 6 inches (3.51 m) in beam, displacing 12.05 tons when fully laden with crew and gear. Five larger boats were built that were 48 feet 6 inches (14.78 m) long and 14 feet (4.3 m) wide.

== The 48ft 6in Oakley ==
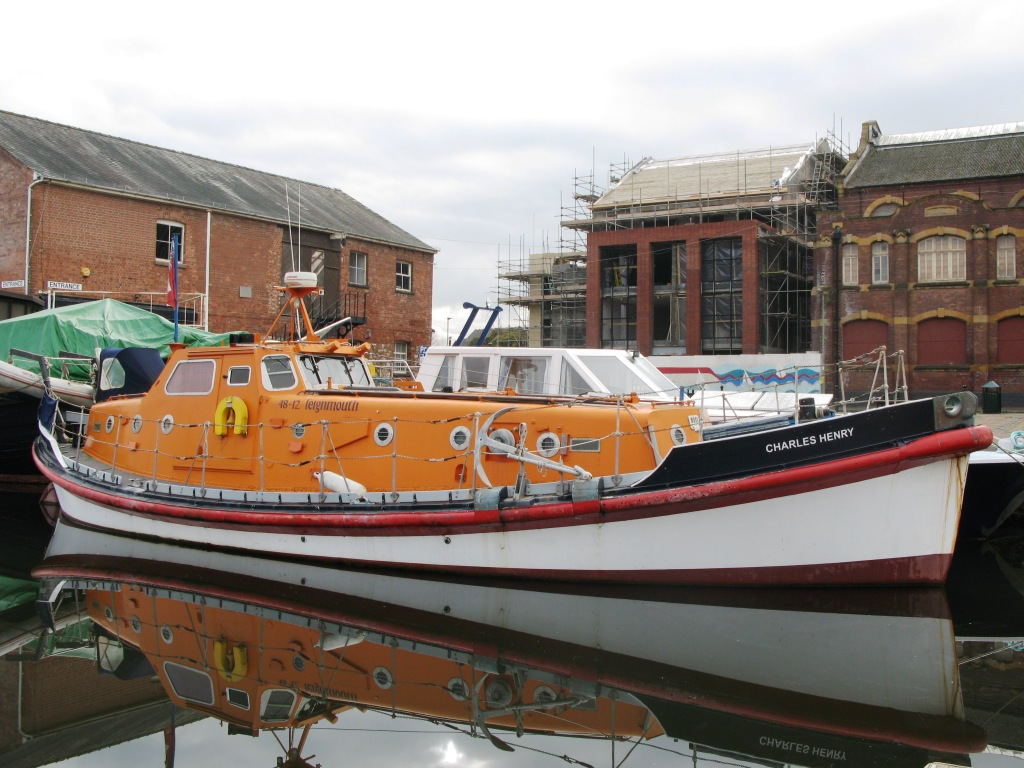
48-12 Charles Henry in private use (Exeter, 2007)

After five years production of the 37-foot boat, the RNLI decided to extend the water ballast self-righting principal to a larger boat suitable for slipway launching and lying afloat. In 1962 a prototype boat was built, 48-01 Earl and Countess Howe (ON 968) and in appearance it resembled an extended 42ft Watson-class with a long tapering superstructure running forward from an aft cockpit which was covered, but open to the stern. The boat's water ballast system used 2 3/4 tons of water compared to 1 1/2 tons in the smaller boats. Power came from two 110 bhp Gardner 6LX six cylinder diesel engines, the redesigned and uprated version of the engine fitted to the last ten 52ft Barnett class boats. Displacing 29 tons and built at a cost of £40,000, RNLB The Earl and Countess Howe (ON 968) was the first RNLI lifeboat to be built with radar installed and went on station at Yarmouth in February 1963.

It was four years before further examples were built, by which time a major redesign of the superstructure had resulted in the Mk. II version. In this an enclosed wheelhouse was positioned amidships, accessed by sliding doors on either side at the forward end. Behind the wheelhouse was an aft cabin which could accommodate a loaded stretcher. Initially, radio aerials were rigged between the foremast and a bipod mast at the back of the aft cabin, on the roof of which the radar scanner was mounted on a pylon. Later, the masts were removed and twin pole aerials fitted to the aft cabin just behind the wheelhouse with a small tripod mast fitted to the wheelhouse roof. RNLB Ruby and Arthur Reed (ON 990) went on station at Cromer in March 1967, followed by RNLB James and Catherine Macfarlane (ON 989) which took up duties at Padstow in July 1967.

Attention now turned to a steel-hulled development of the 48-foot 6in Oakley which would dispense with the complex water ballast system and achieve its self-righting capability from a watertight superstructure. This emerged as the Solent class and initial orders for eight boats were placed with Operational Numbers following on from the Oakleys (48-004 to 48-011, the three digit second part of the number indicating a metal hull). Two final Oakleys were then ordered, taking Operational Numbers 48-12 and 48-13. The first of these, 48-12 Charles Henry (ON 1015) went on station at Selsey in January 1969, a few months before the first Solent. 48-13 Princess Marina (ON 1016) began service at Wick in July 1970.

Like the smaller boats, the 48-foot 6in Oakleys were prone to hull deterioration through electrolysis and were not considered for sale for further use. Initially, all five boats were put on display at various locations, but two, 48-01 and 48-13 were subsequently broken up. After ten years on display, 48-12 was sold to a private owner who removed the water ballast system and put the boat back on the water, leaving 48-02 and 48-03 on public display at Lands End and Hythe Marina respectively. 48-02, James and Catherine MacFarlane, after being out in the open at Lands End since 1988, was sold to a private owner in July 2016 and moved to Berkshire for restoration. The boat is now fully restored, based at St Mary's, Isles of Scilly.

== Oakley fleet ==
=== 37-foot boats ===
ON (Note: ON is the RNLI's Official Number of the boat.)	Op. No. (Note: Op. No. is the RNLI's Operational Number of the boat carried on the hull.)	Name	Built	In service	Stations	Comments
942	37-01	J. G. Graves of Sheffield	1958	1958–1978	Scarborough	(Note: Gift of J. G. Graves Charitable Trust, built by William Osborne of Littlehampton, with twin 43-hp Perkins P4M diesel engines, costing £26,700.) Sold 1994. Preserved since April 1996 in the RNLI Heritage Collection at Chatham Historic Dockyard, December 2025.
942	37-01	J. G. Graves of Sheffield	1958	1979–1988	Relief fleet	Sold 1994. Preserved since April 1996 in the RNLI Heritage Collection at Chatham Historic Dockyard, December 2025.
942	37-01	J. G. Graves of Sheffield	1958	1988–1991	Clogherhead	Sold 1994. Preserved since April 1996 in the RNLI Heritage Collection at Chatham Historic Dockyard, December 2025.
942	37-01	J. G. Graves of Sheffield	1958	1991–1992	Relief fleet	Sold 1994. Preserved since April 1996 in the RNLI Heritage Collection at Chatham Historic Dockyard, December 2025.
942	37-01	J. G. Graves of Sheffield	1958	1992–1993	Newcastle	Sold 1994. Preserved since April 1996 in the RNLI Heritage Collection at Chatham Historic Dockyard, December 2025.
960	37-02	Manchester Unity of Oddfellows	1961	1961–1990	Sheringham	(Note: Gift of the Independent Order of Oddfellows Manchester Unity, built by William Osborne of Littlehampton, with twin 43-hp Perkins P4M diesel engines, costing £28,500. Twin Thornycroft 52-hp engines fitted in 1982.) Sold April 1991. Preserved at The Mo Sheringham Museum.
961	37-03	Calouste Gulbenkian	1961	1962–1969	Weston-super-Mare	(Note: Gift of the Independent Order of Oddfellows Manchester Unity, built by J. Samuel White of Cowes, with twin 43-hp Perkins P4M diesel engines, costing £34,000.) Sold November 1991. Under restoration at Donaghadee, December 2025.
961	37-03	Calouste Gulbenkian	1961	1970–1990	Relief fleet	Sold November 1991. Under restoration at Donaghadee, December 2025.
961	37-03	Calouste Gulbenkian	1961	1990–1991	New Quay	Sold November 1991. Under restoration at Donaghadee, December 2025.
966	37-04	Robert and Dorothy Hardcastle	1962	1962–1968	Boulmer	(Note: Legacy of Mr H. R. Hardcastle, built by Groves and Guttridge of Cowes, with twin 43-hp Perkins P4M diesel engines, costing £33,000.) Sold April 1993. Partially restored, on display at the North East Land, Sea and Air Museum at Sunderland, December 2025.
966	37-04	Robert and Dorothy Hardcastle	1962	1968–1991	Filey	Sold April 1993. Partially restored, on display at the North East Land, Sea and Air Museum at Sunderland, December 2025.
966	37-04	Robert and Dorothy Hardcastle	1962	1991–1993	Relief fleet	Sold April 1993. Partially restored, on display at the North East Land, Sea and Air Museum at Sunderland, December 2025.
972	37-05	The Will and Fanny Kirby	1963	1963–1979	Seaham	(Note: Legacy of the Mr and Mrs W. L. Kirby Benevolent Fund, built by William Osborne of Littlehampton, with twin 43-hp Perkins P4M diesel engines, costing £33,000. Twin Thornycroft 52-hp engines fitted in 1982.) Sold 1993. Preserved since April 1996 in the RNLI Heritage Collection at Chatham Historic Dockyard, December 2025.
972	37-05	The Will and Fanny Kirby	1963	1979–1983	Relief fleet	Sold 1993. Preserved since April 1996 in the RNLI Heritage Collection at Chatham Historic Dockyard, December 2025.
972	37-05	The Will and Fanny Kirby	1963	1983–1993	Flamborough	Sold 1993. Preserved since April 1996 in the RNLI Heritage Collection at Chatham Historic Dockyard, December 2025.
973	37-06	Fairlight	1964	1964–1988	Hastings	(Note: Legacies of Mrs Wood and Mrs Dudman, built by William Osborne of Littlehampton, with twin 52-hp Parsons Porbeagle diesel engines, costing £33,000.) Sold October 1994. At Blakeney Harbour, December 2025.
973	37-06	Fairlight	1964	1988–1989	Relief fleet	Sold October 1994. At Blakeney Harbour, December 2025.
973	37-06	Fairlight	1964	1989–1990	St Ives	Sold October 1994. At Blakeney Harbour, December 2025.
973	37-06	Fairlight	1964	1990–1991	Relief fleet	Sold October 1994. At Blakeney Harbour, December 2025.
973	37-06	Fairlight	1964	1991–1992	New Quay	Sold October 1994. At Blakeney Harbour, December 2025.
974	37-07	Jane Hay	1964	1964–1974	St Abbs	(Note: Legacies of Mrs Erskine, and Miss Smith, plus a gift from Miss Gillespie, built by William Osborne of Littlehampton, with twin 52-hp Parsons Porbeagle diesel engines, costing £31,848.) Sold and dismantled at Arklow, August 1995. Hull remains at Tinahely, County Wicklow, April 2019.
974	37-07	Jane Hay	1964	1974–1980	Relief fleet	Sold and dismantled at Arklow, August 1995. Hull remains at Tinahely, County Wicklow, April 2019.
974	37-07	Jane Hay	1964	1980–1992	Newcastle	Sold and dismantled at Arklow, August 1995. Hull remains at Tinahely, County Wicklow, April 2019.
975	37-08	Sir James Knott	1963	1963–1969	Cullercoats	(Note: Gift of the Sir James Knott Trust, plus RNLI funds, built by Groves and Guttridge of Cowes, with twin 52-hp Parsons Porbeagle diesel engines, costing £33,000.) Sold 1990. Preserved at Kirkleatham Old Hall Museum, Redcar, December 2025.
975	37-08	Sir James Knott	1963	1969–1972	Relief fleet	Sold 1990. Preserved at Kirkleatham Old Hall Museum, Redcar, December 2025.
975	37-08	Sir James Knott	1963	1972–1985	Redcar	Sold 1990. Preserved at Kirkleatham Old Hall Museum, Redcar, December 2025.
975	37-08	Sir James Knott	1963	1985–1990	Relief fleet	Sold 1990. Preserved at Kirkleatham Old Hall Museum, Redcar, December 2025.
976	37-09	Lilly Wainwright	1964	1964–1990	Llandudno	(Note: Legacy of Mr Wainwright, plus gift from the Arthur Jowett Fund, built by Groves and Guttridge of Cowes, with twin 52-hp Parsons Porbeagle diesel engines, costing £33,000.) Sold 1993 to Cobh Heritage Trust. Fully restored, at Crosshaven Boatyard, Cobh, June 2025.
976	37-09	Lilly Wainwright	1964	1990–1992	Kilmore Quay	Sold 1993 to Cobh Heritage Trust. Fully restored, at Crosshaven Boatyard, Cobh, June 2025.
977	37-10	Charles Fred Grantham	1964	1964–1990	Skegness	(Note: Legacies of Mr Montford and Miss Dearden, built by Groves and Guttridge of Cowes, with twin 52-hp Parsons Porbeagle diesel engines, costing £33,000.) Sold 1993. Broken up at Wareham, Dorset, August 1993.
977	37-10	Charles Fred Grantham	1964	1990–1991	Scarborough	Sold 1993. Broken up at Wareham, Dorset, August 1993.
977	37-10	Charles Fred Grantham	1964	1991–1992	Relief fleet	Sold 1993. Broken up at Wareham, Dorset, August 1993.
978	37-11	The Royal Thames	1964	1964–1969	Caister	(Note: Legacy of Mr Forster, gift of Miss Ellison and Mr Jackson, plus RNLI funds, built by J. Samuel White of Cowes, with twin 52-hp Parsons Porbeagle diesel engines, costing £31,749.) Sold 1994. Stored inland, 5 mi (8.0 km) from Cromer, December 2023.
978	37-11	The Royal Thames	1964	1970–1978	Runswick	Sold 1994. Stored inland, 5 mi (8.0 km) from Cromer, December 2023.
978	37-11	The Royal Thames	1964	1979–1991	Pwllheli	Sold 1994. Stored inland, 5 mi (8.0 km) from Cromer, December 2023.
978	37-11	The Royal Thames	1964	1991–1993	Clogherhead	Sold 1994. Stored inland, 5 mi (8.0 km) from Cromer, December 2023.
979	37-12	James and Catherine Macfarlane	1964	1964–1967	Relief fleet	(Note: Legacy of Mr R. F. Macfarlane, and RNLI funds, built by J. Samuel White of Cowes, with twin 52-hp Parsons Porbeagle diesel engines, costing £33,000.); Renamed Amelia in 1967.
979	37-12	Amelia	1964	1967–1978	Relief fleet	(Note: Legacy of Mrs Borland.) Sold February 1992. Preserved at Charlestown Museum until closure in 2019. Awaiting restoration at South Ferriby Marina, August 2025.
979	37-12	Amelia	1964	1978–1991	Scarborough	Sold February 1992. Preserved at Charlestown Museum until closure in 2019. Awaiting restoration at South Ferriby Marina, August 2025.
980	37-13	William Henry and Mary King	1964	1964–1967	Cromer No.2	(Note: Legacy of Miss King, built by J. Samuel White of Cowes, with twin 52-hp Parsons Porbeagle diesel engines, costing £33,000.)Sold 1990. Located in playground, Drayton Park Primary School, Highbury, London.
980	37-13	William Henry and Mary King	1964	1967–1988	Bridlington	Sold 1990. Located in playground, Drayton Park Primary School, Highbury, London.
980	37-13	William Henry and Mary King	1964	1989–1990	North Sunderland	Sold 1990. Located in playground, Drayton Park Primary School, Highbury, London.
981	37-14	Mary Pullman	1964	1965–1989	Kirkcudbright	(Note: Gift of Sir Derek Wheeler, Bt, built by William Osborne of Littlehampton, with twin 52-hp Parsons Porbeagle diesel engines, costing £33,000.) Sold 1991. On display since March 1993, at Baytree Garden Centre, Weston, Spalding, December 2023.
982	37-15	Ernest Tom Neathercoat	1965	1965–1990	Wells-next-the-Sea	(Note: Legacy of Mr Nethercoat plus Wm. Osborne, built by William Osborne of Littlehampton, with twin 52-hp Parsons Porbeagle diesel engines, costing £34,000.) Sold 1992. Fully restored display/training boat at Wells-next-the-Sea, December 2025.
982	37-15	Ernest Tom Neathercoat	1965	1990–1991	North Sunderland	Sold 1992. Fully restored display/training boat at Wells-next-the-Sea, December 2025.
983	37-16	The Doctors	1965	1965–1991	Anstruther	(Note: Gift of Dr Nora Allen, built by William Osborne of Littlehampton, with twin 52-hp Parsons Porbeagle diesel engines, costing £34,000.) Sold 1993. Under restoration at Donaghadee, December 2025.
983	37-16	The Doctors	1965	1991–1993	Relief fleet	Sold 1993. Under restoration at Donaghadee, December 2025.
984	37-17	Mary Joicey	1966	1966–1981	Newbiggin	(Note: Legacy of Mrs Joicey, built by Herd and McKenzie of Buckie, with twin 52-hp Parsons Porbeagle diesel engines, costing £37,000.) Sold 1989. On display at Newbiggin Maritime Centre, December 2025.
984	37-17	Mary Joicey	1966	1981–1985	Relief fleet	Sold 1989. On display at Newbiggin Maritime Centre, December 2025.
984	37-17	Mary Joicey	1966	1985–1986	Redcar	Sold 1989. On display at Newbiggin Maritime Centre, December 2025.
984	37-17	Mary Joicey	1966	1986–1988	Relief fleet	Sold 1989. On display at Newbiggin Maritime Centre, December 2025.
984	37-17	Mary Joicey	1966	1988–1989	Hastings	Sold 1989. On display at Newbiggin Maritime Centre, December 2025.
984	37-17	Mary Joicey	1966	1989	St Ives	Sold 1989. On display at Newbiggin Maritime Centre, December 2025.
985	37-18	Valentine Wyndham-Quin	1967	1968–1984	Clacton-on-Sea	(Note: Legacy of Mr Harris, plus an anonymous gift, built by Herd and McKenzie of Buckie, with twin 52-hp Parsons Porbeagle diesel engines, costing £37,000.) Sold 1988. On display since July 1995 at The Lifeboat House, The Green, Harwich, December 2025.
985	37-18	Valentine Wyndham-Quin	1967	1984–1988	Clogherhead	Sold 1988. On display since July 1995 at The Lifeboat House, The Green, Harwich, December 2025.
986	37-19	Lloyds II	1966	1966–1990	Ilfracombe	(Note: Gift of the members of Lloyd's of London, built by Morris & Lorimer of Sandbank, Argyll, with twin 52-hp Parsons Porbeagle diesel engines, costing £34,000.) Sold in 1992. Broken up at Crescent Marine, Rainham, Kent, 1993.
986	37-19	Lloyds II	1966	1990–1992	Sheringham	Sold in 1992. Broken up at Crescent Marine, Rainham, Kent, 1993.
991	37-20	Edward and Mary Lester	1967	1967–1989	North Sunderland	(Note: Gift and legacy of Mrs Lester, built by William Osborne of Littlehampton, with twin 52-hp Parsons Porbeagle diesel engines, costing £37,500.) Sold 1989. Broken up at Southampton in 1989.
992	37-21	Frank Penfold Marshall	1968	1968–1989	St Ives	(Note: Gift of Mrs Marshall, built by William Osborne of Littlehampton, with twin 52-hp Parsons Porbeagle diesel engines, costing £37,000.) Sold 1989. Broken up at Southampton in 1989.
993	37-22	Har Lil	1968	1968–1990	Rhyl	(Note: Legacy of Miss Watt, built by William Osborne of Littlehampton, with twin 52-hp Parsons Porbeagle diesel engines, costing £37,000.) Sold December 1991. Restored, at Porth Penrhyn, Bangor, Gwynedd, September 2025.
994	37-23	The Vincent Nesfield	1969	1969–1972	Relief fleet	(Note: Gift of Mrs Giddins Fund, and legacies of Mr Cowls and Mr Ringer, built by William Osborne of Littlehampton, with twin 52-hp Parsons Porbeagle diesel engines, costing £38,000.) Sold 1991. Broken up at Arklow in December 1991.
994	37-23	The Vincent Nesfield	1969	1972–1973	Port Erin	Sold 1991. Broken up at Arklow in December 1991.
994	37-23	The Vincent Nesfield	1969	1973–1988	Relief fleet	Sold 1991. Broken up at Arklow in December 1991.
994	37-23	The Vincent Nesfield	1969	1989–1991	Kilmore Quay	Sold 1991. Broken up at Arklow in December 1991.
995	37-24	James Ball Ritchie	1970	1970–1991	Ramsey	(Note: Gift of Mrs Ritchie, built by William Osborne of Littlehampton, with twin 52-hp Parsons Porbeagle diesel engines, costing £38,000.) Sold 1992. Broken up at McAlisters boatyard, Dumbarton, September 1992.
996	37-25	Birds Eye	1970	1970–1990	New Quay	(Note: Gift of Birds Eye Foods Ltd, built by William Osborne of Littlehampton, with twin 52-hp Parsons Porbeagle diesel engines, costing £38,500.) Sold 1991. On display from May 1991 at Moelfre Seawatch Centre, December 2025.
997	37-26	Lady Murphy	1971	1972–1988	Kilmore Quay	(Note: Legacy of Lady Frances Murphy, built by William Osborne of Littlehampton, with twin 52-hp Parsons Porbeagle diesel engines, costing £38,360.) Sold 1990. Broken up at Arklow, August 1995

=== 48-foot 6-inch boats ===
All built by William Osborne, Littlehampton except ON 989, Berthon Boat Co., Lymington

ON	Op. No.	Name	Built	In service	Stations	Comments
968	48-01	The Earl and Countess Howe	1963	1963–1977	Yarmouth	(Note: From RNLI funds, built by William Osborne of Littlehampton, with twin 110-hp Gardner 6LX diesel engines, costing £40,348.) Sold 1984. Displayed at RNLI Depot, Poole 1984–2003. Broken up at Portishead, September 2003.
968	48-01	The Earl and Countess Howe	1963	1977–1984	Walton and Frinton	Sold 1984. Displayed at RNLI Depot, Poole 1984–2003. Broken up at Portishead, September 2003.
989	48-02	James and Catherine Macfarlane	1967	1967–1983	Padstow	(Note: Gift of Mr Macfarlane, built by Berthon Boat Company of Lymington, with twin 110-hp Gardner 6LX diesel engines, costing £53,000.) Sold 1988. On display at Land's End 1988–2016. Now restored, at St Mary's, Isles of Scilly, August 2024.
989	48-02	James and Catherine Macfarlane	1967	1983–1987	Lizard-Cadgwith	Sold 1988. On display at Land's End 1988–2016. Now restored, at St Mary's, Isles of Scilly, August 2024.
990	48-03	Ruby and Arthur Reed	1966	1967–1984	Cromer	(Note: Gift of Mrs Reed, built by William Osborne of Littlehampton, with twin 110-hp Gardner 6LX diesel engines, costing £60,000.) Sold 1988. On display from 1990 at Hythe Marina, Southampton, December 2025.
990	48-03	Ruby and Arthur Reed	1966	1985–1988	St Davids	Sold 1988. On display from 1990 at Hythe Marina, Southampton, December 2025.
1015	48-12	Charles Henry	1968	1969–1984	Selsey	(Note: Legacy of Mr Henry, built by William Osborne of Littlehampton, with twin 110-hp Gardner 6LX diesel engines, costing £72,000.) Sold 1987. On display at Merry Hill Shopping Centre, Dudley 1989–1999. Restored, at Royal Quays Marina, North Shields, March 2025.
1015	48-12	Charles Henry	1968	1984–1987	Baltimore	Sold 1987. On display at Merry Hill Shopping Centre, Dudley 1989–1999. Restored, at Royal Quays Marina, North Shields, March 2025.
1016	48-13	Princess Marina	1970	1970–1988	Wick	(Note: Gift of H. M. Thomson Trust, and legacy of Mrs D. H. Napier, built by William Osborne of Littlehampton, with twin 110-hp Gardner 6LX diesel engines, costing £72,000.) Sold 1989. Displayed at Motor Boat Museum, Pitsea. Broken up in 2003, engines supplied to ON 805.

== See also ==
- Royal National Lifeboat Institution lifeboats
