= RNLB Manchester Unity of Oddfellows (ON 960) =

English lifeboat

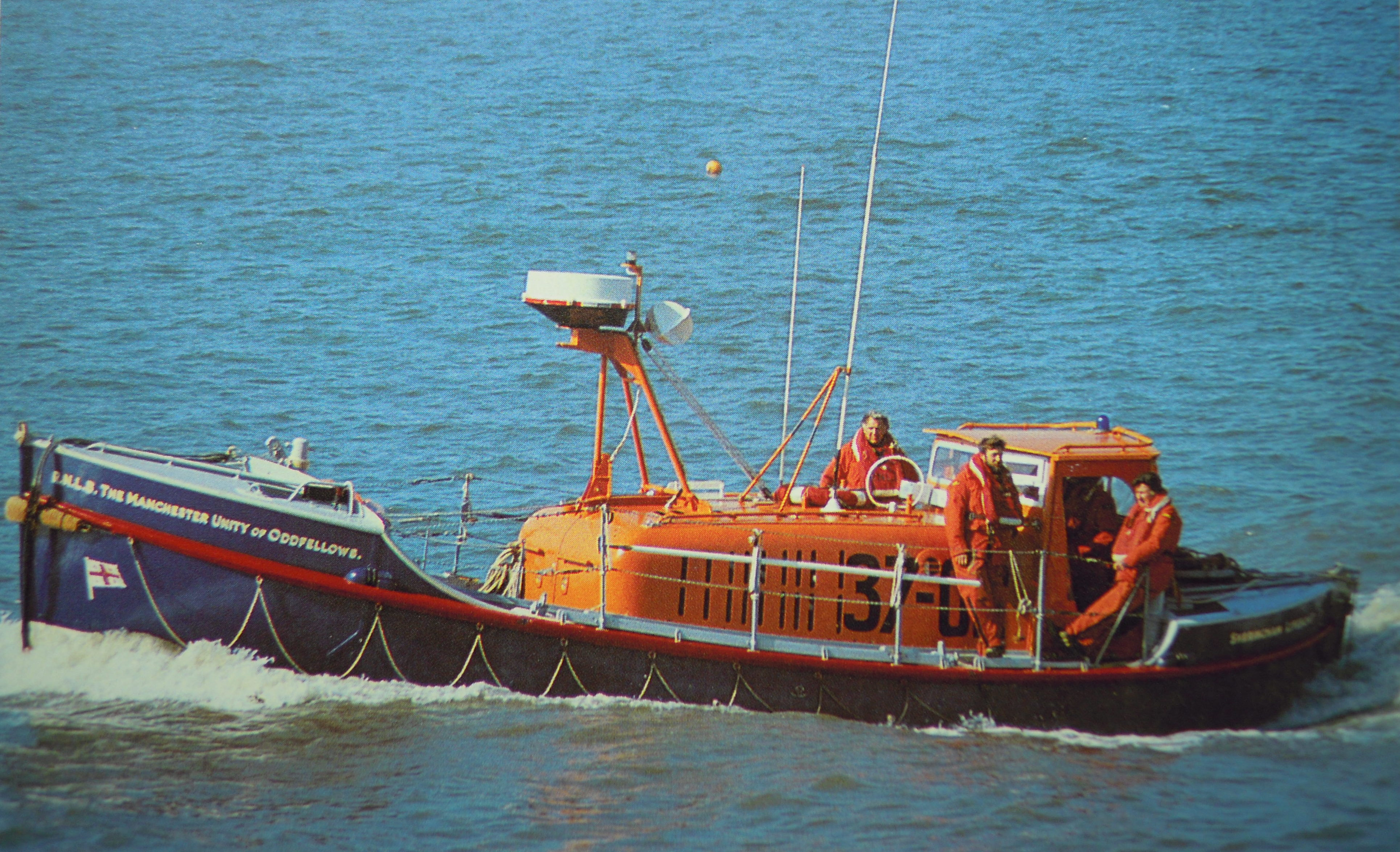
- The Manchester Unity of Oddfellows ON 960

History

United Kingdom
- Owner: Royal National Lifeboat Institution (RNLI)
- Builder: William Osborne, Arun Shipyard, Littlehampton, West Sussex
- Official Number: ON 960
- Donor: A gift of The Unity Friendly Society (The Oddfellows)
- Station: Sheringham
- Cost: £28,500
- Yard number: No:WO960
- Launched: 14 March 1961
- Christened: 15 June 1962 by HRH Princess Marina, Duchess of Kent
- Acquired: 1961
- Decommissioned: 1990
- In service: 29 years
- Fate: Displayed in Sheringham Museum, The Mo, from Thursday 25 March 2010

General characteristics
- Class & type: Oakley
- Type: Self-righting
- Tonnage: 11 long tons 17 cwt (26,500 lb or 12 t)
- Displacement: 12 long tons 1 cwt (27,000 lb or 12.2 t)
- Length: 37 ft 0 in (11.28 m) overall
- Beam: 11 ft 6 in (3.51 m)
- Installed power: twin Perkins P4M, 43 bhp (32 kW)Diesel engine.; Re-engined in 1982 with twin 52 bhp (39 kW) Thornycroft 250 2701E four cylinder Diesel engines
- Propulsion: 2× 23 inches (580 mm) by 15 inches (380 mm) pitch propellers in tunnels
- Speed: 8 kn (15 km/h)
- Range: 190 nmi (350 km)
- Notes: Once put on Display at the Royal Show in Cambridge in 1961. The lifeboat was re-hulled between 1985 and 1986 at Crescent Marine, Otterham Quay, Upchurch.

The Manchester Unity of Oddfellows (RNLI Official Number 960) was an Oakley-class lifeboat of the Royal National Lifeboat Institution (RNLI) stationed at Sheringham in the English county of Norfolk from 10 July 1961 until 1990 when she was replaced after 29 years service by an Atlantic 75 second generation Rigid Inflatable Boat (RIB) in May 1992. During the time that The Manchester Unity of Oddfellows was on station at Sheringham, she performed 127 service launches, rescuing 134 lives.

== Design and construction ==
The Manchester Unity of Oddfellows was built at the yard of William Osborne at Littlehampton, West Sussex. She was an Oakley class self-righting design which combined great stability with the ability to self-right in the event of the lifeboat capsizing. This was achieved by a system of shifting water ballast. The system worked by the lifeboat taking on one and half tons of sea water at launching in to a tank built into the base of the hull. If the lifeboat then reached a crucial point of capsize the ballast water would transfer through valves to a righting tank built into the port side. If the capsize was to the starboard side of the lifeboat, the water shift started when an angle of 165° was reached. This would push the boat into completing a full 360° roll. If the capsize was to the port side, the water transfer started at 110°. In this case the weight of water combined with the weight of machinery aboard the lifeboat usually managed to stop the roll and allow the lifeboat to bounce back to upright.

=== Hull construction ===
The hull of The Manchester Unity of Oddfellows was constructed from African mahogany built with two skins. Each skin was diagonally laid with a layer of calico laid between the skins. The outer skin was 3/8 in (9.5 mm) thick with the inner skin being 1/4 in (6.4 mm) thick. The keel was iron and weighed 1.154 tons. The hull was divided into eleven watertight compartments. The lifeboat was 37 feet 0 inches (11.28 m) in length and 11 feet 6 inches (3.51 m) in beam and displaced 12 long tons 1 cwt (27,000 lb or 12.2 t), when fully laden with crew and gear. She was fitted with twin Perkins P4M, 43 brake horsepower (32 kW) Diesel engine, which moved her over the water at 8 knots (15 km/h). The wheelhouse was positioned amidships.

=== Equipment ===
The lifeboat was fitted with Decca 060 radar and all she carried Pye Westminster VHF and an Ajax MF radio telephones. In addition a radio Direction Finding set was carried, which gave a magnetic bearing to a transmitting station. The electric searchlight was standard along with Pains Wessex speedlines.

== Service and rescues ==
The Manchester Unity of Oddfellows performed a total of 127 service launches during here 29 years at Sheringham becoming the longest serving Oakley class lifeboat in the RNLI's fleet.

=== Coxswains ===
Over the period that The Manchester Unity of Oddfellows was stationed at Sheringham she had a total of five coxswains who were as follows:

- Henry Downtide West, 1961 to 1962
- Henry Joyful West, 1963 to 1984
- Jack West, 1985 to 1986
- Brian Pegg, 1986 to 1989
- Clive Rayment, 1989 to 1990

=== Rescue of the Lucy ===
One notable rescue was carried out on 15 August 1961. the Lucy was herself a converted ship's lifeboat and she was on her maiden voyage from Peterborough to Southwold. There was a north west wind blowing, bitterly cold and sea conditions were described as short steep sea. The Lucy sprung a leak at the stern and started to take on water rapidly. Her four crew became concerned and started to send up distress signals. The signals were spotted and The Manchester Unity of Oddfellows made what was going to be a difficult launched. Because of the conditions of the tide, haul-off rope had to be used to prevent the lifeboat from being washed broadsides onto the beach. Just as the boat left the carriage the mast holding the haul-off rope snapped and it was only by skilful handling by coxwain Henry 'Downtide' West that tragedy was averted. The lifeboat found the Lucy 5 miles (8.0 km) north east of Sheringham. Three lifeboatmen were put aboard the Lucy to help transfer the boat owner's unconscious wife and young son to The Manchester Unity of Oddfellows. The owner was transferred next, while the fourth member of the crew remained on board with the lifeboatmen while a tow was attempted. In the fierce swell the tow rope snapped and the coxwain decided to evacuate the four men remaining on board. The casualties were landed at Sheringham and all made a full recovery.

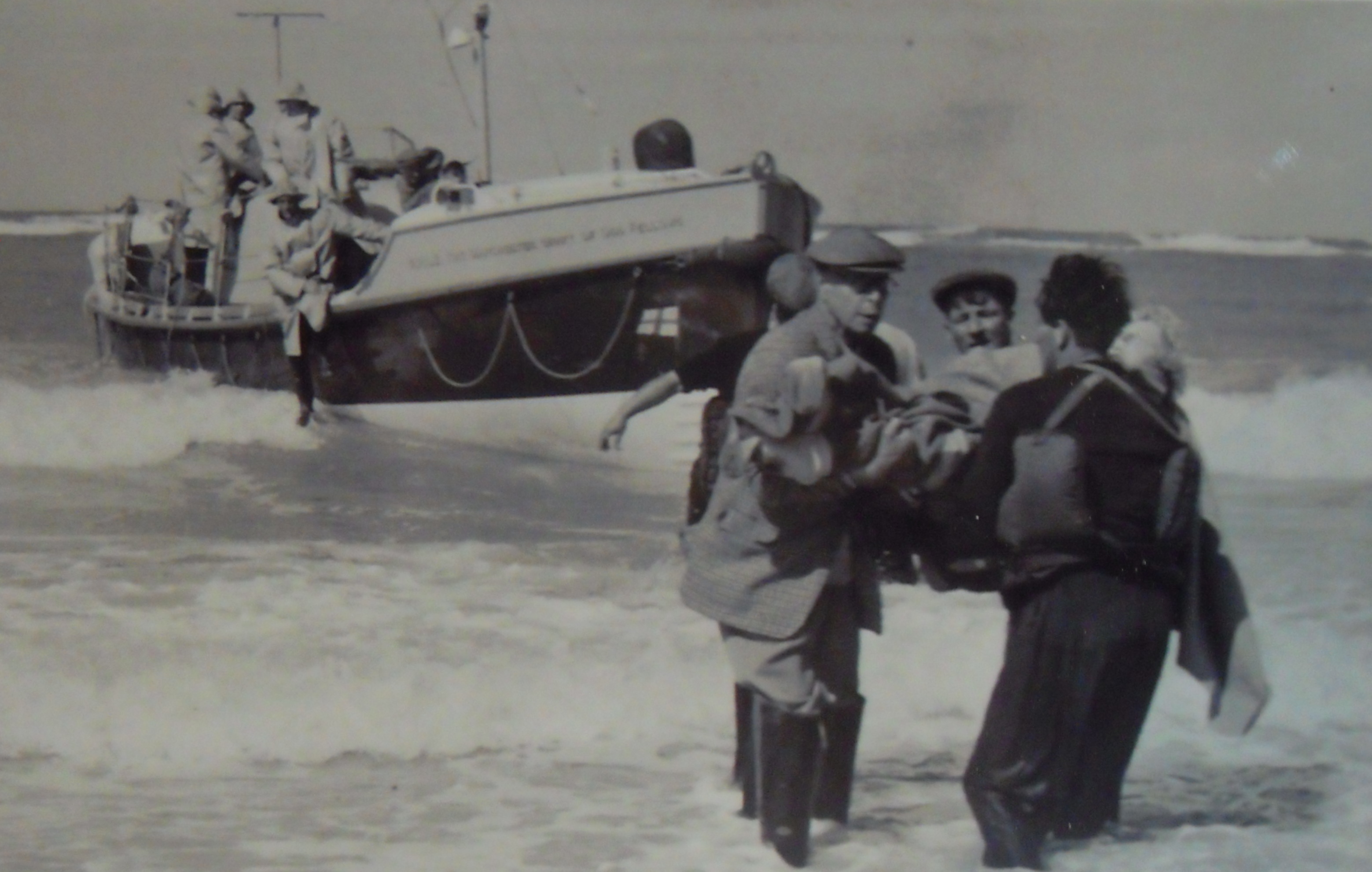
The Lifeboat lands an injured crewman from the Lucy

=== Retirement ===
When The Manchester Unity of Oddfellows was retired from service her place was temporally taken by the last of Sheringham's all-weather lifeboats, the Lloyds II, built in 1966 and paid for by donations from members of Lloyd's of London. On 18 April 1992, Lloyds II left Sheringham having performed seven services while on station. In May 1992 an Atlantic 75 second generation Rigid Inflatable Boat (RIB) also named Manchester Unity of Oddfellows became the permanent replacement for The Manchester Unity of Oddfellows ON 960

== The lifeboat displayed at Sheringham Museum ==
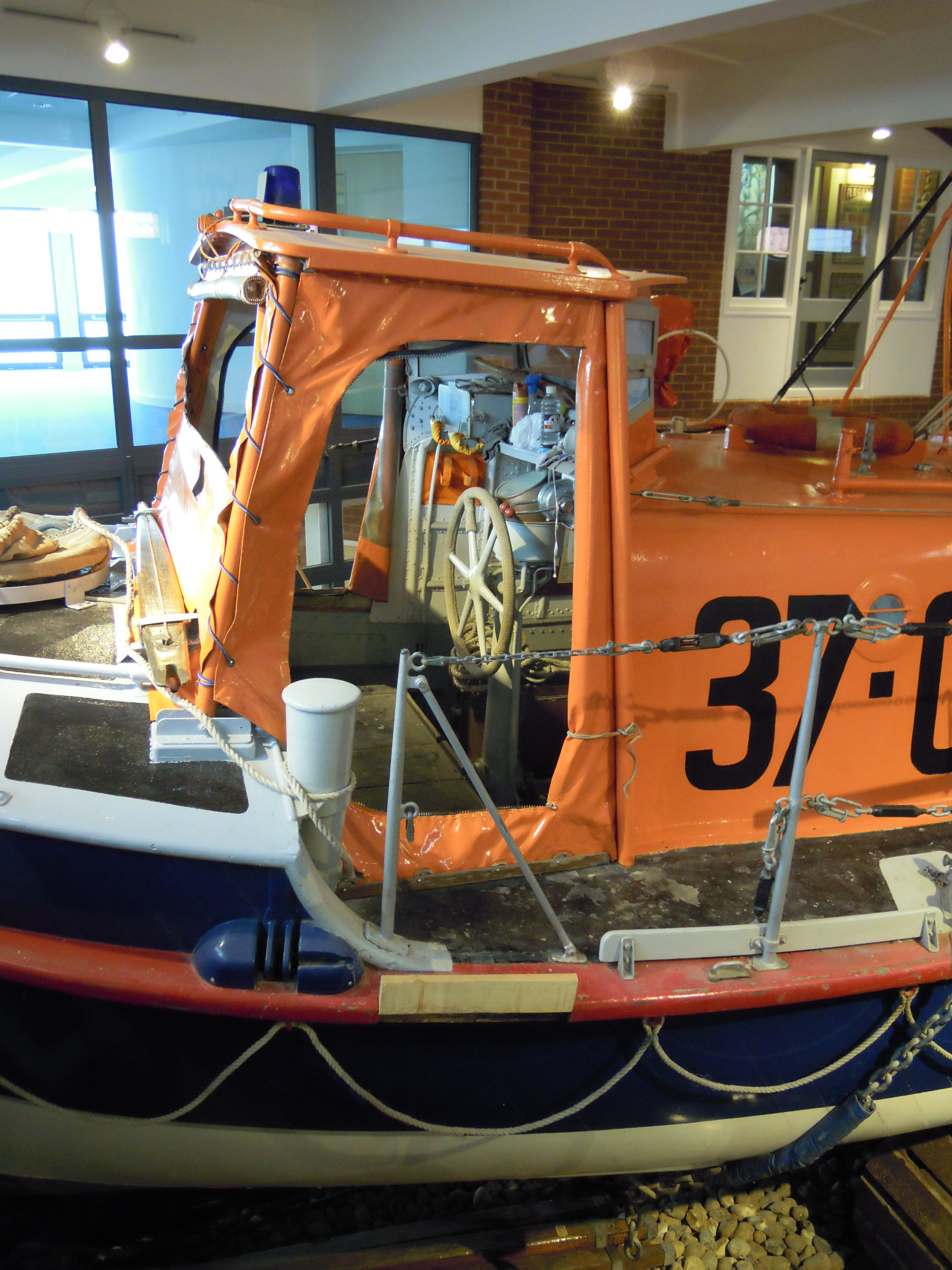
The Bridge

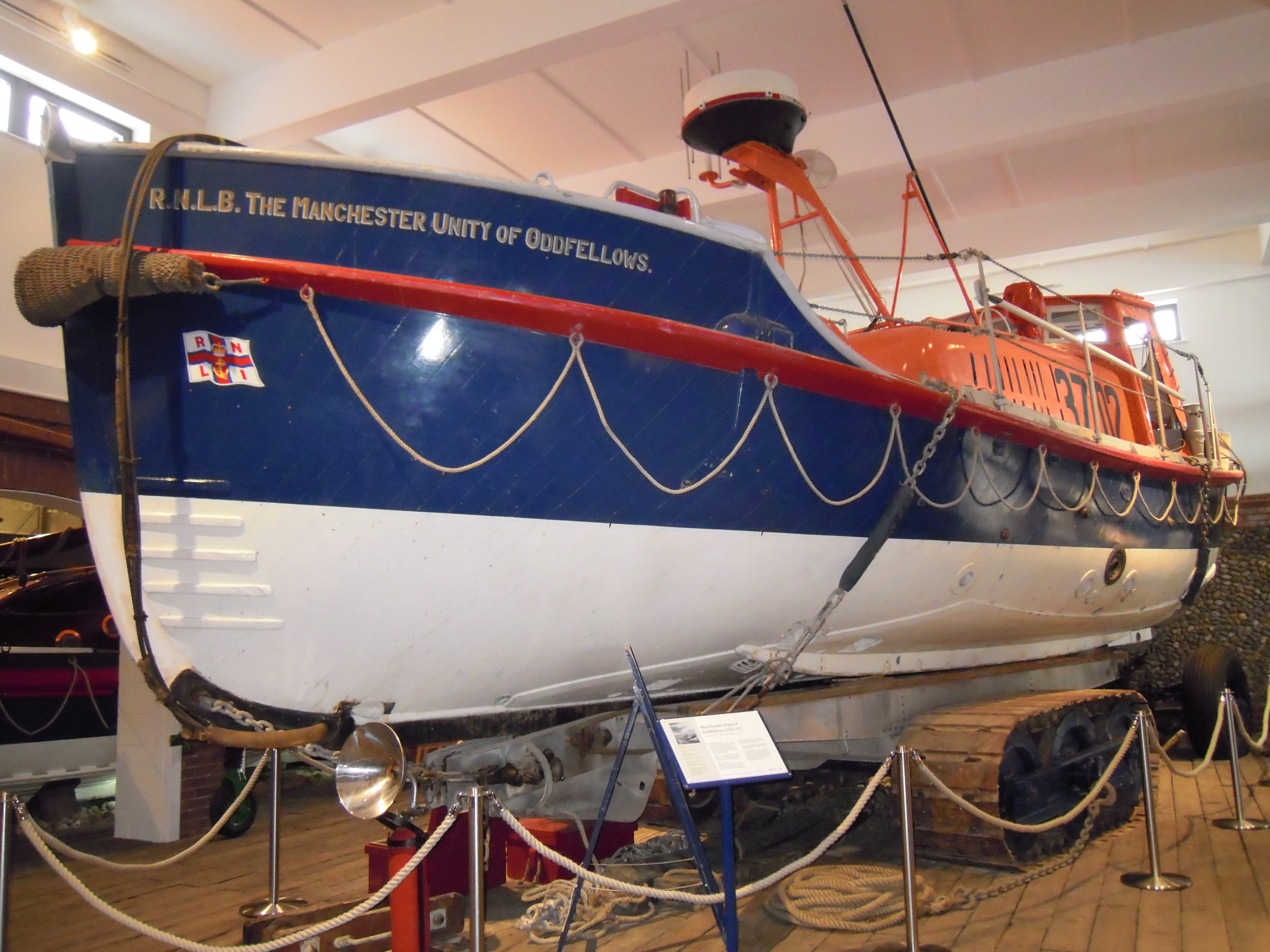
Port side

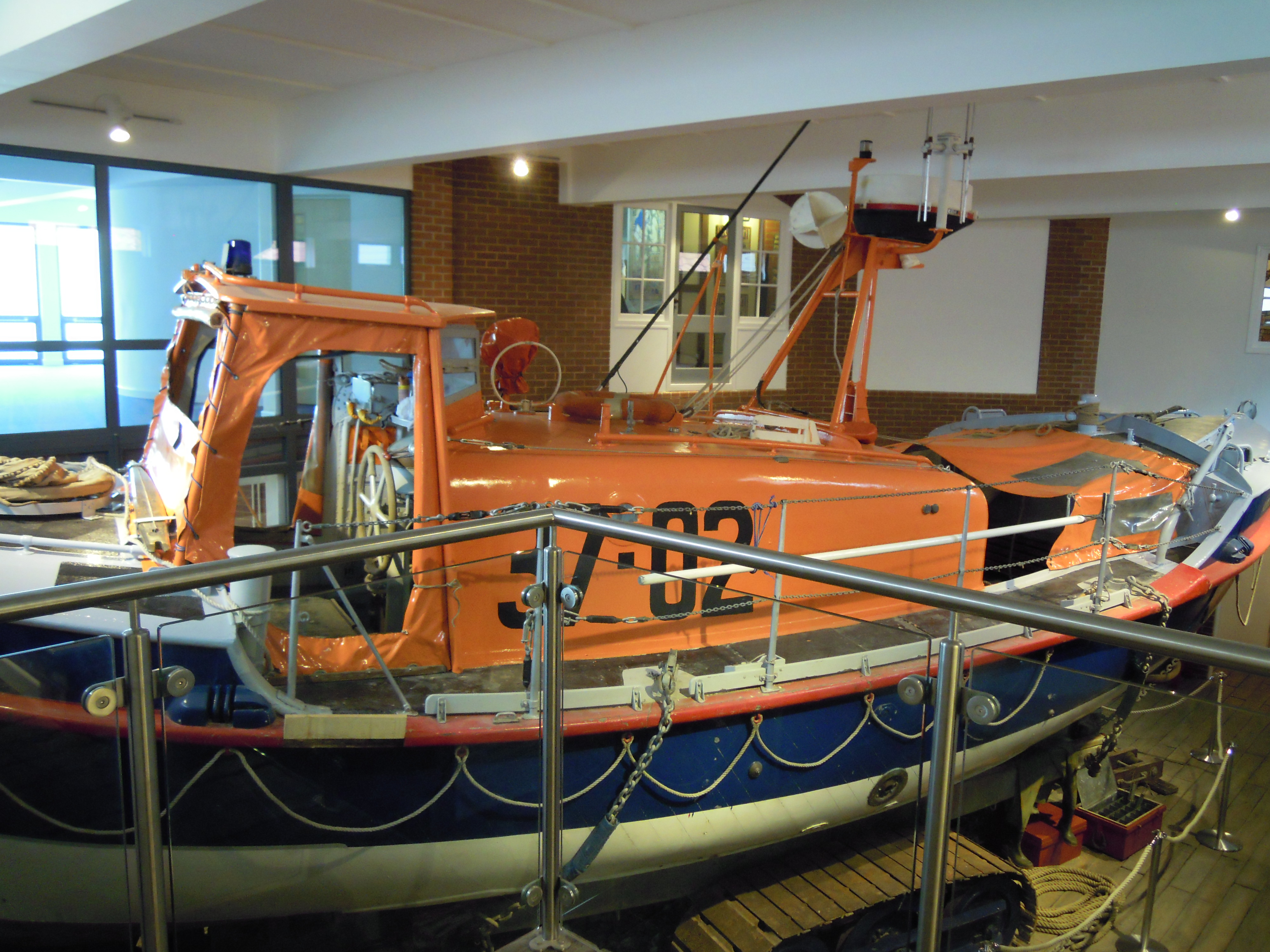
Starboard side

== Service and rescues ==
RNLB Manchester Unity of Oddfellows ON 960
Date	Casualty	Lives saved
1961
13 July	Four crab boats, escorted boats	
8 August	Small Yacht, saved boat	3
15 August	Converted Ships Lifeboat Lucy, saved boat	4
1962
9 July	Converted Ships Lifeboat Sea Hawk, saved boat	4
7 August	Fishing vessel Sprat, saved boat	2
1963
15 August	Cabin cruiser Buccaneer, In tow of crab boat, saved boat, landed 3	
1964
1 September	Crab boat White Rose, of Sheringham, gave help	
1965
20 June	Speed boat Sea Sprite, saved boat	2
15 August	Yacht Tablet, saved yacht	
15 August	Speed boat Red Barrel, landed 2	
5 September	Cabin Cruiser Sirius, gave help	
1966
1 July	Motor vessel Pantarali of Panama, landed 2 and a body	
1967
18 April	Four crab boats of Sheringham, gave help	
1968
29 January	Motor cruiser Hilary Anne, saved boat	1
20 May	Nine fishing boats of Sheringham, escorted	
25 May	Fishing boat Tania of Sheringham, saved boat	2
30 June	Cabin cruiser She's a Lady, assisted to save cruiser	3
17 August	Sailing Dinghy, saved dinghy	2
1969
9 February	Motor vessel Richmond Castle, of London, landed a sick man	
17 September	Crab boat Cicely, of Sheringham, escorted	
1971
3 January	Fishing boat Our Boys, of Sheringham, escorted	
8 February	Fishing boat Welcome Messenger, of Sheringham, escorted	
29 April	Eight fishing boats of Sheringham, stood by	
3 June	Fishing boats Our Boys and Mizpah of Sheringham, stood by	
9 June	Converted motor fishing boat Peggy, of Sheringham, saved boat	1
19 June	Cabin Cruiser John Kay, saved boat	6
1972
31 July	Cabin cruiser Cylvia, gave help	
16 September	Yacht Sea Boots, saved	2
1973
1 January	Dudgeon Lightvessel, landed a sick man	
6 April	Yacht Sallie of Maldon, saved	3
24 April	Dudgeon Lightvessel, landed a sick man	
8 August	Fishing vessel Ame of King's Lynn, gave help	
7 November	Haisborough Lightvessel, landed a sick man	
1974
27 April	Six motor fishing vessels, escort vessels	
25 November	Fishing vessel Kilsyth, landed an injured man	
1976
1 January	Finnlark of Finland, landed an injured man	
2 June	Yacht Blue Tit, saved boat	2
4 September	Barge Focena, saved boat	2
1977
5 August	Yacht Niord, gave help	
25 October	Dinghy, escorted boat	
1978
28 March	Fishing boat Jonathan James, gave help	
5 July	Converted Admiralty supply vessel VIC.32, escorted vessel	
8 September	Motor launch Ailsa, gave help	
1979
29 January	Fishing boat Mizpah, gave help	
5 April	Fishing boat Mizpah, escorted boat	
16 April	Fishing boat Harvester, Saved	2
26 August	Motor cruiser Dora Lee, saved	5
1980
8 April	Fishing boats, escorted boats	
1983
9 August	Cabin cruiser Cocktail II saved boat	3
1984
11 May	Fishing boats, escorted boats	
24 May	Fishing boats, escorted boats	
10 August	Motor fishing vessel Venturer, saved vessel	2
1985
20 April	Rubber Dinghy Force Four GT, saved boat	2
13 May	Fishing boats, escorted boats	
3 June	Cargo vessel Bandick of Guernsey, landed an injured man	
1 August	Rafts, saved	60
3 August	Catamaran Norwegian Blue, stood by	
15 September	Two skin divers saved	2
1986
28 October	Fishing boat Crystal Dawn, saved boat	2
1987
25 April	Fishing boat Fragrance gave help	
28 May	Motor fishing vessel Kathleen, Mizpah and Pegasus, gave help	
28 May	Fishing vessel Good Courage, escorted vessel	
25 July	Fishing boats, escorted boats	
29 July	Fishing vessel Sea Eagle, Landed 3 sick men	
4 October	Fishing vessel Caroline, saved	2
1988
15 May	Motor yacht Kitaja, craft brought in–gave help	
26 June	Fishing vessel Justifier, craft brought in-gave help	
19 August	Sailboard, saved board	1
2 September	Fishing vessel Liberty, craft brought in-gave help	
1989
15 February	RoRo cargo vessel Torga Thia, of Sweden, stood by	
16 April	Fiahing boat Cheryl C, svaed boat	2
30 May	Fishing vessel Pegasus, of Great Yarmouth, escorted vessel	
21 June	Fishing vessels Donna Maria and Justified, gave help	
29 June	Yacht Meg, saved boat	3
29 June	Sailing club safety boat Jeanie, escorted boat	
29 June	Fishing vessel Sea Eagle, escorted vessel	
1990
14 April	Sailboard, saved board	1
15 July	Fishing vessel Blue Boy, gave help	
19 August	Skin diver, saved	1
19 August	Two motor boats, gave help	
28 September	Last Service, Yacht Smiling Swiss, landed an injured woman	

Preceded by RNLB Forester's Centenary (ON 786)	RNLB The Manchester Unity of Oddfellows (ON 960); 1961 to 1990	Succeeded by RNLB Lloyds II (ON 986)
