= Parsons Engineering =

Parsons Engineering Co. Ltd of Town Quay works, Southampton was originally incorporated in 1904 as Parsons Motor Co. Ltd by Mr Harry Parsons (1873-1951). It was advertised both as repairers of Motor Cars, but also as sellers of Motor Boats and engine and propeller sets. Not to be confused with C. A. Parsons and Company who made marine steam turbines.

Harry Parsons was at one time the chief designer for Rudge-Whitworth 1895-1897, then works manager for the Beeston Cycle Company (formed 1897 from the New Beeston Cycle Company), then Premier Cycle Company, and then in London he was designer and works manager for the Motor Traction Company before moving to Southampton and starting his own business with a special interest in marine engines capable of running on paraffin.

Parsons changed its names to Parsons Oil Engine Co by Jan 1927 (although they continued to list a few petrol fuelled engines). The Parsons works suffered serious damage due to bombing during WW2, but in 1946 it was made a public company with Harry Parsons as chairman and managing director. The influx of investors' money enabled a new works to be created and equipped by 1948. In 1950 Harry Parsons handed over to Colonel I.A. Marriott as managing director. In 1955 Associated British Engineering (who already owned 40% of the shares) bought out the rest, but they continued as Parsons Engineering Co Ltd. Associated British Engineering also acquired British Polar Engines, and in 1964 they acquired Mathway Marine. In the 1980s Mathway and Parsons were brought together to form Parsons Mathway Marine.

== Motor Cars ==
In 1906 Parsons Motor Co were agents for Spyker and Darracq cars. By 1914 the marine interest and the motor car interests were separated by the formation of a new company, Parsons & Kemble Ltd, automobile engineers, which shared the Town Quay address. Apart from repairs Parsons & Kemble hired-out cars, and were agents for Renault, Calthorpe, Arrol-Johnston and the Willys Overland (1914). This business continued after WW1 when they were listed as agents for the Arrol-Johnston (1919)., and in the 1920s mainly Renault cars.

== Marine Engines ==
Parsons were clearly involved with marine engines from early in its history. In the 1905 motor boat trials at Southampton it entered a 28 foot boat propelled by its own twin cylinder petrol/paraffin engine rated at 14/16HP. At the 1907 Olympia Boat Show they showed a 7HP motor "with patent valve gear for petrol, heavy oil or alcohol".

Harry Parsons generated many patents during his working life, the earliest in 1893, and the last in 1941. As would be expected from his employment history these mainly covered mechanical inventions for pedal cycles and for internal combustion engines. He had some unorthodox ideas about the benefits of concentric inlet and exhaust valves, which may have been a feature of his earliest engines. These inventions enabled the use of alternative fuels to petrol, which presented considerable dangers on a boat due to its volatility. This issue was overcome with the arrival of marine diesel engines (oil engines). He also patented his designs for the marine gearbox, which became a significant product of his company.

Parsons continued engine manufacture during WW1, and the 1917 Red Book listing available products shows them to have a line-up of 11 different marine engines all suited to petrol or paraffin.

HP	Cylinders	Bore (in)	Stroke (in)	RPM	Weight (lbs)
7	1	4.5	6	800	430
14	2	4.5	6	800	700
21	3	4.5	6	800	850
28	4	4.5	6	800	1050
42	6	4.5	6	800	1450
30	2	6.5	8	550	2100
45	3	6.5	8	550	2600
60	4	6.5	8	550	3300
90	6	6.5	8	550	4200
120	4	9	12	400	9000
180	6	9	12	400	12850

In January 1925 Parsons Motor Co reported that its new lifeboats were ready to be supplied to liners following the new board of trade rules that required every liner having 15 lifeboats to have one powered lifeboat with wireless and searchlight, and every liner with 20 or more lifeboats to carry two powered lifeboats. The Parsons-powered lifeboats had exceeded the minimum speed requirement by 1 knot.

Parsons changed its name to Parsons Oil Engines by January 1927, and while indicating the move from petrol to oil engines, this might also mark the move from engine manufacturer to engine conversion for marine use. Parsons does not appear as a marine engine manufacturer in the trade directories of the mid-1930s onwards. On the other hand Parsons marine reverse and reducing gearboxes receive several mentions, being standard fitment on McClaren marine engines, and optional on many others from the 1930s onwards.

In the 1950s Parson's were able to list a wide range of diesel marine engines, claiming in 1956 50 years of experience with marine engines. Most of the engines advertised were stated to be marinised versions of diesel engines from other manufacturers, particularly from Ford, but also from Armstrong-Whitworth, Meadows, and Petter. They continued to list marine gearboxes and also listed steering gear.

== Locomotive Engines ==
In the early days of internal combustion rail locomotives, boat engines that were already in production were an obvious choice for adaptation as they were designed to run for long times without undue wear and to be relatively compact. Medium sized boat engines were in a size range between truck engines and large stationary engines. In 1915 Avonsides delivered 12 narrow gauge petrol engined locomotives to the War Office, these had 4-cylinder 60 hp Parsons engines. Parsons engines were used in a number of early locomotives and railcars (such as the 1930s Drewry railcars made by Baguley).

== Industrial Engines ==
Parsons supplied engines for a wide variety of stationary and other non-marine uses. Examples are air compressors (mobile and stationary), electric welding units, and electrical generator sets. In 1922 they published a document showing examples of the range of applications of the Parsons (petrol and paraffin) engines.
