= Kilmore Quay Lifeboat Station =

RNLI Lifeboat station in County Wexford, Ireland

- Flag of the RNLI

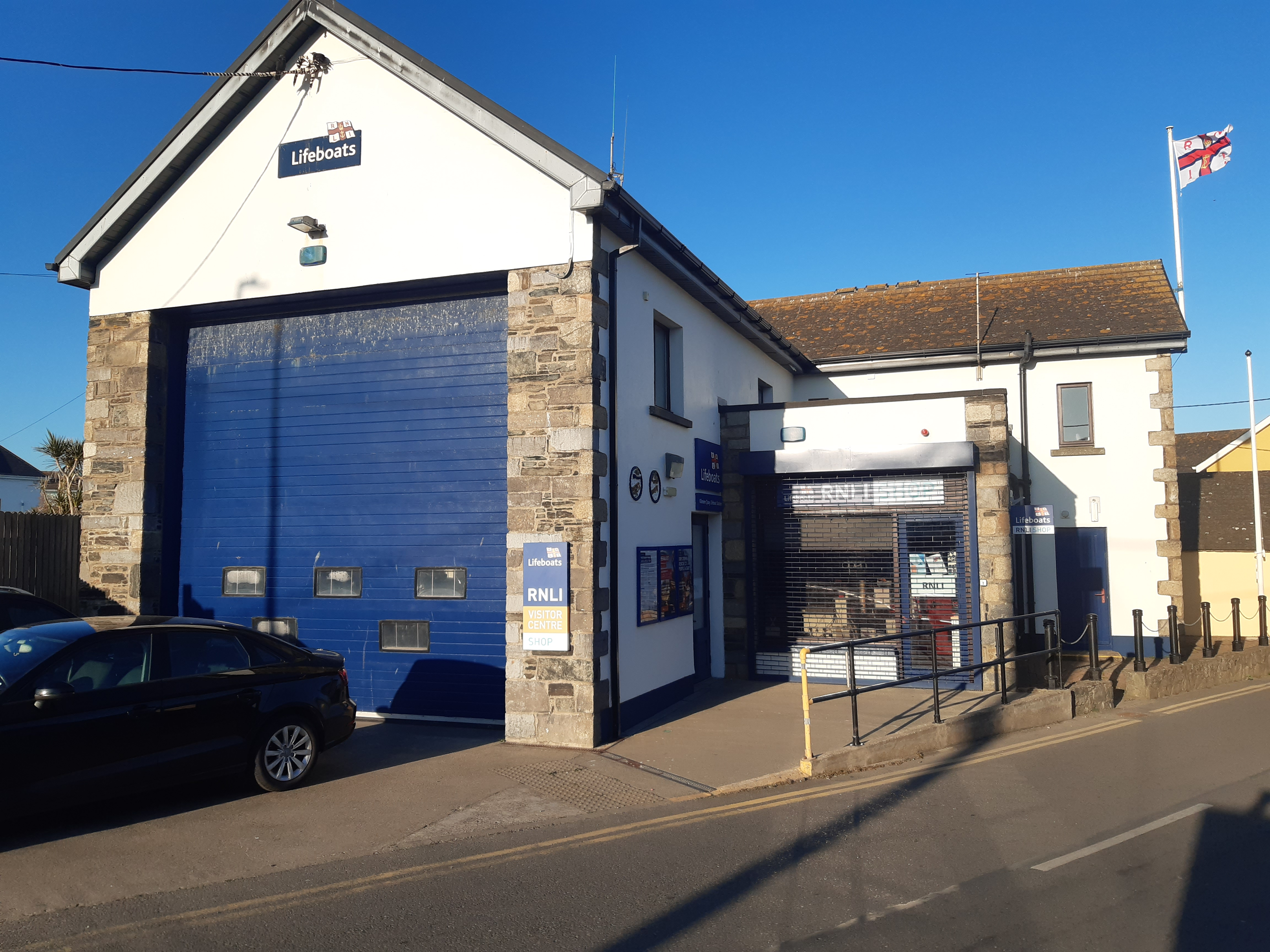
- Kilmore Quay Lifeboat Station

- Location within Ireland
- Former names: Kilmore Lifeboat Station

General information
- Type: Lifeboat station
- Location: Crossfarnogue, Kilmore Quay, Ireland
- Coordinates: 52.1733°N 6.5897°W
- Opened: First lifeboat 1847; First boathouse 1884; Current building 1992
- Owner: Royal National Lifeboat Institution

Website
- Kilmore Quay RNLI Lifeboat Station

Kilmore Quay Lifeboat Station can be found on Crossfarnogue, close to the harbour in Kilmore Quay, a fishing village approximately 46 km (29 mi) to the east of Waterford, overlooking the Saltee Islands, on a promentory on the south coast of County Wexford, in south-east Ireland.

A lifeboat provided by the Royal National Institution for the Preservation of Life from Shipwreck (RNLIPLS), later to become the Royal National Lifeboat Institution (RNLI), was placed at Kilmore Coastguard Station in 1847. The station remained in operation for 11 years. The RNLI re-established Kilmore Lifeboat Station in 1884.

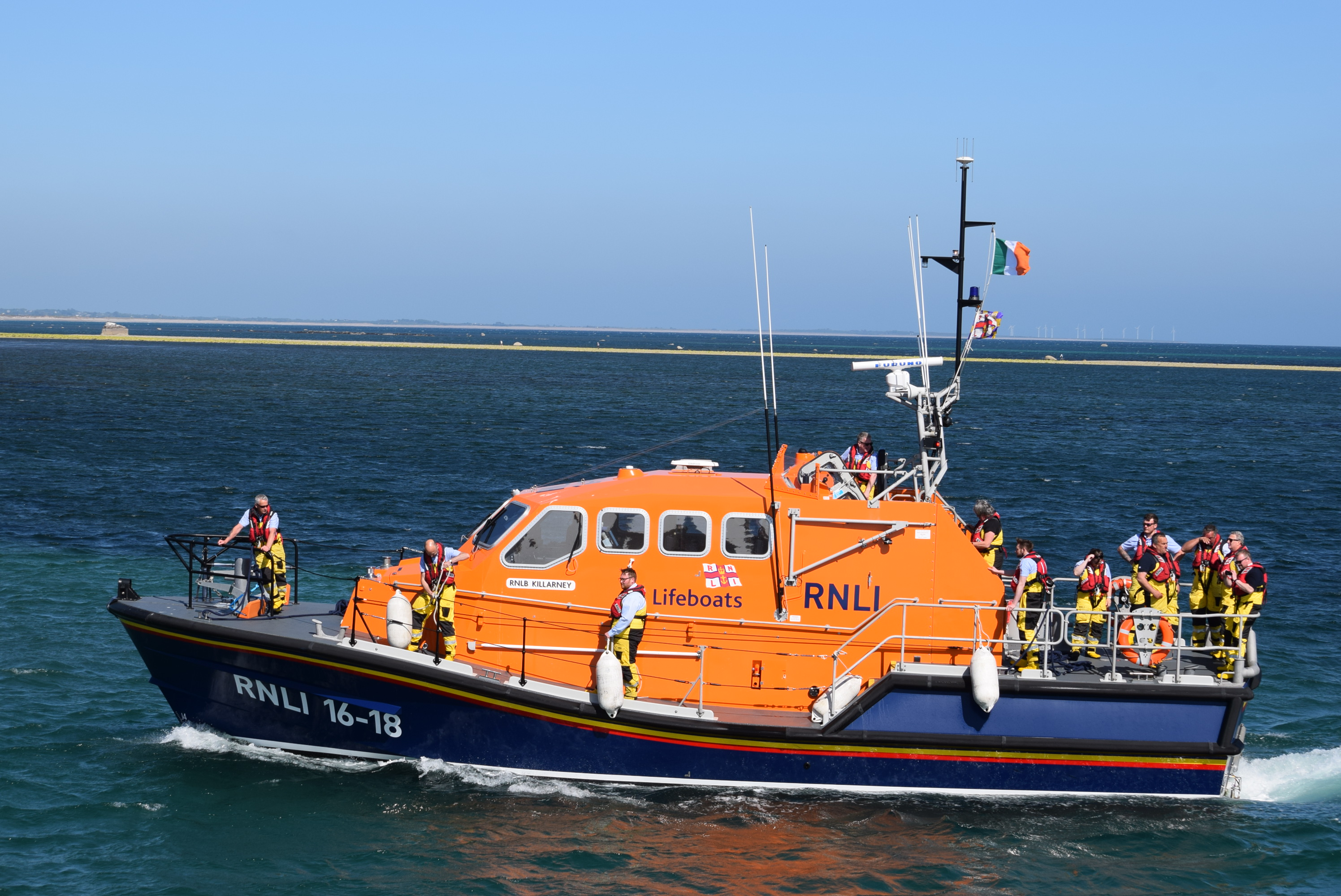
Tamar-class All-weather lifeboat, 16-18 Killarney (ON 1298)

Kilmore Quay Lifeboat Station currently operates a Tamar-class All-weather lifeboat, 16-18 Killarney (ON 1298), on station since 2010.

== History ==
In the 1840s, Kilmore was little more than a few cottages, and a coastguard station. A small harbour had been constructed. The RNIPLS had been asked to provide a boat to the local coastguard, which arrived on station on 28 July 1847. The boat was a 28-foot-long (8.5 m) non-self-righting lifeboat, designed by George Palmer, and built by Taylor of Blackwall, London, costing £73.

On 18 September 1852, both the Rosslare Fort and Kilmore lifeboats launched to the aid of the emigrant ship Bhurtpoor, with 419 people aboard, which ran ashore on Long Bank, whilst bound for New Orleans from Liverpool. Between a group of vessels, including fishing smacks, a pilot cutter, the oysterboat Teetotaller, 416 people were saved, with the Kilmore lifeboat accounting for 30.

For the rescue of the crew of six from the brigantine Exile on 22 October 1853, five Kilmore coastguards, John Ahern, Donald Gray, Daniel Regan, Henry Smith, and William Cox, were awarded the RNLI Silver Medal. A sixth coastguard, Dennis Donovan, was awarded a Second-Service clasp. A seventh coastguard, J. Barrett, died soon after the rescue, and didn't receive a medal. His widow was granted £2.

For his part in rescuing five people from the brigantine Isabella, which was wrecked during a heavy gale on the rocks of Kilmore on 18 December 1855, Chief Boatman Dennis Donovan received the silver medal. As the medals for the 1853 rescue were only awarded after the 1855 rescue, Donovan would receive the Second-Service clasp, for a rescue he had done first.

At a meeting of the RNLI committee of management on Thursday 6 September 1855, a letter was read from Capt. Shoveller, RN, Chief officer of the Kilmore Coastguard Station, stating that the boat was needing repair, and that he had been unsuccessful in organising a lifeboat committee at the station. Instructions were given to effect necessary repairs, until a new lifeboat could be placed on station, but it appears that the boat was condemned in 1855, although retained until 1857, when it was broken up.

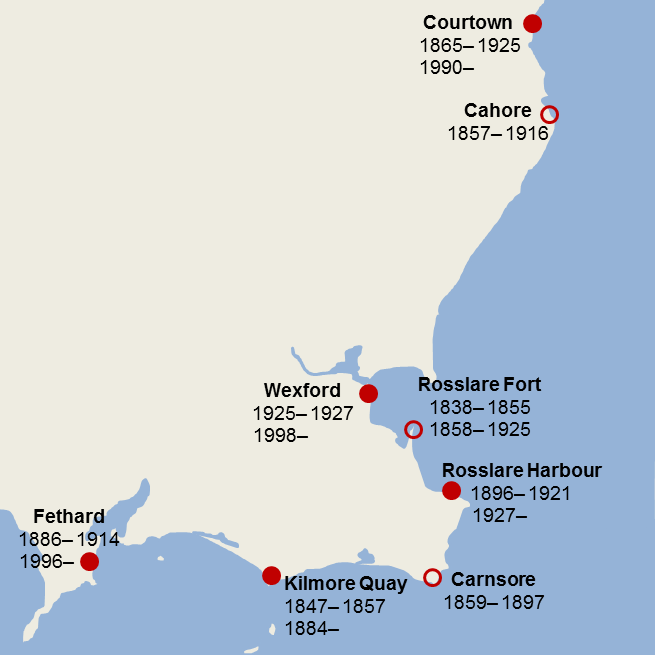
Map showing the lifeboat stations in County Wexford

As confirmed in the Annual Report of 1858, a new 28 ft (8.5 m) 'Pulling and Sailing (P&S) lifeboat, one with both sails and six oars, was constructed by Forrest of Limehouse, and sent to the Kilmore station in 1857.

It was later reported that new boats for a number of stations, including Rosslare and Kilmore, had been destroyed in a fire, at the Forrestt boatyard on 19 June 1858. A further reference in the Annual Report of 1859, noted that a new lifeboat was 'ready to be sent' to Kilmore, but no new boat ever arrived, and Kilmore also disappeared from the list of active stations in the 1859 'Statement of lifeboats and stations'. No records have been found to indicate what became of the 1857 lifeboat.

There is no further record of a lifeboat at Kilmore until 1884, when the RNLI decided, on the recommendations of Lt. Tipping, RN, District Inspector of Life-boats, and of the Divisional Officer of H.M. Coastguard, that it would be desirable to formally establish Kilmore Lifeboat Station, "there being many outlying dangers both inside and outside the Saltee Islands quite inacessible to the rocket apparatus". A boathouse was constructed close to the harbour on Crossfarnogue, at a cost of £320, and a 34 ft (10 m) lifeboat, John Robert (ON 99), built by Woolfe of Shadwell, and costing £363, was placed on station.

On 19 December 1957, the French trawler Augusta Maurice with 10 crew needed the services of the Kilmore lifeboat, during a gale that was gusting up to Force 10. Coxswain Mark Bates led the rescue and was awarded the RNLI Silver Medal and a gift from the Peninsular and Oriental Steam Navigation Company's 'James Michael Bower Endowment Fund'.

In 1986, the station was renamed Kilmore Quay Lifeboat Station.

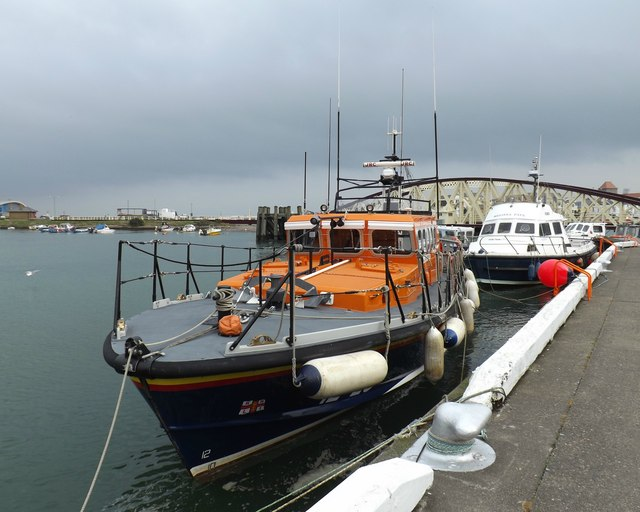
Mersey-class lifeboat 12-28 Mary Margaret (ON 1187)

The old 1884 boathouse was demolished in 1992, with a new larger boathouse constructed on the same site, completed in December. This was done to accommodate the station's new Mersey-class lifeboat 12-28 Mary Margaret (ON 1187), as well as housing the Talus MB-H Crawler launch tractor (T107), and included a workshop, crew room and facilities, and a souvenir outlet.

Coxswain John Devereux was awarded "A Framed Letter of Thanks signed by the Chairman of the Institution", for his skill, judgement and seamanship, while undertaking a six-hour tow of the historic tug Golden Cross, which broke down on 21 December 1999.

Following the arrival of the Tyne-class lifeboat 47-021 The Famous Grouse (ON 1133) on 7 April 2004, which would remain afloat, a new berth was provided in the harbour, completed in September 2004, at a cost of £17,145.

At a ceremony at Kilmore Quay harbour on 15 June 2011, Irish President Mary McAleese officially named the new Tamar-class All-weather lifeboat 16-18 Killarney (ON 1298). The lifeboat had arrived at Kilmore Quay on 27 October 2010, and was the first Tamar class lifeboat to be placed in Ireland. The lifeboat, costing €3m, was funded from the bequest of Mrs Mary Weeks from Cheam in Surrey. Mrs Weeks had family connections to the coxswain of Salcombe lifeboat Samuel Distin, and crew member Albert Distin, both lost on service in 1916. She also met her late husband whilst on a cruise, on a boat named Killarney.

== Area of operation ==
The RNLI aims to reach any vessel in distress up to 50 nmi (93 km) from the coast within 2 hours of launching. The Tamar-class lifeboat at Kilmore Quay has a range of 250 nautical miles (460 km; 290 mi) and top speed of 25 knots (46 km/h; 29 mph).

Adjacent stations with All-weather lifeboats are Dunmore East to the west, Rosslare Harbour to the north, and St Davids in Wales to the east. There is also an Inshore lifeboat at Fethard between Kilmore Quay and Dunmore East.

== Notable service ==
=== False alarm ===
At 01:15 on Christmas Eve, 24 December 1977, with the wind howling, and huge waves breaking on the harbour wall, the Kilmore Oakley-class lifeboat 37-26 Lady Murphy (ON 997) launched within 10 minutes, to the report of flares seen. Tragically, it turned out to be a false alarm. Nearing Forlorn Point, a huge wave capsized the lifeboat. When the lifeboat righted, the windscreen was shattered, and the mast was broken. Finton Sinnott had a badly cut head. Second Coxswain Joseph Maddock was missing. Acting Mechanic John Devereux managed to get the engines running, and after a few minutes, Maddock was spotted in the water, and hauled back aboard..

Turning for home, the lifeboat was capsized for a second time. This time, four men were washed overboard, including the unfortunate Joseph Maddock for a second time. The three men still aboard, Coxswain Thomas Walsh, Acting Mechanic John Devereux, and a young Eugene Kehoe, on his first shout, managed to recover Maddock, and the two Culleton brothers, David and Dermot, but 20-year-old Finton Sinnott was lost. He was the first Irish lifeboat crewman lost since 1914. For their service that night, Coxswain Thomas Walsh was awarded the RNLI Silver Medal, and John Devereux, the acting mechanic, received a bronze medal. "The Thanks of the Institution inscribed on Vellum" was accorded to each of the Kilmore crew, with a "Special Vellum of the Institution" awarded posthumously to Finton Sinnott.

=== Lily B ===
During Storm Barbara on 20 October 2020, the 100-metre (330 ft) general cargo vessel Lily B, carrying 4000 tonnes of coal from Germany, and with nine crew aboard, lost all power, 2 miles (3.2 km) off Hook Head. With the vessel now drifting towards the shore, the Trent-class lifeboat from Dunmore East, the Severn-class lifeboat from Rosslare Harbour, and the Tamar-class lifeboat from Kilmore Quay, were all tasked for the rescue operation, along with the Irish Coast Guard Helicopter Rescue 117.

In gale-force eight conditions, gusting to gale-force nine, with waves of 8–10 metres (26–33 ft) in height, some of the worst conditions encountered by many of the lifeboat crew, lines were eventually secured to the vessel, and the operation began to tow the vessel away from the shore. After three hours, the much more powerful tugboat Tramontane arrived on scene and took over the tow. The Tramontane, at 32 m (105 ft) long, was twice the size of any of the lifeboats. With the three lifeboats now standing by, the Lily B was brought to the sheltered waters of the Waterford estuary. By this time, the lifeboats had been on service for over 12 hours.

For the first time in nearly 200 years of the RNLI, "for their fine display of seamanship and boat-handling skills in atrocious weather conditions, in securing a tow and determination to succeed resulting in the saving of nine lives", the coxswains of all three lifeboats; Roy Abrahamsson (Dunmore East), Eamon O'Rourke (Rosslare Harbour), and Eugene Kehoe (Kilmore Quay), were each awarded the RNLI Bronze Medal, for the same service. Medal Service Certificates were presented to each lifeboat crew member.

== Station honours ==
The following are awards made at Kilmore (Quay):

- RNLI Silver Medal
  John Ahern, Boatman, H.M. Coastguard, Kilmore – 1853 (awarded 1856)
  William Cox, Boatman, H.M. Coastguard, Kilmore – 1853 (awarded 1856)
  Dennis Donovan, Boatman, H.M. Coastguard, Kilmore – 1853 (awarded 1856) (Second-service clasp)
  Donald Gray, Boatman, H.M. Coastguard, Kilmore – 1853 (awarded 1856)
  Daniel Regan, Boatman, H.M. Coastguard, Kilmore – 1853 (awarded 1856)
  Henry Smyth, Boatman, H.M. Coastguard, Kilmore – 1853 (awarded 1856)
  Dennis Donovan, Chief boatman, H.M. Coastguard, Kilmore – 1855
  Mark Bates, Coxswain – 1958
  Thomas Francis Walsh, Coxswain – 1977
- James Michael Bower Endowment Fund, awarded by the Peninsular and Oriental Steam Navigation Company
  Mark Bates, Coxswain – 1958
- RNLI Bronze Medal
  John James Devereux, Acting Motor Mechanic – 1977
  Eugene Kehoe, Coxswain – 2022
- The Thanks of the Institution inscribed on Vellum
  Kilmore Quay lifeboat crew – 1977
- Special Vellum of the Institution
  Finton Sinnott, crew member (post.)
- Medal Service Certificate
  Kilmore Quay lifeboat crew – 2022
- 'A Framed Letter of Thanks signed by the Chairman of the Institution'
  John James Devereux, Coxswain – 2000
  Eugene Kehoe, Coxswain – 2007

== Roll of honour ==
In memory of those lost whilst serving at Kilmore:

- Died soon after the rescue of six crew from the brigantine Exile, 22 October 1853.
  J. Barrett, Boatman, H.M. Coastguard
- Lost when the lifeboat 37-26 Lady Murphy (ON 997) capsized for the second time, on 24 December 1977.
  Finton Sinnott (20)

== Kilmore lifeboats ==
=== Pulling and Sailing (P&S) lifeboats ===
On station	ON (Note: ON is the RNLI's Official Number of the boat.)	Name	Built	Class	Comments
1847–1855	—	Unnamed	1847	Palmer	(Note: 28 ft 0 in (8.53 m) x 6 ft 0 in (1.83 m) (5/6-oared) Palmer-class non-self-righting lifeboat, funded by the RNIPLS, built by Taylor of Blackwall, London, costing £73.); Condemned in 1855, Broken up in 1857.
1856–1858	—	Unnamed	1856	28-foot Peake self-righting (P&S)	(Note: 28 ft 0 in (8.53 m) x 6 ft 0 in (1.83 m) (6-oared) Peake-class self-righting (P&S) lifeboat, funded by the RNIPLS, built by Forrestt of Limehouse, London, costing £160.)
Station closed 1858–1884
1884–1901	99	John Robert	1884	34-foot self-righting (P&S)	(Note: 34 ft 0 in (10.36 m) x 8 ft 3 in (2.51 m) (10-oared) self-righting (P&S) lifeboat, gift of Miss E. M. Steadman of London, built by Woolfe of Shadwell, London, costing £363.); Sold in 1902.
1902–1928	496	The Sisters	1902	35-foot self-righting (P&S)	(Note: 35 ft 0 in (10.67 m) x 8 ft 6 in (2.59 m) (10-oared) self-righting (P&S) lifeboat, legacy of Miss M. Taylor of Leeds, built by Thames Ironworks of Blackwall, London, costing £811.); Sold in 1928.
1928–1931	492	Brittan Willis	1902	35-foot self-righting (P&S)	(Note: 35 ft 0 in (10.67 m) x 8 ft 6 in (2.59 m) (10-oared) self-righting (P&S) lifeboat, legacy of Mrs E. A. Willis of Weston-super-Mare, built by Thames Ironworks of Blackwall, London, costing £810.); Previously at Greencastle. Sold in 1931.
1931–1937	638	John Dunn	1914	35-foot self-righting (P&S)	(Note: 35 ft 0 in (10.67 m) x 8 ft 6 in (2.59 m) (10-oared) self-righting (P&S) lifeboat, legacy of Miss Jane Dunn of Belfast, built by Thames Ironworks of Blackwall, London, completed by S. E. Saunders of Cowes, costing £1327.); Previously at Drogheda No.2 and Clogherhead. Sold in 1937.

=== Motor lifeboats ===
On station	ON	Op.No. (Note: Op.No. is the RNLI's Operational Number of the boat or vehicle carried on the hull.)	Name	Built	Class	Comments
1937–1965	798	—	Ann Isabella Pyemont	1937	Liverpool	Sold in 1966. Renamed Ann Isabella LO61 and modified as a fishing boat. At Blakeney, Norfolk, December 2025.
1965–1972	850	—	Cecil Paine	1945	Liverpool	Previously at Wells-next-the-Sea. Sold in 1973 for further use as a lifeboat in Portugal.
1972–1988	997	37-26	Lady Murphy	1972	Oakley	The last Oakley-class lifeboat built. Sold in 1990. Broken up at Arklow, August 1995.
1988–1991	994	37-23	Vincent Nesfield	1969	Oakley	Initially deployed in the Reserve Fleet. Broken up at Arklow, December 1991.
1991–1992	976	37-09	The Lilly Wainwright	1964	Oakley	Previously at Llandudno. Sold in 1993. Fully restored, at Crosshaven Boatyard, Cobh, June 2025.
1992–2004	1187	12-28	Mary Margaret	1992	Mersey	Sold in 2023. Operating as workboat Pisces, Yarmouth, Isle of Wight, December 2025
2004–2010	1133	47-021	The Famous Grouse	1987	Tyne	Initially deployed in the Relief Fleet. Sold in 2013 for further use as a lifeboat in British Columbia, December 2025.
2010–	1298	16-18	Killarney	2010	Tamar	

More post-service details can be found on the respective lifeboat class pages.

=== Launch and recovery tractors ===
On station	Op.No.	Reg.No.	Type	Comments
1949–1954	T16	YW 3377	Clayton	
1954–1965	T32	FYE 221	Case L	
1965–1971	T51	KLA 85	Case LA	
1971–1976	T59	OJJ 866	Fowler Challenger III	
1976–1989	T58	HZR 780	Fowler Challenger III	
1989–2001	T107	F415 EAW	Talus MB-H Crawler	
2001–2003	T108	F133 FUJ	Talus MB-H Crawler	

== See also ==
- List of RNLI stations
- List of former RNLI stations
- Royal National Lifeboat Institution lifeboats

== Sources ==
- Leonard, Richie; Denton, Tony (2026). Lifeboat Enthusiasts Handbook 2026. Lifeboats Enthusiasts' Society.
- Farr, Grahame; Morris, Jeff (1992). List of British Lifeboats Part 1 & 2 (Second ed.). Lifeboat Enthusiasts' Society.
