= Rosslare Harbour Lifeboat Station =

RNLI Lifeboat station in County Wexford, Ireland

- Flag of the RNLI

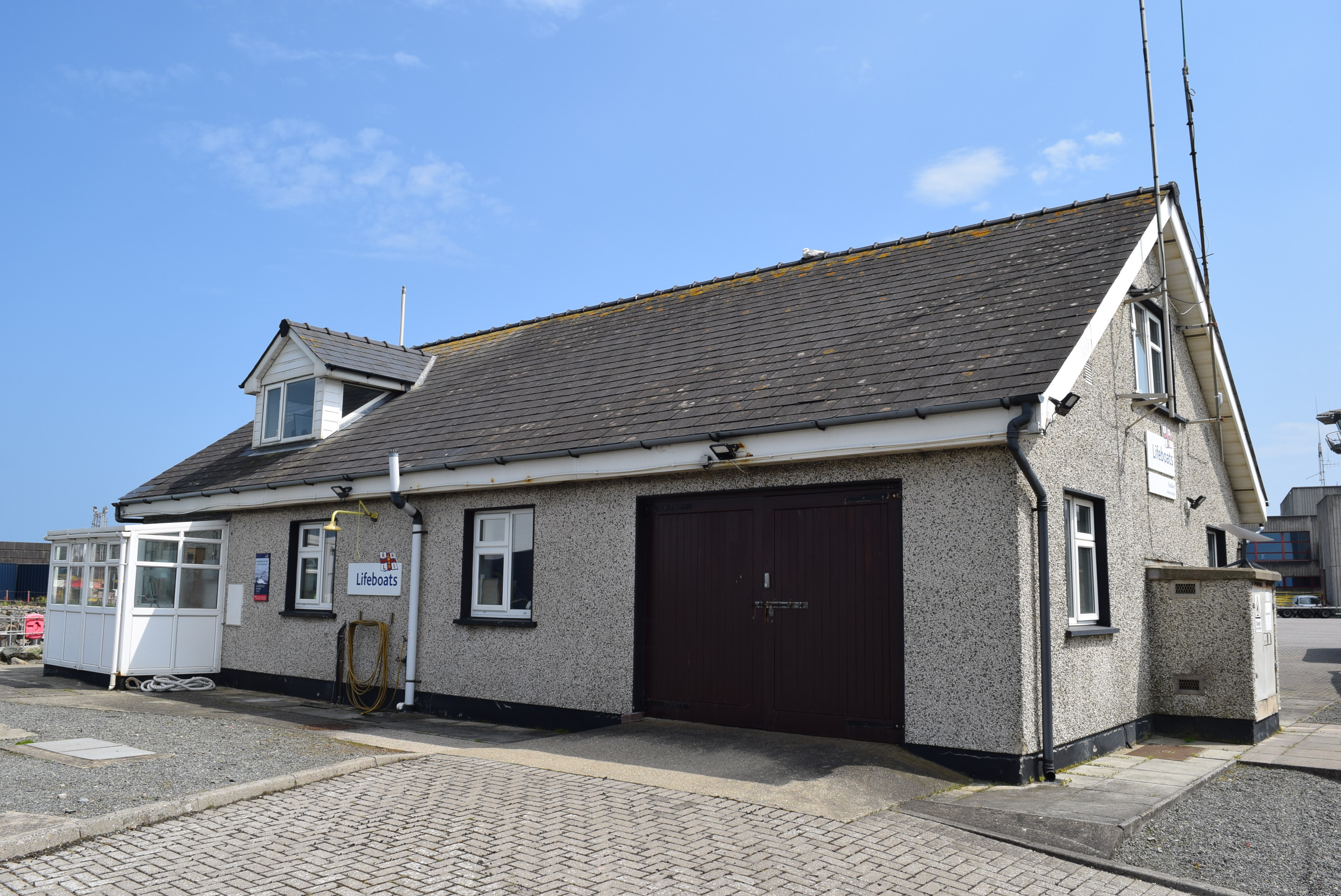
- Rosslare Harbour Lifeboat Station in 2025

- Location within Ireland

General information
- Type: Lifeboat station
- Location: Rosslare Harbour, Ireland
- Coordinates: 52.254°N 6.3358°W
- Opened: 1896–1921; 1927–
- Owner: Royal National Lifeboat Institution

Website
- Rosslare Harbour RNLI Lifeboat Station

Rosslare Harbour Lifeboat Station can be found inside Rosslare Europort at Rosslare Harbour, a port town approximately 150 km (93 mi) south of Dublin, in the south eastern corner of Ireland. Located on the secure 'waterside' of the port, there is no public access.

A lifeboat station was established at Rosslare Harbour by the Royal National Lifeboat Institution (RNLI) in 1896, but closed in 1921, when a motor-powered lifeboat was placed at Wexford. However, just six years later in 1927, the station was reopened, after the Wexford lifeboat station at Rosslare Point had to be abandoned, following devastating coastal erosion.

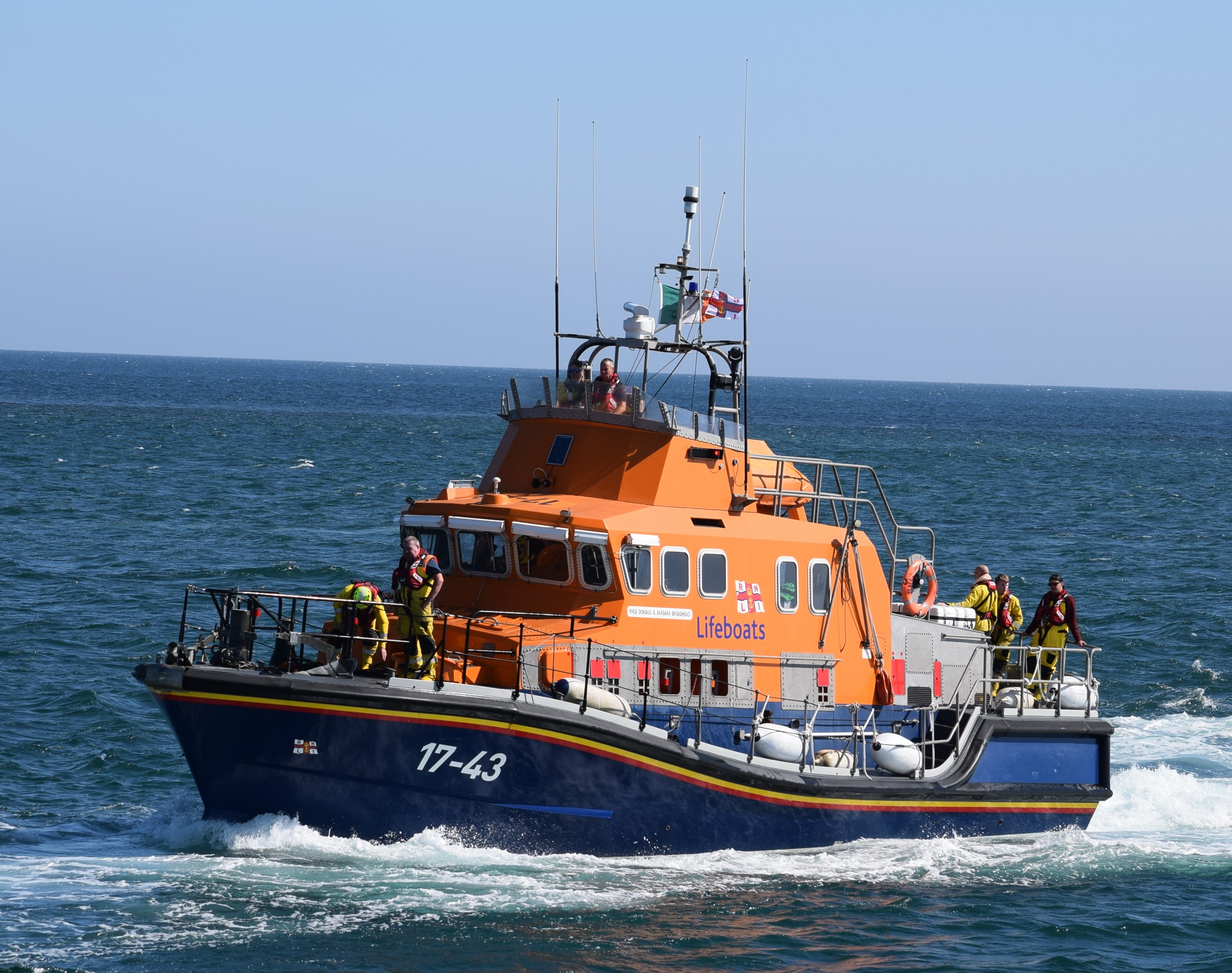
Severn-class All-weather lifeboat 17-43 Donald and Barbara Broadhead (ON 1276)

The station currently operates a Severn-class All-weather lifeboat, 17-43 Donald and Barbara Broadhead (ON 1276), on station since 2004.

== History ==
In the late 1800s, the village of Ballygeary, within the townland of Ballygillane Big, was little more than a hamlet, with a handful of dwellings, some constructed for the lighthouse keepers of Tusker Rock, and a coastguard station. It was however, the intended location for a new port, Rosslare Harbour, suggested by Victorian Engineer Isambard Kingdom Brunel, to replace the ever more difficult port of Wexford, which was suffering from silt and shifting sand banks.

Two lifeboats were already stationed just 4 nmi (7.4 km; 4.6 mi) to the north, sitting at the tip of Rosslare Point, a spit of land on the east of Wexford Harbour, attached to the mainland at its southern end. The station was initially known as Rosslare Fort Lifeboat Station, but later became Wexford Lifeboat Station.

The report of the visit to the developing port of Rosslare Harbour by the deputy Chief Inspector of Lifeboats was read to the RNLI committee of management on Thursday 12 March 1896. Following the closure of Beaumaris Lifeboat Station on 16 April 1896, one of the largest of the self-righting class of lifeboats, the 42-foot-long (13 m) 'Pulling and Sailing' (P&S) lifeboat Tom and Jenny (ON 271), was transferred to a new station at Rosslare Harbour. The lifeboat was kept afloat, and it was expected that a steam tug would be available to tow it out to vessels in distress.

The arrival of the lifeboat at Rosslare Harbour in 1896 brought about a change at Rosslare Point. The smaller of the two lifeboats stationed there, Civil Service No. 1 (ON 301), was transferred to Fethard, and the No. 2 station was closed.

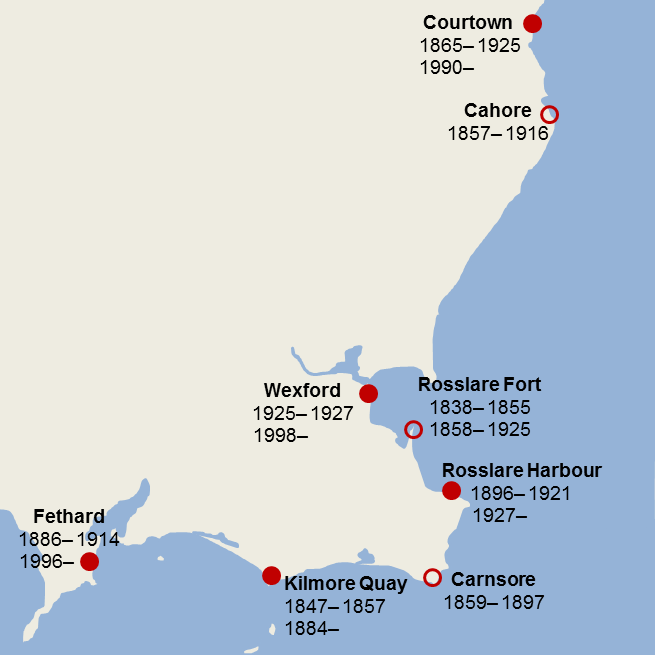
Lifeboat stations around Wexford

Unusually, due to the remote location of the Wexford Lifeboat Station at Rosslare Point, the Institution employed a paid crew, who lived with their families in cottages near the Coastguard's fort. It may be for this reason that when the 45-foot Watson-class motor-powered lifeboat William Evans (ON 653) was available in 1921, it was assigned to Wexford lifeboat station at Rosslare Point, rather than the newer station at Rosslare Harbour. With a far greater speed and range than a traditional P&S lifeboat, the lifeboat at Rosslare harbour was withdrawn, and the 25-year-old station at Rosslare Harbour was closed. The lifeboat house at Rosslare Harbour was sold to the Great Southern and Western Railway for £50.

Just three years later, everything changed. Severe storms on 27 and 31 December 1924, followed by another lasting three days in January 1925, caused devastating coastal erosion and destruction of buildings and infrastructure at Rosslare Point. The families were evacuated by lifeboat to Wexford for safety on 14 January, and the Rosslare Point station was permanently abandoned.

It was decided to reopen the station at Rosslare Harbour, but until it was ready, the Wexford lifeboat remained on service, operating from Wexford Quay. Wexford Lifeboat Station formally closed in 1927, with the lifeboat being transferred to Galway Bay. Many of the Wexford crew transferred to Rosslare Harbour when it reopened, including James Wickham, who had been appointed coxswain in 1925. He had been awarded the RNLI Silver Medal for his part in the rescue of the survivors of the Mexico and the Fethard lifeboat in February 1914.

When the new lifeboat was placed at Rosslare Harbour in 1927, it would now be a motor-powered lifeboat, and also marked a change in lifeboat development. The 45-foot 6in Watson-class boat was the first lifeboat of the Institution to employ two engines, using twin 40-hp Weyburn CE4 petrol engines. It was also the first lifeboat with "wireless" radio communication, and carried a qualified radio operator when on service.

Costing £11,116, the boat was over 40% more expensive than the previous Wexford lifeboat in 1921, and nearly 14 times the cost of the previous P&S lifeboat at Rosslare Harbour. As a result, the lifeboat was funded from not one, but four legacies, received by the Institution. At a ceremony on 3 June 1930, the lifeboat was named K. E. C. F. (ON 700), the name being an amalgamation of the four names requested by the four benefactors:

- Mrs. E. P. Kirby, of Richmond
- Mr. Ernest Kleeman, of Lewisham
- Charles and Elizabeth, via Mrs. E. Dudley, of Birmingham
- Francis Mary and Edward, via Miss M. A. Potton, of Dover

Having already been on station for three years, the lifeboat had been called several times prior to the official naming ceremony. She had been called seven times in just one month, rescuing 29 people, and saving five fishing boats. The rescue of five crew from the schooner Mountblairy of Plymouth on 20 October 1929, resulted in the award of the RNLI Silver Medal (Second-service clasp) to Coxswain James Wickham, the RNLI Bronze Medal to Honorary Secretary William J. B. Moncas, and 'The Thanks of the Institution inscribed on Vellum' to each member of the crew. All the awards were presented at the naming ceremony by the mayor of Wexford, Mr. Richard Corish, TD.

== 1980s onwards ==
On the afternoon of Friday June 28, 1985, a large crowd attended Rosslare Harbour lifeboat station, despite the pouring rain, for the official opening of the new lifeboat pen, and the naming ceremony of the new Arun-class All-weather lifeboat, which had arrived at the station in 1984.

The pen had been constructed for the RNLI with the aid of a grant from the Irish government, and was formally opened by Jim Mitchell, TD, Minister for Communications. After a service of dedication and blessing by the Right Reverend Noel Willoughby, Bishop of Cashel, Ossory and Ferns, and the Most Reverend Brendan Comiskey, Bishop of Ferns, with the Wexford Male Voice Choir joining the Loch Garman Brass Band to lead the singing of the hymns, Mrs Patricia Mitchell stepped forward, and named the lifeboat 52-26 St Brendan (ON 1092).

Disaster struck at 06:45 on the morning of Sunday 9 September 2001. The Stena Line ferry Koningin Beatrix, arriving from Fishguard, suffered a temporary power loss, and reversed into the lifeboat pen, destroying the steel framework, and caused considerable damage to the lifeboat St Brendan. The deck fittings were swept away, and as the bow of the lifeboat was pushed down by the weight of the ferry, water entered the lifeboat through the forward spaces. Fortunately, no one was on board the lifeboat and nobody aboard the ferry was injured. After inspection, the lifeboat was moved under her own power to Kilmore Quay, and was later transferred to Holyhead for inspection by insurance assessors. St Brendan (ON 1092) was subsequently withdrawn from service.

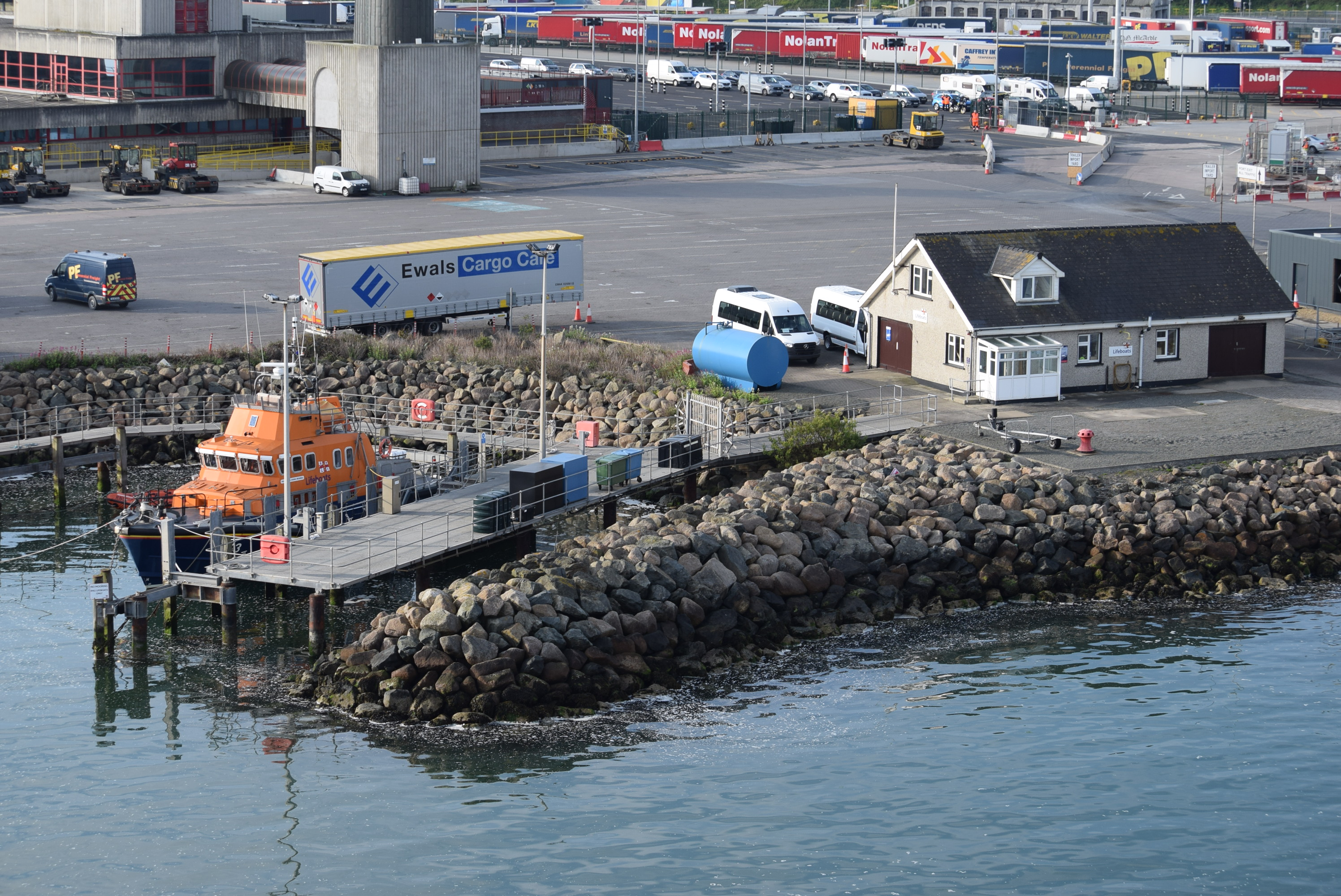
After rebuilding the berth in 2004

The relief lifeboat 52-45 Mabel Williams (ON 1159), on passage to Portrush via Malahide, was redirected to Rosslare, arriving on 14 September. She would remain on service at Rosslare for three years, replaced on 11 February 2004 by another Arun-class lifeboat, 52-41 Ann Lewis Fraser (ON 1143).

A new Severn-class lifeboat Donald & Barbara Broadhead (ON 1276) was placed on service on 9 July 2004. This lifeboat, costing £1.9m, was funded primarily by the legacy of £1.6m from the late Mrs Florence B. A. Broadhead. A new protective berth was completed in the September, at a cost of £1,218,750.

== Area of operation ==
The RNLI aims to reach any vessel in distress up to 50 nmi (93 km) from the coast within 2 hours of launching. The Severn-class lifeboat at Rosslare Harbour has a range of 250 nmi (460 km) and top speed of 25 kn (46 km/h). Adjacent stations with All-weather lifeboats are Kilmore Quay to the south, Arklow to the north, and St Davids to the east. There are also Inshore lifeboats at Wexford and Courtown.

== Service awards ==
Mark Devereux was a master pilot as well as a member of the lifeboat crew. He was awarded an RNIPLS silver medal after riding a horse into the water to rescue people from the schooner Mary after it was wrecked on 13 November 1840. On 18 September 1852 he was one of many people who launched boats to go to the aid of the Bhurtpoor which had run aground while carrying hundreds of emigrants to New Orleans. 419 people were saved and Devereux was awarded silver clasp to go with his medal. He achieved a second silver clasp after launching the No. 2 lifeboat to save a man from the Teazer on 30 January 1865.

Coxswain Richard Walsh was presented with a silver medal, while William Duggan and Richard Hickey were awarded bronze medals, for a difficult service on 27 and 28 November 1954, when the tanker World Concord broke in two. The Rosslare Harbour lifeboat saved the seven people trapped on the fore section, while the lifeboat from St Davids in Wales saved the crew from the aft section.

Second Coxswain Richard McCormack, was awarded the RNLI bronze medal, for leading the rescue on 7 December 1978, of the two crew members of the sinking fishing boat Notre Dame du Sacre Coeur.

Another fishing boat was in trouble in rough seas on 5 November 2003. Coxswain Brendan Pitt saved the boat and its crew of five, for which he received the 'Thanks of the Institution inscribed on Vellum'. He was also presented with a 'Framed Letter of Thanks signed by the Chairman' for his part in towing the tanker Breaksea into harbour, after it was saved from running ashore by the Kilmore Quay lifeboat in a Force 8 storm on 26 March 2006.

=== Lily B ===
On 20 October 2020, during Storm Barbara, the 100-metre (330 ft) general cargo vessel Lily B, carrying 4000 tonnes of coal from Germany, and with nine crew aboard, lost all power, 2 miles (3.2 km) off Hook Head. With the vessel now drifting towards the shore, the Tamar-class lifeboat from Kilmore Quay, the Trent-class lifeboat from Dunmore East, and the Severn-class lifeboat from Rosslare Harbour, were all tasked, along with the Irish Coast Guard Helicopter, Rescue 117.

In gale-force eight conditions, gusting to gale-force nine, with waves of 8–10 metres (26–33 ft) in height, some of the worst conditions encountered by many of the lifeboat crew, lines were eventually secured to the vessel, and the operation began to tow the vessel away from the shore. After three hours, the Tugboat Tramontane arrived on scene, and took over the tow. At 32 metres (105 ft) long, the Tramontane was twice the size of any of the lifeboats. With the three lifeboats now standing by, the Lily B was brought to the sheltered waters of the Waterford estuary. The lifeboats had been on service for over 12 hours.

For the first time in nearly 200 years of the RNLI, "for their fine display of seamanship and boat-handling skills in atrocious weather conditions, in securing a tow and determination to succeed resulting in the saving of nine lives", the coxswains of all three lifeboats, Roy Abrahamsson (Dunmore East), Eugene Kehoe (Kilmore Quay) and Eamon O'Rourke (Rosslare Harbour), were each awarded the RNLI Bronze Medal for the same service. Medal Service Certificates were presented to each crew member.

=== Station honours ===
The following are awards made at Rosslare Harbour:

- RNIPLS Gold Medal
  Martin W. Walsh, Master of the schooner Alicia – 1837
  Lt. Stephen Joshua Lett, RN, Chief Officer of H.M. Coastguard, Rosslare – 1839
- RNIPLS Silver Medal
  Thomas Fletcher, Chief boatman, H.M. Coastguard, Rosslare – 1829
  Mark Devereux, Pilot Master – 1840
  Dr John Waddy, MD – 1842
  Martin Costello, Tide Surveyor – 1852
  Mark Devereux, Pilot Master – 1852 (Second-service clasp)
  Robert Howe, Chief boatman, H.M. Coastguard, Ballygerig – 1852
  Stephen Dodge Pierson, Commissioned boatman, H.M. Coastguard, Ballygerig – 1852
- RNLI Silver Medal
  James Wickham, Coxswain – 1929 (Second-service clasp)
  Richard Walsh, Coxswain – 1955
- RNLI Bronze Medal
  William John B. Moncas, Honorary Secretary – 1929
  William Duggan, Second Coxswain – 1955
  Richard Hickey, Motor Mechanic – 1955
  Richard Seamus McCormack, Second Coxswain – 1979
  Eamonn O’Rourke, Coxswain – 2022
- Medal Service Certificate
  Each of the Rosslare Harbour Lifeboat Crew – 2022
- 'The Thanks of the Institution inscribed on Vellum'
  Rosslare Harbour Lifeboat Crew – 1929
  Rosslare Harbour Lifeboat Crew – 1955
  Brendan Pitt, Coxswain – 2004
  Eamonn O’Rourke, Coxswain – 2017
- Vellum Service Certificate
  Michael Nicholas, crew member – 2017
  Art Shiel, crew member – 2017
  Michael Ferguson, crew member – 2017
  Keith Morris, crew member – 2017
  Padraig Quirke, crew member – 2017
  Stephen Breen, crew member – 2017
  Richard Parish, crew member – 2017
- 'A Framed Letter of Thanks signed by the Chairman of the Institution'
  Michael Sinnott – 2000
  Brendan Pitt, Coxswain – 2007
- Binocular Glass
  William John B. Moncas, Honorary Secretary – 1926
- A case of rum, awarded by the Sugar Manufacturing Association of Jamaica,
  for the longest winter service of 1954.
  Rosslare Harbour Lifeboat Crew – 1955

== Rosslare Harbour lifeboats ==
=== Pulling and Sailing (P&S) lifeboats ===
On station	ON (Note: ON is the RNLI's Official Number of the boat.)	Name	Built	Class	Comments
1896–1911	271	Tom and Jenny	1890	42-foot self-righting (P&S)	(Note: 42 ft 0 in (12.80 m) x 11 ft 0 in (3.35 m) (12-oared) self-righting (P&S) lifeboat, legacy of Mrs Dundas-Drummond of London, built by Forrestt of Limehouse, costing £667 when new. Further funded by an anonymous gift in 1891, and renamed.); Previously Henry Dundas at St Mary's, and Tom and Jenny at Beaumaris. Broken up in 1911.
1911–1921	422	Robert Theophilus Garden	1898	42-foot self-righting (P&S)	(Note: 40 ft 0 in (12.19 m) x 10 ft 6 in (3.20 m) (12-oared) self-righting (P&S) lifeboat, legacy of Mr R. T. Garden of London, built by Thames Ironworks of Blackwall, London, costing £805.); Previously at Wicklow. Sold in 1921.

=== Motor lifeboats ===
On station	ON	Op.No. (Note: Op.No. is the RNLI's Operational Number of the boat carried on the hull.)	Name	Built	Class	Comments
1927–1939	700	—	K.E.C.F.	1927	45-foot 6in Watson	(Note: Funded by the legacies received from the late Mrs. E. P. Kirby, of Richmond, Mr. E. Kleeman, of Lewisham, Mrs. E. Dudley, of Birmingham, and Miss M. A. Potton, of Dover, with the name a combination of the names requested in the respective wills, which were displayed inside the boat.); Transferred to Galway Bay. Sold in 1956 and broken up in 2015.
1939–1952	818	—	Mabel Marion Thompson	1939	46-foot Watson	Transferred to Galway Bay. Sold in 1975. Renamed Carstiona. Under restoration at Kinvarra, Galway, December 2011.
1952–1969	896	—	Douglas Hyde	1951	46-foot 9in Watson	(Note: The Douglas Hyde was named after the first President of Ireland.); Transferred to Dunmore East. Sold in 1973 and broken up in 2018.
1969–1978	1011	48-008	R Hope Roberts	1969	Solent	(Note: R Hope Roberts was funded from the wills of Miss Annie Ronald, Mrs. Rhoda Hope and Miss E. E. Roberts along with a large anonymous donation.); Renamed Sea Guardian, at Gold Coast Marina, Queensland, March 2024.
1979–1984	1007	48-004	George Urie Scott	1969	Solent	First stationed at Lochinver. Sold in 1990. In unaltered condition at Amelands, Netherlands, September 2025.
1984–2001	1092	52-26	St Brendan	1984	Arun	Sold in 2003. Renamed Irish Mist, pleasure boat and houseboat at Ramsey, December 2025.
2001–2004	1159	52-45	Mabel Williams	1990	Arun	First stationed at Ballyglass. Sold in 2007 for further use as lifeboat Hua Ying 391 at Donghai Bureau, China, December 2018.
2004	1143	52-41	Ann Lewis Fraser	1990	Arun	First stationed at Barra Island. Sold in 2007 for further use as lifeboat Hua Ying 392 at Shantou, China, December 2018.
2004–	1276	17-43	Donald and Barbara Broadhead	2004	Severn	

More post-service details can be found on the respective lifeboat class pages.

== See also ==
- List of RNLI stations
- List of former RNLI stations
- Royal National Lifeboat Institution lifeboats
