= Dunmore East Lifeboat Station =

RNLI lifeboat station in County Waterford, Ireland

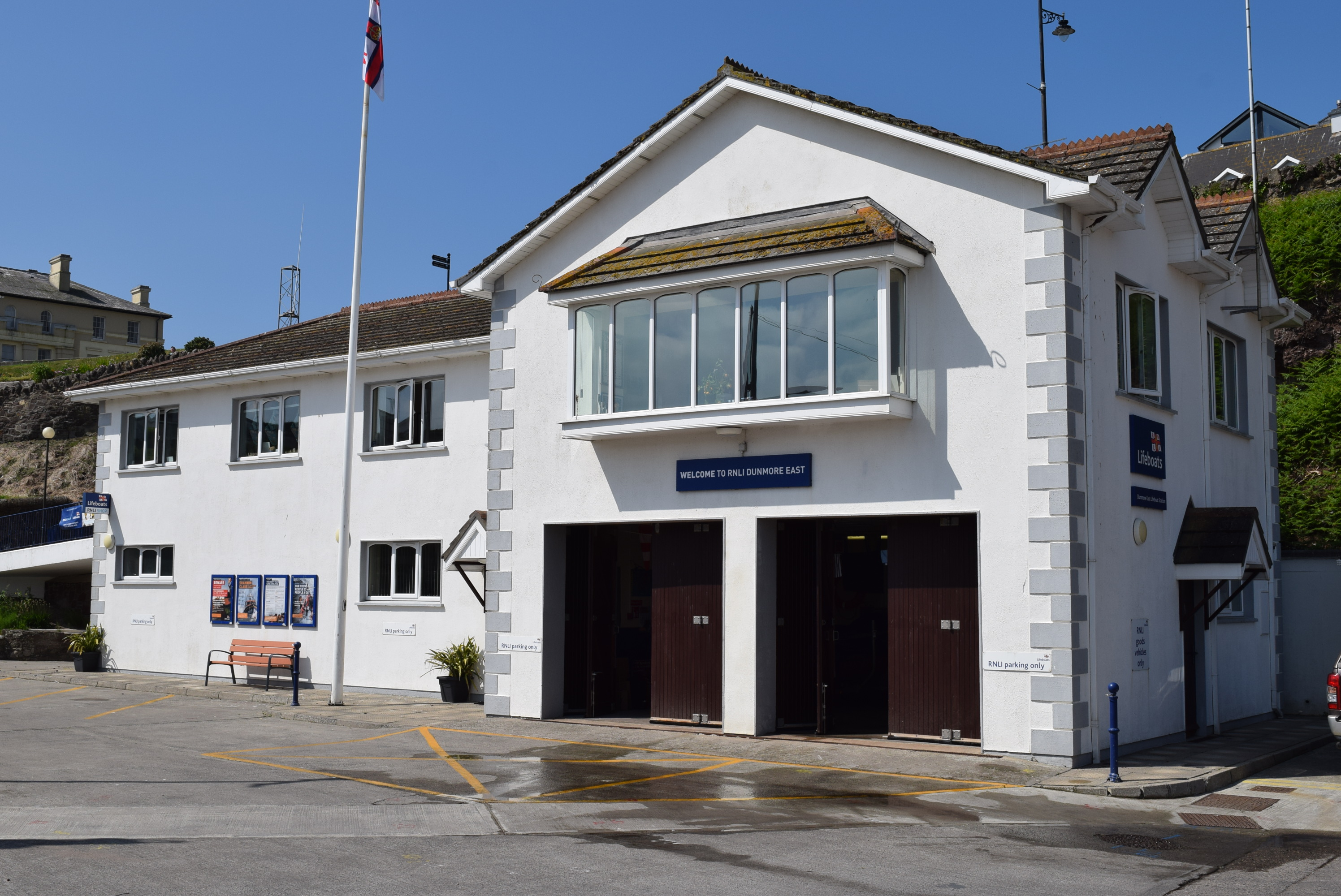
- Dunmore East Lifeboat Station

- Location within Ireland

General information
- Type: RNLI Lifeboat Station
- Location: West Wharf, The Harbour, Dunmore East, County Waterford, Ireland
- Coordinates: 52°08′49.0″N 6°59′31.9″W
- Opened: 1884
- Owner: Royal National Lifeboat Institution

Website
- Dunmore East RNLI Lifeboat Station

Dunmore East Lifeboat Station is located on West Wharf, at the harbour of Dunmore East, County Waterford, a town sitting on the western shore at the mouth of the River Suir, approximately 15 km (9.3 mi) south-east of Waterford, on the south coast of the Ireland.

A lifeboat station was established at Dunmore East by the Royal National Lifeboat Institution (RNLI) in 1884.

The station currently operates 13-41 William and Agnes Wray (ON 1348), an All-weather Shannon-class lifeboat, on station since 2021.

== History ==
Ever since its founding in 1824, the Royal National Institution for the Preservation of Life from Shipwreck (RNIPLS), later to become the RNLI in 1854, would award medals for deeds of gallantry at sea, even if no lifeboats were involved. Between 1834 and 1841, four Silver medals for gallantry were awarded in the vicinity of Dunmore East by the RNIPLS.

Following a visit to the area in 1882 by the Chief Inspector of Lifeboats, Capt. The Hon. Henry Weyland Chetwynd, RN, it was decided that a lifeboat be placed at Dunmore East. A boathouse and slipway, costing £613-5s-0d, were constructed by F. Kent. A 37 ft (11 m) self-righting 'Pulling and Sailing' (P&S) lifeboat, one with sails and (12) oars, was ordered from Forrestt of Limehouse, London, transported first by rail to Bristol, and then aboard the S.S. Reginald, arriving in Dunmore East in June 1884. The boat was provided from the legacy of Mr. H. Dodd of Rotherfield, Sussex, and named Henry Dodd (ON 101). Captain Cherry was appointed Coxswain.

At 11:30 on January 4, 1888, a flag of distress was hoisted by the crew of the Alfred D. Snow, of San Francisco, off Broomhill Point, Co. Wexford. Such were the conditions, that Capt. Cherry refused to launch the lifeboat, and immediately resigned his duties. Second Coxswain William Jones refused to accept the responsibility, but a former Tenby fisherman, Mr G. R. Woods, offered to command the lifeboat. It would be 14:30 before the lifeboat was launched, by which time, there were no survivors found from the American vessel. For his efforts, Mr Woods was awarded 'The Thanks of the Institution inscribed on Vellum'.

The Fanny Harriet (ON 617) was placed at Dunmore East in 1911. A lifeboat built by Thames Ironworks of Blackwall, London, and costing £1,107, was funded from the bequest of Miss F H Roe of Bath, Somerset. She would only be launched on service one time, but it would be in exceptional and tragic circumstances.

On Friday 20 February 1914, the Fethard lifeboat Helen Blake (ON 546) was smashed on the rocks, going to the aid of the Norwegian vessel Mexico, which was wrecked on the uninhabited Keeragh Islands. Nine lifeboatmen were washed away and drowned. The remaining five lifeboatmen scrambled ashore, and then still managed to rescue eight crew from the Mexico. For three days, the lifeboatmen and crew tried to survive the harsh conditions on the island, without food or water. One of the crew off the Mexico died of exposure. The Wexford, Kilmore Quay and Dunmore East lifeboats made many attempts to rescue the isolated men on the island, finally succeeding on Monday 23 February. Five RNLI Silver Medals for gallantry were awarded, along with silver medals from The King of Norway.

A much older boat, Michael Henry (ON 407), built in 1897, was placed on service afterwards in 1914, but it had been converted to be a motor-powered lifeboat in 1908. Launched three times and saving four people, it was found to be unfit for service in 1919, and withdrawn. The station would remain closed, until the provision of a new 45-foot Watson-class lifeboat in 1925. Provided from the legacies and estate of Mr Peter Coats and Miss Emily Smart, the new lifeboat was named C. and S. (ON 690).

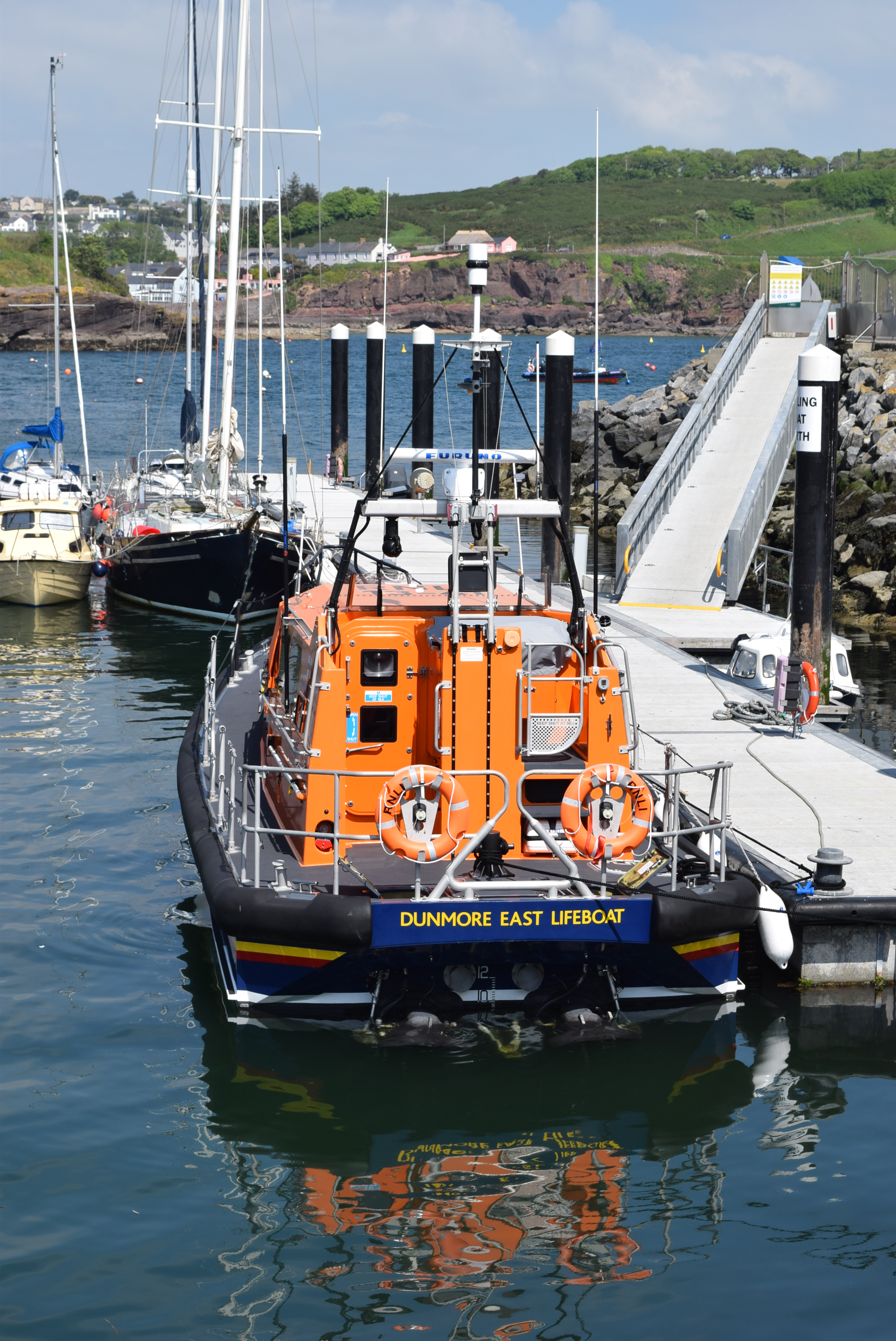
Dunmore East Shannon-class lifeboat 13-41 William and Agnes Wray (ON 1348)

In 1940, the 46-foot Watson-class lifeboat Annie Blanche Smith (ON 830) was placed on service. In the next 30 years on service, she would be launched 89 times, and rescue 88 lives. More remarkably, she would be involved in no less than four medal services. Coxswain Patrick Power was in command each time, and would receive the RNLI Bronze Medal for Gallantry in 1941, 1951, 1961 and 1964.

Dunmore East received a succession of different lifeboats after 1970, but 1975 would see the arrival of the Waveney-class lifeboat 44-014 St. Patrick (ON 1035). This boat would also see exceptional service over the next twenty years, being launched 252 times, and saving 83 lives. Coxswain Stephen Whittle would add a second RNLI Bronze Medal to his previous awards of silver and bronze medals, for the rescue of a fisherman in 1976.

After 25 years on station, Trent-class lifeboat 14-17 Elizabeth and Ronald (ON 1215) was transferred to the relief fleet, and Dunmore East would receive a Shannon-class lifeboat, costing over €2.4 million. 13-41 William and Agnes Wray arrived on station on 26 September 2021.

== Lily B ==
On 20 October 2020, during Storm Barbara, the 100-metre (330 ft) general cargo vessel Lily B, carrying 4000 tonnes of coal from Germany, and with nine crew aboard, lost all power, 2 miles (3.2 km) off Hook Head. With the vessel now drifting towards the shore, the Severn-class lifeboat from Rosslare Harbour, the Kilmore Quay Tamar-class and the Trent-class lifeboat from Dunmore East, were all tasked, along with the Irish Coast Guard Rescue 117 Helicopter.

In gale-force eight conditions, gusting to gale-force nine, with waves of 8–10 metres (26–33 ft) in height, some of the worst conditions encountered by many of the lifeboat crew, tow lines were eventually secured to the vessel, and the operation began, to tow the vessel away from the shore. After three hours, the Tugboat Tramontane arrived on scene, at 32 m (105 ft) long, twice the size of any of the lifeboats, and commenced a tow. With the three lifeboats standing by, the Lily B was brought to the sheltered waters of the Waterford estuary. The lifeboats had been on service for over 12 hours.

In what is thought to be a unique event within the RNLI, "for their fine display of seamanship and boat-handling skills in atrocious weather conditions, in securing a tow and determination to succeed resulting in the saving of nine lives", the coxswains of all three lifeboats, Roy Abrahamsson (Dunmore East), Eugene Kehoe (Kilmore Quay) and Eamon O'Rourke (Rosslare Harbour), were each awarded the RNLI Bronze Medal for the same service, with "Medal Service Certificates" presented to each crew member.

== Station honours ==
The following are awards made at Dunmore East:

- RNIPLS Silver Medal
  Lt. Thomas Stuart, RN, H.M. Coastguard, Cushenden – 1834
  Richard Ross, Chief Boatman, H.M. Coastguard, Dunmore – 1835
  Lt. Thomas Stuart, RN, H.M. Coastguard, Dunmore – 1838 (Second-service award)
  Charles French, Chief Officer, H.M. Coastguard, Ballymacaw – 1841
- RNLI Silver Medal
  Sgt. Thomas Sutcliffe, Royal Irish Constabulary – 1889
  Walter Power, Coxswain – 1914
  Cmdr. Thomas Holmes, RN, Chief Inspector of Lifeboats – 1914
  Stephen Whittle, Coxswain/Mechanic – 1971
- Silver Medal, awarded by The King of Norway
  Walter Power, Coxswain – 1914
  Cmdr. Thomas Holmes, RN, Chief Inspector of Lifeboats – 1914
- RNLI Bronze Medal
  Patrick Power, Second Coxswain – 1941
  Patrick Power, Coxswain – 1951 (Second-Service clasp)
  Richard Power, Second Coxswain – 1951
  Patrick Power, Coxswain – 1961 (Third-Service clasp)
  Patrick Power, Coxswain – 1964 (Fourth-Service clasp)
  Stephen Whittle, Second Coxswain – 1964
  John Power, Assistant Mechanic – 1964
  Stephen Whittle, Coxswain/Mechanic – 1976 (Second-Service clasp)
  Roy Abrahamsson, Coxswain – 2021
- The Maud Smith Award 1960
  (for the bravest act of lifesaving during the year by a member of a lifeboat crew)
  Patrick Power, Coxswain – 1961
- Medal Service Certificate
  Richard Murphy, Motor Mechanic – 1964
  S. Power, Bowman – 1964
  A. Westcott-Pitt, Honorary Secretary – 1964
  W. Westcott-Pitt, crew member – 1964
  Capt. C. H. Hazell, crew member – 1964
  Sir Brian Warren, crew member – 1964
  Dr. M. V. McCabe, crew member – 1964
  John Power, Second Coxswain – 1971
  Brendan Horgan, Reserve Mechanic – 1971
  Sean Kearns, Assistant Mechanic – 1971
  Joseph Murphy, crew member – 1971
  John Whitty, crew member – 1971
  John Walsh, Second Coxswain – 1976
  Brendan Glody, Assistant Mechanic – 1976
  Stanley Power, crew member – 1976
  Keiran O'Dwyer, crew member – 1976
  Louis O'Dwyer, crew member – 1976
  Joseph Murphy, crew member – 1976
  David Murray, Mechanic – 2021
  Neville Murphy, Navigator – 2021
  Peter Curran, crew member – 2021
  Luka Sweeney, crew member – 2021
  Kevin Dingley, crew member – 2021
  Jon Walsh, crew member – 2021
- 'The Thanks of the Institution inscribed on Vellum'
  G. R. Woods, Acting Coxswain – 1888
  Stephen Whittle, Coxswain/Mechanic – 1975
- Vellum Service Certificates
  John Walsh, Second Coxswain – 1975
  John Curtin, Reserve Mechanic – 1975
  Sean Kearns, Assistant Mechanic – 1975
  Brendan Glody, crew member – 1975
  Joseph Murphy, crew member – 1975
  John R. Tod, crew member – 1975
- 'A Framed Letter of Thanks signed by the Chairman of the Institution'
  Stephen Whittle, Coxswain/Mechanic – 1981
  Sean Kearns, Assistant Mechanic – 1981
  Patrick Glody, crew member – 1981
  Joseph Murphy, Coxswain – 2001
  Joseph Murphy, Coxswain – 2006
- 'A Collective Letter of Thanks signed by the Chairman of the Institution'
  Dunmore East Lifeboat Station – 2006
- Exceptional First Aid Certificate
  Neville Murphy, crew member – 2006
- A special framed certificate
  Coxswain and Dunmore East Lifeboat Crew – 1979 (fastnet race)

== Roll of honour ==
In memory of those lost whilst serving at Dunmore East:

- On service to the barque Allegro, on 13 December 1893
  Philip Boutcher, crew member (22)

== Dunmore East lifeboats ==
=== Pulling and Sailing (P&S) lifeboats ===
ON (Note: ON is the RNLI's Official Number of the boat.)	Name	Built	On station	Class	Comments
101	Henry Dodd	1884	1884–1911	37-foot self-righting (P&S)	(Note: 37 ft 0 in (11.28 m) x 9 ft 0 in (2.74 m) (12-oared) self-righting (P&S) lifeboat, legacy of Mr H. Dodd of Rotherfield, Sussex, built by Forrestt of Limehouse, London, costing £395.); Sold in 1912.
617	Fanny Harriet	1911	1911–1914	37-foot self-righting (P&S)	(Note: 37 ft 0 in (11.28 m) x 9 ft 3 in (2.82 m) (10-oared) self-righting (P&S) lifeboat, legacy of Miss F. H. Roe of Bath, built by Thames Ironworks of Blackwall, London, costing £1,107.); Transferred to Holyhead No. 2.

=== Motor lifeboats ===
ON	Op.No. (Note: Op.No. is the RNLI's Operational Number of the boat carried on the hull.)	Name	Built	On station	Class	Comments
407	–	Michael Henry	1897	1914–1919	37-foot self righting (Motor)	(Note: 37 ft 0 in (11.28 m) x 9 ft 3 in (2.82 m) self-righting (motor) lifeboat, gift of the Jewish Scholars LB fund, built by Thames Ironworks of Blackwall, London, with 24-hp motor conversion in 1908, costing £728 when new.); Previously at Newhaven.
Station Closed 1919–1925
690	–	C. and S.	1925	1925–1940	45-foot Watson	Transferred to Pwllheli.
830	–	Annie Blanche Smith	1940	1940–1970	46-foot Watson	
896	–	Douglas Hyde	1951	1970–1972	46-foot 9in Watson	Previously at Rosslare Harbour.
814	–	Dunleary II	1938	1972–1973	46-foot Watson	Previously at Dún Laoghaire and Lochinver.
912	–	Euphrosyne Kendal	1954	1973–1975	52-foot Barnett (Mk.1)	Previously at St Peter Port.
1035	44-014	St. Patrick	1974	1975–1996	Waveney	
1215	14-17	Elizabeth and Ronald	1996	1996–2021	Trent	
1348	13-41	William and Agnes Wray	2021	2021–	Shannon	

More post-service details can be found on the respective lifeboat class pages.

== See also ==
- List of RNLI stations
- List of former RNLI stations
- Royal National Lifeboat Institution lifeboats

== Sources ==
- Leonard, Richie; Denton, Tony (2026). Lifeboat Enthusiasts Handbook 2026. Lifeboats Enthusiasts' Society.
