= Lochinver Lifeboat Station =

RNLI Lifeboat station in Highland, Scotland

- Lochinver Lifeboat Station in 2021

- Location within Sutherland

General information
- Type: RNLI Lifeboat Station
- Location: Harbour Road, Lochinver, Scotland
- Coordinates: 58°08′48.5″N 5°14′51.9″W
- Opened: 18 August 1967
- Owner: Royal National Lifeboat Institution

Website
- Lochinver RNLI Lifeboat Station

Lochinver Lifeboat Station is located at Harbour Road in Lochinver, a harbour town at the head of Loch Inver, on the north-west coast of Scotland.

A lifeboat was first placed at Lochinver by the Royal National Lifeboat Institution (RNLI) on 18 August 1967.

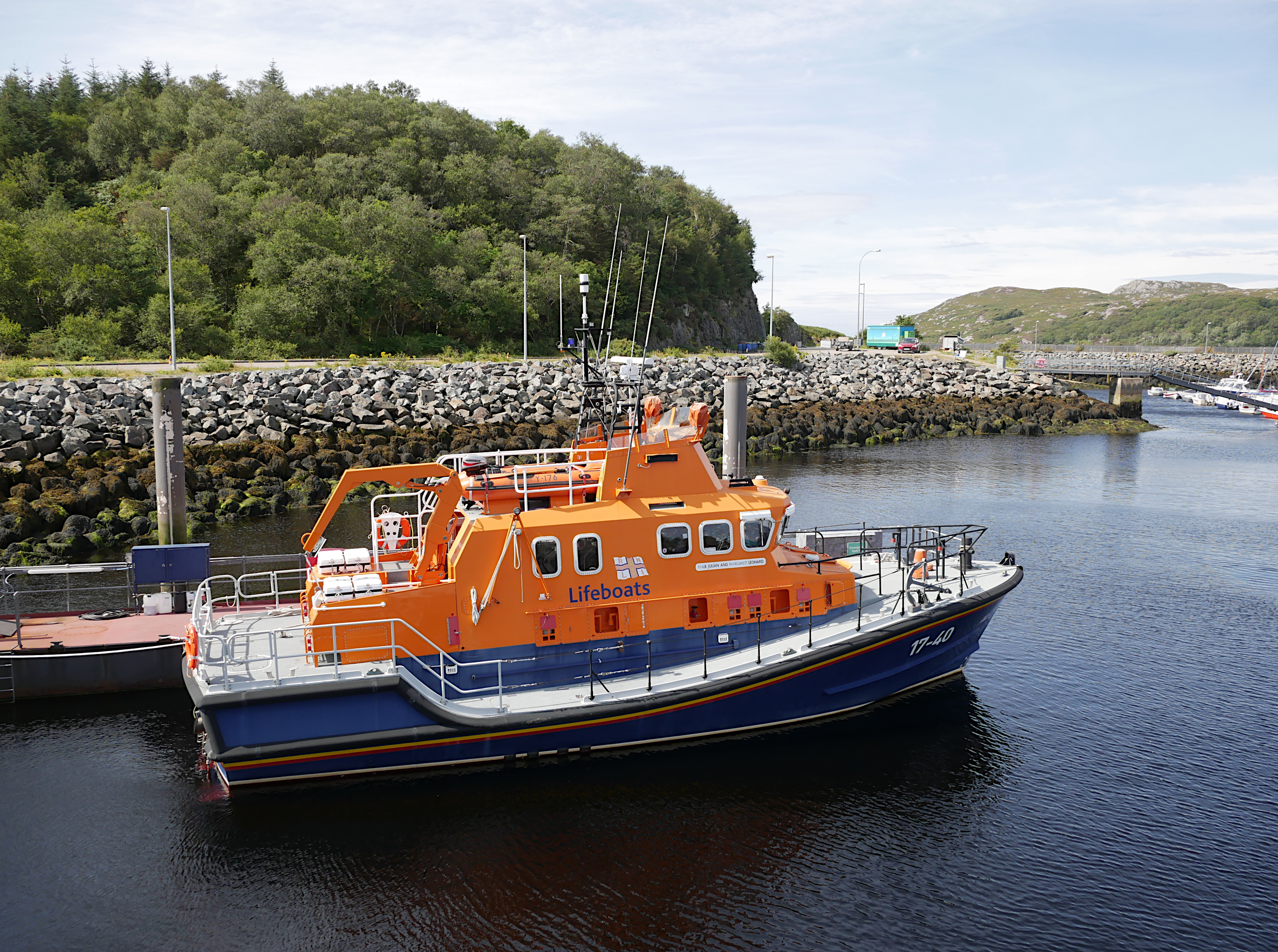
Severn-class All-weather lifeboat, 17-40 Julian and Margaret Leonard (ON 1271)

The station currently operates a Severn-class All-weather lifeboat, 17-40 Julian and Margaret Leonard (ON 1271), on station since 2003.

== History ==
During the winter of 1966–1967, lifeboat trials were carried out at Lochinver. Following a review of both trials and future requirements by the RNLI, it was decided to place an All-weather lifeboat at Lochinver.

On 18 August 1967, the 46-foot Watson-class lifeboat Dunleary II (ON 814) was initially placed on service at Lochinver. Built in 1938, she had already served 29 years at Dún Laoghaire, and was in her last few years of service.

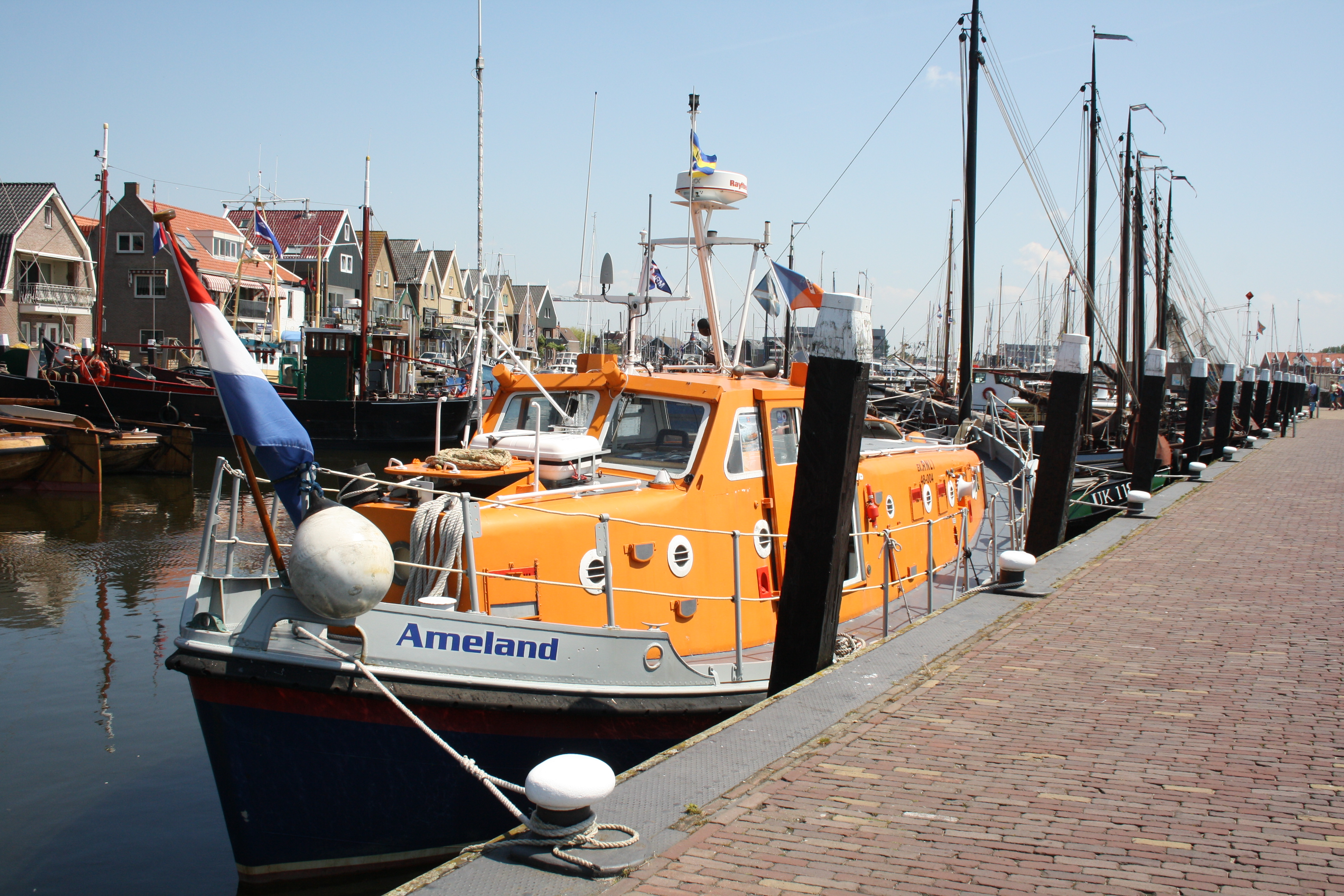
48-004 George Urie Scott (ON 1007), now Highlander at Amelands, Netherlands

Lochinver's permanent lifeboat, a 48-foot 6in Oakley Mk.III, more commonly known as a Solent-class lifeboat, arrived on 25 July 1969. Built by Groves and Guttridge of Cowes, 48-004 George Urie Scott (ON 1007) was funded by Mrs George Urie Scott, and cost approximately £70,000. Unlike the earlier Oakley lifeboats, the Solent had a steel hull, sub-divided by watertight bulk-heads. It was powered by twin Gardner 6LX engines. This class of life-boat required a crew of seven, and could carry a maximum of about 100 survivors.

Between 1978 and 1985, the Solent-class lifeboat was replaced with a MkII 52-foot Barnett-class (Mk.II) lifeboat, the Ramsay Dyce (ON 944). Built by Groves and Guttridge in 1958, she too was another boat at the end of her service life. When she was retired in 1985, in what is probably a unique circumstance for a lifeboat station, the previous lifeboat, 48-004 George Urie Scott (ON 1007), was brought back to the station, and served for another four years. In 1989, the station would receive the 52 ft (16 m) Arun-class lifeboat 52-42 Murray Lornie (ON 1144).

Retired lifeboat Ramsay Dyce (ON 944) would perform one more service on 3 May 1992. Sold from service, and used as a dive boat, she responded to a coastguard alert, to any vessels in the Ardmucknish Bay area, for a small inflatable boat with 5 divers, having suffered engine failure. The former lifeboat was soon with the boat, and all were returned to Dunstaffnage Bay.

In 1992, the RNLI would receive an extraordinary bequest, a sum of £4 million from the estate of Mrs Eugenie Boucher, specifically to be used for the construction of new boathouses. A native of Penza in Russia, eight so named 'Penza' boathouses would be constructed, including the one at Lochinver.

A new Severn-class lifeboat was placed at Lochinver on 25 November 2003, and in 2004, a new pontoon berth was constructed, at a cost of £291,798. At a ceremony on 17 April 2004, the Severn-class lifeboat was named 17-40 Julian and Margaret Leonard (ON 1271).

At 19:59 on Sunday 7 December 2014, Stornoway Coastguard received a distress call from the fish carrier Norholm, drifting towards Cape Wrath in gale-force winds, with no power, and 4 people aboard. Julian and Margaret Leonard was launched at 20:39, arriving with the vessel nearly two hours later at 22:24. In worsening weather, hail stones, with thunder and lightning, getting a line thrown across to the vessel proved impossible, so with skilful seamanship in difficult conditions, a line was floated over to the Norholm, and a tow commenced. Eventually, the vessel was brought 2 miles (3.2 km) off-shore, and at midnight, the rescue helicopter was stood down. The Thurso lifeboat was called to take over at 01:45, with the Lochinver lifeboat returning to base at 07:45. For this service, Coxswain David MacAskill was awarded the RNLI Bronze Medal.

On 10 January 2024, Coxswain David MacAskill was formally appointed as a deputy lord lieutenant for Sutherland, and was further honoured, when he was recognised with an MBE in the 2026 King's Birthday Honours.

== Station honours ==
The following are awards made at Lochinver:

- RNLI Bronze Medal
  David MacAskill, Coxswain – 2016
- 'A Framed Letter of Thanks signed by the Chairman of the Institution'
  Stuart Gudgeon, Mechanic – 2016
  Robert Kinnaird, Navigator – 2016
  James MacAskill, crew member – 2016
  John K. Templeton, crew member – 2016
  Joseph MacKay, crew member – 2016
  Lachlan D. MacAskill, crew member – 2016
- Member, Order of the British Empire (MBE)
  David Isbister MacAskill, DL, Coxswain – 2026KBH

== Lochinver lifeboats ==
| ON (Note: ON is the RNLI's Official Number of the boat.) | Op.No. (Note: Op.No. is the RNLI's Operational Number of the boat carried on the hull.) | Name | Built | On Station | Class | Comments |
|---|---|---|---|---|---|---|
| 814 | – | Dunleary II | 1938 | 1967–1969 | 46-foot Watson | Previously at Dún Laoghaire. Transferred to the Relief fleet, later at Dunmore East. |
| 1007 | 48-004 | George Urie Scott | 1969 | 1969–1978 | Solent | Transferred to Rosslare Harbour. |
| 944 | – | Ramsay Dyce | 1958 | 1978–1985 | 52-foot Barnett (Mk. II) | |
| 1007 | 48-004 | George Urie Scott | 1969 | 1985–1989 | Solent | Returned after five years at Rosslare Harbour. Later transferred to the Relief fleet. |
| 1144 | 52-42 | Murray Lornie | 1988 | 1989–2003 | Arun | Transferred to the Relief fleet. Later at Castletownbere. |
| 1271 | 17-40 | Julian and Margaret Leonard | 2003 | 2003– | Severn | |

More post-service details can be found on the respective lifeboat class pages.

== See also ==
- List of RNLI stations
- List of former RNLI stations
- Royal National Lifeboat Institution lifeboats
