= 46ft Watson-class lifeboat =

Former RNLI lifeboat class

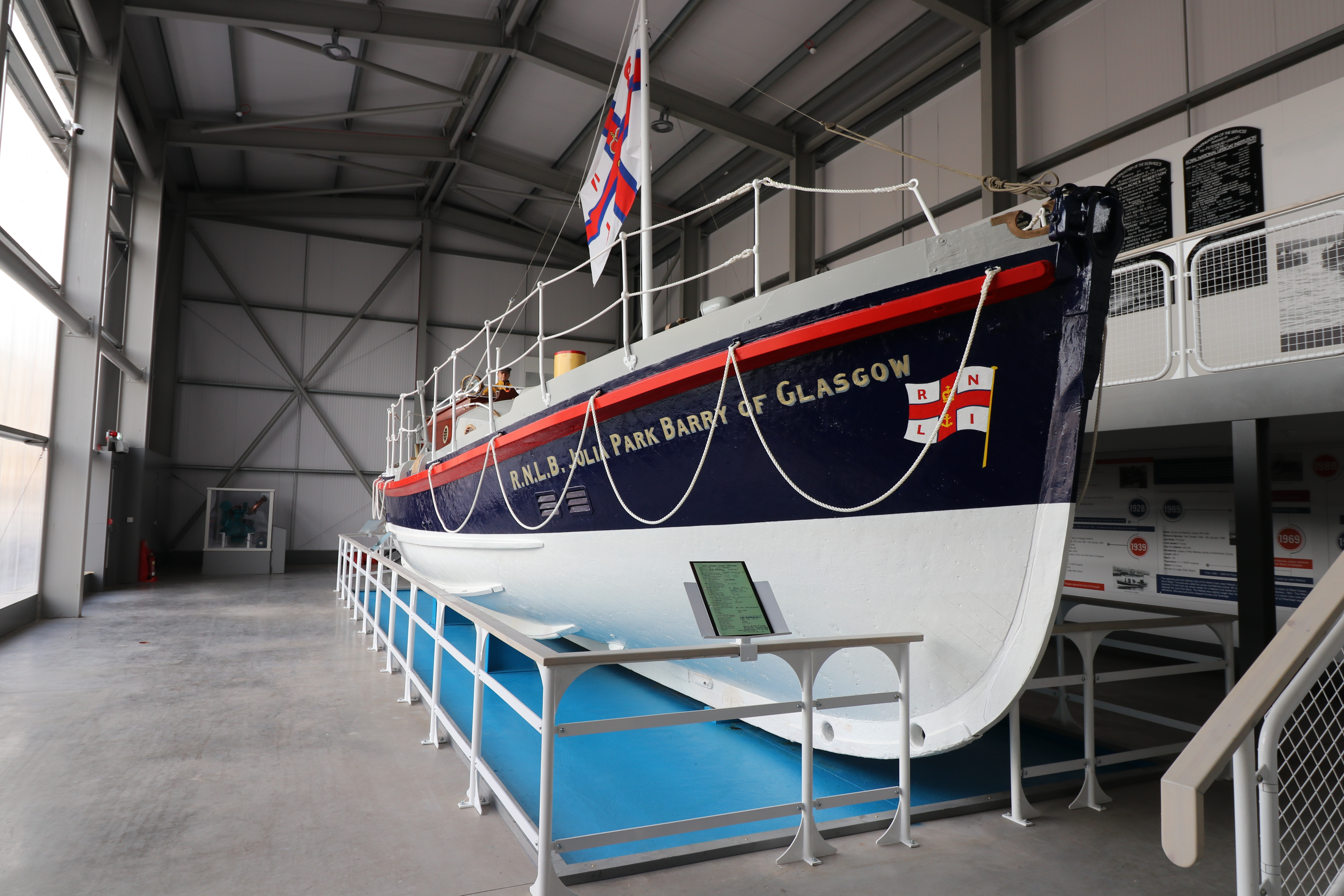
- Julia Park Barry of Glasgow (ON 819) at Admiralty Gateway / Peterhead Prison Museum, 2019.

Class overview
- Name: 46ft Watson-class
- Builders: Groves & Guttridge, Cowes; Alexander Robertson & Sons, Sandbank, Argyll; J. Samuel White, Cowes; Sussex Yacht Co., Shoreham; Morgan Giles, Teignmouth; Rowhedge Ironworks, Rowhedge
- Operators: RNLI
- Preceded by: 45ft 6in Watson-class
- Succeeded by: 46ft 9in Watson-class
- Cost: £7,308–£17,048
- Built: 1935–1946
- In service: 1935–1981
- Completed: 28
- Lost: 2
- Retired: 26

General characteristics
- Class & type: 46ft Watson motor lifeboat
- Displacement: 21 tons
- Length: 46 ft (14 m)
- Beam: 12 ft 9 in (3.89 m)
- Propulsion: 2 x 40-bhp Weyburn CE4 4-cyl. petrol; 2 x 40-bhp Ferry VE4 4-cyl. diesel
- Speed: 8 knots
- Crew: 8

The 46 ft Watson-class was a non-self-righting displacement hull lifeboat, built between 1935 and 1946, and operated by the Royal National Lifeboat Institution (RNLI) between 1935 and 1981.

== Description ==
The 46 ft Watson initially had an aft cockpit with a shelter containing the engine controls. Ahead of the shelter was the exhaust funnel and ahead of the mast was a small forward shelter. On ON 805 and 815, the cockpit shelter was lengthened, with the funnel mounted on its forward end and these two featured end boxes. ON 820 also had the lengthened shelter but retained a flush deck. From ON 828 the forward shelter was deleted. Two boats, ON 840 and ON 846 had midships cockpits, ahead of the funnel, with a shelter ahead of it as well as the rear shelter.

Four of the first five boats had two 40-bhp Weyburn CE4 4-cylinder petrol engines, but the fourth, ON 787, was fitted with two 40-bhp Ferry VE4 4-cylinder diesels, making it the first RNLI lifeboat to be built with diesel engines. The diesels became standard from the sixth boat onwards.

In the mid sixties, seven boats were re-engined with 65-bhp Ford-based Parsons Barracuda 6-cylinder diesels, after trials with Canadian Pacific (ON 803), which had been fitted with 47-bhp Parsons Marlin diesels in 1961, and then re-engined a second time, with the Parsons Barracuda in 1963.

The 46 ft type was one of the last to be adapted to suit the conditions at individual stations, with shallower draft versions (ON 805, 815, 820 and 838) being supplied to four stations, all constructed by J. Samuel White of Cowes. This practice ceased after World War Two, with lifeboats constructed to standard designs.

The 46 ft Watson-class lifeboats were long-lived, most reaching more than thirty-years-service and some topping forty years.

== Boat-builders yard fire ==
On 18 June 1937, a fire at the boatbuilders yard of Groves and Guttridge in Cowes on the Isle of Wight destroyed three lifeboats, and a large quantity of timber. A fourth lifeboat had fortunately been dispatched to Blackpool only 15 hours earlier. The fire completely destroyed the 46 ft Watson-class S. G. E (ON 787), built in 1936, which had been returned to the manufacturers for maintenance work.

== Fleet ==
=== 46ft Watson-class (std) ===
ON (Note: ON is the RNLI's Official Number of the boat.)	Name	Built	In service	Stations	Comments
777	H. F. Bailey	1935	1935–1945	Cromer No.1	(Note: Legacy of Mr H. F Bailey, built by Groves and Guttridge of Cowes, with twin 40-hp Weyburn CE4 4-cyl. petrol engines, and internal rudder, costing £7,308.)Sold in 1973. On display since 2009 at the Henry Blogg Museum, Cromer. In storage during museum refurbishment. February 2026.
777	H. F. Bailey	1935	1946–1960	Helvick Head	Sold in 1973. On display since 2009 at the Henry Blogg Museum, Cromer. In storage during museum refurbishment. February 2026.
777	H. F. Bailey	1935	1960–1973	Relief fleet	Sold in 1973. On display since 2009 at the Henry Blogg Museum, Cromer. In storage during museum refurbishment. February 2026.
778	Edward and Isabella Irwin	1935	1935–1963	Sunderland	(Note: Legacy of Mrs Irwin, built by Groves and Guttridge of Cowes, with twin 40-hp Weyburn CE4 4-cyl. petrol engines, costing £7,378.) Sold 1971. Renamed Lady Clare C. Last reported as the hull of Edward and Isabella Irwin at Liverpool Sailing Club, Garston, Liverpool, May 2018.
778	Edward and Isabella Irwin	1935	1963–1966	Relief fleet	Sold 1971. Renamed Lady Clare C. Last reported as the hull of Edward and Isabella Irwin at Liverpool Sailing Club, Garston, Liverpool, May 2018.
778	Edward and Isabella Irwin	1935	1966–1967	Cromer	Sold 1971. Renamed Lady Clare C. Last reported as the hull of Edward and Isabella Irwin at Liverpool Sailing Club, Garston, Liverpool, May 2018.
778	Edward and Isabella Irwin	1935	1967–1969	Relief fleet	Sold 1971. Renamed Lady Clare C. Last reported as the hull of Edward and Isabella Irwin at Liverpool Sailing Club, Garston, Liverpool, May 2018.
784	Civil Service No.6	1935	1936–1956	St Davids	(Note: Gift of the Civil Service LB fund, built by Groves and Guttridge of Cowes, with twin 40-hp Weyburn CE4 4-cyl. petrol engines, costing £7,618.); Renamed Swn-Y-Mor (Civil Service No.6) in 1956.
784	Swn-Y-Mor (Civil Service No.6)	1935	1956–1963	St Davids	Sold February 1973. Renamed Swn-y-Mor. At Suffolk Yacht Harbour, November 2025.
784	Swn-Y-Mor (Civil Service No.6)	1935	1964–1967	Eyemouth	Sold February 1973. Renamed Swn-y-Mor. At Suffolk Yacht Harbour, November 2025.
784	Swn-Y-Mor (Civil Service No.6)	1935	1967–1972	Relief fleet	Sold February 1973. Renamed Swn-y-Mor. At Suffolk Yacht Harbour, November 2025.
787	S.G.E.	1936	1936–1937	Yarmouth	(Note: Legacies of Mr Altschul, Miss Gartside and Mr Edmunds, built by Groves and Guttridge of Cowes, costing £8,505.); Destroyed by fire at Groves & Guttridge, 18 June 1937.
788	Jeanie Spiers	1936	1937–1961	Portpatrick	(Note: Gift of Mrs Paterson, built by Alexander Robertson & Sons of Sandbank, Argyll, with internal rudder, and twin 40-hp Weyburn CE4 4-cyl. petrol engines, costing £8,434.) Sold April 1961. Believed lost at Largs, 1974.
789	R.P.L.	1936	1937–1962	Howth	(Note: Legacies of Mr Rignal, Miss Phillips and Mrs Butterworth, built by Groves and Guttridge of Cowes, with internal rudder, costing £8,191.) Sold September 1962. Renamed Blue Gannet, Southern Cross and Maid of Sker. Destroyed by fire at Grangetown, Cardiff, April 1999.
790	John and Charles Kennedy	1936	1937–1953	Fraserburgh	(Note: Legacy of Mrs Kennedy, built by Groves and Guttridge of Cowes, costing £8,178.); Capsized on service with six crew lost, 9 February 1953, and subsequently broken up.
801	Sir Arthur Rose	1938	1938–1947	Tobermory	(Note: Gift of Miss M. Lithgow, built by Alexander Robertson & Sons of Sandbank, Argyll, with internal rudder, costing £8,358.) Sold February 1973. Renamed Belmura. Last reported as Rose Marion at Tidemill Yacht Harbour, Woodbridge, Suffolk, May 2022.
801	Sir Arthur Rose	1938	1948–1957	Mallaig	Sold February 1973. Renamed Belmura. Last reported as Rose Marion at Tidemill Yacht Harbour, Woodbridge, Suffolk, May 2022.
801	Sir Arthur Rose	1938	1958–1969	Courtmacsherry Harbour	Sold February 1973. Renamed Belmura. Last reported as Rose Marion at Tidemill Yacht Harbour, Woodbridge, Suffolk, May 2022.
801	Sir Arthur Rose	1938	1969–1973	Relief fleet	Sold February 1973. Renamed Belmura. Last reported as Rose Marion at Tidemill Yacht Harbour, Woodbridge, Suffolk, May 2022.
802	City of Edinburgh	1938	1938–1968	Wick	(Note: Funded by the RNLI, built by Alexander Robertson & Sons of Sandbank, Argyll, with internal rudder, costing £8,155. Twin 65-bhp Parsons Ford Barracuda 6-cyl. diesel engines, 1966.) Sold July 1976. Renamed Stadab. As Saltire at South Harbour, Whitehaven, September 2025.
802	City of Edinburgh	1938	1969–1976	Relief fleet	Sold July 1976. Renamed Stadab. As Saltire at South Harbour, Whitehaven, September 2025.
803	Canadian Pacific	1938	1938–1969	Selsey	(Note: Gift of the Canadian Pacific Steamship Co., built by Alexander Robertson & Sons of Sandbank, Argyll, with internal rudder, costing £8,314. Twin 47-bhp Parsons Ford Marlin 6-cyl. diesel engines, 1961, and twin 65-bhp Parsons Ford Barracuda 6-cyl. diesel engines, 1963.) Sold February 1978. Renamed Scrabster Pilot, Kelmar, and Tusack. In unaltered condition as Canadian Pacific at Dornie, Kyle of Lochalsh, September 2024.
803	Canadian Pacific	1938	1969–1970	Sheerness	Sold February 1978. Renamed Scrabster Pilot, Kelmar, and Tusack. In unaltered condition as Canadian Pacific at Dornie, Kyle of Lochalsh, September 2024.
803	Canadian Pacific	1938	1970–1977	Relief fleet	Sold February 1978. Renamed Scrabster Pilot, Kelmar, and Tusack. In unaltered condition as Canadian Pacific at Dornie, Kyle of Lochalsh, September 2024.
804	S.G.E.	1938	1938–1943	Yarmouth	(Note: Legacies of Mr Altschul, Miss Gartside and Mr Edmunds, built by J. Samuel White of Cowes, with internal rudder, costing £8,266.); Replacement for ON 787. Sold April 1964. Renamed John Dutton at Saint Helena. Believed lost in 2000.
804	S.G.E.	1938	1943–1945	Relief fleet	Replacement for ON 787. Sold April 1964. Renamed John Dutton at Saint Helena. Believed lost in 2000.
804	S.G.E.	1938	1945–1963	Yarmouth	Replacement for ON 787. Sold April 1964. Renamed John Dutton at Saint Helena. Believed lost in 2000.
814	Dunleary II	1938	1938–1967	Dún Laoghaire	(Note: Fundedby the RNLI, built by J. Samuel White of Cowes, with internal rudder, costing £8,258.) Sold August 1974. At Wapping Wharf, Bristol, August 2025.
814	Dunleary II	1938	1967–1969	Lochinver	Sold August 1974. At Wapping Wharf, Bristol, August 2025.
814	Dunleary II	1938	1969–1972	Relief fleet	Sold August 1974. At Wapping Wharf, Bristol, August 2025.
814	Dunleary II	1938	1972–1973	Dunmore East	Sold August 1974. At Wapping Wharf, Bristol, August 2025.
818	Mabel Marion Thompson	1939	1939–1952	Rosslare Harbour	(Note: Legacy of Miss Thompson, built by J. Samuel White of Cowes, with internal rudder, costing £9,649.) Sold April 1975. Renamed Carstiona .Last reported under restoration at Kinvarra, County Galway, December 2011.
818	Mabel Marion Thompson	1939	1952–1968	Galway Bay	Sold April 1975. Renamed Carstiona .Last reported under restoration at Kinvarra, County Galway, December 2011.
818	Mabel Marion Thompson	1939	1968–1970	Arranmore	Sold April 1975. Renamed Carstiona .Last reported under restoration at Kinvarra, County Galway, December 2011.
818	Mabel Marion Thompson	1939	1970–1974	Relief fleet	Sold April 1975. Renamed Carstiona .Last reported under restoration at Kinvarra, County Galway, December 2011.
819	Julia Park Barry of Glasgow	1939	1939–1969	Peterhead	(Note: Gift of Mrs Park-Barry, built by Alexander Robertson & Sons of Sandbank, Argyll, costing £9,055. Twin 65-bhp Parsons Ford Barracuda 6-cyl. diesel engines, 1964.) Sold March 1979. Renamed Savell-o-Hicks. Fully restored, on display as Julia Park Barry of Glasgow at Admiralty Gateway / Peterhead Prison Museum, December 2025.
819	Julia Park Barry of Glasgow	1939	1969–1979	Relief fleet	Sold March 1979. Renamed Savell-o-Hicks. Fully restored, on display as Julia Park Barry of Glasgow at Admiralty Gateway / Peterhead Prison Museum, December 2025.
821	The Good Hope	1939	1939–1972	Montrose No.1	(Note: An anonymous gift, built by Alexander Robertson & Sons of Sandbank, Argyll, costing £9,070. Shelter added, 1966, Twin 65-bhp Parsons Ford Barracuda 6-cyl. diesel engines, 1966.) Sold in 1981. Renamed Myra Jane, Soraya, and The Good Hope of Montrose. Last reported at Albion dockyard, Bristol, August 2021.
821	The Good Hope	1939	1972–1980	Relief fleet	Sold in 1981. Renamed Myra Jane, Soraya, and The Good Hope of Montrose. Last reported at Albion dockyard, Bristol, August 2021.
822	Jesse Lumb	1939	1939–1970	Bembridge	(Note: Legacy of Miss Lumb, built by J. Samuel White of Cowes, costing £9,455. Shelter added, 1964. Twin 65-bhp Parsons Ford Barracuda 6-cyl. diesel engines, 1964.) Sold July 1981. Previously at Imperial War Museum Duxford, now at the Classic Boat Museum, West Cowes, Isle of Wight, December 2025.
822	Jesse Lumb	1939	1970–1980	Relief fleet	Sold July 1981. Previously at Imperial War Museum Duxford, now at the Classic Boat Museum, West Cowes, Isle of Wight, December 2025.
828	The Princess Royal (Civil Service No.7)	1939	1939–1968	Hartlepool	(Note: Gift of the Civil Service LB fund, built by J. Samuel White of Cowes, costing £9,455. Shelter added, 1964. Twin 65-bhp Parsons Ford Barracuda 6-cyl. diesel engines, 1964.) Sold 1976. Renamed La Rochelle. Stored as The Princess Royal at Hartlepool Marina, December 2025.
828	The Princess Royal (Civil Service No.7)	1939	1968–1969	Humber No.2	Sold 1976. Renamed La Rochelle. Stored as The Princess Royal at Hartlepool Marina, December 2025.
828	The Princess Royal (Civil Service No.7)	1939	1969–1976	Relief fleet	Sold 1976. Renamed La Rochelle. Stored as The Princess Royal at Hartlepool Marina, December 2025.
829	Crawford and Constance Conybeare	1939	1940–1968	Falmouth	(Note: Gift of Mrs Conybeare, built by J. Samuel White of Cowes, costing £10,268.) Sold August 1974; Renamed Three Seas, Bilitis and Connie. Last reported being shipped to Singapore, January 1997.
829	Crawford and Constance Conybeare	1939	1968–1974	Relief fleet	Sold August 1974; Renamed Three Seas, Bilitis and Connie. Last reported being shipped to Singapore, January 1997.
830	Annie Blanche Smith	1940	1940–1970	Dunmore East	(Note: Legacies of Mrs Smith and Mrs Lucas, and funds from the executors of the late Mr Stephens, built by J. Samuel White of Cowes, with internal rudder, costing £10,279.) Sold July 1971; Renamed Dunmore East Lifeboat. Later reverted to Annie Blanche Smith, but broken up at Bideford Quay, September 2011.
830	Annie Blanche Smith	1940	1970–1971	Relief fleet	Sold July 1971; Renamed Dunmore East Lifeboat. Later reverted to Annie Blanche Smith, but broken up at Bideford Quay, September 2011.
842	(Millie Walton)	1940	No	(Douglas)	Destroyed in air raid during build at Groves & Guttridge, Cowes, 4 May 1942.
843	(Charles Henry Ashley)	1940	No	(Porthdinllaen)	Destroyed in air raid during build at Groves & Guttridge, Cowes, 4 May 1942.
841	Manchester and Salford XXIX	1943	1943–1953	Pwllheli	(Note: Gift of the Manchester and Salford LB fund, built by J. Samuel White of Cowes, with stern cockpit, costing £11,912.) Sold August 1974; Renamed Maureen Mary, Paul David II, and Frederick William. A houseboat, Manchester and Salford XXIX RNLI ON 841 at A. W. Marine, Canvey Island, July 2024.
841	Manchester and Salford XXIX	1943	1953–1972	Workington	Sold August 1974; Renamed Maureen Mary, Paul David II, and Frederick William. A houseboat, Manchester and Salford XXIX RNLI ON 841 at A. W. Marine, Canvey Island, July 2024.
841	Manchester and Salford XXIX	1943	1972–1974	Relief fleet	Sold August 1974; Renamed Maureen Mary, Paul David II, and Frederick William. A houseboat, Manchester and Salford XXIX RNLI ON 841 at A. W. Marine, Canvey Island, July 2024.
840	Millie Walton	1945	1945–1947	Cromer No.1	(Note: Legacy of Mrs Walton, built by the Sussex Yacht Co. of Shoreham, with internal rudder, and first to be fitted with midships cockpit, and internal rudder, costing £15,245.) Originally built for Douglas. Renamed after Henry Blogg, the most decorated RNLI lifeboatman, in 1947.
840	Henry Blogg	1945	1947–1966	Cromer No.1	Sold April 1977. Renamed Blogg of Cromer, but broken up in October 2016.
840	Henry Blogg	1945	1966–1976	Relief fleet	Sold April 1977. Renamed Blogg of Cromer, but broken up in October 2016.
846	Field Marshal and Mrs Smuts	1945	1945–1977	Beaumaris	(Note: Gift of the South Africa branch of the RNLI, built by Morgan Giles of Teignmouth, with internal rudder and mid-ship steering, costing £13,865.) Sold August 1979. Renamed Kenanda, later Llas-Sah-D, Broken up at Peel, Isle of Man, 13 August 2025.
846	Field Marshal and Mrs Smuts	1945	1977–1979	Relief fleet	Sold August 1979. Renamed Kenanda, later Llas-Sah-D, Broken up at Peel, Isle of Man, 13 August 2025.
847	Gertrude	1946	1946–1968	Holy Island	(Note: Legacy of Lady Struthers (née Gertrude Hill), built by Rowhedge Ironworks of Rowhedge, Essex, with internal rudder and stern cockpit, costing £17,048. Shelter added, 1968. Twin 65-bhp Parsons Ford Barracuda 6-cyl. diesel engines, 1966. Radar, 1973.) Sold February 1982. Unaltered at Mevagissey harbour, December 2025.
847	Gertrude	1946	1968–1970	Exmouth	Sold February 1982. Unaltered at Mevagissey harbour, December 2025.
847	Gertrude	1946	1970–1974	Sheerness	Sold February 1982. Unaltered at Mevagissey harbour, December 2025.
847	Gertrude	1946	1974–1980	Relief fleet	Sold February 1982. Unaltered at Mevagissey harbour, December 2025.
847	Gertrude	1946	1980–1981	Fowey	Sold February 1982. Unaltered at Mevagissey harbour, December 2025.
848	Millie Walton	1946	1946–1956	Douglas	(Note: Legacy of Mrs Walton, built by Groves and Guttridge of Cowes, with internal rudder and stern cockpit, costing £14,462.) Sold October 1977. Renamed Tyne Winder. Returned to be Millie Walton, but was broken up at Charlotte Quay, Grand Canal Basin, Dublin, July 2015.
848	Millie Walton	1946	1956–1974	Amble	Sold October 1977. Renamed Tyne Winder. Returned to be Millie Walton, but was broken up at Charlotte Quay, Grand Canal Basin, Dublin, July 2015.
848	Millie Walton	1946	1974–1977	Relief fleet	Sold October 1977. Renamed Tyne Winder. Returned to be Millie Walton, but was broken up at Charlotte Quay, Grand Canal Basin, Dublin, July 2015.

=== 46ft Watson-class (shallow draft) ===
ON	Name	Built	In service	Stations	Comments
805	Samuel and Marie Parkhouse	1938	1938–1962	Salcombe	(Note: Legacy of Mrs Parkhouse, built by J. Samuel White of Cowes, with internal rudder, and turtle-decks fore and aft, costing £8,450.) Sold September 1963. Renamed Oniros, at Titchmarsh Marina, Walton-on-the-Naze, December 2025.
815	Violet Armstrong	1938	1938–1962	Appledore	(Note: Gift of Mr Armstrong, built by J. Samuel White of Cowes, with internal rudder, and turtle-decks fore and aft, costing £8,600.) Sold October 1962. Under restoration at Albion Yard Marina, Bristol, April 2025.
820	Louise Stephens	1939	1939–1967	Great Yarmouth and Gorleston	(Note: Legacy of Mrs Stephens, built by J. Samuel White of Cowes, costing £9,351.) Sold August 1974. Renamed Mid Tyne Mariner, Tyne Star and Louise. Under restoration as Louise Stephens at Hewitt's boatyard, Stiffkey, Norfolk, December 2025.
820	Louise Stephens	1939	1967–1974	Eyemouth	Sold August 1974. Renamed Mid Tyne Mariner, Tyne Star and Louise. Under restoration as Louise Stephens at Hewitt's boatyard, Stiffkey, Norfolk, December 2025.
838	Michael Stephens	1939	1939–1963	Lowestoft	(Note: Legacy of Mrs L. Stephens, built by J. Samuel White of Cowes, costing £10,104.) Sold January 1976. Last reported in unaltered condition, on the River Yealm, Newton Ferrers, Devon, December 2023.
838	Michael Stephens	1939	1963–1968	Exmouth	Sold January 1976. Last reported in unaltered condition, on the River Yealm, Newton Ferrers, Devon, December 2023.
838	Michael Stephens	1939	1968–1976	Relief fleet	Sold January 1976. Last reported in unaltered condition, on the River Yealm, Newton Ferrers, Devon, December 2023.

== See also ==
- Watson-class lifeboat
- Royal National Lifeboat Institution lifeboats
