= Aran Islands Lifeboat Station =

RNLI lifeboat station in County Galway, Ireland

- Aran Islands Lifeboat Station in 2026

- Location within Ireland
- Former names: Galway Bay Lifeboat Station

General information
- Type: RNLI Lifeboat Station
- Location: The Harbour, Kilronan, Inishmore, Aran Islands, County Galway, Ireland
- Coordinates: 53°07′11.5″N 9°40′04.2″W
- Opened: 1927
- Owner: Royal National Lifeboat Institution

Website
- Aran Islands RNLI Lifeboat Station

Aran Islands Lifeboat Station is located in Kilronan, the largest settlement on the island of Inishmore, the largest of the three Aran Islands, which sit at the mouth of Galway Bay in County Galway, on the west coast of Ireland.

A lifeboat station was first established on Inishmore in 1927 by the Royal National Lifeboat Institution (RNLI), and named Galway Bay Lifeboat Station.

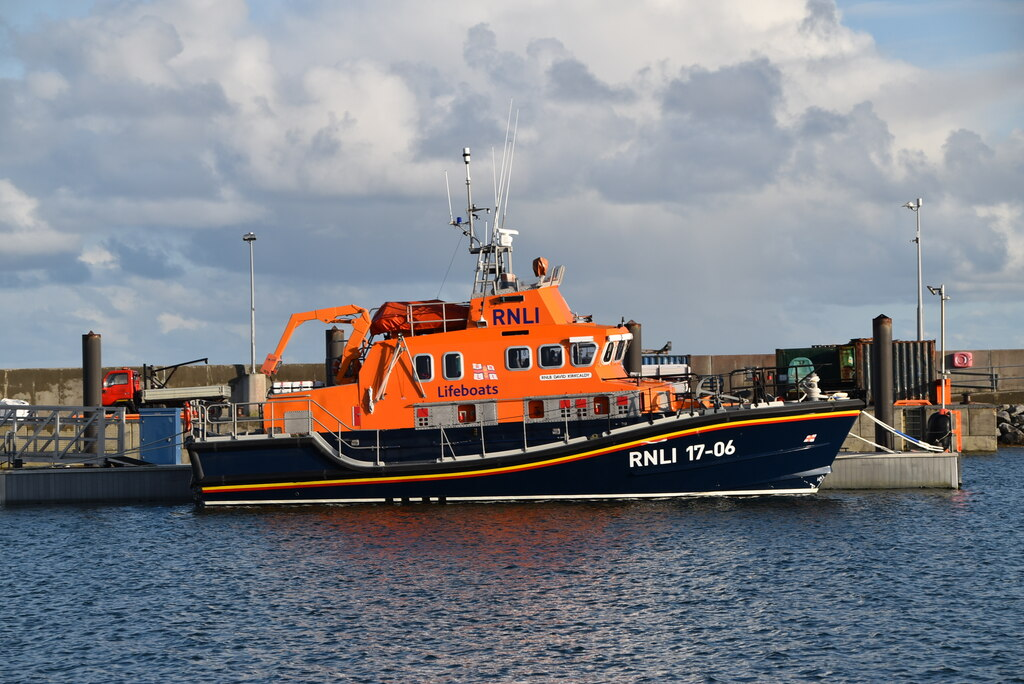
Aran Islands lifeboat 17-06 David Kirkaldy (ON 1217)

The station currently operates the Severn-class All-weather lifeboat 17-06 David Kirkaldy (ON 1217), on station since 1997.

== History ==
Ever since its founding in 1824, the Royal National Institution for the Preservation of Life from Shipwreck (RNIPLS), later to become the RNLI in 1854, would award medals for deeds of gallantry at sea, even if no lifeboats were involved. Between 1830, and 1851, three silver medals were awarded for services near the Aran Islands.

Following an appeal to the Institution from the Irish Department of Industry and Commerce, in 1926, it was decided to establish a new lifeboat station at Kilronan on the Aran Islands, at the entrance to Galway Bay, to be known as Galway Bay Lifeboat Station. A new lifeboat was scheduled for construction, but the station would initially receive the 45-foot Watson-class lifeboat William Evans (ON 653), previously stationed at Wexford, which arrived at Kilronan on 6 July 1927. The William Evans would actually remain on service for another 12 years.

Four bronze medals were awarded after a service to the motor vessel June, which ran aground on Mutton Island in a SW Force-7 gale on 16 January 1962. With considerable skill in poor conditions, eight men and a dog were rescued by the 46-foot Watson-class lifeboat Mabel Marion Thompson (ON 818). Five years later, "Framed Letters of Thanks signed by the Chairman of the Institution" were accorded to the nine crew of the Mabel Marion Thompson, for the rescue of eight men, and a dog, from the Greek motor vessel Razani of Pireaus on 25 October 1967.

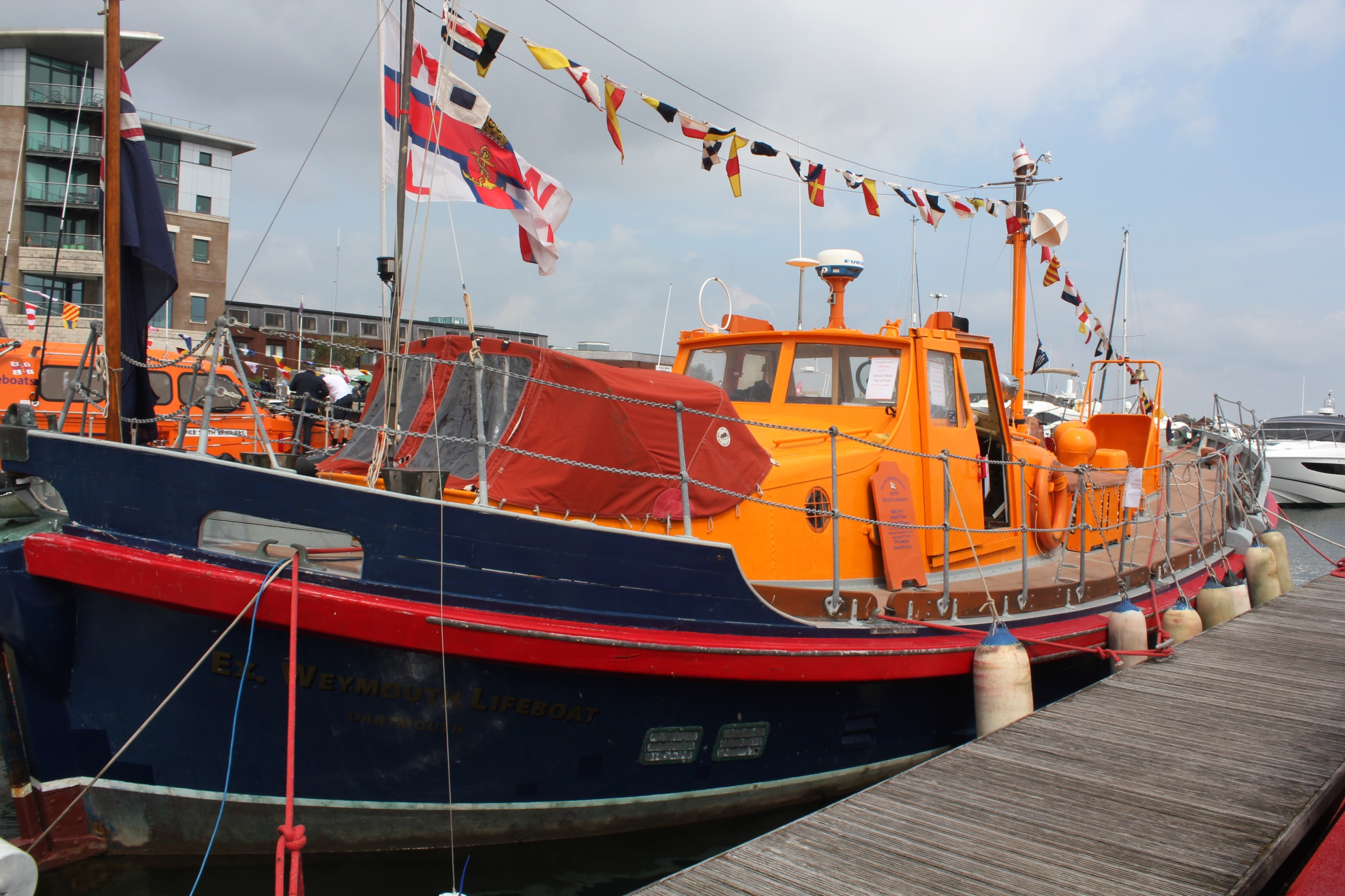
Former Aran Islands Lifeboat Frank Spiller Locke (ON 939)

In 1987, after a period of 60 years and six previous lifeboats, which had already seen service elsewhere, and including the 52-foot Barnett-class lifeboat Frank Spiller Locke (ON 939) (pictured), Galway Bay Lifeboat Station would finally received a brand new lifeboat, a 52 ft (16 m) Arun-class All-weather lifeboat.

At their first ever naming ceremony held on 11 June 1988, the lifeboat was named 52-36 Roy and Barbara Harding (ON 1118) by Mrs Barbara Harding, honorary secretary of the Seaton, Beer and district RNLI branch since 1940, and an honorary life governor of the RNLI since 1984. Capt. Roy Harding was a former lifeboat coxswain, and had been trials officer for the Arun-class lifeboats, before his death in 1985.

In 1990, the station facilities were much improved, when a derelict boathouse adjacent to the current boathouse was renovated and added to the station, the works being completed in October 1990.

Following a meeting of the executive committee on 29 March 1995, it was resolved that the name of Galway Bay Lifeboat Station would be changed to Aran Islands Lifeboat Station with effect from 1 August 1995.

In a three day period from the 3 October 2000, the Aran Islands Severn-class lifeboat 17-06 David Kirkaldy (ON 1217) spent over 30 hours at sea, searching for survivors of the Spanish Fishing trawler Arosa, which sank near Skerd Rocks, 10 miles (16 km) north-west of Inishmore. Just one man survived of the 13 crew. 'The Thanks of the Institution inscribed on Vellum' were accorded to Second Coxswain Patrick Mullen, in recognition of his dedication, leadership and skilful seamanship. Mechanic John Mulkerrin received 'A Framed Letter of Thanks signed by the Chairman of the Institution'.

== Notable Rescues ==
In 1938, with William Evans (ON 653) still on station, the fishing trawler Nogi ran aground on Straw Island on the night of 16 August. The bosun and one other man launched the ship's small boat, only for the bosun to be thrown out, and the boat set adrift with the other man. The bosun was hauled back aboard the Nogi. The sister fishing trawler Hatano, sitting 1.5 miles (2.4 km) away, radioed a distress call, which was picked up by the lifeboat coxswain, who launched the lifeboat within 20 minutes. Meanwhile, the Hatano had launched their small boat with four men aboard, who almost immediately were themselves in difficulties.

Arriving on scene, the lifeboat first had to rescue the four men in the small boat from the Hatano. The boats rowlock jammed into the lifeboat fender, and had to be cut away with an axe, before the boat was taken in tow. Heading back to the Nogi, five lifeboat men boarded the small boat, and veered down to the Nogi, rescuing the crew of 11 in two trips. All 15 men were put aboard the Hatano, whilst the lifeboat set about the search for the one remaining missing man. After putting back to harbour for refuelling, the search recommenced at daybreak, and after six hours, the man was found dazed and confused ashore near the Straw Island lighthouse, unable to remember anything after he had got in the boat. Seven of the lifeboat crew were awarded the RNLI Bronze Medal, with the remainder being accorded 'The Thanks of the Institution inscribed on Vellum'.

== Station honours ==
The following are awards made at Aran Islands:

- RNIPLS Silver Medal
  Lt. James Hector McKenzie Robertson, RN, H.M. Coastguard, Ballinacourty – 1837
  John Hein, Master of the Russian barque John – 1851
  Thomas Larkin, Mate of the Russian barque John – 1851
- RNLI Bronze Medal
  John Gill, Coxswain – 1938
  Joseph Doyle, Mechanic – 1938
  Patrick Flaherty, Bowman – 1938
  Joseph Flaherty, crew member – 1938
  Thomas Flaherty, crew member – 1938
  Peter Gill, crew member – 1938
  William Gorham, crew member – 1938
  Coleman Hernon, Coxswain – 1962
  Bartley Mullen, Assistant Mechanic – 1962
  Thomas Joyce, crew member – 1962
  Patrick Quinn, crew member – 1962
- The Thanks of the Institution inscribed on Vellum
  Michael Hernon, Second Coxswain – 1938
  Michael Dirrane, Asst. Motor Mechanic – 1938
  Colman Flaherty, crew member – 1938
  Thomas Beatty, crew member – 1938
  Bartley Mullin, Coxswain/Mechanic – 1987
  Padraic Dillane, Coxswain – 1990
  Seamus O'Flaherty, crew member – 1990
  Mairtan Fitzpatrick, crew member – 1990
  Patrick Mullen, Second Coxswain – 2001
- 'A Framed Letter of Thanks signed by the Chairman of the Institution'
  Coleman Hernon, Coxswain – 1967
  Thomas Flaherty, Second Coxswain – 1967
  Brian Fitzpatrick, Bowman – 1967
  Bartley Mullin, Mechanic – 1967
  Jack Gill, crew member – 1967
  Anthony O'Brien, crew member – 1967
  Malachy Beatty, crew member – 1967
  Thomas Joyce, crew member – 1967
  Patrick Mullin, crew member – 1967
  John Mulkerrin, Mechanic – 2001

== Aran Islands lifeboats ==
=== Motor lifeboats ===
| ON (Note: ON is the RNLI's Official Number of the boat.) | Op.No. (Note: Op.No. is the RNLI's Operational Number of the boat carried on the hull.) | Name | Built | On station | Class | Comments |
|---|---|---|---|---|---|---|
| 653 | – | William Evans | 1921 | 1927–1939 | 45-foot Watson | Previously at Wexford |
| 700 | – | K. E. C. F. | 1927 | 1939–1952 | 45-foot 6in Watson | Previously at Rosslare Harbour. |
| 818 | – | Mabel Marion Thompson | 1939 | 1952–1968 | 46-foot Watson | Previously at Rosslare Harbour. Transferred to Arranmore. |
| 898 | – | Joseph Hiram Chadwick | 1952 | 1968–1976 | 52-foot Barnett (Mk.I) | Previously at Padstow |
| 939 | – | Frank Spiller Locke | 1957 | 1977–1985 | 52-foot Barnett (Mk.II) | Previously at Weymouth. |
| 1011 | 48-008 | R Hope Roberts | 1969 | 1985–1987 | Solent | Previously at Rosslare Harbour and Fraserburgh. Transferred to the Relief fleet, later at Courtmacsherry Harbour. |
| 1118 | 52-36 | Roy and Barbara Harding | 1987 | 1987–1997 | Arun | Transferred to Castletownbere. |
| 1217 | 17-06 | David Kirkaldy | 1996 | 1997– | Severn | |

More post-service details can be found on the respective lifeboat class pages.

== See also ==
- List of RNLI stations
- List of former RNLI stations
- Royal National Lifeboat Institution lifeboats

== Sources ==
- Leonard, Richie; Denton, Tony (2026). Lifeboat Enthusiasts Handbook 2026. Lifeboats Enthusiasts' Society.
