= Wexford Lifeboat Station =

RNLI Lifeboat station in County Wexford, Ireland

- Flag of the RNLI

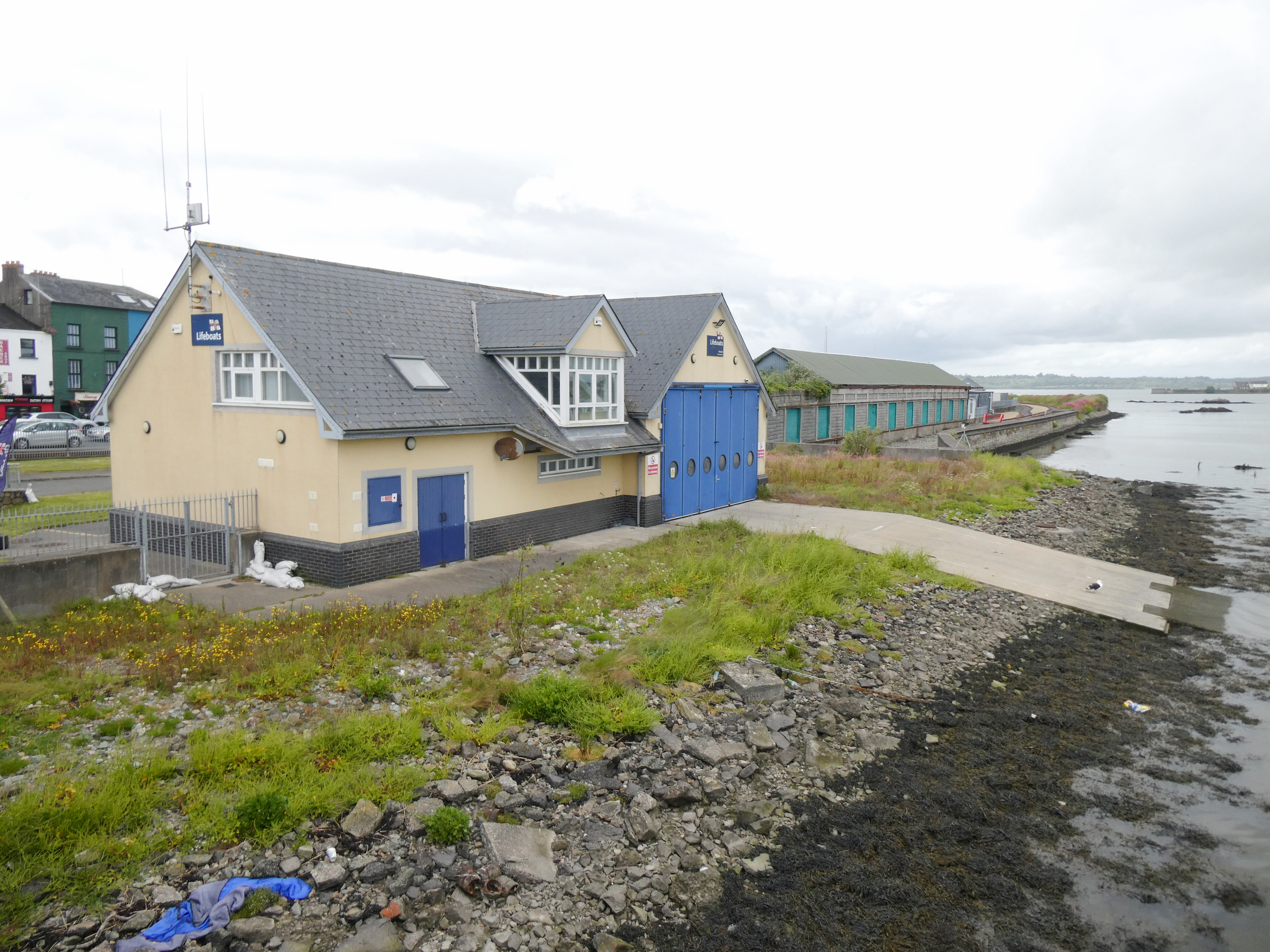
- Wexford lifeboat station in 2024

- Location within Ireland

General information
- Type: Lifeboat station
- Location: Wellington Place,, Townparks, Wexford, Y35 V635, Ireland
- Coordinates: 52.3418°N 6.4617°W
- Opened: First lifeboat 1838; Current station 2002
- Cost: £552,000
- Owner: Royal National Lifeboat Institution

Website
- Wexford RNLI Lifeboat Station

Wexford Lifeboat Station can be found at the western end of Wexford Bridge, in Wexford, the county town of County Wexford, which sits on the south side of Wexford Harbour and the estuary of the River Slaney, approximately 130 km (81 mi) south of Dublin, in the south eastern corner of Ireland.

A lifeboat station was first established in 1838 by the Royal National Lifeboat Institution (RNLI), but on the east side of Wexford harbour at Rosslare Point, and was known as Rosslare Fort Lifeboat Station. With a short closure between 1855 and 1858, lifeboats operated from Rosslare Point until 1925, with the station closing in 1927.

In 1998, the independent Wexford Harbour Inshore Rescue (WHIR) lifeboat, operating from Wexford Harbour Boat Club, was formally recognised. Management of the station was transferred to the RNLI in 2002.

The station currently operates a D-class (IB1) Inshore lifeboat, Cill Dara (D-916), on station since 2026.

== History ==
In 1826, following a request from Capt. J. Dombrain, Inspector of Coastguard at Dublin, a lifeboat was placed at Arklow by the Royal National Institution for the Preservation of Life from Shipwreck (RNIPLS) (later to become the RNLI). A 24-foot-long (7.3 m) lifeboat built by William Plenty of Newbury, Berkshire, costing £130, arrived at Arklow on 30 November 1826, and was the first lifeboat to be stationed in Ireland.

The boat was later transferred to Newcastle, then Skerries, and in 1838, with the help of a grant of £30 from the Corporation of Wexford, the lifeboat was placed at Rosslare Point, a spit of land on the east side of Wexford Harbour, establishing Rosslare Fort Lifeboat Station.

Just one year later, in 1839, the boat was condemned, having never been launched on service at any location. The boat was replaced with a slightly larger 26 ft 6 in (8.08 m) Palmer-class lifeboat, again funded by the RNIPLS, and a brick boathouse, 27 ft (8.2 m) long and 13 ft (4.0 m) wide, was also provided. The lifeboat operated from Rosslare Point until 1855, when this boat was also condemned. With no immediate replacement, the station closed.

At a meeting of the RNLI committee of management on Thursday 5 November 1857, it was resolved that a lifeboat be placed at Rosslare Point.

A lifeboat was ordered from Forrestt of Limehouse, London, but on 19 June 1858, the boatyard suffered a fire, which completely destroyed six newly built lifeboats, including the one scheduled for Rosslare Point. It would be the following November before a new 28 ft (8.5 m) 'Pulling and Sailing' (P&S) lifeboat, one with sails and six oars, was sent to the station, which from then was to be known as Wexford Lifeboat Station. The boat along with its carriage was transported free of charge from London to Wexford by the British and Irish Steam Packet Company.

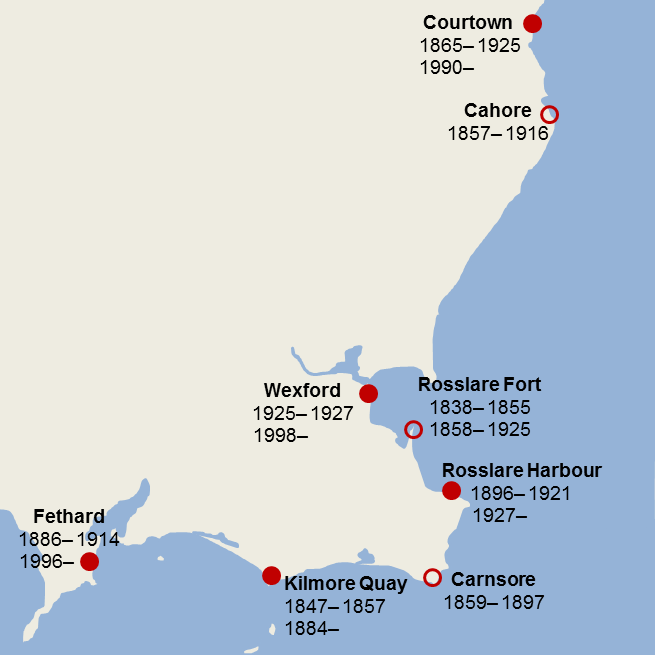
Map showing development of lifeboat stations around Wexford

Almost immediately, it was realised that the new lifeboat was too small. By the end of 1859, a second, larger 38 ft (12 m) Beeching lifeboat had arrived to be the Wexford lifeboat. Previously named Harriett at Southwold, it would initially be unnamed, and was kept moored afloat. In 1865, the Beeching lifeboat was named St Patrick.

The smaller 28 ft (8.5 m) lifeboat was retained, and from 1860 was known as the "Rosslare Fort" lifeboat. When the smaller lifeboat was replaced in 1866, by the 32 ft (9.8 m) Prowse-class lifeboat Civil Service, it would from then be known as the 'Wexford No. 2' lifeboat, with the larger 38-foot lifeboat being 'Wexford No. 1'.

Funded once again by the Civil Service lifeboat fund, the Wexford No.2 lifeboat was replaced in 1879 with a new 34 ft (10 m) lifeboat, Civil Service No. 1 (ON 301). To accommodate the larger boat, a new boathouse was built closer to the shore.

== Changes, storms and closure ==
In 1896, the new lifeboat station of Rosslare Harbour was established, when a large 42 ft (13 m) lifeboat Tom and Jenny (ON 271), previously at Beaumaris, was placed at the developing port of Rosslare Harbour. The following year, the Wexford No.2 station was closed, with the Civil Service No. 1 lifeboat transferred to Fethard.

Rosslare Point is a spit of land on the east of Wexford Harbour, attached to the mainland at its southern end. The lifeboat station was remote from any villages and so unusually had a paid crew (most RNLI crews are volunteers). They lived in cottages near the Coastguard's fort. It may be for this reason that when the 45-foot Watson-class motor-powered lifeboat William Evans (ON 653) was available in 1921, it was assigned to Wexford lifeboat station at Rosslare Point, rather than the newer station at Rosslare Harbour, which was closed as a result.

However, everything was soon to change again. Severe storms on 27 and 31 December 1924 made three breaches in the spit, one being 380 yd (350 m) wide. Another storm blew up on 11 January 1925 which lasted three days. On the morning of the 13 January 1925, the hurricane force wind and sea "destroyed huts, telegraph poles, and everything it touched like matchwood." A capstan and its concrete foundation was uprooted. The families were evacuated by lifeboat to Wexford for safety on 14 January, and the Rosslare Point station was permanently abandoned. It was decided to reopen Rosslare Harbour Lifeboat Station, but until it was ready, the Wexford lifeboat remained on service, operating from Wexford Quay.

One of the last services carried out by the Wexford motor lifeboat, on 7 November 1926, was unusually, a land based rescue. The signalman of the Pilot Station at Rosslare Point was rescued from his house, after it had been surrounded by the tide, and was in danger of collapsing. Wexford Lifeboat Station formally closed in 1927, with the lifeboat being transferred to Galway Bay.

== 1995 onwards ==
In 1995, a number of drownings on the River Slaney estuary and in Wexford Harbour resulted in a committee being formed, with the aim of forming a community rescue service. This was the start of Wexford Harbour Inshore Rescue (WHIR), which operated from refurbished shipping containers at the Wexford Harbour Boat Club. After training was received from the Water Safety Council and Department of the Marine, WHIR became a 'Declared Facility' for the Irish Coast Guard in November 1998.

On 11 April 2002, management of the station was formally transferred to the RNLI, and the D-class (EA16) Inshore lifeboat Winifred & Cyril Thorpe (D-469) was placed on station from the relief fleet. Following a donation from the Booth family, Wexford were finally allocated a permanent lifeboat, Phillip Robert Booth (D-644), in 2005.

A local fundraising campaign was also started in 2005, and with another substantial donation from the Booth family, over £100,000 was raised. After having continued to operate for five years from a portacabin and the containers at Wexford Harbour Boat Club, a new station was constructed at Wexford Quay, being completed in November 2007, at a cost of £552,000. The boathouse was formally opened at a ceremony in June 2008.

== Area of operation ==
The Inshore lifeboat at Wexford has a range of 3 hours and top speed of 25 kn (46 km/h). Adjacent lifeboats are an All-weather Severn-class lifeboat at Rosslare Harbour to the south, and another D-class (IB1) Inshore lifeboat at Courtown to the north.

== Service awards ==
Lifeboat coxswain Marcus Boyle was awarded the RNLI Silver Medal, for leading the rescue of four men, eight women and six children from the Montagu, which ran aground in a storm in 1878. Thomas Wickham became the coxswain in 1884 and also won a silver medal, for saving people from the Annie in 1896. He was followed by Edward Wickham, appointed coxswain in 1899. He too received a silver medal following a service to the Puffin in 1906, followed by a second award silver clasp, for his part in the Mexico rescue.

=== The Mexico ===
The Norwegian schooner Mexico was wrecked in a storm on 20 February 1914. The Fethard lifeboat was launched but capsized, with the loss of nine of its 14 crew. The five survivors managed to reach South Keeragh Island and bring the schooner's crew across to them. The Wexford and Dunmore East lifeboats managed to rescue the two crews from the island three days later. The Wexford crew used a skiff to reach the island. It was holed when it struck rocks but the lifeboat crew wrapped a loaf of bread in oilskins and blocked the hole so that the rescue could be completed. James Wickham and William Duggan were both awarded silver medals by the RNLI, along with silver medals from The King of Norway. Both men were awarded a specially struck All Ireland gold medal from the Gaelic Athletic Association, an award never made before, or since. Lifeboat Chief Inspector Holmes came from London to oversee the rescue operation and also received a silver medal.

=== Station honours ===
The following are awards made at Wexford / Rosslare Fort:

- All-Ireland Gold Medal, awarded by the Gaelic Athletic Association
  William Duggan, crew member – 1914
  James Wickham, crew member – 1914
- RNIPLS Silver Medal
  Richard Ross, Chief Boatman, H.M. Coastguard – 1825
  Thomas Bates, Chief Officer of H.M. Coastguard, Wexford – 1839
  Patrick Carberry, Masteer Mariner – 1844
  Phillip Mitten, Master of the boat Zephyr – 1849
  Thomas Rossiter, Master of the boat Steamer – 1849
  Capt. William Toole, 40th Regiment of Foot – 1849
- RNLI Silver Medal
  Mark Devereux, Master Pilot – 1865 (Third-Service clasp)
  Henry Carr, H.M Customs Officer – 1877
  Marcus Boyle, Coxswain – 1878
  Marcus Boyle, Coxswain – 1884 (Second-Service clasp)
  Thomas Wickham, Coxswain – 1896
  Edward Wickham, Coxswain – 1906
  Edward Wickham, Coxswain – 1914 (Second-Service clasp)
  William Duggan, crew member – 1914
  James Wickham, crew member – 1914
- Silver Medal, awarded by The King of Norway
  William Duggan, crew member – 1914
  James Wickham, crew member – 1914
- 'The Thanks of the Institution inscribed on Vellum'
  Captain of the Wexford Tug Boat – 1914

== Wexford and Rosslare Fort lifeboats ==
=== Pulling and Sailing (P&S) lifeboats ===
==== Rosslare Fort (1838–1855) ====
On station	ON (Note: ON is the RNLI's Official Number of the boat.)	Name	Built	Class	Comments
1838–1839	Pre-123	Unnamed	1826	24-foot Plenty	(Note: 24 ft 0 in (7.32 m) x 8 ft 0 in (2.44 m) (8-oared) Plenty-class lifeboat, funded by the RNIPLS, built by William Plenty of Newbury, Berkshire, costing £130 when new.); Previously at Arklow, Newcastle and Skerries. Condemned and sold in October 1839.
1839–1855	Pre-187	Unnamed	1839	26-foot 6in Palmer	(Note: 26 ft 6 in (8.08 m) x 6 ft 4 in (1.93 m) (5-oared) Palmer-class non-self-righting lifeboat, funded by the RNIPLS, built by Taylor of Blackwall, London, costing £70.); Broken up in 1855.

Pre ON numbers are unofficial numbers used by the Lifeboat Enthusiasts' Society to reference early lifeboats not included on the official RNLI list.

==== Wexford / Wexford No. 1 (1859–1921) ====
On station	ON	Name	Built	Class	Comments
1858–1860	Pre-330	Unnamed	1858	28-foot Peake self-righting (P&S)	(Note: 28 ft 0 in (8.53 m) x 6 ft 0 in (1.83 m) (5-oared) Peake-class self-righting (P&S) lifeboat, funded by the RNLI, built by Forrestt of Limehouse, London, costing £131.); Transferred to Wexford No. 2.
1859–1865	Pre-246	Unnamed	1852	38-foot Beeching self-righting (P&S)	(Note: 38 ft 0 in (11.58 m) x 10 ft 0 in (3.05 m) (12-oared) Beeching-class self-righting (P&S) lifeboat, gift of Miss Sheriffe and Sir Edward Gooch, built by James Beeching of Great Yarmouth, costing £280. Later modified to Peake's plan.); Previously Harriett at Southwold and Great Yarmouth and Gorleston. Renamed St Patrick in 1865.
1865–1871	Pre-246	St Patrick	1852	38-foot Beeching self-righting (P&S)	Sold in 1871.
1871–1890	Pre-563	Ethel Eveleen	1871	40-foot self-righting (P&S)	(Note: 40 ft 0 in (12.19 m) x 10 ft 7 in (3.23 m) (12-oared) self-righting (P&S) lifeboat, gift of Mr J. M. Smith of London, built by Forrestt of Limehouse, London, costing £472.); Sold in 1891
1890–1898	274	Andrew Pickard	1890	42-foot self-righting (P&S)	(Note: 42 ft 0 in (12.80 m) x 11 ft 0 in (3.35 m) (12-oared) self-righting (P&S) lifeboat, legacy of Mr A. Pickard of Leeds, built by Forrestt of Limehouse, London, costing £647.); Sold in 1898.
1898–1900	296	Reserve No. 4	1890	37-foot self-righting (P&S)	(Note: 37 ft 0 in (11.28 m) x 8 ft 0 in (2.44 m) (12-oared) self-righting (P&S) lifeboat, gift of Lady Erle of Liphook, built by Watkins of Blackwall, London, costing £533.); Previously William Erle at Swanage. Returned to the Relief fleet, later at Burry Port.
1900–1921	442	James Stevens No. 15	1900	40-foot Watson (P&S)	(Note: 40 ft 0 in (12.19 m) x 10 ft 0 in (3.05 m) (12-oared) Watson-class non-self-righting (P&S) lifeboat, legacy of Mr James Stevens of Birmingham, built by Thames Ironworks of Blackwall, London, costing £1295.); Sold in 1921 for private use at Rosslare Point.

==== Rosslare Fort / Wexford No. 2 (1860–1897) ====
On station	ON	Name	Built	Class	Comments
1860–1866	Pre-330	Unnamed	1858	28-foot Peake self-righting (P&S)	Previously Wexford No.1. Sold in 1866.
1866–1879	Pre-464	Civil Service	1866	32-foot Prowse self-righting (P&S)	(Note: 32 ft 0 in (9.75 m) x 7 ft 6 in (2.29 m) (10-oared) Prowse-class self-righting (P&S) lifeboat, gift of the Civil Service LB fund, built by Forrestt of Limehouse, London, costing £242.); Transferred to Whitby and renamed Harriott Forteath.
1879–1897	301	Civil Service No. 1	1878	34-foot self-righting (P&S)	(Note: 34 ft 0 in (10.36 m) x 8 ft 3 in (2.51 m) (10-oared) self-righting (P&S) lifeboat, gift of the Civil Service LB fund, built by Woolfe of Shadwell, London, costing £363.); Transferred to Fethard in 1897, and renamed Helen Blake.

=== Motor lifeboats (1921–1927) ===
On station	ON	Name	Built	Class	Comments
1921–1927	653	William Evans	1921	45-foot Watson	Stationed at Wexford Quay from 1925, when the station at Rosslare Fort had to be closed. Transferred to Galway Bay.

Station closed in 1927.
More post-service details can be found on the respective lifeboat class pages.

=== Inshore lifeboats ===
==== D class ====
On Station	Op.No. (Note: Op. No. is the RNLI's Operational Number of the boat carried on the hull.)	Name	Class	Comments
2002	D-469	Winifred & Cyril Thorpe	D-class (EA16)	First deployed in the Relief Fleet in 1994.
2002–2004	D-426	Lord Feoffees II	D-class (EA16)	First stationed at Bridlington in 1992.
2004–2005	D-447	Thomas Campbell	D-class (EA16)	First stationed at Amble in 1993.
2005–2015	D-644	Phillip Robert Booth	D-class (IB1)	
2015–2026	D-782	Alfred William Newman	D-class (IB1)	
2026–	D-916	Cill Dara	D-class (IB1)	

== See also ==
- List of RNLI stations
- List of former RNLI stations
- Royal National Lifeboat Institution lifeboats
