= Buckie Lifeboat Station =

RNLI lifeboat station in Moray, Scotland

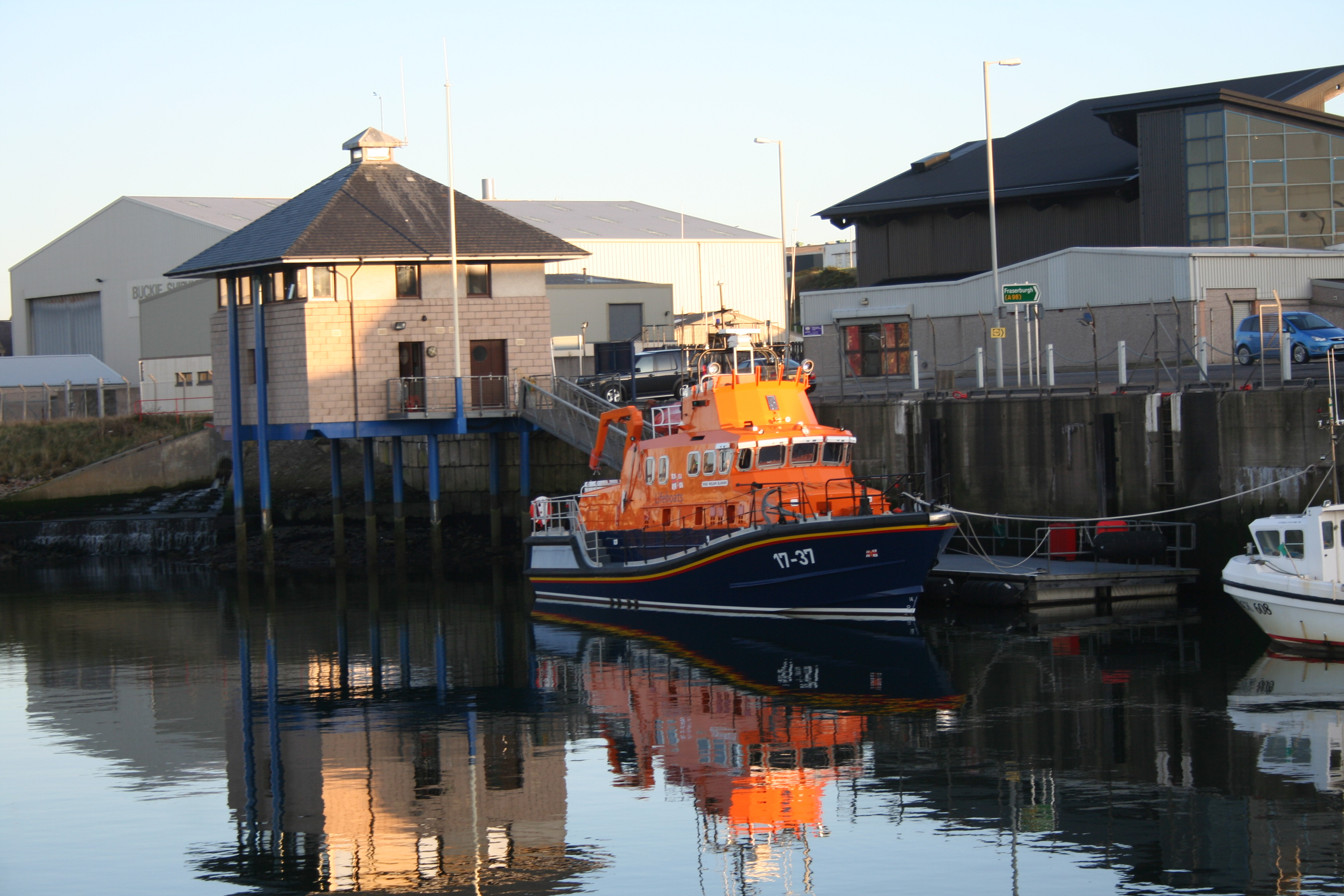
- Buckie Lifeboat Station

- Location within Scotland

General information
- Type: RNLI Lifeboat Station
- Location: Commercial Road, Buckie, Moray, AB56 1TX, Scotland
- Coordinates: 57°40′51.0″N 2°57′10.0″W
- Opened: 1860
- Owner: Royal National Lifeboat Institution

Website
- Buckie RNLI Lifeboat Station

Buckie Lifeboat Station can be found on Commercial Road in Buckie, a harbour town on the south shore of the Moray Firth, approximately 5 miles (8.0 km) east of the mouth of the River Spey, in the administrative region of Moray, historically Banffshire, on the coast of NE Scotland.

A lifeboat was first stationed at Buckie by the Royal National Lifeboat Institution (RNLI) in 1860.

The station currently operates 17-37 William Blannin (ON 1268), a Severn-class All-weather lifeboat, on station since 2003.

== History ==
A request in February 1860 from Commander McDonald, Inspector of H.M. Coastguard, that a lifeboat be placed at Buckie, was considered and accepted by the RNLI Committee of Management, and was formally agreed on 5 April 1860. An order for a lifeboat was placed with Forrestt of Limehouse, London, who constructed a 30 ft (9.1 m) Peake-class 6-oared self-righting 'Pulling and Sailing' (P&S) lifeboat, one with sails and (6) oars. The lifeboat, which was named Miriam, arrived by rail on 10 November 1860.

A boathouse was commissioned, costing £140-9s. The site of the boathouse is thought to have been on the west shore of Buckie Burn, now near Union Terrace, where the Great North of Scotland Railway bridge was later constructed.

Miriam was only launched three times on service, but she is also recorded to have saved 49 lives over those three occasions. She was converted to be a 10-oared boat in 1866, but by 1870, the RNLI had decided to replace her with a larger 33 ft (10 m) lifeboat.

A new boat was ordered, again from Forrestt of London, at a cost of £277-17s-6d. It was transported free of charge by the North Eastern, Caledonian and Great North of Scotland railway companies. The boat arrived in Portsoy on 25 January 1871, from where it was pulled on a carriage by a team of horses 10 miles (16 km) to Buckie, to be greeted by 3,000 people. Two bands joined the procession down to the boathouse, where the boat was named James Sturm, to recognise the legacy of Mr. James Sturm of Holborn.

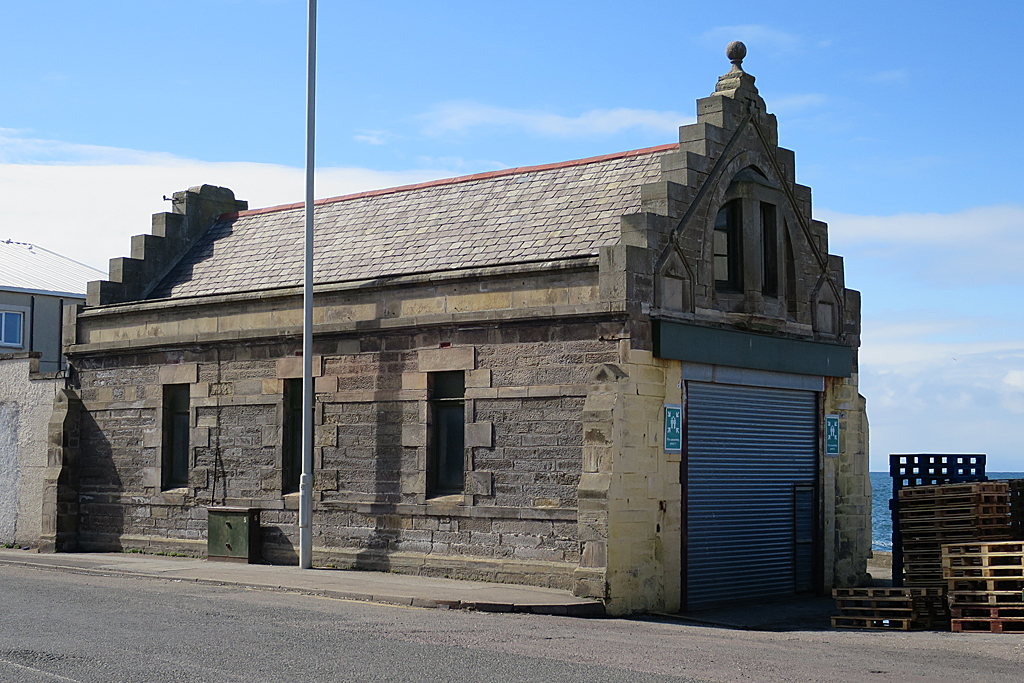
1895 Boathouse, Low Street, Buckie

As part of the ongoing redevelopment of Buckie harbour, the RNLI were contacted by the Great North of Scotland railway company in 1883, who wished to extend their lines, and needed the land where the 1860 boathouse stood. A deal was struck, and the boathouse and land were sold for just over £121. A new boathouse (pictured) was constructed on Low Street in 1885, costing £447-19s-0d, but it is not known if this was paid for by the RNLI, or was funded by the railway company.

Buckie received their first powered lifeboat in 1922, a 40ft Watson-class non-self-righting lifeboat, with a single 45-hp engine, giving a speed of 7.36 knots (13.63 km/h; 8.47 mph). She was named K. B. M. (ON 81) in recognition of her late benefactors, Mr. William Kirkhope, Mr Charles Bailey, and Miss Charlotte McInroy. This boat required the construction of a new boathouse, and it was one of only two built of this design, the other one being at Sunderland. With insufficient room for a conventional slipway, the boathouse was built over the water, on the west pier, and utilised an internal boat platform, which could be lowered down to the water underneath.

The 1922 boathouse was used until 1984, when Buckie received an Arun-class lifeboat, 52-27 Charles Brown (ON 1093), which was moored afloat. Further works were carried out to create new crew facilities in 1995, and a pontoon berth was constructed, which is now home to Severn-class lifeboat, 17-37 William Blannin (ON 1268).

In 2018, the recently restored 47-foot Watson-class lifeboat Laura Moncur (ON 958) made a return trip to her old station, 34 years after she last departed, and received an emotional reception from her former crew members.

== Notable rescues ==
In the very early hours of 21 February 1968, relief lifeboat George and Sarah Strachan (ON 749) was launched to the aid of fishing boat Mistletoe, aground at the mouth of the River Spey. The boat was found close to the beach, in heavy swell and pounding waves. Working in dark and freezing conditions, attempts to get a tow-line in place failed, so Coxswain Jappy skillfully brought the lifeboat alongside, and all six crew were rescued. They were given rum and hot drinks, and landed in Buckie just before 05:00. For this service, Coxswain George Alexander Jappy was awarded the RNLI Bronze Medal, with the crew being awarded Medal Service Certificates.

== Station honours ==
The following are awards made at Buckie:

- RNLI Silver Medal
  Peter Fernie, Fisherman – 1890
  William Raich, Fisherman – 1890
- RNLI Bronze Medal
  George Alexander Jappy, Coxswain – 1968
- Medal Service Certificates
  Buckie Lifeboat Crew – 1968
- 'The Thanks of the Institution inscribed on Vellum'
  James Gale, Coxswain – 1868
  Francis Mair, Coxswain – 1942
  George Jappy, Coxswain – 1967
- 'A Framed Letter of Thanks signed by the Chairman of the Institution'
  John Murray, Coxswain – 1987
  Kenneth Farquhar, Acting Second Coxswain – 1987
  George Stewart, Motor Mechanic – 1987
  Philip Latchem, crew member – 1987
  Gordon Lawtie, crew member – 1987
  Steven Matheson, crew member – 1987
  John Murray, Coxswain – 1991
- Plaque of Merit, awarded by the Swedish Lifeboat Society
  Royal National Lifeboat Institution – 1949
- A Diploma, awarded by the Swedish Lifeboat Society
  Buckie Lifeboat Station – 1949
- British Empire Medal
  John Cole, Motor Mechanic – 1974NYH

== Buckie lifeboats ==
=== Pulling and Sailing (P&S) lifeboats ===
ON (Note: ON is the RNLI's Official Number of the boat.)	Name	Built	On station	Class	Comments
Pre-369	Miriam	1860	1860−1871	30-foot Peake self-righting (P&S)	(Note: 30 ft 0 in (9.14 m) x 7 ft 0 in (2.13 m) (6-oared) Peake-class self-righting (P&S) lifeboat, gift of an anonymous Lady, built by Forrestt of Limehouse, London, costing £156. Altered to 10-oared in 1866.); Broken up in 1871.
Pre-546	James Sturm	1870	1871−1889	33-foot Peake self-righting (P&S)	(Note: 33 ft 0 in (10.06 m) x 8 ft 1 in (2.46 m) (10-oared) Peake-class self-righting (P&S) lifeboat, legacy of Mr J. Sturm of Holborn, built by Forrestt of Limehouse, London, costing £278.); Sold in 1889.
244	James Sharpe	1889	1889−1908	34-foot self-righting (P&S)	(Note: 34 ft 0 in (10.36 m) x 7 ft 6 in (2.29 m) (10-oared) self-righting (P&S) lifeboat, legacy of Mr J. Sharpe of Shoreditch, built by D. and W. Henderson and Company of Partick, costing £441.); Sold in 1908.
581	Maria Stephenson	1907	1908−1922	38-foot Watson (P&S)	(Note: 38 ft 0 in (11.58 m) x 9 ft 4 in (2.84 m) (12-oared) Watson-class non-self-righting lifeboat, legacy of Miss M. M. Stephenson of Chelsea, built by Thames Ironworks, costing £1,121.); Transferred to the Relief fleet. Later at Moelfre.

Pre ON numbers are unofficial numbers used by the Lifeboat Enthusiasts' Society to reference early lifeboats not included on the official RNLI list.

=== Motor lifeboats ===
ON	Op.No. (Note: Op.No. is the RNLI's Operational Number of the boat carried on the hull.)	Name	Built	On station	Class	Comments
681	−	K. B. M.	1922	1922−1949	40-foot Watson	Transferred to the Relief fleet.
857	−	Glencoe-Glasgow	1949	1949−1960	41-foot Watson	Transferred to Girvan.
736	−	W & S	1930	1960−1961	45-foot 6in Watson	Previously at Penlee. Transferred to the Relief fleet.
958	−	Laura Moncur	1961	1961−1972	47-foot Watson	Sent for self-righting conversion in 1972.
940	−	Pentland (Civil Service No.31)	1957	1972−1974	47-foot Watson	Lifeboat from the Relief fleet.
958	−	Laura Moncur	1961	1975−1984	47-foot Watson	Transferred to the Relief fleet.
1093	52-27	Charles Brown	1984	1984−2003	Arun	
1268	17-37	William Blannin	2003	2003−	Severn	

More post-service details can be found on the respective lifeboat class pages.

== See also ==
- List of RNLI stations
- List of former RNLI stations
- Royal National Lifeboat Institution lifeboats
