= Mullion Lifeboat Station =

Former RNLI lifeboat station in Cornwall, England

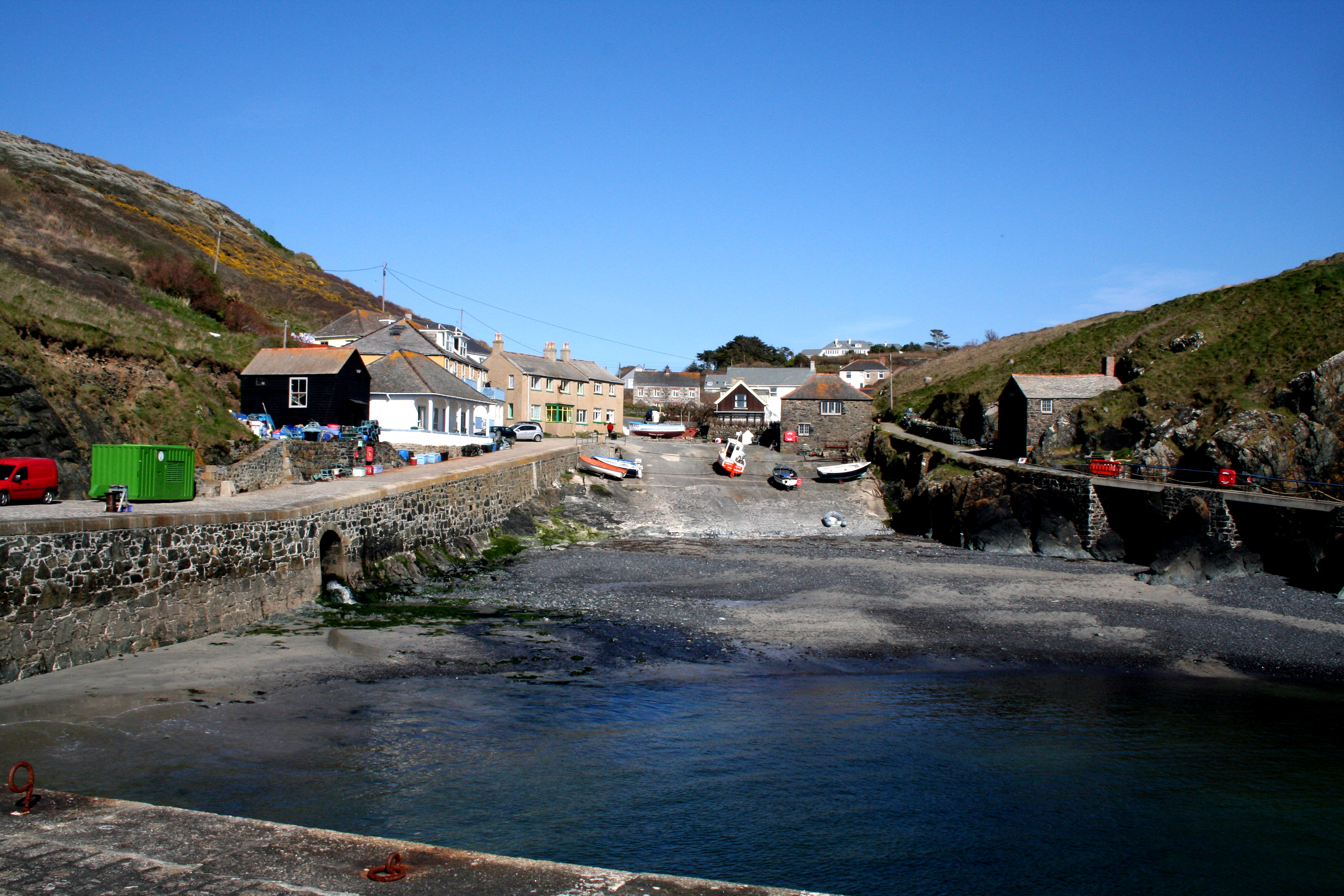
- Mullion Cove.

- Mullion Cove, Cornwall

General information
- Status: Closed
- Type: RNLI Lifeboat Station
- Location: Nansmellyon Road, Mullion Cove, Mullion, Cornwall, TR12 7ET, England
- Coordinates: 50°00′55.2″N 5°15′25.5″W
- Opened: 1867
- Closed: 1908

Mullion Lifeboat Station was located at the harbour and hamlet of Mullion Cove (Cornish: Porth Melin), part of the village of Mullion, which sits on the west coast of the Lizard Peninsula, overlooking the eastern side of Mount's Bay, approximately 8 miles (13 km) south of the town of Helston, in Cornwall.

A lifeboat station was established at Mullion by the Royal National Lifeboat Institution (RNLI) in 1867.

After 41 years of operation, Mullion Lifeboat Station closed in 1908.

== History ==
Since its founding in 1824, the Royal National Institution for the Preservation of Life from Shipwreck (RNIPLS), later to become the RNLI in 1854, would award medals for deeds of gallantry at sea, even if no lifeboats were involved.

In a hurricane on 27 April 1824, the brig Olive of Tenby was driven ashore under a cliff at Halzephron, near Gunwalloe, just north of Mullion Cove, whilst on passage to Littlehampton. Two men went to the aid of the vessel, and after getting a rope aboard, eight people including one woman were rescued. William Rowe and James Freeman were the first two recipients of the new RNIPLS Silver Medal.

On 5 January 1867, the schooner Margaret foundered off the Lizard Peninsula, with the loss of all four crew. The following day, two schooners collided off Mullion. The crew of the Ebbw Vale, on passage from Liverpool to Caen, France, were rescued by the smack Hearty of Jersey, but the crew of the Cherub, also on passage to Caen, were not so fortunate. The vessel was beached, but ultimately with the loss of all hands.

Representations were made to the RNLI for the provision of a lifeboat. At a meeting of the RNLI committee of management on Thurday 7 February 1867, it was decided to establish a new station at Mullion Cove.

As if to reinforce the requirement for a lifeboat, just 6 weeks later, on 25 March 1867, before the lifeboat arrived on station, the Dutch Eastindiaman barque Jonkheer Meester van de Wall van Putterschoek, on passage to Rotterdam, was wrecked off the Men-y-Grib rocks south of Poldhu, when it was driven ashore during a storm. A Greek sailor, Georgio Buffani, was the sole survivor of the 19 crew and 7 passengers.

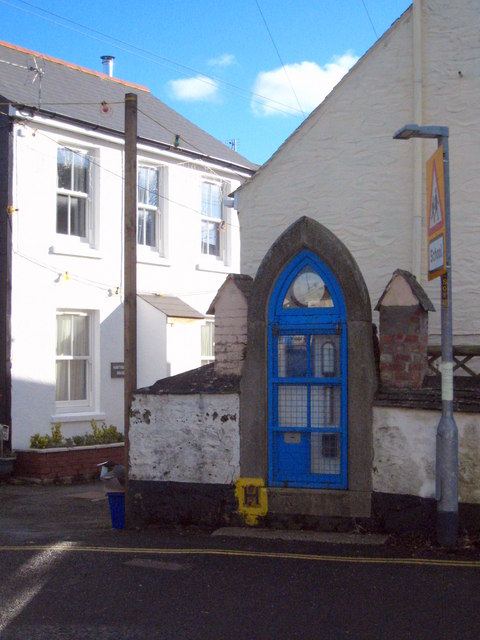
Clock and 1867 RNLI Barometer in Mullion

A boathouse, costing £183-4s, was constructed on a site provided by T. J. Agar-Robartes, MP for East Cornwall. A 33-foot self righting 'Pulling and Sailing' (P&S) lifeboat, one with sails and (10) oars, was dispatched to the station, transported free of charge by the Bristol and Exeter, South Devon, Cornwall, and West Cornwall Railway Companies, calling first at Penzance.

The cost of the Mullion lifeboat station establishment had been defrayed from a fund raised by the Wesleyan Methodists, via their Methodist Recorder publication, in memory of the late Rev. Daniel James Draper, who had been lost when the SS London was wrecked in the Bay of Biscay on 11 January 1866, whilst on passage from Gravesend to Melbourne. On 10 September 1867, a grand procession and celebration took place, the day coinciding with a public holiday in Penzance, for the inauguration of the New Public Buildings. The boat was drawn through the town to the beach, where the mayoress named the lifeboat Daniel J. Draper, before it was launched, and then joined by the lifeboats from Sennen Cove, Porthleven and Hayle.

The timing of the placement of the lifeboat was fortuitous. Just eleven days later, on 21 October 1867, the lifeboat successfully rescued three of the crew of the barque Achilles, which had stranded on Polurrian Beach in fog, the remaining crew being rescued by the Rocket Brigade.

The station would also receive a new Negretti and Zambra barometer in 1867, which was to be made visible to the local seafarers. The basic principle was that of prevention rather than cure. If the locals knew the weather was about to turn, then they would be less inclined to set sail, and therefore not need rescuing. The Barometer is still visible in the village.

A poem in memory of Rev. Draper and for the Daniel J. Draper lifeboat, was published in "The Lifeboat" journal of 1 January 1869:–

"He died at his post as a man should die, That Christian true and brave,
Leading the way to the realms on high, Through the jaws of an ocean-grave!

He served one Master, and that dear Lord, Was with him that awful day,
When the London founder'd with all on board. In Biscay's fatal bay!

The wind howl'd wildly, the fierce waves fought, And shriek'd through the blacken'd air,
But the only sound that was heavenward brought, Was the holy voice of prayer.

They sank together, the young and the old, They rose together to bliss,—
For the Saviour gather'd them safe to His fold, From the depths of that dark abyss.

And he, the leader of that brave band, Is his name remember'd no more?
No; the Draper life-boat, by heroes mann'd, Guards Mullion's rock-bound shore !

O crew of the life-boat, gallant and brave, As you launch her into the sea,
And risk your own lives your comrades to save, Think " the Lord has need of me."

You are working for Him in your spheres below, And He blesses you from above,
Guiding you safely as forward you go, On your mission of Christian love."

Mary Frances Tupper, Albury House, November 3, 1868

Two further lifeboats would come to serve at Mullion. In 1887, the Daniel J. Draper was replaced with a larger 37-foot 12-oared lifeboat. The boat was funded by an anonymous lady from London, and was named Edith (ON 106).

Funded by the bequest of the late Mr E. A. Newbon of Islington, a 38-foot lifeboat Nancy Newbon (ON 365) was placed on service in 1894. The estate would fund an additional four new lifeboats, Ann Newbon (ON 357) at Sennen Cove, Lucy Newbon (ON 360) at Selsey, Betsy Newbon (ON 361) at Torbay and Bob Newbon (ON 372) at Falmouth.

Mullion Lifeboat Station was closed in 1908. The lifeboat was launched a total of just 14 times in a period of 41 years, and completed just one effective service, saving 3 men in the rescue carried out just eleven days after opening in 1867. The boathouse still stands, and is now a private residence. The last lifeboat on station, Nancy Newbon (ON 365), was transferred to Sunderland, where she would serve for another four years.

== Station honours ==
The following are awards made at Mullion.

- RNIPLS Silver Medal

William Rowe, seaman – 1824
James Freeman, seaman – 1824

== Mullion lifeboats ==
=== Pulling and Sailing (P&S) lifeboats ===
ON (Note: ON is the RNLI's Official Number of the boat.)	Name	Built	On station	Class	Comments
Pre-489	Daniel J. Draper	1867	1867−1887	33-foot Peake Self-Righting (P&S)	(Note: 33-foot x 8-foot 7in (10-oared) Peake-class self-righting (P&S) lifeboat, gift of the 'Methodist Recorder' LB fund, built by Forrestt of Limehouse, London, costing £283.)
106	Edith	1870	1887−1894	37-foot Self-Righting (P&S)	(Note: 37-foot x 8-foot (12-oared) self-righting (P&S) lifeboat, legacy of Lady Emile Windham-Quinn, built by Forrestt of Limehouse, London, costing £454.)
365	Nancy Newbon	1894	1894−1908	38-foot Self-Righting (P&S)	(Note: 38-foot x 8-foot (12-oared) self-righting (P&S) lifeboat, legacy of Mr R. A. Newbon of Islington, built by Forrestt of Limehouse, London, costing £545.)

Pre ON numbers are unofficial numbers used by the Lifeboat Enthusiast Society to reference early lifeboats not included on the official RNLI list.

== See also ==
- List of RNLI stations
- List of former RNLI stations
- Royal National Lifeboat Institution lifeboats
