= Thurso Lifeboat Station =

RNLI lifeboat station in Caithness, Scotland

- Thurso Lifeboat Station

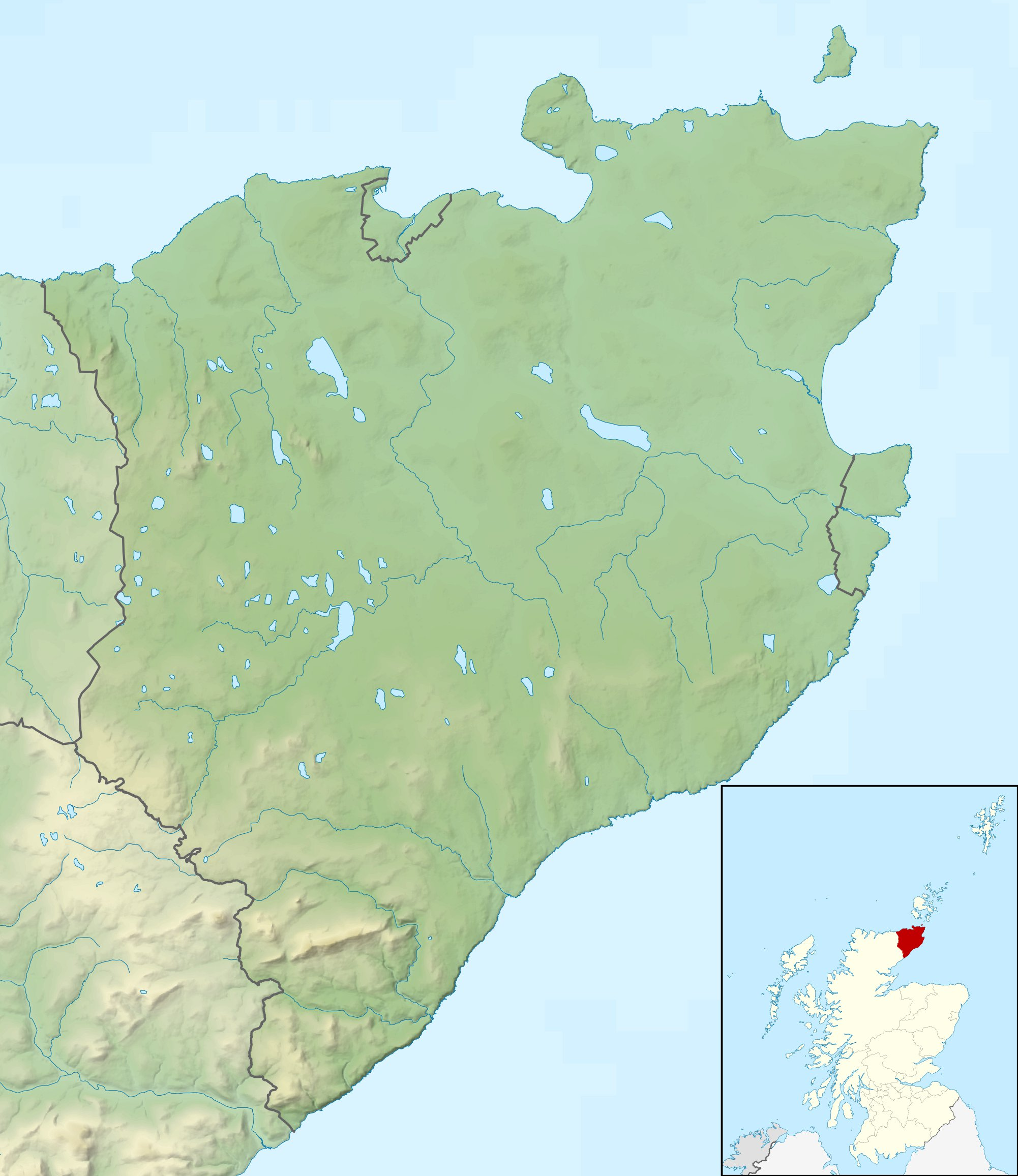
- Location within Caithness

General information
- Type: RNLI Lifeboat Station
- Location: Scrabster Harbour, Ferry Pier, Scrabster, Thurso, Caithness, KW14 7UJ, Scotland
- Coordinates: 58°36′43.4″N 3°32′49.2″W
- Opened: 1860
- Owner: Royal National Lifeboat Institution

Website
- Thurso RNLI Lifeboat Station

Thurso Lifeboat Station is located at Scrabster Harbour, near the town of Thurso, in the administrative area of Highland, historically Caithness, on the north coast of mainland Scotland.

A lifeboat was first stationed at Thurso by the Royal National Lifeboat Institution (RNLI) in 1860.

The station currently operates a Severn-class All-weather lifeboat, 17-42 The Taylors (ON 1273), on station since 2004.

== History ==
Between 1830 and 1856, the Royal National Institution for the Preservation of Life from Shipwreck (RNIPLS), later the RNLI, had awarded no less than six silver medals for Gallantry to Coastguard, Fishermen and other locals, for rescues performed around Thurso.

In 1859, it was decided to establish a station in Thurso.

The position of Thurso, on the south shore of the Pentland Firth, through which dangerous channel numberless vessels pass every year, makes it a very desirable station for a life-boat.

— The-Life-boat, vol.IV, issue 41, 1 July 1861

A boathouse was commissioned to be built at Scrabster Harbour, at a cost of £103. In October 1860, a new 30 ft (9.1 m) self-righting 'Pulling and Sailing' (P&S) lifeboat, one with sails and (six) oars, arrived at Thurso, transported free of charge, initially to Granton, Edinburgh by the General Steam Navigation Company, and onwards to Thurso by the Aberdeen, Leith, and Clyde Steam Shipping Company.

The cost of the lifeboat was gifted to the Institution by A. W. Jaffray of London, who had also donated the cost of the St Andrews and Whitby lifeboats to the Institution. The lifeboat, costing £145, and built by Forrestt of Limehouse, London, was named Polly in accordance with the wishes of the donor.

Polly was only called upon six times in her 11 years on service, but in that time managed to save 49 lives. She was replaced in 1871 by a slightly larger 10-oared boat, Charley Lloyd, which served for another 19 years, being called out 31 times, and rescuing 255 lives.

In 1890, the third lifeboat assigned to Thurso was also the third lifeboat funded by the Co-operative Union, named Co-operator No.3 (ON 282) at a ceremony on the River Clyde, to coincide with the Co-operative Congress meeting in Glasgow.

1929 saw the arrival of Thurso's first motor-powered lifeboat. She was a 45-foot 6in Watson-class lifeboat, named H. C. J. (ON 708) by the Duchess of Portland on 13 September 1929. She served Thurso for 27 years, being launched 102 times, and saving the lives of 138 people.

On the 8 February 1944, the Thurso lifeboat H.C.J. was launched into a northerly gale at 14:30, when two dinghies were spotted 13 miles west of Thurso. On arrival on scene at 16:30, it was realised the two dinghies were in fact life-rafts, from the Norwegian vessel Freidig, which had foundered after the cargo shifted. Of the seven men aboard the rafts, there were only two survivors, who were landed at Wick at 19:10. For this service, Coxswain John McLeod was awarded the RNLI Bronze Medal.

RNLB Dunnet Head (Civil Service No.31) (ON 920) arrived on service at Thurso in January 1956. Funded by the Civil Service charity The Lifeboat Fund, she was a 47-foot Watson-class lifeboat, with two 60-hp Gardner 5LW engines, built by Wm. Osbourne of Littlehampton, and costing £35,000. She was named in a ceremony at Scrabster Harbour in August 1956 by HM Queen Elizabeth, The Queen Mother.

On the night of 10 December 1956, Disaster struck, when both the boat and boathouse were fully consumed by fire. Fire crews from both Thurso and Wick attended, but the intensity was such that only one wall of the boathouse remained, along with the iron keel and engines of the boat. The destruction was so complete that no evidence was left as to the cause of the outbreak.

The boat would be replaced by the Pentland (Civil Service No.31). This time fully funded by the RNLI, she still retained the Civil Service designation.

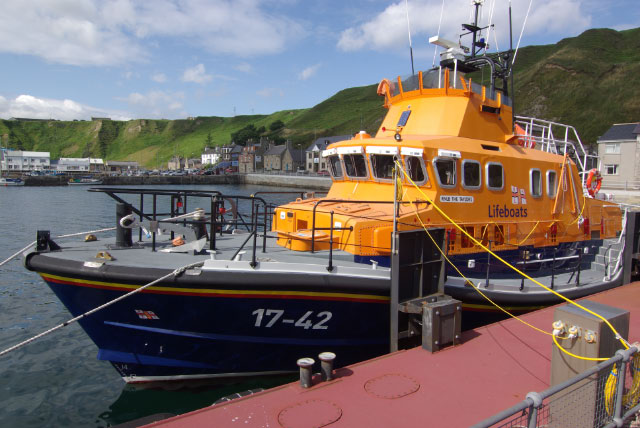
Thurso Severn-class lifeboat 17-42 The Taylors (ON 1273)

The Thurso Arun-class 52-43 The Queen Mother (ON 1149) was launched at 03:55 on 19 March 1999, into gale-force 8–9 conditions, to the aid of the 102 m (335 ft) long chemical tanker Multitank Ascania, disabled, and drifting towards Dunnet Head, carrying 1750 tonnes of Vinyl acetate monomer. In a service involving rescue helicopters from Lossiemouth and Stromness, the Orkney Harbours tug Einar, and also the Longhope lifeboat, the Master and crew were rescued, and the vessel was brought away from the shore, at one point being just 400m away from the rocks, particularly due to the towing efforts of the Thurso lifeboat. For his skill and seamanship shown in averting an ecological disaster, Coxswain William Farquhar was awarded the RNLI Bronze Medal, with the rest of the crew accorded Medal Service Certificates and badges.

In 1860, the first RNLI lifeboat at Thurso cost just £145. 144 years later, in 2004, Thurso received their latest All-weather lifeboat, a 25-knot Severn-class lifeboat, 17-42 The Taylors (ON 1273), costing £2 million.

At midday on Thursday 9 November 2017, Shetland coastguard received reports that the creel boat Sparkling Line was drifting to shore, after it had broken down, with its propeller fouled. Thurso lifeboat was launched into gale-force conditions, and waves of 33 ft (10 m). A nine-and-a-half hour operation took place to recover the vessel and crew in extreme conditions, considered one of the toughest calls encountered, with the tow line breaking five times. The creel boat was finally brought into Scrabster harbour at 22:00.

== Station honours ==
The following are awards made at Thurso:

- Medal of the Order of the British Empire
  John McLeod, Coxswain – 1944
- RNIPLS Silver Medal
  John Morgan, Chief Boatman, H.M. Coastguard, Staxigoe – 1830
  Benjamin Sinclair, Merchant – 1835
  John Smith – 1840
  James Wishart – 1847
  Robert Williamson, fisherman – 1848
- RNLI Silver Medal
  Donald Thompson – 1856
  John Brims, Coxswain – 1886
  John Brims, Coxswain – 1894 (Second-Service Clasp)
- RNLI Bronze Medal
  Angus McPhail, Coxswain – 1931
  John McLeod, Coxswain – 1944
  William Farquhar, Coxswain – 1999
- Medal Service Certificate
  William Munro, Second Coxswain – 1999
  Duncan Munro, Assistant Mechanic – 1999
  Donald Mackay – 1999
  Gordon Munro – 1999
  John Webster – 1999
  James Brims – 1999
  Kevin Oag – 1999
  Scott Youngson – 1999
- 'The Thanks of the Institution inscribed on Vellum'
  Angus McPhail, Coxswain – 1929
  Angus McPhail, Coxswain – 1930
  Adam McLeod, Second Coxswain – 1931
  Angus Macintosh, Coxswain – 1953
  John Manson, Second Coxswain – 1982
  Ross Farquhar, Coxswain – 1982
  William Donald Munro, Second Coxswain – 1997
  Duncan (Dougie) Munro, Second Coxswain – 2004
- Vellum Service Certificates
  William Miller, Acting Motor Mechanic – 1997
  Duncan Munro, Assistant Mechanic – 1997
  James Brims, crew member – 1997
  Thomas Davidson, crew member – 1997
  Donald McKenzie, crew member – 1997
  Gordon Munro, crew member – 1997
  Kevin Oag, crew member – 1997
  John Webster, crew member – 1997
  William Miller, Motor Mechanic – 2004
  Gordon Munro, Deputy Second Coxswain – 2004
  James Brims, Assistant Mechanic – 2004
  Bruce Farquhar, Emergency Mechanic – 2004
  Scott Youngson, crew member – 2004
  Kevin Davidson, crew member – 2004
- The Emile Robin Award 1999
  awarded by The Shipwrecked Fishermen and Mariners' Royal Benevolent Society
  William Farquhar, Coxswain – 1999
- Lady Swaythling Trophy for outstanding seamanship in 2004
  awarded by The Shipwrecked Fishermen and Mariners' Royal Benevolent Society
  Duncan (Dougie) Munro, Second Coxswain – 2004
- 'A Framed Letter of Thanks signed by the Chairman of the Institution'
  Captain and crew of RAF helicopter Rescue 137 – 1999
  Master and crew of the tug Einar – 1999
  William Farquar, Coxswain – 2001
  William Munro, Coxswain – 2002
- 'Letter of Appreciation signed by the Chief Executive of the Institution'
  Brian Williams, Honorary Secretary – 2001
  William Miller, Motor Mechanic – 2001
  Duncan Munro, Second Coxswain – 2001
  Gordon Munro, Deputy Second Coxswain – 2001
  James Brims, Assistant Mechanic – 2001
  Bruce Farquhar, Emergency Mechanic – 2004
  J. Webster, crew member – 2001
  Scott Youngson, crew member – 2001
- 'Letter of Appreciation signed by the Operations Director of the Institution'
  James Brims, crew member – 2001
  Kevin Davidson, crew member – 2001
  Gordon Munro, Deputy Second Coxswain – 2004
  James Brims, Assistant Mechanic – 2004
  Scott Youngson, crew member – 2004
  Kevin Davidson, crew member – 2004
- Iron plaques and diplomas awarded by The German Government
  Coxswain, Second Coxswain and Bowman – 1928
- Certificates of appreciation awarded by The German Government
  Thurso Lifeboat Crew – 1928
- Member, Order of the British Empire (MBE)
  John Miller, Honorary Secretary – 1948KBH

== Thurso lifeboats ==
=== Pulling and Sailing (P&S) lifeboats ===
ON (Note: ON is the RNLI's Official Number of the boat.)	Name	Built	On station	Class	Comments
Pre-368	Polly	1860	1860−1871	30-foot Peake self-righting (P&S)	(Note: 30 ft 0 in (9.14 m) x 7 ft 0 in (2.13 m) (6-oared) Peake-class self-righting (P&S) lifeboat, gift of A. W. Jaffray of London, built by Forrestt of Limehouse, London, costing £145. Altered to 10-oared in 1863.); Broken up in 1872.
Pre-554	Charley Lloyd	1871	1871−1890	33-foot Peake self-righting (P&S)	(Note: 33 ft 0 in (10.06 m) x 8 ft 0 in (2.44 m) (10-oared) Peake-class self-righting (P&S) lifeboat, legacy of Mr C. Lloyd of Kennington, built by Woolfe of Shadwell, London, costing £285.); Sold in 1890.
282	Co-operator No.3	1890	1890−1909	37-foot self-righting (P&S)	(Note: 37 ft 0 in (11.28 m) x 8 ft 0 in (2.44 m) (12-oared) self-righting (P&S) lifeboat, funded by the Manchester Central Co-Operative Society, built by Forrestt of Limehouse, London, costing £594); Condemned and broken up in 1909.
585	Sarah Austin	1908	1909−1929	40-foot Watson (P&S)	(Note: 40 ft 0 in (12.19 m) x 11 ft 0 in (3.35 m) (12-oared) Watson-class non-self-righting (P&S) lifeboat, legacy of Miss S. Austin of Tottenham, built by Thames Ironworks of Blackwall, London, costing £1,622.); Transferred to the Relief fleet. Sold in 1935.

Pre ON numbers are unofficial numbers used by the Lifeboat Enthusiasts' Society to reference early lifeboats not included on the official RNLI list.

=== Motor lifeboats ===
ON	Op.No. (Note: Op.No. is the RNLI's Operational Number of the boat carried on the hull.)	Name	Built	On station	Class	Comments
708	−	H. C. J.	1928	1929−1956	45-foot 6in Watson	Previously at Fowey and Holyhead.
920	−	Dunnet Head (Civil Service No.31)	1955	1956−1956	47-foot Watson	Destroyed by fire on 10 December 1956.
711	−	James Macfee	1928	1956−1957	45-foot 6in Watson	Relief lifeboat
940	−	Pentland (Civil Service No.31)	1957	1957−1970	47-foot Watson	Transferred to the Relief fleet. Later at The Mumbles.
1014	48-011	The Three Sisters	1970	1970−1988	Solent	Transferred to Wicklow.
1052	54-07	City of Bradford IV	1976	1988−1989	Arun	Previously at Humber. Transferred to Ballyglass.
1149	52-43	The Queen Mother	1989	1989−2004	Arun	Transferred to Longhope.
1273	17-42	The Taylors	2004	2004−	Severn	

More post-service details can be found on the respective lifeboat class pages.

== See also ==
- List of RNLI stations
- List of former RNLI stations
- Royal National Lifeboat Institution lifeboats
