= Sunderland Lifeboat Station =

RNLI lifeboat station in Tyne and Wear, England

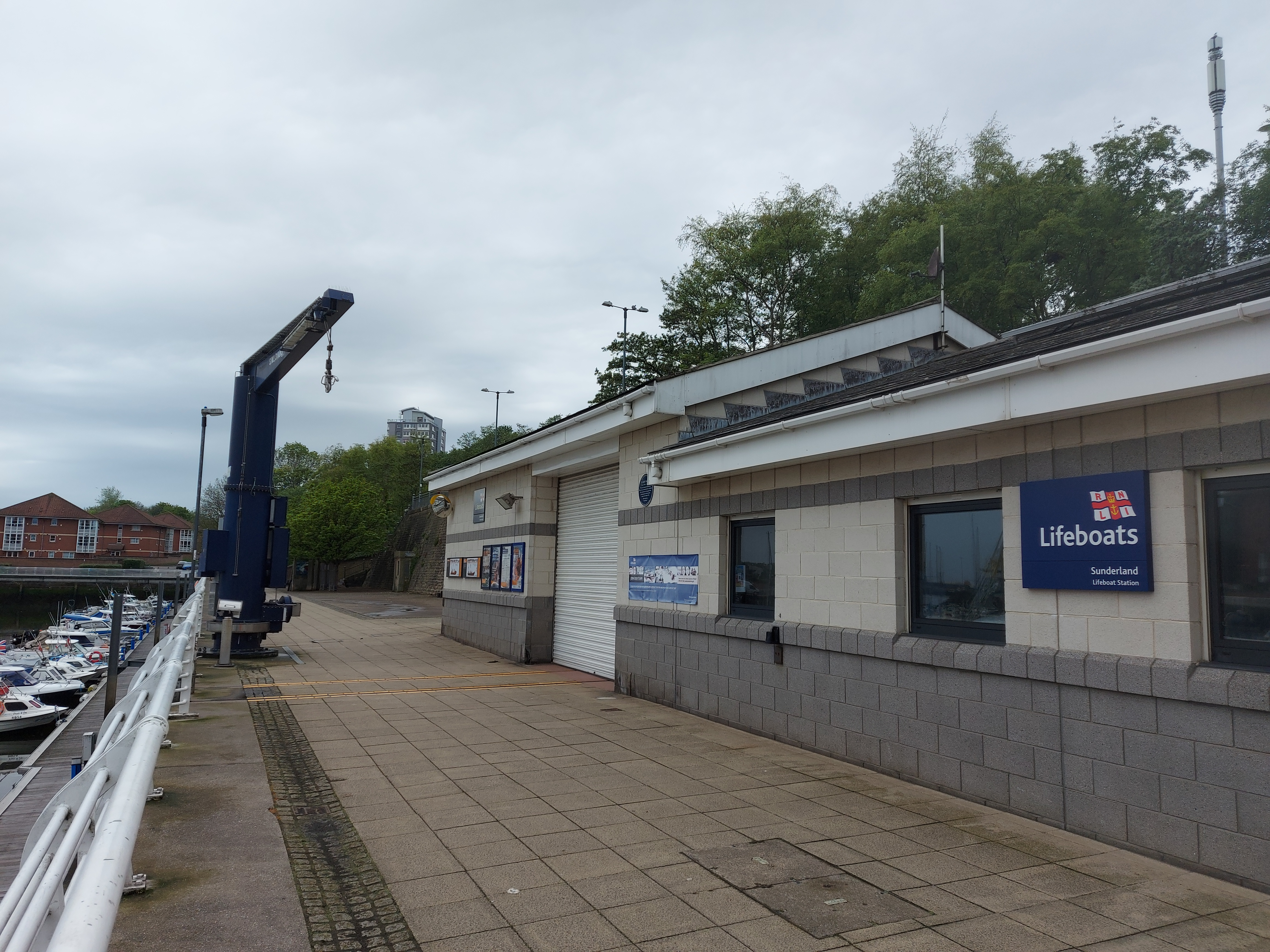
- North Dock Marina Lifeboat Station

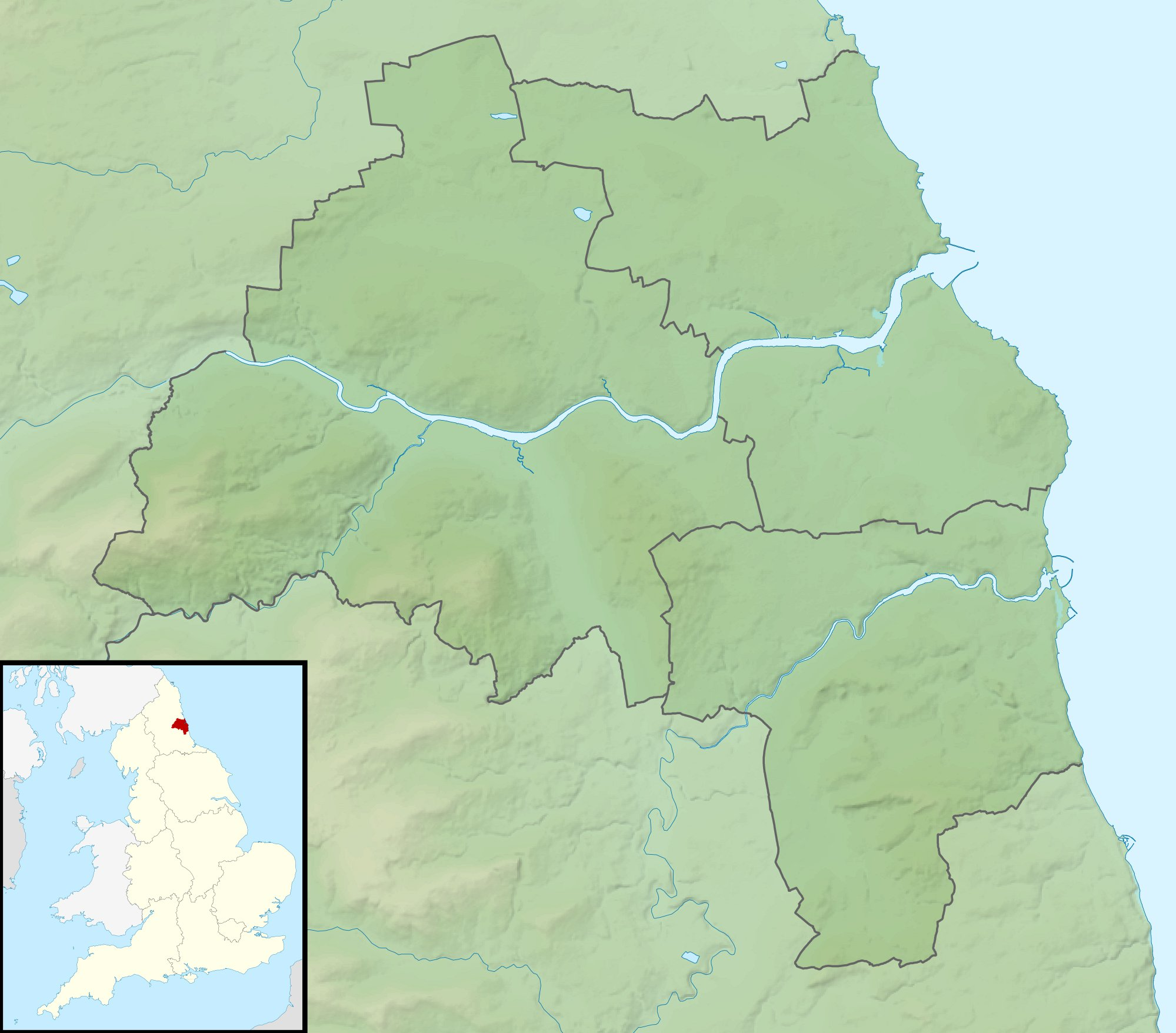
- Location within Tyne and Wear

General information
- Type: RNLI Lifeboat Station
- Location: Sunderland Lifeboat Station, Marine Activity Centre, North Dock, Sunderland, Tyne and Wear, SR6 0PW, England
- Coordinates: 54°55′10.1″N 1°22′03.8″W
- Opened: 1800; 1865 & 1871 RNLI
- Owner: Royal National Lifeboat Institution

Website
- Sunderland RNLI Lifeboat Station

Sunderland Lifeboat Station is located at North Dock Marina in the port city of Sunderland, which sits at the mouth of the River Wear, in the county of Tyne and Wear.

A lifeboat was first stationed here in 1800 by the Sunderland Lifeboat Committee, followed by a succession of privately operated lifeboats. Overall control of all Sunderland lifeboats finally passed to the Royal National Lifeboat Institution (RNLI) in 1871.

The station currently operates two Inshore lifeboats; the B-class (Atlantic 85) Seagil (B-945), on station since 2024, and a D-class (IB1) Thee Andy Cantle (D-879), on station since 2023.

== History ==
The history of lifeboats and stations at Sunderland is the most complicated and confusing of any of the 238 RNLI stations. Starting in 1800, it is thought there have been 13 different stations, and 35 lifeboats, along with station name and number changes. The history below is the best that can be gained at present, although research continues...

Inspired by the rescue efforts made to the vessel Ajax, wrecked on her maiden voyage just north of Sunderland harbour, Lord Dundas set about raising funds to provide a lifeboat at Sunderland. Thus was created the Sunderland Lifeboat Committee, who in 1800 placed a 27-foot non-self-righting lifeboat on the north side of the docks at Roker.

The Sunderland Lifeboat Committee boat is believed to be the first of a number of privately run lifeboats at Sunderland. Lifeboats were placed at various locations around the docks at Sunderland, from Roker down to Hendon Dock, by the following organisations:

- Sunderland Lifeboat Committee
- Sunderland Harbour Authority
- Sunderland Shipowners Association
- Sunderland Seamen's Lifeboat Association
- Royal National Lifeboat Institution.

There is only a record of one lifeboat being supplied by the Sunderland Lifeboat Committee, and the two boats of the Sunderland Harbour Authority placed at South Side No.1 station seem to have served their time, but were never replaced. No further details of these three boats are available.

Joseph Hodgson a carver of Sunderland, was awarded the RNLI Silver Medal on 3 January 1856 for his service to lifesaving over a period of 12 years, personally rescuing 10 people, and assisting in other lifeboat services. Two years later, William Davison was similarly awarded for his service as Coxswain on Sunderland lifeboats.

In 1865, the two lifeboats managed by the Sunderland Seamen's Lifeboat Association were in need of replacement, and the RNLI were requested to take over the management of the two boats, which was agreed. Both boats were withdrawn, with just one, the Duke of Wellington, being replaced with the Florence Nightingale (ON 185) at South Pier Station.

The South Side No.2 station, at the southern end of Sunderland Docks, near Hendon House, was opened by the Sunderland Shipowners Association (SSA) in 1850, but had to be closed in 1864, due to development work to create Hendon Dock. This would be the start of the South Outlet station. The SSA would then create another new North Side No.2 station on the north side of the docks in 1866, relocating the lifeboat from North Side No.1. A new slightly larger boat was provided there, later to be named Goodwill.

However, in 1871, the SSA requested that the RNLI take over their stations too, which again was duly agreed. Both lifeboats at the North side stations remained on service, the stations becoming named No.1 and No.2, (with the station already under the RNLI at South Pier becoming No.3). The lifeboat at South Outlet was replaced on 6 February 1872 by the John Foulston. A new boathouse and slipway were constructed near Hendon Dock by Hirst & Son, costing £624, with the station being named No.4.

The No.1 station lifeboat was renamed Goodwill in 1873, and transferred to the No.2 station. She was replaced by the Good Templar, so named from funds raised by the Independent order of Good Templars. On 23 October, Good Templar was launched to the Altona, holed on the Beacon Rocks. Managing to rescue all 14 aboard the vessel, the lifeboat was then also badly damaged on the rocks. All 27 aboard the lifeboat made it ashore, but the lifeboat was withdrawn from service.

The Goodwill would be renamed again in 1882, to Mary, but was withdrawn in 1887, with the No.2 station closed. As a result, No.3 station became No.2, and No.4 became No.3, but this is not recorded in the station list below, to prevent confusion. The No.1 station was later renamed 'Roker', with the other two stations once again being South Pier and South Outlet.

South Pier lifeboat Junius (ON 324) was launched to the steamship Jacinth of Dundee, holed on the Beacon Rocks on 2 Mar 1897. In gale force conditions, all 11 crew were rescued.

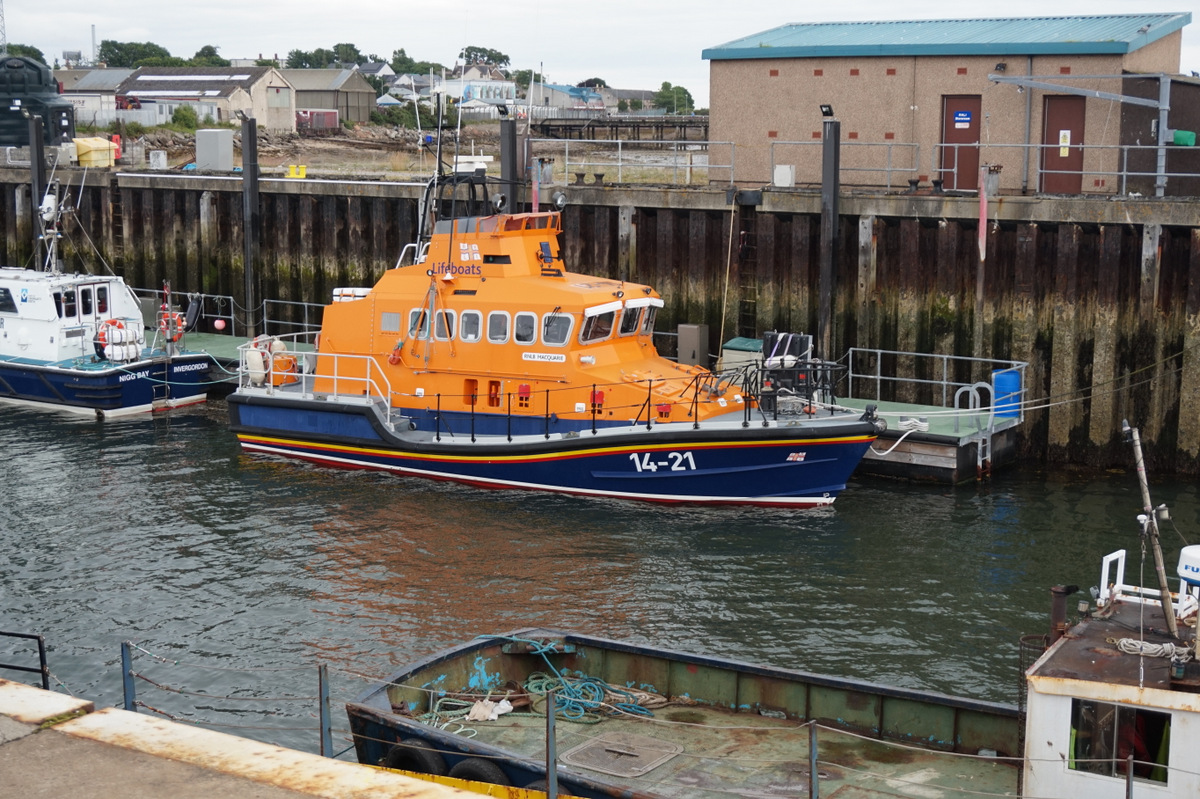
RNLB 14-21 MacQuarie

A new 'North Dock' station, with roller-slipway, was constructed in 1900 to the south west side of the North Dock at a cost of £1,100. This was to house a new boat, George Woodfindin (ON 450), funded by the cutlery manufacturer and philanthropist of Sheffield, which arrived on 22 October 1900. With this new boat on service, the Roker and South Pier stations were closed on 30 October 1900.

South Outlet lifeboat remained on service, but on 25 July 1905, the boathouse would be devastated by fire, the boat saved only due to the prompt actions of Honorary Secretary W. J. Oliver. He was rewarded with an RNLI Aneroid Barometer.

A motor lifeboat would be placed at Sunderland in 1911. The J. McConnell Hussey (ON 343) had been a 'Pulling and Sailing' (P&S) lifeboat, one with sails and oars, but had subsequently been fitted with an engine. Previously on station at Newhaven and Tynemouth, the lifeboat was placed at moorings in the harbour. The arrival of a motor lifeboat prompted the closure of the South Outlet station in 1912, but only 2 years later, the J. McConnell Hussey was found to be unfit for service, and withdrawn. After many years with numerous lifeboats, Sunderland now had just one, the George Woodfindin, still at North Dock.

On 21 January 1913, the Orion of Flensburg departed South Dock, only to have her rudder and propellers torn off on White Shell Rocks. The George Woodfindin would rescue all 19 crew. The remains of the wreck were visible at low tide for the next 70 years.

George Woodfindin (ON 450) would transfer across to a new design boathouse, that had been constructed near the South Side Ferry Landing in 1916. It used a pulley system, where the boat would sit on a cradle, and be lifted up and down to the water, employed due to the varying heights of the tide. Only two boathouses of this design were constructed by the RNLI, the other being at Buckie. It would be another two years before a replacement motor lifeboat was placed at Sunderland, the Henry Vernon (ON 613), arriving in February 1918.

In 1935, another new lifeboat station was constructed, and was located at the north end of the south side pier on reclaimed land, near the current Pilot Lookout Tower. The boathouse was built to house a new larger lifeboat, a 46ft Watson-class also named Henry Vernon (ON 778), It had a deep-water roller-slipway, and was situated close to the harbour entrance. It would remain in use for the next 55 years, the remains of which can still be seen today.

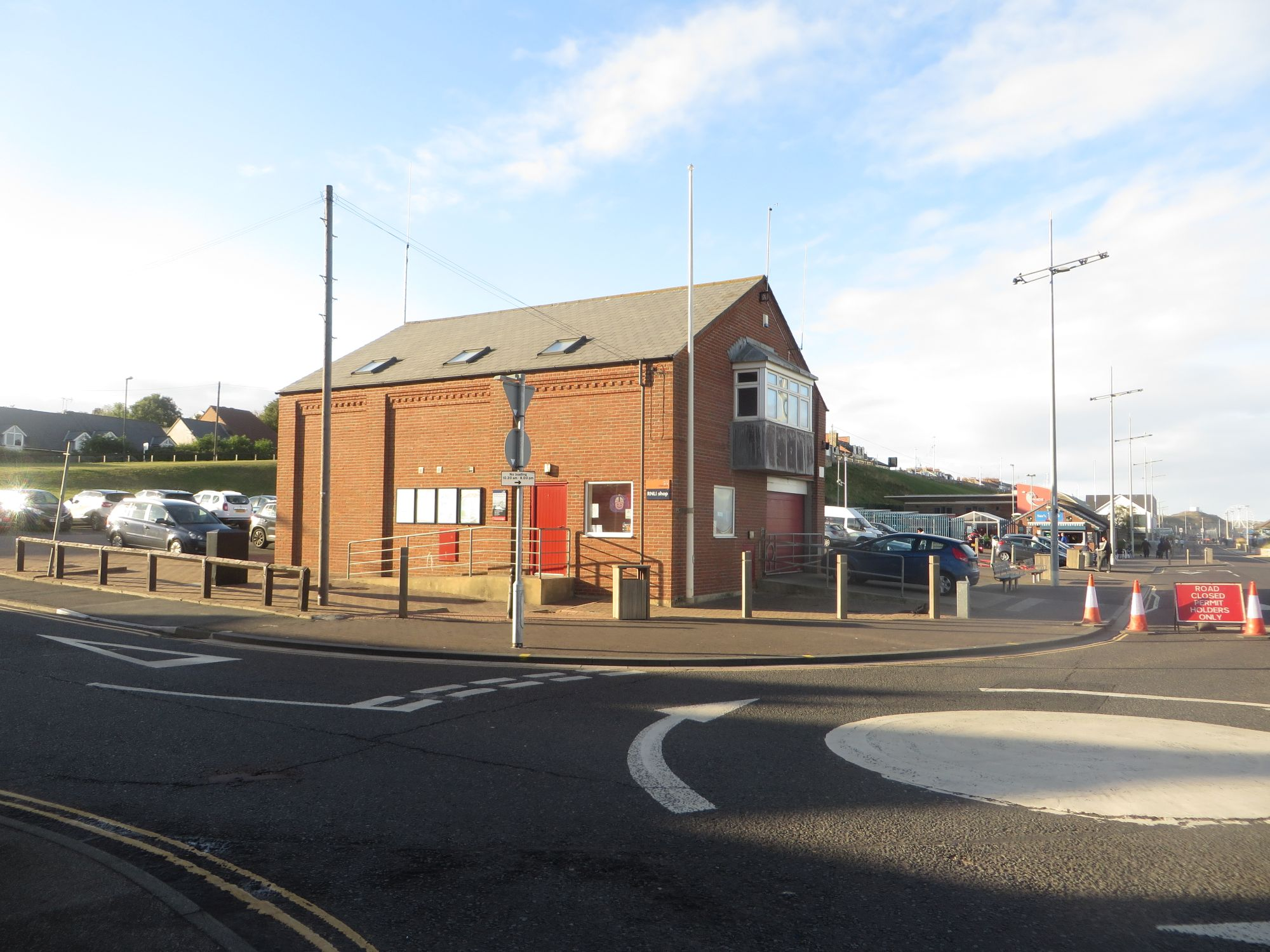
Sunderland former ILB Station, Roker

The station would move back across to the north side in 1990, with the arrival of a Waveney-class lifeboat in 1990, 44-017 Wavy Line (ON 1043), which was moored afloat at North Dock Marina, followed by a Trent-class lifeboat 14-21 MacQuarie (ON 1225) in 1997.

A base for the D-class Inshore boat was built on Marine Walk in Roker in 1998. In 2004, the Trent-class All-weather lifeboat was withdrawn, replaced with a B-class (Atlantic 75) fast Inshore boat. New crew facilities, and a boathouse for both ILBs, with launch davit, were constructed at North Dock Marina in 2008, at a cost of £242,000. The Lifeguard team and the souvenir shop now occupying the Marine Walk building.

== Station honours ==
The following are awards made at Sunderland

- RNLI Silver Medal

Joseph Hodgson, Carver – 1856

William Davison, Coxswain – 1858

Ralph Thompson, Coxswain – 1891

- The Thanks of the Institution inscribed on Vellum

William J. Oliver, Honorary Secretary – 1916

Michael Tighe, Helm – 1984

- Vellum Service Certificate

Alan Dixon – 1984

- A Framed Letter of Thanks signed by the Chairman of the Institution

Anthony Lee, Coxswain – 1987

Gerry McGill – 1995
Ian Donkin – 1995
David Graham – 1995

- A Collective Letter of Thanks signed by the Chairman of the Institution

Michael Cowe, Helm – 1998
Martin Barry, crew member – 1998
Brian Clark-Barkness, crew member – 1998

- Testimonial on Vellum, awarded by the Royal Humane Society

Grant Smith – 1990

- Commendation, awarded by the Chief Constable of Northumbria

Roger Cook, Helm – 1996
Martin Robbie, crew member – 1996
Tony Dixon – 1996
Two Police Constables – 1996

- Testimonial Resuscitation Certificate, awarded by the Royal Humane Society

Ernest Laws, Second Coxswain – 1999
Brian Clark-Barkness, crew member – 1999
David Graham, crew member – 1999

== Roll of honour ==
In memory of those lost whilst serving Sunderland lifeboats.

- Collapsed and died whilst running to the lifeboat house, 11 May 1910

John Henry Davison, Coxswain (South Outlet) (49)

== Sunderland lifeboats ==
=== North Side No.1 / No.1 Station / Roker ===
54°55′13.0″N 1°21′51.6″W

ON (Note: ON is the RNLI's Official Number of the boat.)	Name	Built	On station	Type	Comments
–	Unnamed	1800	1800–1818	27-foot 6in North Country	(Note: 27-foot 6in x 9-foot 6in North Country non-self-righting lifeboat, gift of the Lord Dundas LB fund, and LLoyd's, built by William Wake of Bishopwearmouth, costing £185.) (Sunderland Lifeboat Assoc.); Transferred to Whitburn in 1818.
–	Unnamed	1831	1831–1851+	27-foot 6in North Country.	(Note: 27-foot 6in x 9-foot 3in (10-oared) North Country non-self-righting lifeboat, funded from Harbour Dues, built by William Wake Jr., of Bishopwearmouth.) (Sunderland Harbour Auth.)
Pre-339	Unnamed	1859	1859–1866	29-foot 6in North Country	(Note: 29-foot 6in x 7-foot 6in (10-oared) North Country non-self-righting lifeboat, built by Wake of Sunderland.) (Sunderland Shipowners Assoc.); Transferred to No.2 Station (North Side) in 1866.
Pre-450	Unnamed	1866	1866–1873	30-foot 3in North Country	(Note: 30-foot 3in x 8-foot 7in North Country non-self-righting lifeboat, built by Wake of Sunderland.) (Sunderland Shipowners Assoc.); Transferred to No.2 Station (North Side) in 1873, and renamed Goodwill.
Pre-573	Good Templar	1873	1873–1875	33-foot Self-Righting (P&S)	(Note: 33-foot x 8-foot 2in (10-oared) self-righting (P&S) lifeboat, gift of the Ind. Order of Good Templars LB Fund, built by Forrestt of Limehouse, London, costing £278.); Damaged and withdrawn from service in 1875
Pre-612	Good Templar	1876	1876–1889	30-foot Self-Righting (P&S)	(Note: 30-foot x 8-foot (8-oared) self-righting (P&S) lifeboat, gift of the Ind. Order of Good Templars LB Fund, built by Woolfe of Shadwell, London, costing £275.)
254	William Hedley	1889	1889–1900	31-foot Self-Righting (P&S)	(Note: 31-foot x 7-foot 3in (10-oared) self-righting (P&S) lifeboat, legacy of Mr W. Hedley of Manchester, built by Forrestt of Limehouse, London, costing £301.)

Station Closed in 1900
Pre ON numbers are unofficial numbers used by the Lifeboat Enthusiast Society to reference early lifeboats not included on the official RNLI list.

=== South Side (No.1) ===
54°54′49.3″N 1°21′33.6″W

ON	Name	Built	On station	Type	Comments
–	Unnamed	1808	1808–1843	North Country	(Note: North Country non-self-righting lifeboat, likely built by William Wake, costing £106.) (Sunderland Harbour Auth.).
–	Unnamed	1819	1819–1851	26-foot North Country	(Note: 26-foot x 9-foot 6in (10-oared) North Country non-self-righting lifeboat, built by Wake of Sunderland.) (Sunderland Harbour Auth.).

Station closed ~1851

=== South Side (No.2) ===
54°54′11.8″N 1°21′44.2″W

ON	Name	Built	On station	Type	Comments
Pre-228	Unnamed	1850	1850–1864	34-foot North Country	(Note: 34-foot x 10-foot 6in (14-oared) North Country non-self-righting, built by Thomas Wake and son of Sunderland, costing £130.) (Sunderland Shipowners Assoc.). Lifeboat transferred to South Outlet in 1864.

Station closed in 1864 when Hendon Dock was constructed.

=== Harbour Moorings (1856) ===
ON	Name	Built	On station	Type	Comments
–	Unnamed	1855	1856–1865	40-foot Self-Righting (P&S)	(Note: 40-foot self-righting (P&S) lifeboat, built locally to a design by Hawkesworth of Torquay.) (Sunderland Seamen's Lifeboat Assoc.).

Lifeboat transferred to RNLI in 1865, then withdrawn.

=== North Side No.2 / No. 2 Station ===
54°55′04.9″N 1°21′47.9″W

ON	Name	Built	On station	Type	Comments
Pre-339	Unnamed	1859	1866–1873	29-foot 6in North Country	(Note: 29-foot 6in x 7-foot 6in (10-oared) North Country non-self-righting lifeboat, built by Wake of Sunderland.) (Sunderland Shipowners Assoc.)
Pre-450	Goodwill	1866	1873–1882	30-foot 3in North Country	(Note: 30-foot 3in x 8-foot 7in North Country non-self-righting lifeboat, built by Wake of Sunderland.) (Sunderland Shipowners Assoc.); Renamed Mary in 1882.
Pre-450	Mary	1866	1882–1887	30-foot 3in North Country	

Station closed in 1887

=== South Pier / No.3 Station ===
54°54′54.4″N 1°21′39.6″W

ON	Name	Built	On station	Type	Comments
–	Duke of Wellington	1853	1858–1865	28-foot Self-Righting (P&S)	(Note: 28-foot x 7-foot 6in (6-oared) self-righting (P&S) lifeboat, built by Mr. T. C. Clarkson of London) (Sunderland Seamen's Lifeboat Assoc.). Previously at Dover. Lifeboat transferred to RNLI in 1865, replaced.
185	Florence Nightingale	1865	1865–1892	33-foot Self-Righting (P&S)	(Note: 33-foot x 8-foot 2in (10-oared) self-righting (P&S) lifeboat, gift of the Derby LB fund, built by Woolfe of Shadwell, London, costing £250.)
324	Junius	1891	1892–1900	34-foot Self-Righting (P&S)	(Note: 34-foot x 7-foot 6in (10-oared) self-righting (P&S) lifeboat, gift of Mr J. Coppin of Corbridge-on-Tyne, built by Waterman of Cremyll, Cornwall, costing £333.)

Station Closed in 1900

=== South Outlet / No.4 Station ===
54°54′13.0″N 1°21′26.9″W

ON	Name	Built	On station	Type	Comments
Pre-228	Unnamed	1850	1864–1871	34-foot North Country	(Note: 34-foot x 10-foot 6in (14-oared) North Country non-self-righting lifeboat, built by Thomas Wake and son, costing £130.) (Sunderland Shipowners Assoc.); 1864, transferred from South Side (No.2). 1871, transferred to RNLI, replaced.
Pre-562	John Foulston	1871	1871–1887	36-foot Self-Righting (P&S)	(Note: 36-foot x 9-foot (12-oared) self-righting (P&S) lifeboat, gift of Mrs Foulston, of Plymouth and Kensington, built by Forrestt of Limehouse, London, costing £356.)
115	Caroline Clagett	1887	1887–1894	37-foot Self-Righting (P&S)	(Note: 37-foot x 8-foot (12-oared) self-righting (P&S) lifeboat, gift of Mrs C. Clagett of London, built by Forrestt of Limehouse, London, costing £448.)
368	Richard and Nellie Hodges	1894	1894–1908	38-foot Self-Righting (P&S)	(Note: 38-foot x 8-foot (12-oared) self-righting (P&S) lifeboat, gift of Mrs Hodges of Shepherd's Bush, built by Forrestt of Limehouse, London, costing £547.)
Station Closed June 1908–September 1908
365	Nancy Newbon	1894	1908–1912	38-foot Self-Righting (P&S)	(Note: 38-foot x 8-foot (12-oared) self-righting (P&S) lifeboat, legacy of Mr R. A. Newbon of Islington, built by Forrestt of Limehouse, London, costing £545.); Previously at Mullion.

Station Closed in 1912

=== North Dock ===
54°55′04.0″N 1°21′57.2″W

ON	Name	Built	On station	Type	Comments
450	George Woodfindin	1900	1900–1916	37-foot Self-Righting (P&S)	(Note: 37-foot (10-oared) self-righting (P&S) lifeboat, legacy of Mr G. Woodfindin of Sheffield, built by Thames Ironworks of Blackwall, London, costing £1,018.); Lifeboat transferred to Ferry Landing Station in 1916.

Station Closed in 1916

=== Harbour Moorings (1911) ===
ON	Name	Built	On station	Type	Comments
343	J. McConnell Hussey	1892	1911–1914	38-foot Self-Righting (Motor)	(Note: 38-foot x 8-foot self-righting (motor) lifeboat, gift of Miss Curling, built by Wm. T. Ellis of Lowestoft, costing £418.); Previously at Folkestone, Newhaven and Tynemouth. (Motor conversion in 1903).

Lifeboat found to be unfit for service and withdrawn in 1914.

=== Ferry Landing ===
54°54′48.4″N 1°21′58.7″W

ON	Name	Built	On station	Type	Comments
450	George Woodfindin	1900	1916–1918	37-foot Self-Righting (P&S)	
613	Henry Vernon	1910	1918–1935	40-foot Self-Righting (motor)	(Note: 40-foot self-righting (motor) lifeboat, legacy of Mrs Vernon, built by Thames Ironworks of Blackwall, London, costing £3,664.); Previously at Tynemouth

Station closed in 1935

=== South Side ===
54°54′56.0″N 1°21′47.6″W

ON	Name	Built	On station	Class	Comments
778	Edward and Isabella Irwin	1935	1935–1963	46-foot Watson	
969	William Myers and Sarah Jane Myers	1963	1963–1990	47-foot Watson	

Station closed in 1990.

=== Roker ILB Station ===
54°55′13.9″N 1°21′51.9″W

Op. No. (Note: Op. No. is the RNLI's Operational Number of the boat carried on the hull.)	Name	On station	Class	Comments
D-94	Unnamed	1966–1976	D-class (RFD PB16)	
D-217	Unnamed	1977–1987	D-class (RFD PB16)	
D-329	BBC Radio Newcastle I	1987–1994	D-class (EA16)	One of two boats funded by the Lifesaver Appeal on BBC Radio Newcastle in 1986
D-470	Landlubber	1994–2003	D-class (EA16)	

=== North Dock Marina ===
54°55′10.1″N 1°22′03.8″W

==== All-weather lifeboats ====
ON	Op. No.	Name	Built	On station	Class	Comments
1043	44-017	Wavy Line	1976	1990–1997	Waveney	Previously at Donaghadee
1225	14-21	MacQuarie	1997	1997–2004	Trent	

All-weather lifeboat withdrawn in 2004

==== Inshore lifeboats ====
Op. No.	Name	On station	Class	Comments
D-608	Helen and Ian Tytler	2003–2011	D-class (IB1)	
B-705	Vera Skilton	2004	B-class (Atlantic 75)	
B-762	Jack & Joyce Burcombe	2004–2007	B-class (Atlantic 75)	
B-817	Wolseley	2007–2024	B-class (Atlantic 85)	
D-747	My Jo	2011–2023	D-class (IB1)	
D-879	Thee Andy Cantle	2023–	D-class (IB1)	
B-945	Seagil	2024–	B-class (Atlantic 85)	

== See also ==
- List of RNLI stations
- List of former RNLI stations
- Royal National Lifeboat Institution lifeboats
