= 47ft Watson-class lifeboat =

Former RNLI lifeboat class

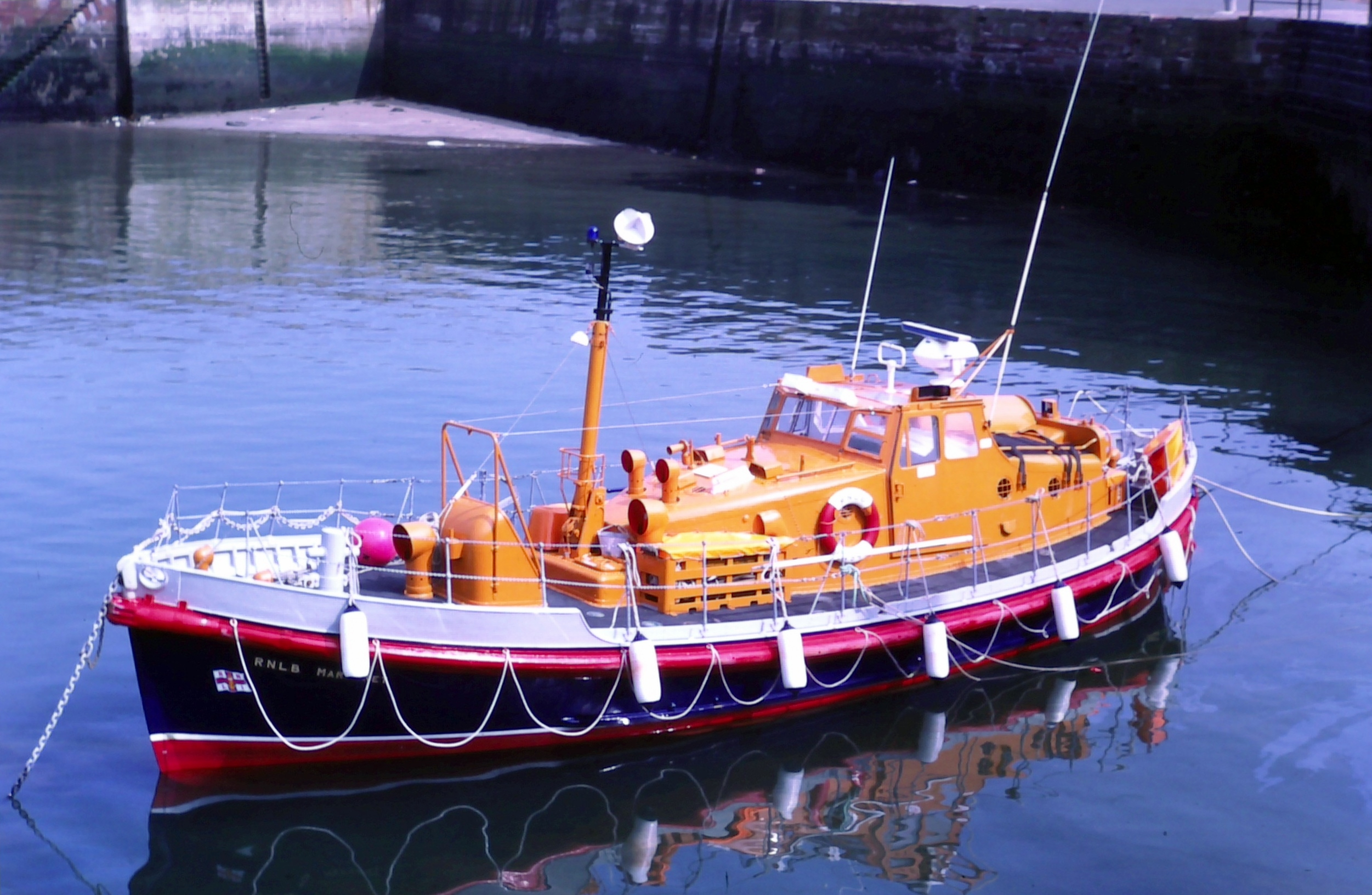
- RNLB Margaret (ON 947) at Dunbar, 1981.

Class overview
- Name: 47ft Watson class
- Builders: William Osborne, Littlehampton; Groves & Guttridge, Cowes; J. Samuel White, Cowes
- Operators: Royal National Lifeboat Institution
- Preceded by: 46ft 9in Watson-class
- Succeeded by: Tyne-class
- Cost: £34,346–£40,500
- Built: 1955–1963
- In service: 1956–1991
- Completed: 18
- Lost: 2
- Retired: 16

General characteristics
- Class & type: 47ft Watson
- Displacement: 23 tons
- Length: 47 ft (14 m)
- Beam: 13 ft (4.0 m)
- Draught: 4 ft 5 in (1.35 m)
- Propulsion: 2 × 60-bhp Gardner 5LW 5-cyl. diesel
- Speed: 9 knots
- Range: 280 nmi (520 km; 320 mi)
- Crew: 8

The 47 ft Watson-class was a class of non-self-righting displacement hull lifeboat, built from 1955 to 1963 and operated by the Royal National Lifeboat Institution (RNLI) between 1956 and 1991.

== History ==
The 47 ft Watson was the final development of the basic hull design laid out by George Lennox Watson in the late nineteenth century and was designed by James Barnett. They were the final Watson type boats to be built and survived in service almost to the end of the displacement hull era.

The prototype, Dunnet Head (Civil Service No.31) (ON 920), was built in 1955 and was placed on station at Thurso in January 1956. Unfortunately, on 10 December 1956, the boathouse at Thurso caught fire and both it and the lifeboat inside were destroyed. No further 47 ft Watsons were built during 1956 and production of the 46 ft 9in Watson continued during that year. Production of the new type resumed in 1957, with the first being a replacement boat for Thurso, Pentland (ON 940). The boat still carried the Civil Service no.31 designation, although this time, it was fully funded by the RNLI.

Production continued until 1963 when large displacement hull development turned to the self-righting 48 ft 6in Oakley-class and later Solent-class lifeboat.

== Description ==
Compared to the preceding 46ft 9in Watson-class lifeboat, the new boats had a hull extended by 3 inches in both length and beam. The wheelhouse was fully enclosed with sliding doors on either side and there were bulwarks above the fenders fore and aft and, from the second boat, the forward cabin was increased in size.

As with the previous year's 42ft Watson-class, the boats were powered by commercial diesel engines rather than the RNLI designed units used previously. In this case, two 60-bhp Gardner 5LW five cylinder diesels were fitted with the exhaust being taken up the mast as on the later 46 ft 9in boats.

As built, the boats had line aerials rigged from the forward mast to a pole mast aft of the rear cabin. During their careers, this rig was replaced by twin pole aerials and the aft mast was removed. Radar was fitted on a bracket on the port side of the rear cabin roof (some had it fitted to the wheelhouse roof).

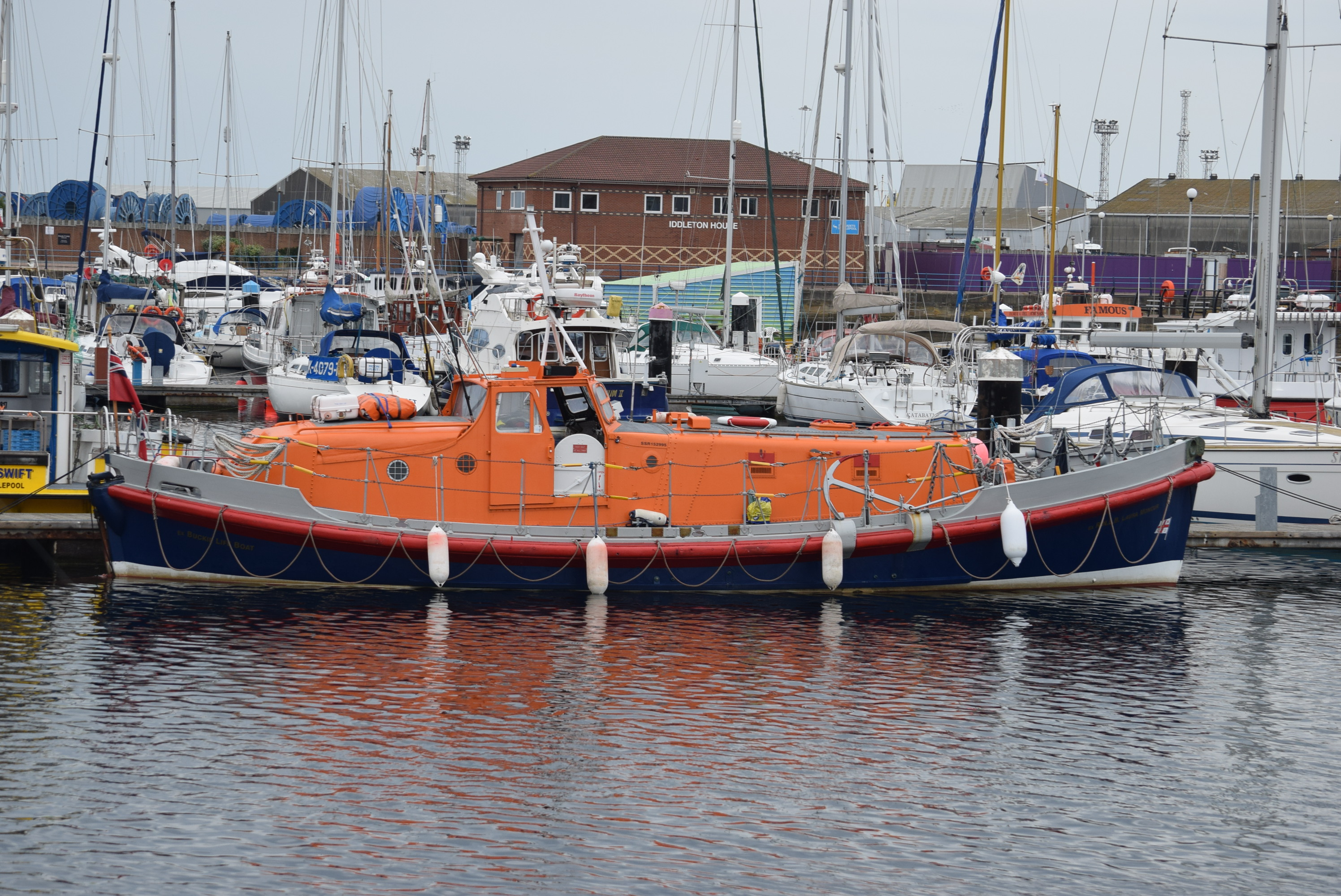
RNLB Laura Moncur at Hartlepool, 2018

From 1973, the boats were modified to become self-righting by, in most cases, the fitting of an air bag on the starboard side of the rear cabin roof, adjacent to the radar. This gave a once only self-righting ability which was successfully deployed when Salcombe's The Baltic Exchange capsized on service in 1983. Six boats were rebuilt with larger forward and aft superstructures (akin to the 48 ft 6in Oakley and Solent classes) which made them inherently self-righting. In these boats the masts were removed and the exhaust outlets were on the side of the hull. The engines in these six were uprated to 70-bhp and these modified boats were the longest lasting of the type, all but one serving into the 1990s.

== Fleet ==
ON (Note: ON is the RNLI's Official Number of the boat.)	Name	Built	In service	Stations	Radar	Comments
920	Dunnet Head (Civil Service No.31)	1955	1956	Thurso	No	(Note: Gift of the Civil Service LB fund, built by William Osborne of Littlehampton, costing £35,000.); Destroyed by fire in Thurso boathouse, 10 December 1956.
940	Pentland (Civil Service No.31)	1957	1957–1970	Thurso	1972	(Note: Funded by the RNLI, built by J. Samuel White of Cowes, costing £34,346. Modified to be inherently self-righting, 1972.) Sold March 1991. Unaltered condition at West Wales Maritime Museum, Pembroke Dock, December 2025.
940	Pentland (Civil Service No.31)	1957	1970–1974	Relief fleet	1972	Sold March 1991. Unaltered condition at West Wales Maritime Museum, Pembroke Dock, December 2025.
940	Pentland (Civil Service No.31)	1957	1974–1985	The Mumbles	1972	Sold March 1991. Unaltered condition at West Wales Maritime Museum, Pembroke Dock, December 2025.
940	Pentland (Civil Service No.31)	1957	1986–1990	Workington	1972	Sold March 1991. Unaltered condition at West Wales Maritime Museum, Pembroke Dock, December 2025.
947	Margaret	1958	1959–1986	Dunbar	1973	(Note: Legacies of Mr Black and Mr Taylor, built by Groves and Guttridge of Cowes, costing £35,000. Added airbag for self-righting.) Sold 1987. Renamed Hallowstell, later Theo. Sunk at Rathmullan, Ireland, May 2006.
950	Kathleen Mary	1959	1959–1977	Newhaven	1969	(Note: Funded from an anonymous gift, built by William Osborne of Littlehampton, costing £34,500. Modified to be inherently self-righting, 1972.) Sold April 1990. Renamed Katie May. Unaltered condition at Ellesmere Port Boat Museum, November 2024.
950	Kathleen Mary	1959	1977–1979	Relief fleet	1969	Sold April 1990. Renamed Katie May. Unaltered condition at Ellesmere Port Boat Museum, November 2024.
950	Kathleen Mary	1959	1979–1987	Porthdinllaen	1969	Sold April 1990. Renamed Katie May. Unaltered condition at Ellesmere Port Boat Museum, November 2024.
950	Kathleen Mary	1959	1987–1988	Appledore	1969	Sold April 1990. Renamed Katie May. Unaltered condition at Ellesmere Port Boat Museum, November 2024.
951	Francis W. Wotherspoon of Paisley	1959	1959–1979	Islay	1973	(Note: Legacy of Mr Wotherspoon, built by William Osborne of Littlehampton, costing £35,000. Added airbag for self-righting.) Sold October 1986. Renamed Kimros Man. Now in unaltered condition as Francis W. Wotherspoon at Douglas, Isle of Man, August 2024.
951	Francis W. Wotherspoon of Paisley	1959	1979–1981	Relief fleet	1973	Sold October 1986. Renamed Kimros Man. Now in unaltered condition as Francis W. Wotherspoon at Douglas, Isle of Man, August 2024.
951	Francis W. Wotherspoon of Paisley	1959	1981	Fishguard	1973	Sold October 1986. Renamed Kimros Man. Now in unaltered condition as Francis W. Wotherspoon at Douglas, Isle of Man, August 2024.
951	Francis W. Wotherspoon of Paisley	1959	1982–1986	Workington	1973	Sold October 1986. Renamed Kimros Man. Now in unaltered condition as Francis W. Wotherspoon at Douglas, Isle of Man, August 2024.
953	Sarah Jane and James Season	1960	1960–1986	Teesmouth	1970	(Note: Legacies of Mr Season, Mr Wright, Miss Lax and Mrs Pearson, built by Groves & Guttridge of Cowes, costing £35,000. Added airbag for self-righting.) Sold 1989. Renamed Manx Voyager. Unaltered condition at Ramsey, Isle of Man, January 2025.
953	Sarah Jane and James Season	1960	1986–1988	Shoreham Harbour	1970	Sold 1989. Renamed Manx Voyager. Unaltered condition at Ramsey, Isle of Man, January 2025.
954	Solomon Browne	1960	1960–1981	Penlee	1969	(Note: Legacies of Mrs Browne, Miss Davies and Miss Waterhouse, built by William Osborne of Littlehampton, costing £35,500. Added airbag for self-righting.) Wrecked on service with all eight crew lost, 19 December 1981. See Penlee lifeboat disaster.
955	The Robert	1960	1960–1978	Broughty Ferry	1969	(Note: Funded from an anonymous gift, built by William Osborne of Littlehampton, costing £35,500. Modified to be inherently self-righting, 1978.) Sold February 1992. Renamed Harriet Claire. Now in unaltered condition as The Robert at Kingswear, Devon, April 2025.
955	The Robert	1960	1978–1984	Baltimore	1969	Sold February 1992. Renamed Harriet Claire. Now in unaltered condition as The Robert at Kingswear, Devon, April 2025.
955	The Robert	1960	1985–1988	Lytham St Annes	1969	Sold February 1992. Renamed Harriet Claire. Now in unaltered condition as The Robert at Kingswear, Devon, April 2025.
955	The Robert	1960	1989–1991	Beaumaris	1969	Sold February 1992. Renamed Harriet Claire. Now in unaltered condition as The Robert at Kingswear, Devon, April 2025.
957	The Jeanie	1961	1961–1986	Portpatrick	1968	(Note: Funded from an anonymous gift, built by Groves & Guttridge of Cowes, costing £35,000. Added airbag for self-righting.) Sold in 1987. Renamed Jeanie Brandon. Last reported in unaltered condition on the River Danube near the Rhine Canal, October 2017.
958	Laura Moncur	1961	1961–1984	Buckie	1970	(Note: Legacy of Miss Moncur, a gift from Miss J. B. Moncur, plus RNLI funds, built by Groves & Guttridge of Cowes, costing £35,500. Modified to be inherently self-righting, 1974.) Sold November 1988. Renamed Chizz. Fully restored as Laura Moncur, at Blakeney, Norfolk, December 2025.
958	Laura Moncur	1961	1984–1986	Relief fleet	1970	Sold November 1988. Renamed Chizz. Fully restored as Laura Moncur, at Blakeney, Norfolk, December 2025.
958	Laura Moncur	1961	1986–1987	Appledore	1970	Sold November 1988. Renamed Chizz. Fully restored as Laura Moncur, at Blakeney, Norfolk, December 2025.
958	Laura Moncur	1961	1987–1988	Relief fleet	1970	Sold November 1988. Renamed Chizz. Fully restored as Laura Moncur, at Blakeney, Norfolk, December 2025.
959	Helen Wycherley	1961	1961–1969	Whitehills	1975	(Note: Legacy of Mr Wycherley, a gift from Miss Robb, plus RNLI funds, built by Groves & Guttridge of Cowes, costing £35,500. Added airbag for self-righting.) Sold December 1988. Renamed Parachinar. Now under restoration as ex-RNLB Helen Wycherley at Swadlincote, Derbyshire, June 2025.
959	Helen Wycherley	1961	1969–1987	Courtmacsherry Harbour	1975	Sold December 1988. Renamed Parachinar. Now under restoration as ex-RNLB Helen Wycherley at Swadlincote, Derbyshire, June 2025.
959	Helen Wycherley	1961	1987–1988	Relief fleet	1975	Sold December 1988. Renamed Parachinar. Now under restoration as ex-RNLB Helen Wycherley at Swadlincote, Derbyshire, June 2025.
962	T. G. B.	1962	1962–1969	Longhope	1970	(Note: Funded from an anonymous gift, built by J. Samuel White of Cowes, costing £35,500. Added airbag for self-righting.); Capsized on service at Longhope with eight crew lost, 17 March 1969. Sold 1986. On display since July 1986 at the Scottish Maritime Museum, Irvine, December 2025.
962	T. G. B.	1962	1969–1978	Arranmore	1970	Capsized on service at Longhope with eight crew lost, 17 March 1969. Sold 1986. On display since July 1986 at the Scottish Maritime Museum, Irvine, December 2025.
962	T. G. B.	1962	1978–1985	Relief fleet	1970	Capsized on service at Longhope with eight crew lost, 17 March 1969. Sold 1986. On display since July 1986 at the Scottish Maritime Museum, Irvine, December 2025.
963	A.M.T.	1962	1962–1986	Howth	1973	(Note: Legacies of Mr Austin, Miss Mulhauser and Mr Toon, built by J. Samuel White of Cowes, costing £37,000. Added airbag for self-righting.) Sold June 1989. Renamed Crack o Dawn. Now in unaltered condition as AMiTy, at Whitby, December 2025.
963	A.M.T.	1962	1986–1989	Relief fleet	1973	Sold June 1989. Renamed Crack o Dawn. Now in unaltered condition as AMiTy, at Whitby, December 2025.
964	The Baltic Exchange	1962	1962–1988	Salcombe	1973	(Note: Gift of the Baltic Exchange LB fund, built by J. Samuel White of Cowes, costing £36,500. Added airbag for self-righting.); Capsized on service, but righted by air-bag, 10 April 1983. Sold 1989. Renamed Baltic Air. Last reported as fire damaged at Blyth, Northumberland, February 2025.
965	Louisa Anne Hawker	1962	1962–1986	Appledore	1975	(Note: Gift of Mr Hawker, built by Groves & Guttridge of Cowes, costing £40,000. Added airbag for self-righting.)Sold August 1987. Renamed Lord Hurcomb. Last reported in unaltered condition as Louisa Anne Hawker at Miri, Sarawak, Malaysia, November 2019.
969	William Myers and Sarah Jane Myers	1963	1963–1990	Sunderland	1975	(Note: Legacy of Miss Myers, plus RNLI funds, built by J. Samuel White of Cowes, costing £40,500. Modified to be inherently self-righting, 1975.) Sold in 1992. Renamed Blue Angel, later Doris. Last reported as D'ouwe Draeck on the River Vecht between Weesp and Muiden, Netherlands, July 2016.
969	William Myers and Sarah Jane Myers	1963	1990–1992	Relief fleet	1975	Sold in 1992. Renamed Blue Angel, later Doris. Last reported as D'ouwe Draeck on the River Vecht between Weesp and Muiden, Netherlands, July 2016.
970	Frederick Edward Crick	1963	1963–1986	Lowestoft	1968	(Note: Legacy of Mrs Crick, built by J. Samuel White of Cowes, costing £40,500. Added airbag for self-righting.) Sold October 1986. Renamed Helen Christina, Surf Rescue, and Beluga. In storage as Frederick Edward Crick on the River Yonne, Migennes, France, Dec 2024.
971	Joseph Soar (Civil Service No.34)	1963	1963–1985	St Davids	1977	(Note: Gift of the Civil Service LB fund, built by J. Samuel White of Cowes, costing £40,500. Modified to be inherently self-righting, 1977.) Sold August 1992. Renamed City of Bristol. Now in unaltered condition as Joseph Soar at Coleraine, Northern Ireland, December 2025.
971	Joseph Soar (Civil Service No.34)	1963	1986–1988	Dunbar	1977	Sold August 1992. Renamed City of Bristol. Now in unaltered condition as Joseph Soar at Coleraine, Northern Ireland, December 2025.
971	Joseph Soar (Civil Service No.34)	1963	1988–1990	Shoreham Harbour	1977	Sold August 1992. Renamed City of Bristol. Now in unaltered condition as Joseph Soar at Coleraine, Northern Ireland, December 2025.

== See also ==
- Royal National Lifeboat Institution lifeboats
