= Appledore Lifeboat Station =

Lifeboat station in Devon, England

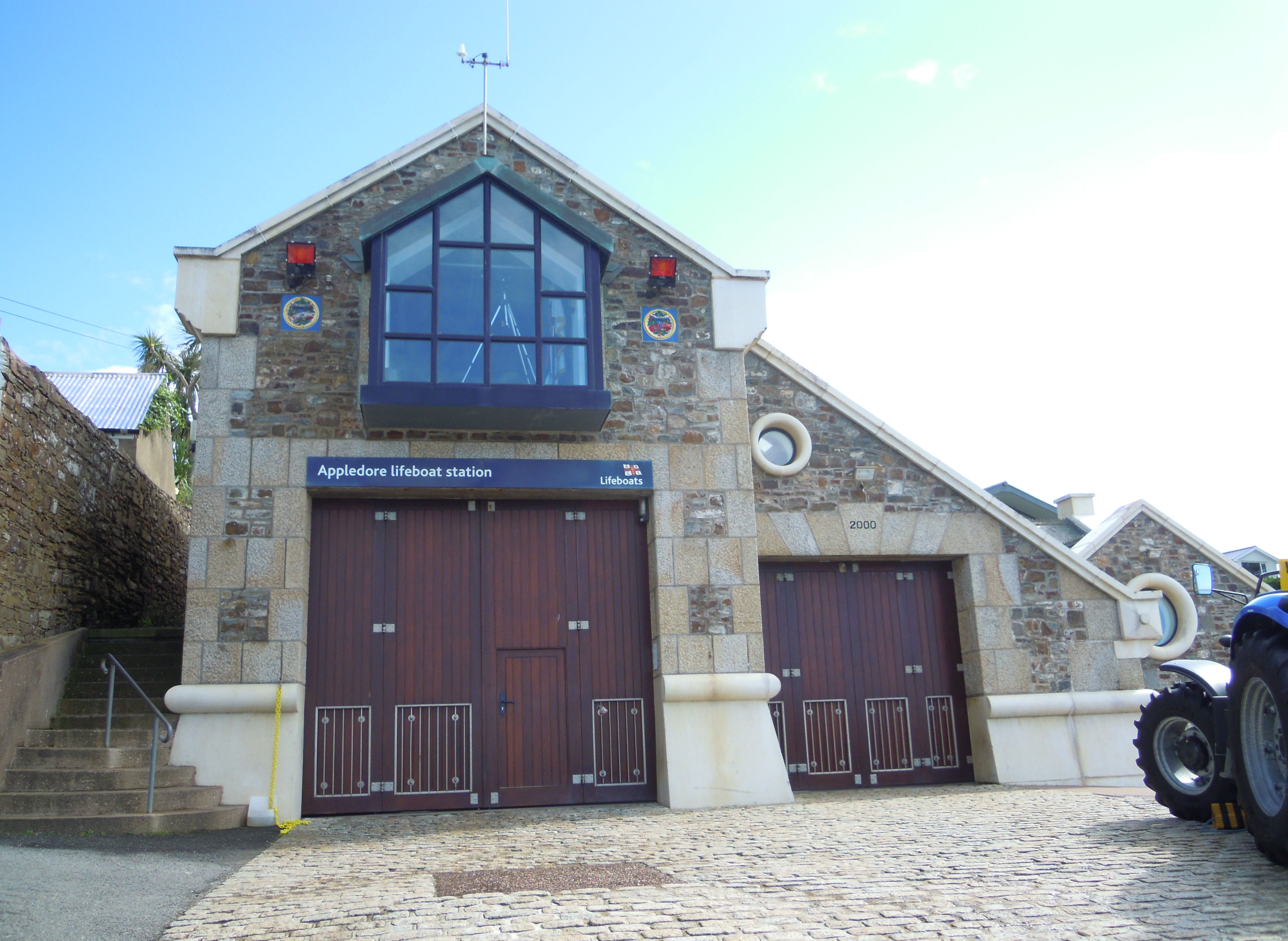
- Appledore Lifeboat Station

- Location within Devon
- Alternative names: Appledore and Bideford

General information
- Type: Lifeboat station
- Location: Jubilee Road, Appledore, EX39 1SA, United Kingdom
- Coordinates: 51.057°N 4.199778°W
- Opened: First lifeboat 1825; Current building 2001
- Cost: £500,000
- Owner: Royal National Lifeboat Institution

Design and construction
- Architecture firm: Poynton Bradbury Wynter Cole

Website
- Appledore RNLI Lifeboat Station

Appledore Lifeboat Station can be found at the end of Irsha Street in Appledore, a village overlooking the confluence of the River Taw and the River Torridge, on the north-west coast of the county of Devon, in England.

A local committee established a lifeboat station at Appledore in 1825, operating the first lifeboat provided by the newly formed Royal National Institution for the Preservation of Life from Shipwreck (RNIPLS). From 1831, the station was managed by the North Devon Humane Society. The present station, operated by the Royal National Lifeboat Institution (RNLI), opened in 2001.

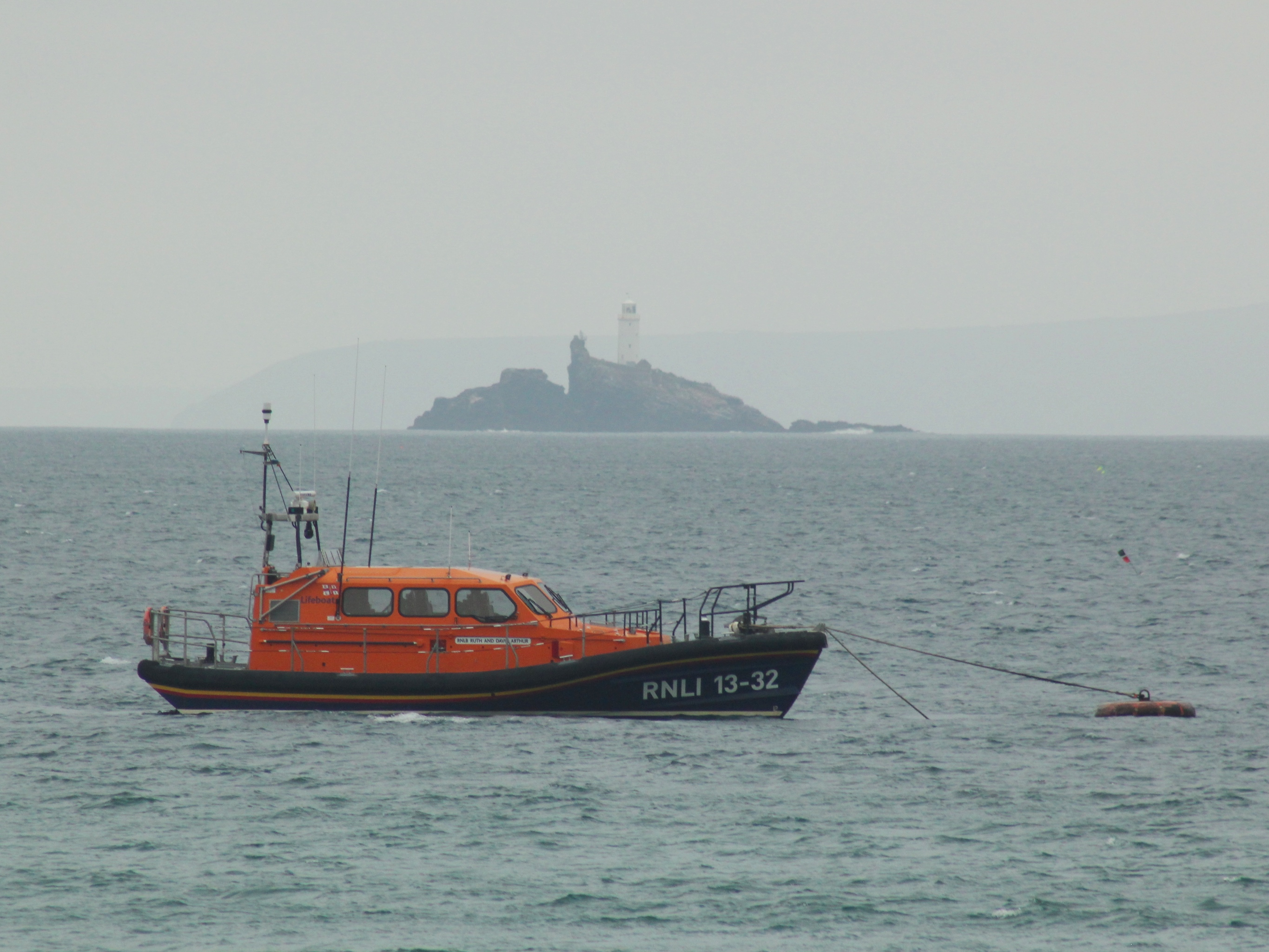
Shannon-class lifeboat 13-32 Ruth and David Arthur (ON 1339)

The station currently operates a Shannon-class All-weather lifeboat (ALB), 13-32 Ruth and David Arthur (ON 1339), on station since 2026, and a B-class (Atlantic 85) Inshore lifeboat (ILB), Glanely (B-861), on station since 2012.

== History ==
The recently formed Royal National Institution for the Preservation of Life from Shipwreck (RNIPLS), as the RNLI was known at the time, was petitioned in August 1824, to provide a lifeboat for the Bideford area. An 18 ft (5.5 m) lifeboat built by William Plenty of Newbury, Berkshire, the Volunteer, arrived towards the end of February 1825 and was initially kept in a barn at Appledore, but in 1829, was moved into the nearby King's Watch House.

A meeting was called in Northam on 20 June 1831, which established the North Devon Humane Society. Their first aim was to build a boathouse and provide a carriage for the lifeboat, so that it could be taken to wherever it was most suitable to launch for each rescue.

The new boathouse was completed in Watertown by the end of the year, which put the lifeboat half a mile nearer the sea than before. This building was large enough for two boats and a second larger 26 ft (7.9 m) lifeboat named Assistance arrived in December 1831. On 24 November 1833, Assistance capsized after launching to the aid of the ship Mary Ann, on passage from Puerto Cabello, Venezuela to Liverpool, Lancashire, when she was driven ashore at Bideford and wrecked. One lifeboat man made it ashore, and four more were rescued by the Volunteer, but three were lost, as were all hands off the Mary Ann.

A new appeal was made in the area in 1846 to buy a third, larger, lifeboat and £125 was raised. The RNIPLS suggested they buy a boat similar to one recently provide to the Admiralty at Harwich. The new boat, Petrel, arrived at the Watertown boathouse in October 1847. It proved too heavy to be used head-on to heavy seas and was prone to taking on too much water so was sent back to builder in 1850 for alterations. A second boathouse was built in 1848 at Braunton Burrows, on the north side of the estuary, and the Assistance was relocated there. The new station was needed to make it easier to reach ships in trouble on that side of the estuary but the crews always came from Appledore.

The distance from the Watertown boathouse to Bideford Bar, where most wrecks occurred, proved to be a problem, and so another boathouse was built at Northam Burrows to the west of Appledore in 1851, partly funded by the RNIPLS. The North Devon Humane Society was wound up in 1855 and became a local branch of the RNLI. The Northam Burrows boathouse was expanded to house a second boat in 1856 and became the main station; the old boat house at Watertown was closed.

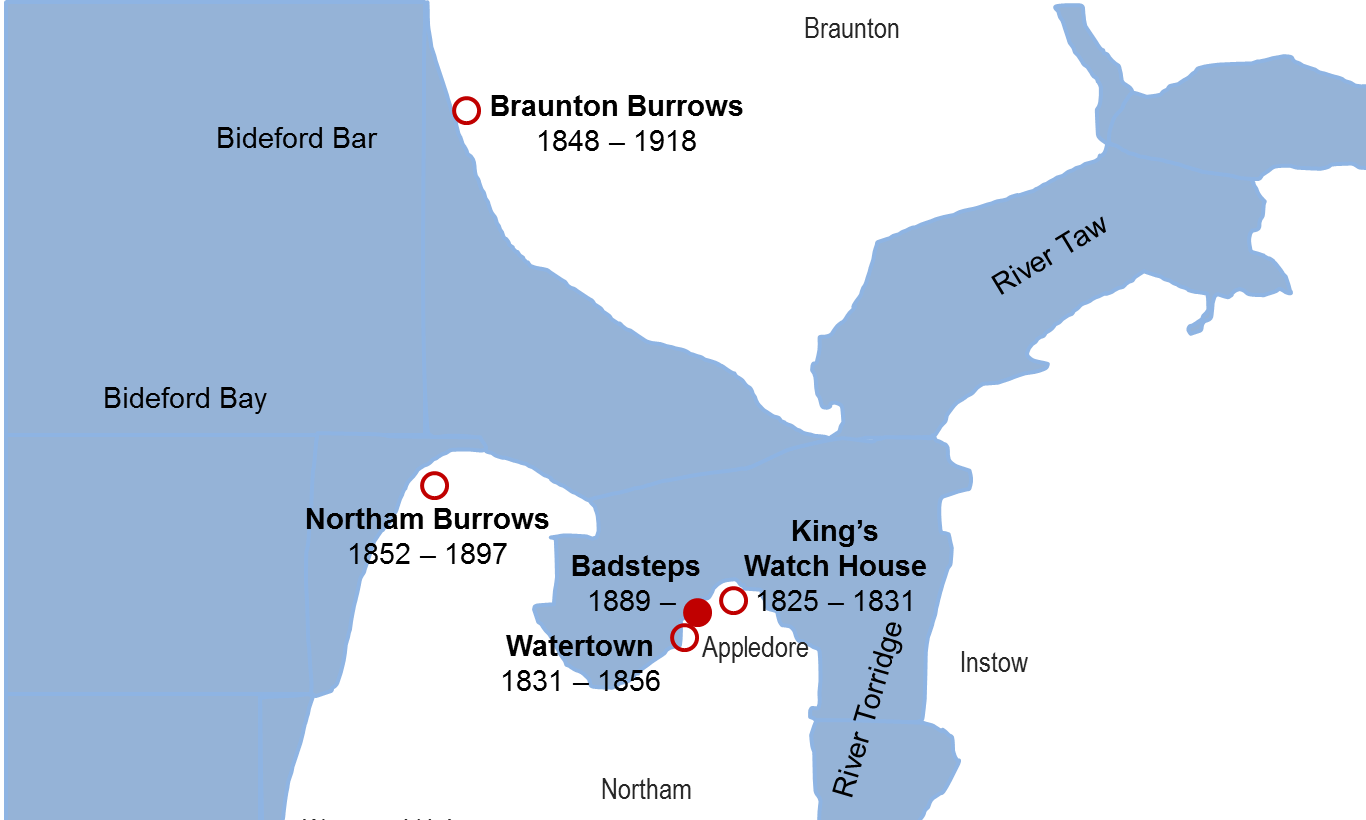
Locations of the lifeboat stations

The two stations were close to the Bideford Bar but remote from Appledore where the crews lived. With the development of boats that could be more easily sailed (rather than just rowed) a new boat house was built in 1889 at Badsteps in Appledore, to replace the station at Northam Burrows. During World War I, it became difficult to find the horses and men necessary for launching boats at Braunton Burrows, so it too was closed temporarily in 1918, becoming a permanent closure the following year.

The first motor lifeboat arrived on station in 1922. In 1938, a 46-foot Watson-class lifeboat, the Violet Armstrong (ON 815), was placed on service, but was moored afloat, as it did not fit in the boathouse. The boathouse was then used to accommodate a small boarding boat, used to ferry the crew out to the lifeboat. The new lifeboat had a shallower draught than usual for a Watson class, and also had her stern strengthened, both modifications to help crossing the shallow water at the mouth of the estuary. In 1947, it was the first lifeboat to be fitted with a radio which could also be used as loudhailer, making it easier for the crew to communicate with other vessels.

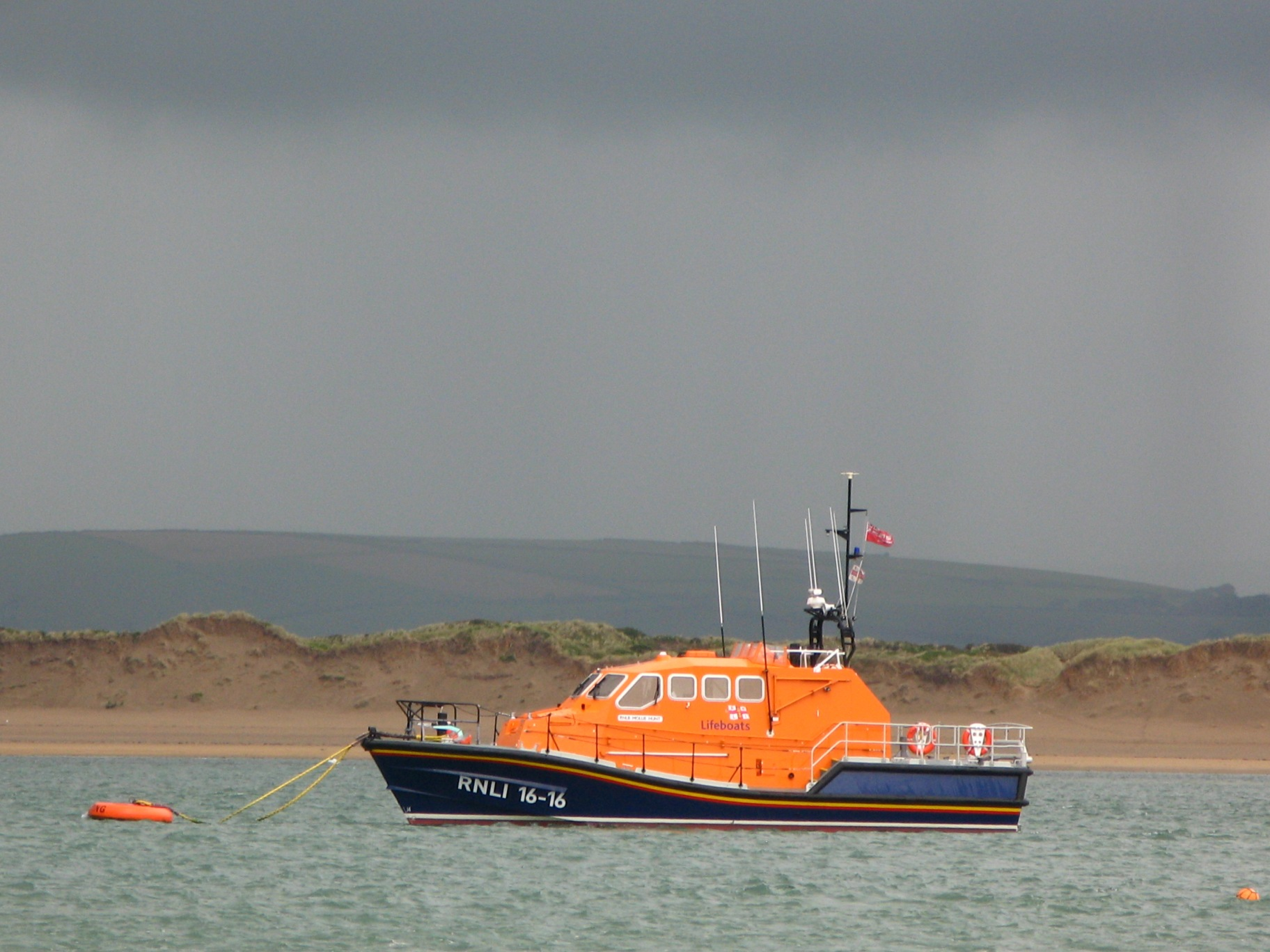
Tamar-class lifeboat 16-16 Mollie Hunt (ON 1296)

An Inshore lifeboat has been stationed at Appledore since 1972, and is kept in the boathouse with the boarding boat. The boathouse had a new crew room installed at first-floor level in 1980, but the whole building was demolished in 2000, and a new station opened the following year. The new station building was designed by Poynton Bradbury Wynter Cole, costing £500,000. Philip Cole, one of the firm's partners, said the building's design reflects "the traditional form of early lifeboat houses" and would be made from local stone.

On 2 October 2025, the RNLI announced that following a national review of service calls, the Tamar-class lifeboat at Appledore, 16-16 Mollie Hunt (ON 1296), was to be reallocated to a different station in 2026/27, and be replaced with a Shannon-class All-weather lifeboat.

13-32 Ruth and David Arthur (ON 1339) arrived on station on 1 May 2026, and entered service at 13:32 on 15 June 2026.

== Building descriptions ==
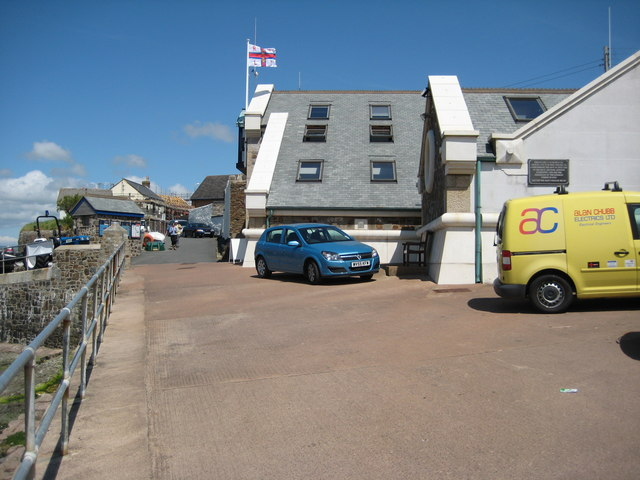
The lifeboat station from the west

The first boathouse at Watertown was built in stone just above the high water line. It was 34 by 16 feet (10.4 by 4.9 m) with a door that was just 8 ft 3 in (2.51 m) wide. The Braunton Burrows boathouse of 1848 was built in wood 1 mi (1.6 km) north of the lighthouse at Airy Point. It was the same size as the one at Watertown, 34 by 16 ft (10.4 by 4.9 m), but with a 13 ft (4.0 m) doorway.

The present lifeboat station is situated off Jubilee Road. At ground level, facing a slipway, is covered accommodation for the ILB, boarding boat and their tractors. Additional crew facilities are located in the attic above.

== Area of operation ==
The boathouse at Appledore faces the estuary formed by the confluence of two rivers. When lifeboats were first stationed here, there were busy ports at Barnstaple on the River Taw and Bideford on the River Torridge. The estuary flows westwards over the shallows at Bideford Bar into Bideford Bay. Much of the coast is lined by sand dunes, the 'burrows' where the auxiliary stations were built.

The RNLI aims to reach any casualty up to 50 nmi (93 km) from its stations within two hours in good weather. To do this, the Shannon-class lifeboat has an operating range of 250 nmi (460 km), and a top speed of 27 knots (50 km/h). Adjacent lifeboats are at Ilfracombe to the north, and to the south is an Inshore lifeboat at Clovelly, and an All-weather lifeboat at Padstow.

== Service awards ==
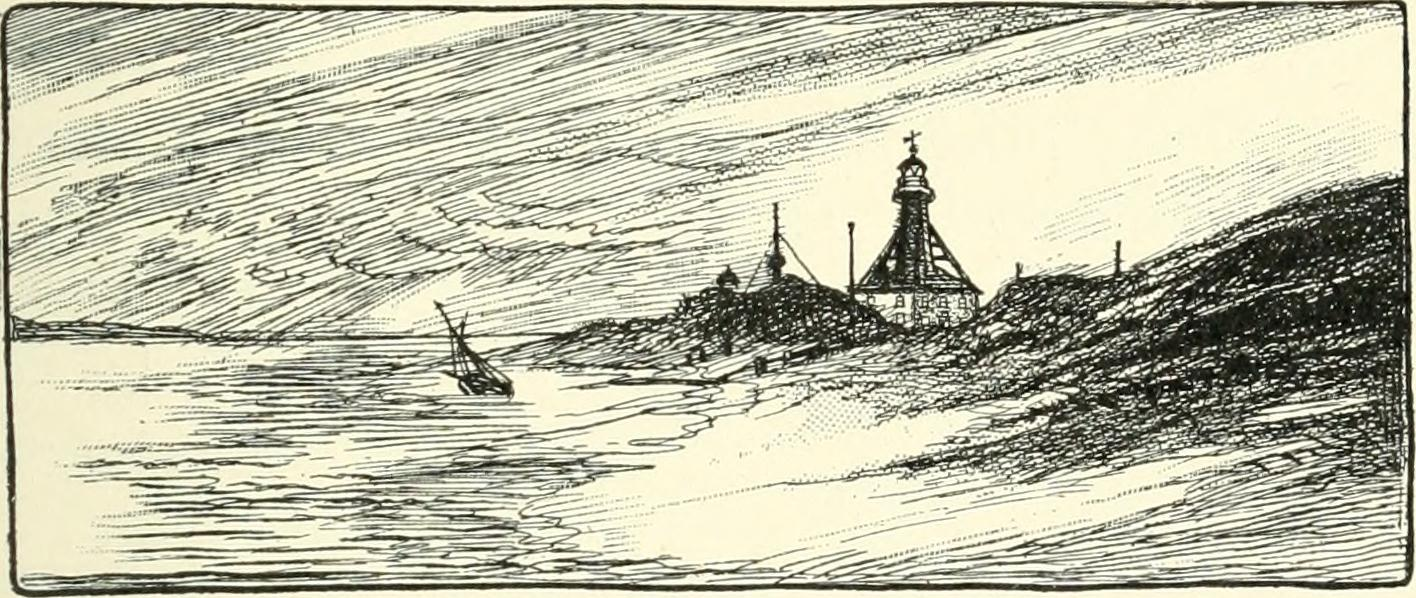
The lighthouse on Braunton Burrows was built to guide boats over Bideford Bar and into the estuary

The Volunteer lifeboat launched on 11 September 1829 and rescued 12 people from the packet boat Daniel of Bristol, although it took two trips to complete the rescue. RNIPLS Silver Medal was awarded to Owen Smith, William Brinksmead and Philip Guy for their part in this service.

1833 was a busy and tragic year. Assistance was used on 6 March to save nine people from a wrecked brig, when a storm blew up during salvage work. On 24 November, it was taken out to aid the Mary Ann, which had run aground in the night. No signs of life were seen, so the lifeboat returned to shore. Movement in the rigging caused a second crew to return took the wreck but three drowned when it capsized. There were no survivors from the Mary Ann. The smaller lifeboat Volunteer was launched and brought the lifeboat and its survivors ashore. Both the lifeboats were launched on 17 December 1833 and saved 18 people from the Elizabeth of Liverpool. These three rescues saw five people awarded silver medals: William Chappell, Thomas Burnard (the Humane Society's secretary), Thomas Chappell, Thomas Tuckfield, and Henry Popham.

Thomas Day received a silver medal for leading the crew of the Volunteer when they rescued six people from the schooner Henrietta on 29 November 1836. Both lifeboats were involved in another silver medal service just before Christmas in 1845. Eight people, half of the crew of the wrecked barque Ness, were saved on 23 December. This medal was awarded to Joshua Williams who received a second silver award, and John Marshall his first, when they rescued four of the five crew from the Dasher which was wrecked on 23 March 1850.

28 December 1868 was a day of bad storms off the Devon coast. Two boats were seen to be in difficulties in Bideford Bay. The Hope was taken out of the boathouse at Northam Burrows and taken along the shore as the Austrian barque Pace tried to get out to sea to no avail. When it was blown aground, the lifeboat was launched into seas so heavy that at times it was vertical. After getting nine people onto the lifeboat, it was dashed against the wreck and lost its rudder. It got back to shore and, after landing the rescued people, put to sea again with fresh crew but had to steer with an oar instead of the rudder. It failed to reach the Pace this time and returned to the beach after it capsized and lost all but three of its oars. The volunteers were prepared to make a third attempt but the tide was now low enough that the remaining crew could be brought off the wreck without a boat. Joseph Cox, the coxswain who had been injured during the first attempt, was awarded a silver medal by the RNLI. He and the two others who gone out both times the lifeboat launched (his son Joseph Cox Junior and John Kelly) each received the Silver Cross of Merit from The Emperor of Austria. Another volunteer, David Johns, who had survived the first attempt to save the Pace, was drowned later that day, while trying to take a rope out to the Leopard which had run aground further down the coast.

Coxswain James Smallridge received a silver medal for rescuing seven people from the Nigretta, after it ran aground at Braunton Sands in a gale on 5 November 1871. There was then a gap of more than 60 years before the next medal was awarded at Appledore. George Pow, the second coxswain, was given a bronze medal for taking the lifeboat into heavy seas to rescue the three people on board the fishing boat Lee Bay on 11 January 1935.

Sidney Cann was Appledore's most decorated crew member. He joined the crew in about 1912, became the lifeboat's bowman in 1922, promoted to second coxswain in 1931 and then coxswain in 1933. He retired in 1965. He was awarded a bronze medal for a wartime rescue. A concrete caisson that would become part of a breakwater was being towed to France on the 18 October 1944 but the tow broke in heavy seas. The Appledore lifeboat was sent to take the seven crew off although the caisson's position was uncertain. He took part in a second bronze-award service on 13 November 1949 when the Monte Gurugu sank off Lundy Island. This was a Spanish ship and he was also awarded the silver medal of the Spanish Society for Saving the Shipwrecked. Next, he was accorded the 'Thanks of the Institution inscribed on Vellum' after attending the steamship Gilwice of Poland on 13 November 1959. He was finally awarded the RNLI silver medal, after the Louisa Ann Hawker was launched into a northerly gale on 17 November 1962, to assist the Royal Fleet Auxiliary tanker Green Ranger, which had broken free from her tug and run aground on rocks near Hartland Point. While the lifeboat found the ship they could not find any of her crew. The lifeboat stood by for some time until it became clear that the crew had already been saved by breeches buoy. Cann was awarded the British Empire Medal in 1964.

Bronze medals were awarded to second coxswain John Bowden, for rescuing four people from the yacht Volunteer, which ran aground on 11 September 1964, and to ILB helm John Pavitt, for rescuing a paddle boarder in a gale on 1 December 1985. Pavitt was also presented with the 'Thanks of the Institution inscribed on Vellum', when he was Helm of the lifeboat, that took Dr Valentine to attend an injured person on the MV Manchester Merit. The doctor had great difficulty in boarding the ship due to the 15 ft (4.6 m) swell and also received the 'Thanks of the Institution inscribed on Vellum'.

The Tyne-class lifeboat George Gibson (ON 1140) put to sea on 31 March 1994, when the local fishing boat Torridge Warrior was struggling through a gale with just one of its engines working. The lifeboat reached the boat on the seaward side of the Bideford Bar but, due to the state of the tide and weather, had to tow the boat to Ilfracombe. The tow line broke but was reconnected. The Ilfracombe lifeboat arrived and took over the tow but the Appledore boat continued to escort them. They then had to wait three hours for sufficient water to enter Ilfracombe harbour. Coxswain Michael Bowden was awarded a bronze medal for his seamanship that afternoon.

Helm Gary Stanbury was presented with a bronze medal, for taking the ILB out after dark on 22 January 2005. The crew saved three people from a power boat that was in trouble on Bideford Bar. This also attracted the 'Walter and Elizabeth Groombridge Award', for the most outstanding inshore lifeboat rescue of the year.

=== Non-crew awards ===
Awards are also made to people who are not members of the lifeboat or shore crews. One example being the silver medal awarded to Thomas Jones, the captain of the Cardiff steam tug Ely, which went to the aid of the Wool Packet which ran aground on Bideford Bar during a strong gale on 21 September 1861.

Robert Cann, the 10-year old grand-nephew of lifeboat coxswain Sidney Cann, had just rowed to the lifeboat station on 16 August 1955, when he heard two young swimmers shouting for help nearby. He took his boat out again and got the boys on board. Because of the tide, he had to row across to the opposite shore where he dragged it against the tide for a distance and then rowed back across to Appledore with the tide. The RNLI, on hearing about the rescue, awarded him with a wristwatch, making him the youngest person to have been recognised by the Institution.

A similar award was made six years later. On this occasion Richard Bowden, the 13-year old nephew of the lifeboat's second coxswain John Bowden, rowed his dinghy out to a girl who was in difficulties on 18 July 1861. Unable to get on board, she clung onto the dinghy, while he rowed it back to shore.

== Station honours ==
The following are awards made at Appledore:

- RNIPLS Silver Medal
  Owen Nile Riordon Smith, Master Mariner – 1829
  William Brinksmead, Master Mariner – 1829
  Philip Guy, Master Mariner – 1829
  Capt. William Chappell, Master Mariner – 1833
  Thomas Tuckfield – 1834
  Thomas Chappell – 1834
  Henry Popham – 1834
  Thomas Burnard, Honorary Secretary, North Devon Humane Society – 1834
  Thomas Day, Coxswain (Bideford) – 1836
  Thomas Burnard, Honorary Secretary, North Devon Humane Society – 1840 (Second-Service clasp)
  Capt. Joshua Williams, Coxswain (Bideford) – 1846
  Capt. John Marshall – 1850
  Capt. Joshua Williams – 1850 (Second-Service clasp)
- RNLI Silver Medal
  Joseph Cox Sr., Coxswain (Appledore) – 1861
  Capt. Thomas Jones of the Steam Tug 'Ely' – 1866
  Joseph Cox Sr., Coxswain (Second-Service clasp) – 1869
  Joseph Cox Sr., Coxswain (Third-Service clasp) – 1869
  Joseph Cox Jr., Second Coxswain – 1869
  John Moulton Kelly, crew member – 1869
  James Harvey Smallridge, Coxswain (Braunton) – 1872
  James Harvey Smallridge, Coxswain (Braunton) – 1891 (Second-Service clasp)
  Joseph Cox Jr., Coxswain (Appledore) – 1891 (Second-Service clasp)
  Sidney Cann, Coxswain – 1963
- Silver Cross of Merit, awarded by The Emperor of Austria
  Joseph Cox Sr., Coxswain – 1869
  Joseph Cox Jr., Second Coxswain – 1869
  John Moulton Kelly, crew member – 1869
- Silver Medal, awarded by The Spanish Society for Saving the Shipwrecked
  Sidney Cann, Coxswain – 1949
- RNLI Bronze Medal
  George Henry Eastman Pow, Second Coxswain – 1935
  Sidney Cann, Coxswain – 1944
  Sidney Cann, Coxswain – 1950 (Second-Service clasp)
  John Richard Bowden, Second Coxswain – 1964
  John William Pavitt, Helm – 1986
  Michael Bowden, Coxswain – 1995
  Gary Stanbury, Helm – 2005
- The Walter and Elizabeth Groombridge Award 2005
  (for the outstanding inshore lifeboat rescue of the year)
  Gary Stanbury, Helm – 2005
- The Thanks of the Institution inscribed on Vellum
  Sidney Cann, Coxswain – 1959
  Dr D. F. Valentine – 1971
  John William Pavitt, crew member – 1971
- Diplomas awarded by The Spanish Society for Saving the Shipwrecked
  Each of the Appledore crew – 1949
- Wrist Watch
  Robert Cann, aged 10 – 1956
  Richard Bowden, aged 13 – 1961
- Names added to the Book of Valour of the British Medical Association
  Dr Brook – 1966
  Dr Ruddock – 1966
- British Empire Medal
  Sidney Cann, Coxswain – 1964QBH
- Appledore Citizen of the Year
  Martin Cox, Coxswain – 2025

== Roll of honour ==
In memory of those lost whilst serving at Appledore:

- Lost when the lifeboat Assistance capsized, on service to the ship Mary Ann, 24 November 1833.
  Samuel Blackmore
  John Peake
  Benjamin Pile
- Drowned whilst attempting to swim with a rope to the barque Leopard, 28 December 1868
  David Johns, crewman (36)

== Appledore Lifeboats ==
=== Appledore (Watertown) (1825–1856) ===
| On station | ON (Note: ON is the RNLI's Official Number of the boat.) | Name | Built | Class | Comments |
|---|---|---|---|---|---|
| 1825–1856 | Pre-105 | Volunteer | 1825 | 28-foot Plenty | (Note: 18 ft 0 in (5.49 m) x 6 ft 3 in (1.91 m) (4/6-oared) Plenty-class non-self-righting lifeboat, funded by the RNIPLS, built by William Plenty of Newbury, Berkshire, costing £90.) |
| 1831–1848 | Pre-150 | Assistance | 1831 | 26-foot Palmer | (Note: 26 ft 0 in (7.92 m) x 6 ft 0 in (1.83 m) (6-oared) Palmer-class non-self-righting lifeboat, funded by the RNIPLS, built by Harton of Limehouse, and Taylor of Blackwall, London, costing £57.); Transferred to Braunton Burrows in 1848 |
| 1847–1851 | Pre-222 | Petrel | 1847 | 28-foot Whale Boat | (Note: 28 ft 0 in (8.53 m) x 7 ft 6 in (2.29 m) (6-oared) non-self-righting whale boat, funded by the RNIPLS, built by Thompson of Rotherhithe, costing £125.); Believe transferred to Northam Burrows around 1851. |

Pre ON numbers are unofficial numbers used by the Lifeboat Enthusiasts' Society to reference early lifeboats not included on the official RNLI list.

=== Braunton Burrows (1848–1919) ===
Approx Coordinates:51°05′00.6″N 4°13′08.6″W

| On station | ON | Name | Built | Class | Comments |
|---|---|---|---|---|---|
| 1848–1857 | Pre-150 | Assistance | 1831 | 26-foot Palmer | |
| 1857–1866 | Pre-315 | Dolphin | 1857 | 28-foot Self-righting (P&S) | (Note: 28 ft 0 in (8.53 m) x 6 ft 0 in (1.83 m) (6-oared) Peake-class self-righting (P&S) lifeboat, funded by the RNIPLS, built by Forrestt of Limehouse, London, costing £131.); Broken up in 1867. |
| 1866–1881 | Pre-462 | George and Catherine | 1866 | 32-foot Prowse Self-righting (P&S) | (Note: 32 ft 0 in (9.75 m) x 7 ft 8 in (2.34 m) (10-oared) Prowse-class self-righting (P&S) lifeboat, gift of Mr and Mrs G. Jeremy of Axminster, built by Forrestt of Limehouse, London, costing £248.) |
| 1881–1902 | 213 | Robert and Catherine | 1881 | 34-foot Self-righting (P&S) | (Note: 34 ft 0 in (10.36 m) x 8 ft 0 in (2.44 m) (10-oared) self-righting (P&S) lifeboat, gift of Miss Leicester of Bayswater, built by Woolfe of Shadwell, London, costing £363.); Sold in 1902 |
| 1902–1911 | 485 | Robert and Catherine | 1902 | 34-foot Dungeness (Rubie) Self-righting (P&S) | (Note: 34 ft 0 in (10.36 m) x 8 ft 0 in (2.44 m) (10-oared) Dungeness-class (Rubie) self-righting (P&S) lifeboat, gift of Miss Leicester of Bayswater, built by Thames Ironworks of Blackwall, London, costing £619.); Capsized 21 December 1911, then used for demonstration purposes. Later at Holyhead. |
| 1912–1919 | 632 | Robert and Catherine | 1912 | 36-foot Self-righting (P&S) | (Note: 36 ft 0 in (10.97 m) x 8 ft 3 in (2.51 m) (10-oared) self-righting (P&S) lifeboat, gift of Miss Leicester of Bayswater, built by Thames Ironworks of Blackwall, London, costing £953.); Sold in 1922 |

=== Appledore (Northam Burrows No.1) (1851–1897) ===
Approx Coordinates:51°03′49.4″N 4°13′17.6″W

| On station | ON | Name | Built | Class | Comments |
|---|---|---|---|---|---|
| 1851–1852 | Pre-222 | Petrel | 1847 | 28-foot Whale Boat | Previously at Appledore Watertown. Sold as a ships boat in 1854. |
| 1852–1861 | Pre-253 | Petrel | 1852 | 30-foot Peake Self-righting (P&S) | (Note: 30 ft 0 in (9.14 m) x 8 ft 0 in (2.44 m) (12-oared) Peake-class self-righting (P&S) lifeboat, funded by the RNIPLS, built by Wallis of Blackwall, London, costing £100.); Broken up in 1861. |
| 1862–1890 | Pre-399 | Hope | 1862 | 34-foot Peake Self-righting (P&S) | (Note: 34 ft 0 in (10.36 m) x 7 ft 1 in (2.16 m) (6-oared) Peake-class self-righting (P&S) lifeboat, gift of Miss E. Hope of Bideford, built by Forrestt of Limehouse, London, costing £197.); Condemned in 1891. |
| 1891–1897 | 323 | Bessie Pearce | 1891 | 34-foot Self-righting (P&S) | (Note: 34 ft 0 in (10.36 m) x 7 ft 6 in (2.29 m) (10-oared) self-righting (P&S) lifeboat, legacy of Mrs A. Love of Dublin, built by Wm. T. Ellis of Lowestoft, costing £284.); Sold in 1898. |

=== Appledore (Northam Burrows No. 2) (1856–1862, 1870–1889) ===
Approx Coordinates:51°03′49.4″N 4°13′17.6″W

| On station | ON | Name | Built | Class | Comments |
|---|---|---|---|---|---|
| 1856–1862 | Pre-302 | Mermaid | 1856 | 28-foot Peake Self-righting (P&S) | (Note: 28 ft 0 in (8.53 m) x 6 ft 0 in (1.83 m) (6-oared) Peake-class self-righting (P&S) lifeboat, funded by local subscription, built by Forrestt of Limehouse, London, costing £131.); Transferred to Kingsgate. |
| 1870–1875 | Pre-552 | Mary Ann | 1870 | 30-foot Peake Self-righting (P&S) | (Note: 30 ft 0 in (9.14 m) x 6 ft 0 in (1.83 m) (6-oared) Peake-class self-righting (P&S) lifeboat, gift of Col. Beauchamp-Walker of London, built by Forrestt of Limehouse, London, costing £210.); Given to the French Lifeboat Society in 1878. |
| 1875–1885 | Pre-508 | Mary Ann | 1867 | 30-foot Peake Self-righting (P&S) | (Note: 30 ft 0 in (9.14 m) x 6 ft 7 in (2.01 m) (6-oared) Peake-class self-righting (P&S) lifeboat, gift of Col. Beauchamp-Walker of London, built by Forrestt of Limehouse, London, costing £210.); Previously Undaunted at Chichester Harbour. Broken up in 1885. |
| 1885–1889 | 175 | Jane Hannah MacDonald | 1885 | 34-foot Self-righting (P&S) | (Note: 34 ft 0 in (10.36 m) x 7 ft 6 in (2.29 m) (10-oared) self-righting (P&S) lifeboat, gift of Mrs MacDonald of Brighton, built by Woolfe of Shadwell, London, costing £300.); Transferred to Appledore (Badsteps) when it opened in 1889. |

=== Appledore (Badsteps) (1889–present) ===
Approx Coordinates:51°03′25.2″N 4°11′59.2″W

==== Pulling and Sailing (P&S) lifeboats ====
| On station | ON | Name | Built | Class | Comments |
|---|---|---|---|---|---|
| 1889–1907 | 175 | Jane Hannah MacDonald | 1885 | 34ft 2in Self-righting (P&S) | Previously at Northam Burrows. |
| 1907–1910 | 348 | Jane Hannah MacDonald | 1893 | 34-foot Self-righting (P&S) | (Note: 34 ft 0 in (10.36 m) x 8 ft 0 in (2.44 m) (10-oared) self-righting (P&S) lifeboat, gift of Mrs MacDonald of Brighton, built by Forrestt of Limehouse, costing £423.); Previously Elinor Roget at Clovelly. Transferred to Criccieth. |
| 1910–1922 | 611 | Jane Hannah MacDonald | 1910 | 35-foot Self-righting (P&S) | (Note: 35 ft 0 in (10.67 m) x 8 ft 6 in (2.59 m) (10-oared) self-righting (P&S) lifeboat, gift of Mrs MacDonald of Brighton, built by Thames Ironworks of Blackwall, London, costing £931.); Later at Eastbourne. Sold in 1939, and was one of the Little Ships of Dunkirk. In storage pending restoration at Bideford, November 2025. |

==== Motor lifeboats ====
| On station | ON | Op. No. (Note: Op. No. is the RNLI's Operational Number of the boat or vehicle carried on the hull.) | Name | Built | Class | Comments |
|---|---|---|---|---|---|---|
| 1922–1938 | 675 | – | V. C. S. (Note: The V. C. S. was funded by combining three legacies, and the names appropriated by the donor. It carried a plaque which read 'The Ellen and James Vagg, The Sarah Sleemin, and The Cecilia Life-boat'.) | 1922 | 40-foot Self-righting (motor) | (Note: 40 ft 0 in (12.19 m) x 10 ft 6 in (3.20 m) self-righting (motor) lifeboat, legacies of Mr Vagg, Mr Sleemin and Miss Marshall, built by J. Samuel White of Cowes, costing £8,162.); Sold in 1945. Last reported as the yacht Fiducia in Jersey in 1971. |
| 1938–1962 | 815 | – | Violet Armstrong | 1938 | 46-foot Watson | Specially modified for the shallow waters at Appledore. Sold in 1962. Under restoration at Bristol, April 2025. |
| 1962–1986 | 965 | – | Louisa Ann Hawker | 1962 | 47-foot Watson | Sold in 1987. Last reported at Sarawak, November 2019. |
| 1986–1987 | 958 | – | Laura Moncur | 1961 | 47-foot Watson | Sold in 1988. Restored, at Blakeney, December 2025 |
| 1987–1988 | 950 | – | Kathleen Mary | 1959 | 47-foot Watson | Sold in 1990. As Katie May at Ellesmere Port boat museum, November 2024. |
| 1988–2010 | 1140 | 47-027 | George Gibson | 1988 | Tyne | Sold in 2013. As safety boat The John Faulding at Portishead Marina, April 2024. |
| 2010–2026 | 1296 | 16-16 | Mollie Hunt | 2010 | Tamar | Withdrawn to relief fleet, 15 June 2026 |
| 2026– | 1339 | 13-32 | Ruth and David Arthur | 2019 | Shannon | Arrived on station on 1 May 2026, and entered service at 13:32 on Monday 15 June 2026. |

More post-service details can be found on the respective lifeboat class pages.

==== Inshore lifeboats ====
| On station | Op. No. | Name | Class | Comments |
|---|---|---|---|---|
| 1972–1973 | B-500 | (Unnamed) | B-class (Atlantic 21) | The RNLI's first B-class lifeboat. |
| 1974–1986 | B-520 | Wildenrath Wizzer | B-class (Atlantic 21) | |
| 1986–1997 | B-565 | Manchester and District XXXII | B-class (Atlantic 21) | |
| 1997 | B-705 | Vera Skilton | B-class (Atlantic 75) | |
| 1997–2012 | B-742 | Douglas Paley | B-class (Atlantic 75) | |
| 2012– | B-861 | Glanely | B-class (Atlantic 85) | |
| 2022–2024 | D-729 | Eileen Mary George | D-class (IB1) | Boarding boat for the ALB crew but fitted for search and rescue work. Previously stationed at Blackpool from 2010. |

==== Launch and recovery tractors ====
| On station | Op. No. | Reg. No. | Type | Comments |
|---|---|---|---|---|
| 2000–2007 | TW44 | S193 RUJ | Talus MB-764 County | |
| 2007–2017 | TW15 | E592 WNT | Talus MB-764 County | |
| 2017– | TW10 | VEL 99X | Talus MB-764 County | |

== See also ==
- List of RNLI stations
- List of former RNLI stations
- Royal National Lifeboat Institution lifeboats
