= Y-class lifeboat =

Inshore lifeboat class of the RNLI

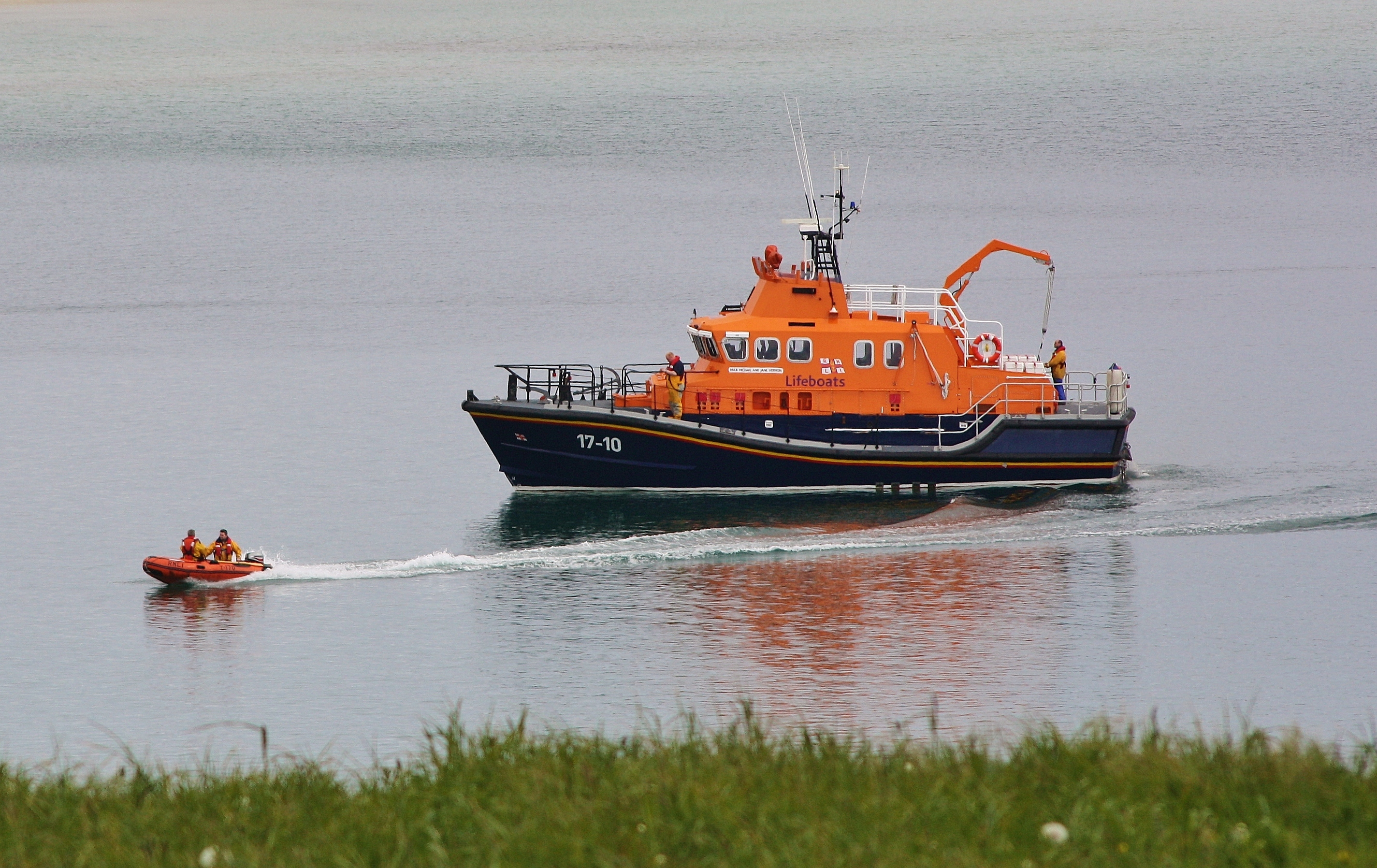
- Y-class lifeboat deployed from Severn-class All-weather lifeboat

Class overview
- Name: Y-class
- Operators: Royal National Lifeboat Institution

General characteristics
- Length: 3 m (9.8 ft)
- Propulsion: 1 × 15 hp (11 kW) outboard engine
- Speed: 25 knots (29 mph; 46 km/h)
- Range: Within visual range of ALB
- Complement: 2

The Y-class lifeboat is a class of small inflatable rescue boat, operated by the Royal National Lifeboat Institution (RNLI) of the United Kingdom and Ireland.

The Y-class is mainly used as a small tender carried on board the larger RNLI All-weather lifeboats. They were originally carried aboard the Arun-class lifeboats, but are now normally found on the Severn-class and Tamar-class lifeboats. They are also used as part of the RNLI's flood rescue team.

The lifeboat is powered by a single 15-hp outboard engine. It usually carries a crew of two and is primarily used for incidents where the casualty is near or on the shore, and where the larger All-weather lifeboat cannot get close in due to rocks or water depth.

Other small boats operated by the RNLI include the Arancia-class beach rescue boats, the X-class and the XP-class lifeboats.

All of the following fleet details are referenced to the 2004–2026 Lifeboat Enthusiast Society Handbooks, with information retrieved directly from RNLI records.

== Launching ==
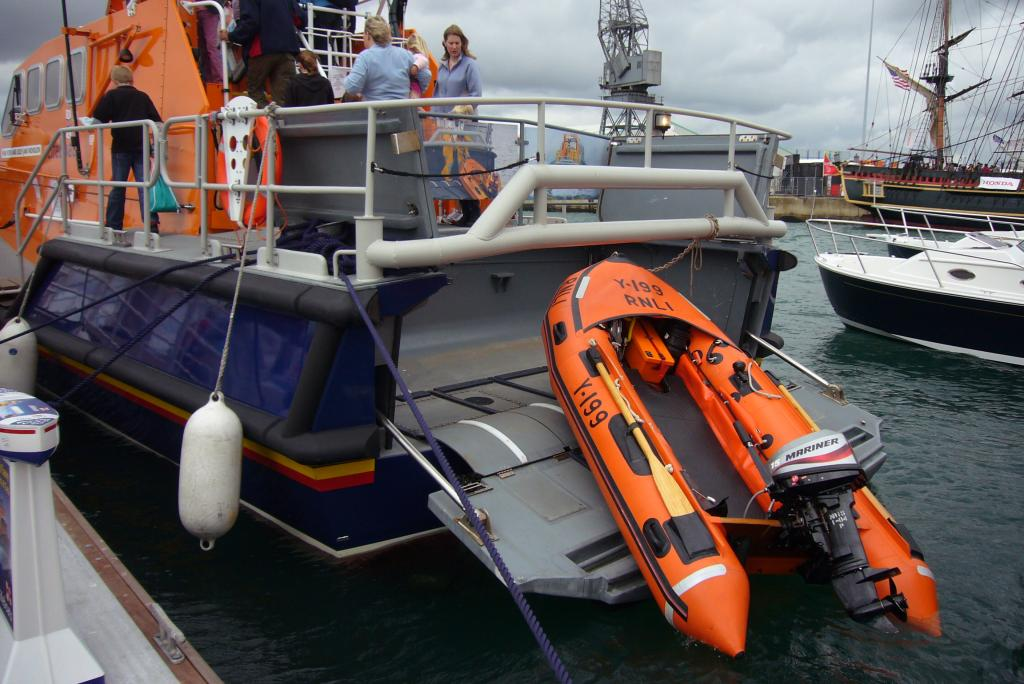
Y-class boat aboard a Tamar-class lifeboat

The Y-class lifeboat can be launched from a Severn-class All-weather lifeboat using the integral crane, or manually, depending on the fit-out of the Severn lifeboat.

On the Tamar-class All-weather lifeboat, the Y-class boat is housed in a built-in recessed chamber, within the stern section of the Tamar-class lifeboat. Access to this inflatable tender is achieved by lifting a section of deck and lowering a transom which doubles as a ramp. This allows the tender to be easily launched and recovered.

== Y-class fleet ==
Op. No. (Note: Op. No. is the RNLI's Operational Number of the boat carried on the hull.)	Host Lifeboat	Station	In service	Comments
Y-87	17-07 John and Margaret Doig	Valentia	2009	
Y-94	17-12 Edna Windsor	Barra Island	2009	
Y-96	52-38 City of Glasgow III	Troon	2003	
Y-96	17-09 City of London II	Dover	2004–2007	
Y-108	47-036 Kenneth Thelwall II	Walton and Frinton	2008–2009	
Y-113	17-19 Ernest and Mary Shaw	Campbeltown	2003–2007	
Y-114	52-39 Mickie Salvesen	Barry Dock	2004–2005	
Y-122	17-15 Bryan and Gordon	Ballyglass	2003–2007	
Y-128	17-06 David Kirkaldy	Aran Islands	2008–2009	
Y-131	17-10 Michael and Jane Vernon	Lerwick	2003–2007	
Y-132	17-25 Eric and Susan Hiscock (Wanderer)	Yarmouth (IOW)	2008–2009	
Y-132	17-03 Albert Brown	Harwich	2010	
Y-135	17-03 Albert Brown	Harwich	2008	
Y-136*	17-08 Helmut Schroder of Dunlossit II	Islay	2003–2007	
Y-136*	17-18 Tom Sanderson	Stornoway	2003–2007	
Y-137	52-45 Donald and Barbara Broadhead	Rosslare Harbour	2003	
Y-137	17-26 Henry Alston Hewat	Mallaig	2009	
Y-137	17-16 Violet Dorothy and Kathleen	Stromness	2010–2011	
Y-139	17-14 Charles Lidbury	Aith	2008–2009	
Y-141	17-04 Spirit of Guernsey	St Peter Port	2010	
Y-142	17-13 Margaret Foster	Kirkwall	2003–2007	
Y-142	17-36 Ivan Ellen	Penlee	2009	
Y-142	17-28 Alec and Christina Dykes	Torbay	2010–2011	
Y-143	17-11 The Whiteheads	St Mary's	2003–2007	
Y-143	17-24 Bon Accord	Aberdeen	2008	
Y-143	17-25 Eric and Susan Hiscock (Wanderer)	Yarmouth (IOW)	2010	
Y-145	17-26 Henry Alston Hewat	Mallaig	2008	
Y-147	52-43 The Queen Mother	Thurso	2003	
Y-149	17-15 Bryan and Gordon	Ballyglass	2008–2011	
Y-152	17-16 Violet Dorothy and Kathleen	Stromness	2003–2007	
Y-152	17-08 Helmut Schroder of Dunlossit II	Islay	2008–2009	
Y-153	17-13 Margaret Foster	Kirkwall	2008–2011	
Y-154	17-12 Edna Windsor	Barra Island	2003–2008	
Y-156	17-28 Alec and Christina Dykes	Torbay	2008–2009	
Y-157	17-30 William Gordon Burr	Portrush	2003–2007	
Y-157	17-22 Myrtle Maud	Arranmore	2009–	
Y-160	16-05 Helen Comrie	Longhope	2008	
Y-162	17-21 David and Elizabeth Acland	Newhaven	2008	
Y-163	17-03 Albert Brown	Harwich	2003–2007	
Y-163	17-20 Spirit of Northumberland	Tynemouth	2008–2010	
Y-164	17-24 Bon Accord	Aberdeen	2009–2024	
Y-165	52-36 Roy and Barbara Harding	Castletownbere	2003	
Y-166	17-20 Spirit of Northumberland	Tynemouth	2003–2007	
Y-166	17-42 The Taylors	Thurso	2014–	
Y-167	17-16 Violet Dorothy and Kathleen	Stromness	2008–2009	
Y-167	17-16 Violet Dorothy and Kathleen	Stromness	2012–2022	
Y-167	17-16 Violet Dorothy and Kathleen	Stromness	2024–	
Y-168	17-37 William Blannin	Buckie	2009–2010	
Y-168	17-09 City of London II	Dover	2014	
Y-168	17-43 Donald and Barbara Broadhead	Rosslare Harbour	2021–	
Y-169	17-14 Charles Lidbury	Aith	2003–2007	
Y-169	17-11 The Whiteheads	St Mary's	2008–2022	
Y-170	17-10 Michael and Jane Vernon	Lerwick	2008–2015	
Y-170	16-11 Mark Mason	Angle	2016–2019	
Y-171	17-32 Ernest and Mabel	Weymouth	2008–2013; 2015–2022	
Y-173	17-22 Myrtle Maud	Arranmore	2003–2008	
Y-174	17-05 Pride of the Humber	Humber	2003–2007	
Y-174	17-04 Spirit of Guernsey	St Peter Port	2008,	
Y-174	17-39 Elizabeth Fairlie Ramsey	Tobermory	2009	
Y-174	17-09 City of London II	Dover	2010	
Y-174	17-04 Spirit of Guernsey	St Peter Port	2011	
Y-174	17-21 David and Elizabeth Acland	Newhaven	2012	
Y-174	17-03 Albert Brown	Harwich	2019–	
Y-175	17-24 Bon Accord	Aberdeen	2003–2007	
Y-175	17-05 Pride of the Humber	Humber	2008–	
Y-176	17-25 Eric and Susan Hiscock (Wanderer)	Yarmouth (IOW)	2003–2007	
Y-176	17-40 Julian and Margaret Leonard	Lochinver	2008–2011	
Y-176	17-40 Julian and Margaret Leonard	Lochinver	2013–2021	
Y-176	17-40 Julian and Margaret Leonard	Lochinver	2023–	
Y-177	17-26 Henry Alston Hewat	Mallaig	2003–2007	
Y-177	17-32 Ernest and Mabel	Weymouth	2014	
Y-177	17-28 Alec and Christina Dykes	Torbay	2017	
Y-177	17-37 William Blannin	Buckie	2019–	
Y-178	17-07 John and Margaret Doig	Valentia	2003–2008	
Y-178	17-09 City of London II	Dover	2015–2021	
Y-178	16-09 Baltic Exchange III	Salcombe	2023–	
Y-179	17-09 City of London II	Dover	2008–2009	
Y-179	17-09 City of London II	Dover	2011–2013	
Y-179	16-19 Irene Muriel Rees	Walton and Frinton	2022–2023	
Y-180*	17-28 Alec and Christina Dykes	Torbay	2003–2007	
Y-180*	17-30 William Gordon Burr	Portrush	2008	
Y-180*	17-18 Tom Sanderson	Stornoway	2008	
Y-180*	17-42 The Taylors	Thurso	2009	
Y-181	17-29 Richard Cox Scott	Falmouth	2003–2007	
Y-181	17-44 Annette Hutton	Castletownbere	2008	
Y-181	17-35 Sybil Mullen Glover	Plymouth	2009–	
Y-182	52-28 Sir Max Aitken II	Longhope	2003	
Y-182	17-39 Elizabeth Fairlie Ramsey	Tobermory	2008	
Y-183	17-43 Donald and Barbara Broadhead	Rosslare Harbour	2011–2012	
Y-184	17-30 William Gordon Burr	Portrush	2009–2011	
Y-185	17-32 Ernest and Mabel	Weymouth	2003–2007	
Y-185	17-04 Spirit of Guernsey	St Peter Port	2009	
Y-185	17-04 Spirit of Guernsey	St Peter Port	2012–2023	
Y-186	17-18 Tom Sanderson	Stornoway	2009–2014	
Y-187	17-06 David Kirkaldy	Aran Islands	2003–2007	
Y-187	17-42 The Taylors	Thurso	2004–2008	
Y-187	17-42 The Taylors	Thurso	2010–2013	
Y-187	17-18 Tom Sanderson	Stornoway	2015–	
Y-188	17-35 Sybil Mullen Glover	Plymouth	2003–2007	
Y-188	17-21 David and Elizabeth Acland	Newhaven	2020–2021	
Y-188	16-16 Molly Hunt	Appledore	2024	
Y-188	16-17 Alfred Albert Williams	Bembridge	2025	
Y-189	17-37 William Blannin	Buckie	2008	
Y-189	17-37 William Blannin	Buckie	2016	
Y-189	17-25 Eric and Susan Hiscock (Wanderer)	Yarmouth (IOW)	2022–2023	
Y-189	–	Diverse Marine Ltd		
Y-189	17-04 Spirit of Guernsey	St Peter Port	2024–	
Y-190	17-36 Ivan Ellen	Penlee	2008	
Y-190	17-36 Ivan Ellen	Penlee	2010–2015	
Y-190	17-10 Michael and Jane Vernon	Lerwick	2016–2017	
Y-190	17-36 Ivan Ellen	Penlee	2017–2021	
Y-191	17-44 Annette Hutton	Castletownbere	2009–	
Y-192	17-39 Elizabeth Fairlie Ramsey	Tobermory	2010–2014	
Y-192	–	Yarmouth (IOW)		Spare not stored on any boat
Y-193	17-29 Richard Cox Scott	Falmouth	2008	
Y-193	17-20 Spirit of Northumberland	Tynemouth	2016–2020	
Y-194	17-41 Christopher Pearce	Holyhead	2004–2024	
Y-195	17-19 Ernest and Mary Shaw	Campbeltown	2008–	
Y-196	17-29 Richard Cox Scott	Falmouth	2009–2015	
Y-196	16-02 Haydn Miller	Tenby	2018–	
Y-197	17-43 Donald and Barbara Broadhead	Rosslare Harbour	2008–2010	
Y-197	17-43 Donald and Barbara Broadhead	Rosslare Harbour	2019–2020	
Y-198	17-03 Albert Brown	Harwich	2009	
Y-198	16-11 Mark Mason	Angle	2025–	
Y-199	17-35 Sybil Mullen Glover	Plymouth	2008	
Y-199	17-21 David and Elizabeth Acland	Newhaven	2009–2011	
Y-199	17-10 Michael and Jane Vernon	Lerwick	2018	
Y-200	16-05 Helen Comrie	Longhope	2009–	
Y-201	16-04 Spirit of Padstow	Padstow	2009–2018	
Y-201	17-40 Julian and Margaret Leonard	Lochinver	2022	
Y-201	17-25 Eric and Susan Hiscock (Wanderer)	Yarmouth (IOW)	2024–	
Y-202	16-02 Haydn Miller	Tenby	2007–2008	
Y-202	17-14 Charles Lidbury	Aith	2010–	
Y-203	16-03 The Misses Robertson of Kintail	Peterhead	2006–2008	
Y-203	16-02 Haydn Miller	Tenby	2009–2017	
Y-203	16-11 Mark Mason	Angle	2020–2024	
Y-204	16-04 Spirit of Padstow	Padstow	2007–2008	
Y-204	16-03 The Misses Robertson of Kintail	Peterhead	2009–2011	
Y-204	17-21 David and Elizabeth Acland	Newhaven	2013	
Y-204	17-39 Elizabeth Fairlie Ramsey	Tobermory	2015–2021	
Y-204	17-21 David and Elizabeth Acland	Newhaven	2022–	
Y-205	16-05 Helen Comrie	Longhope	2006–2007	
Y-205	16-03 The Misses Robertson of Kintail	Peterhead	2012–2018	
Y-205	17-09 City of London II	Dover	2023–	
Y-206	17-10 Michael and Jane Vernon	Lerwick	2019	
Y-206	17-34 Osier	Tynemouth	2021–	
Y-207	16-07 Lester	Cromer	2008–2019	
Y-207	17-21 David and Elizabeth Acland	Newhaven	2019	
Y-207	17-36 Ivan Ellen	Penlee	2022–	
Y-208	16-08 Grace Dixon	Barrow	2008–	
Y-209	16-09 Baltic Exchange III	Salcombe	2008–2011	
Y-209	16-09 Baltic Exchange III	Salcombe	2013–2022	
Y-209	17-11 The Whiteheads	St Mary's	2023–	
Y-210	16-10 Edward and Barbara Prigmore	Sennen Cove	2009	
Y-210	17-03 Albert Brown	Harwich	2011–2018	
Y-210	17-13 Margaret Foster	Kirkwall	2025–	
Y-211	16-11 Mark Mason	Angle	2009–2015	
Y-211	17-29 Richard Cox Scott	Falmouth	2019–2024	
Y-212	16-12 George Sullivan	St Helier	2009–2018	
Y-212	16-04 Spirit of Padstow	Padstow	2019–	
Y-213	16-14 City of London III	Sennen Cove	2010–	
Y-214	–	Falmouth Boat Co		
Y-215	16-16 Molly Hunt	Appledore	2010–2023	
Y-216	16-18 Killarney	Kilmore Quay	2010–2013	
Y-216	16-18 Killarney	Kilmore Quay	2015–	
Y-217	16-17 Alfred Albert Williams	Bembridge	2010–2024	
Y-218	16-15 Enid Collett	Shoreham Harbour	2010–2019	
Y-218	16-15 Enid Collett	Shoreham Harbour	2021–	
Y-219	16-19 Irene Muriel Rees	Walton and Frinton	2011–2016	
Y-219	16-12 George Sullivan	St Helier	2019–	
Y-220	17-26 Henry Alston Hewat	Mallaig	2010–2024	
Y-221	17-08 Helmut Schroder of Dunlossit II	Islay	2010–	
Y-222	17-13 Margaret Foster	Kirkwall	2012–2024	
Y-222	17-24 Bon Accord	Aberdeen	2025–	
Y-223	17-07 John and Margaret Doig	Valentia	2010–	
Y-224	17-06 David Kirkaldy	Aran Islands	2010–	
Y-225*	17-25 Eric and Susan Hiscock (Wanderer)	Yarmouth (IOW)	2011–2019	
Y-225*	16-19 Irene Muriel Rees	Walton and Frinton	2017–2018	
Y-225*	17-25 Eric and Susan Hiscock (Wanderer)	Yarmouth (IOW)	2021	
Y-226	16-09 Baltic Exchange III	Salcombe	2012	
Y-226	16-18 Killarney	Kilmore Quay	2014	
Y-226	16-24 John D Spicer	Porthdinllaen	2017	
Y-227	17-12 Edna Windsor	Barra Island	2010–	
Y-228	17-20 Spirit of Northumberland	Tynemouth	2011–2015	
Y-228	17-37 William Blannin	Buckie	2018	
Y-228	17-10 Michael and Jane Vernon	Lerwick	2020–	
Y-229	17-15 Bryan and Gordon	Ballyglass	2012–	
Y-230	17-25 Eric and Susan Hiscock (Wanderer)	Yarmouth (IOW)	2020	
Y-231	17-21 David and Elizabeth Acland	Newhaven	2014–2018	
Y-231	16-03 The Misses Robertson of Kintail	Peterhead	2019–	
Y-232	17-28 Alec and Christina Dykes	Torbay	2012–2015	
Y-232	17-29 Richard Cox Scott	Falmouth	2016–2018	
Y-232	17-09 City of London II	Dover	2022	
Y-232	17-26 Henry Alston Hewat	Mallaig	2025–	
Y-233*	16-19 Irene Muriel Rees	Walton and Frinton	2019–2021	
Y-233*	16-15 Enid Collett	Shoreham Harbour	2020	
Y-234	17-37 William Blannin	Buckie	2011–2015	
Y-234	17-37 William Blannin	Buckie	2017	
Y-234	16-07 Lester	Cromer	2020–	
Y-235	17-16 Violet Dorothy and Kathleen	Stromness	2023	
Y-236	17-43 Donald and Barbara Broadhead	Rosslare Harbour	2013–2018	
Y-236	17-39 Elizabeth Fairlie Ramsey	Tobermory	2022–	
Y-237	17-40 Julian and Margaret Leonard	Lochinver	2012	
Y-237	17-32 Ernest and Mabel	Weymouth	2023–	
Y-238	17-30 William Gordon Burr	Portrush	2012–	
Y-239	16-24 John D Spicer	Porthdinllaen	2013–2016	
Y-239	16-24 John D Spicer	Porthdinllaen	2018–	
Y-240	16-23 Diamond Jubilee	Eastbourne	2012–2022	
Y-240	16-23 Diamond Jubilee	Ramsgate	2023–	
Y-241	16-25 Kiwi	Moelfre	2013–	
Y-242	16-20 Rose	The Lizard	2011–	
Y-243	16-21 John Buchanan Barr	Portpatrick	2011–2023	
Y-243	16-16 Molly Hunt	Appledore	2025–	
Y-244	16-22 Alan Massey	Baltimore	2012–	
Y-245	16-26 Norah Wortley	St Davids	2013–	
Y-246	17-28 Alec and Christina Dykes	Torbay	2018–	
Y-247	16-27 Roy Barker IV	The Mumbles	2014–	
–	16-01 Peter and Lesley-Jane Nicholson	Relief fleet		
–	16-06 Frank and Anne Wilkinson	Relief fleet		
–	16-10 Edward and Barbara Prigmore	Relief fleet		
–	16-13 Victor Freeman	Relief fleet		
–	17-17 Fraser Flyer (Civil Service No.43)	Relief fleet		
–	17-27 Volunteer Spirit	Relief fleet		
–	17-31 Roger and Joy Freeman	Relief fleet		
–	17-33 Beth Sell	Relief fleet		
–	17-38 Daniel L Gibson	Relief fleet		
–	17-45 The Duke of Kent	Relief fleet		
–	17-46 Margaret Joan and Fred Nye	Relief fleet		

Number* - unresolved date conflict
