= Yarmouth Lifeboat Station =

RNLI lifeboat station on the Isle of Wight, England

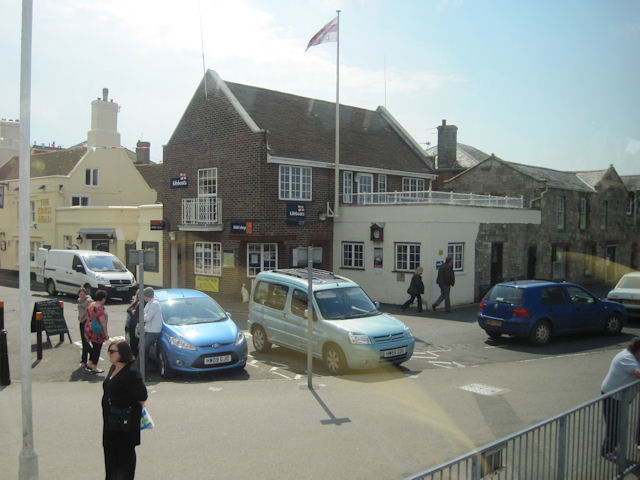
- Yarmouth Lifeboat Station

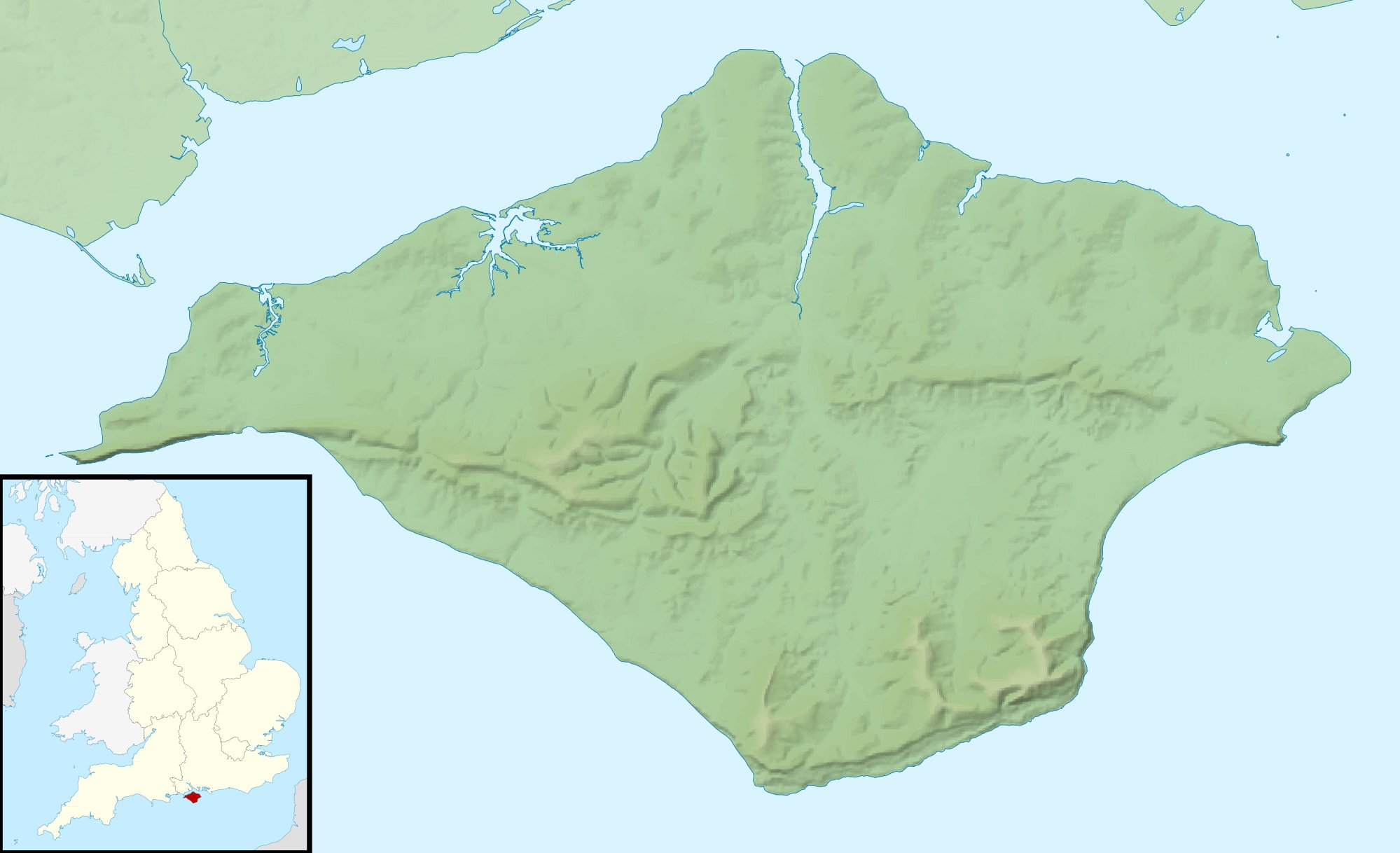
- Location within Isle of Wight

General information
- Type: RNLI Lifeboat Station
- Location: The Boatshed, Quay Street, Yarmouth, Isle of Wight, PO41 0PQ, England
- Coordinates: 50°42′22.1″N 1°30′01.7″W
- Opened: 1924
- Owner: Royal National Lifeboat Institution

Technical details
- Material: Masonry, Brick, Concrete

Website
- Yarmouth RNLI Lifeboat Station

Yarmouth Lifeboat station (not to be confused with Great Yarmouth and Gorleston) is located at Yarmouth, a harbour town overlooking the Solent, on the north-west coast of the Isle of Wight.

A lifeboat managed by a local committee was stationed at Yarmouth for two years from 1868, before being relocated in 1870, to a new station established at Totland Bay. In 1924, for the arrival of a motor-powered lifeboat, the Totland Bay station, now managed by the Royal National Lifeboat Institution (RNLI), was closed, and a new station established at Yarmouth.

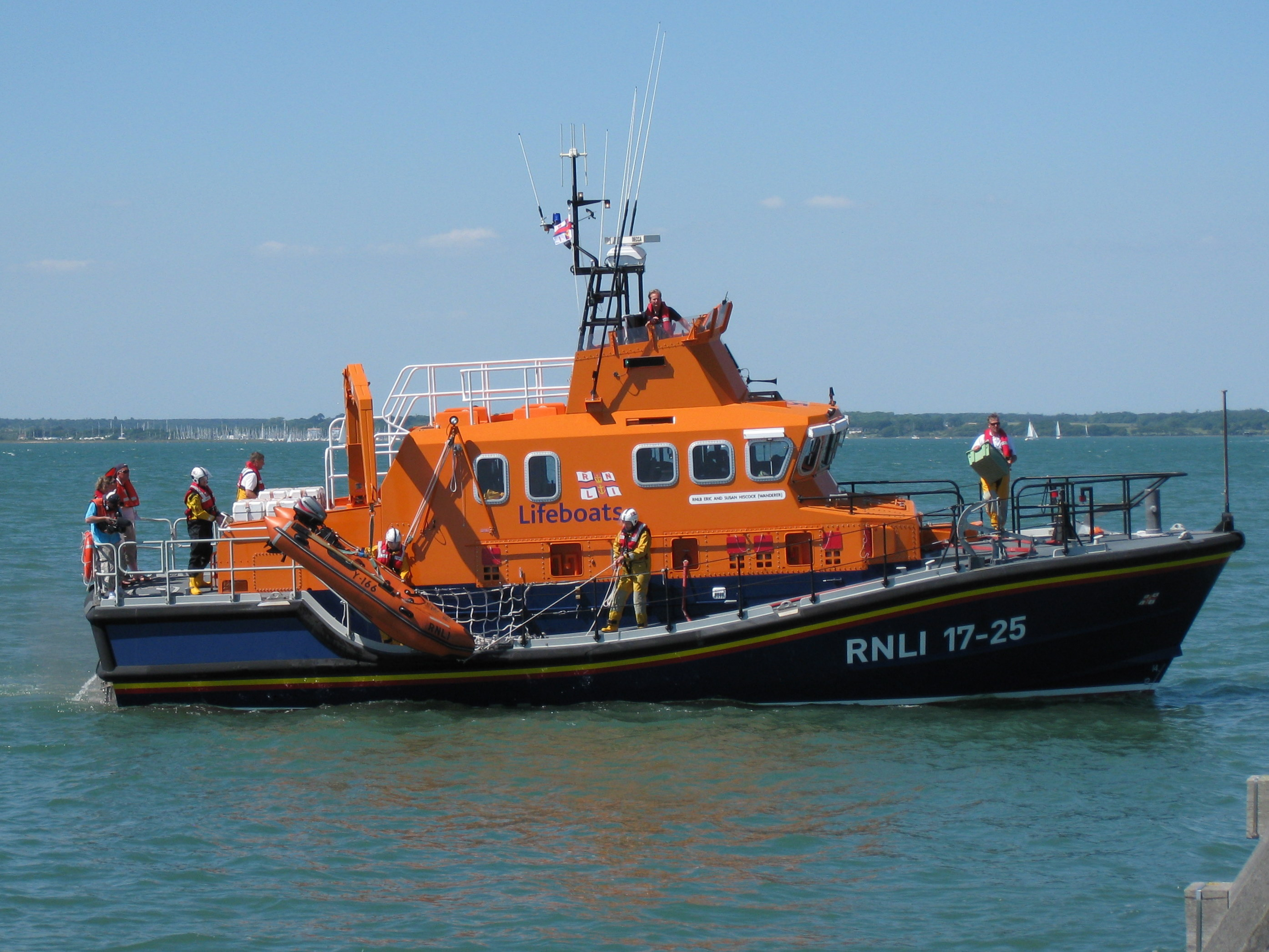
17-25 Eric and Susan Hiscock (Wanderer) (ON 1249)

The station currently operates the 17-25 Eric and Susan Hiscock (Wanderer) (ON 1249), a Severn-class All-weather lifeboat, on station since 2001.

== History ==
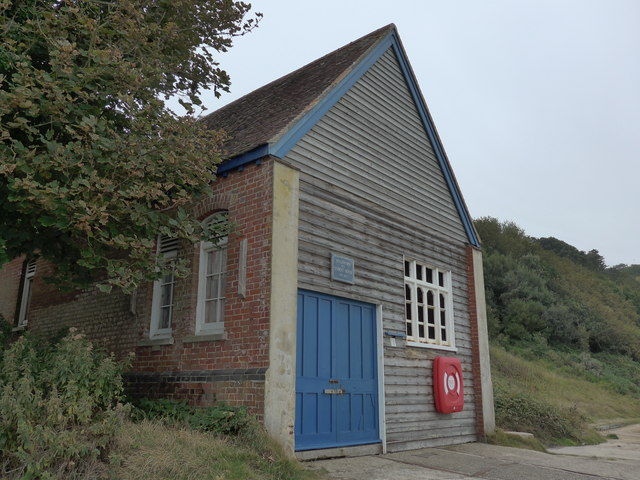
Part of the former lifeboat house, Totland Bay.

Inspired by other Sunday School groups raising funds to provide a lifeboat, the Isle of Wight Sunday Schools also set about fundraising, ultimately raising £162 by June 1868. A 29-foot Lamb and White lifeboat was ordered, and launched at Prince's Green, West Cowes on 29 June 1868. Named Dove, the lifeboat was initially placed at Yarmouth, but later moved to Totland Bay in 1870. The boat was transferred once again in 1885, to Shanklin, when the RNLI took over management of the Totland Bay station.

For more information, please see:–

- Totland Bay Lifeboat Station

In 1924, in view of difficulties encountered trying to operate a motor lifeboat from Totland Bay, a new station was established at Yarmouth, and Totland Lifeboat Station was closed.

=== Motor lifeboat ===
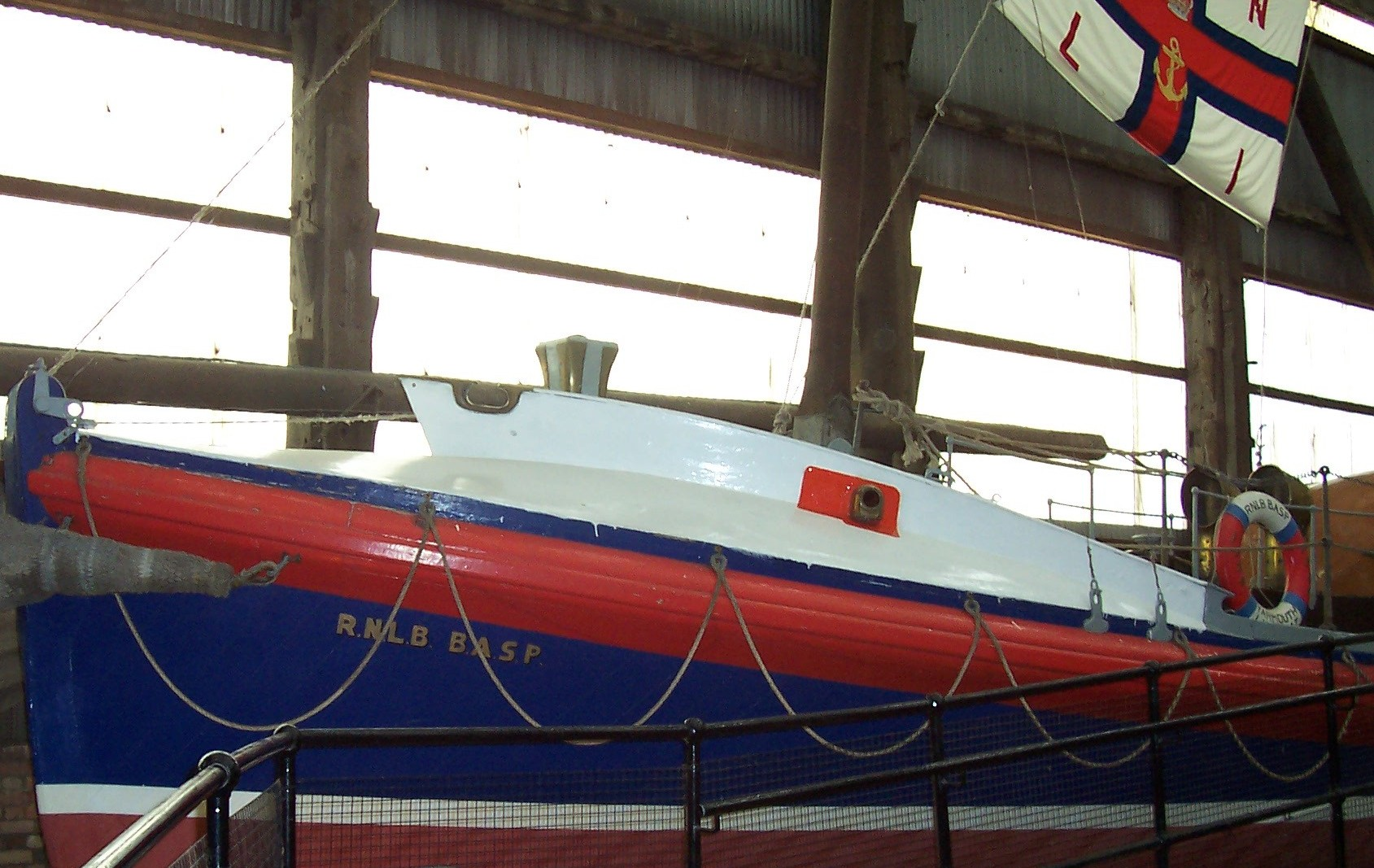
RNLB B. A. S. P. (ON 687), part of the Historic Lifeboat Collection at Chatham Historic Dockyard.

The first motor lifeboat at the new Yarmouth location was the 45-foot Watson-class B.A.S.P. (ON 687). The lifeboat, built by J. Samuel White, was also equipped with sails in case of engine failure. His Royal Highness Edward Prince of Wales named the lifeboat B.A.S.P., after the donors, Blackburn, Armstrong, Smart and Price. During her ten years of service at the station, B.A.S.P. undertook 42 operations which saved 30 lives. After service at several other stations and later in the relief fleet, she was sold out of service in 1955. B.A.S.P. is now on display at as part of the RNLI Historic Lifeboat Collection, at the Chatham maritime museum. B.A.S.P. is recorded in the National Historic Ships register, Certificate No: 1687.

=== Inshore lifeboat ===
A D-class Inshore lifeboat was placed at the station in July 1964, but was permanently withdrawn in October 1978.

=== Improvements ===
In 1988, the Institution made improvements to the onshore facilities for the station. They provided a kitchen, toilets and washrooms within the existing boatstore. In 1994 the RNLI purchased the Yarmouth Customs House on the quayside in Quay Street, and began alterations to the building. This work included creating crew changing rooms, workshop, toilet and showers, and an RNLI souvenir and retail outlet on the ground floor. An office, training room, and crew facilities were built on the first floor. In 2000, work was carried out in the harbour to improve the lifeboat berth.

=== Eric and Susan Hiscock (Wanderer) ===
Eric and Susan Hiscock (Wanderer) (ON 1249) has a top speed of 25 knots (46 km/h) and a range of 250 nmi (460 km). She is operated by a crew of six and is fitted with the latest in navigation, location and communication equipment including electronic chart plotter, VHF radio with direction finder, radar and global positioning systems (GPS). The lifeboat has a displacement of 41 t (40 long tons) and carries a daughter Y-class which is launched and recovered by crane. Having the Y-class enables the crew to make rescues close to shore.

== Notable rescues ==
=== Al Kwather 1 ===
At 13:16 on 28 October 1989, the Arun-class Margaret Russell Fraser (ON-1108) relief lifeboat slipped her moorings at Yarmouth, with Coxswain David Kennett at the helm. The weather in the Solent was poor, with a south westerly severe gale force 9 blowing. The vessel was the 495 tonne roll-on/roll-off car ferry Al Kwather 1, and was reported to be in difficulties, 3.5 miles (5.6 km) east of Peveril Point near Swanage. Some of the cargo of cars had broken loose on the deck, and the ship was unable to weigh anchor and head for shelter, because of the danger to the crew from the loose cars on deck, and the motion of the vessel.

The Rother-class relief lifeboat 37-34 Horace Clarkson (ON 1047) from Swanage, had launched at 10:56, and been on scene since 11:30. In hurricane-force winds, the lifeboat was standing by the vessel. At 15:10, the Margaret Russell Fraser arrived on the scene, and took up a position astern of the Al Kwather 1, allowing the Swanage lifeboat to return home for a well-earned break. After a further hour, and with the Al Kwather 1 in no immediate danger, the Yarmouth lifeboat also made for Swanage, to allow the crew to get some rest, and to make repairs to a fractured bolt on the wheelhouse door, and replace buckled windscreen wipers.

At 00:20, the captain of the Al Kwather 1 reported that his vessel had problems with its engines and requested help. With a helicopter also on its way, both lifeboats left Swanage, with the Margaret Russell Fraser arriving back on scene first. The ship was in complete darkness, listing to port and rolling violently, broadside to the seas. The lifeboat used her searchlights on approaching the ship from the stern, and with great skill, and in a great deal of danger, manoeuvred alongside the ship, where the crew had rigged a cargo net. The first man was quickly down the net, and aboard the lifeboat, but the second man caught his foot in the net, and was left dangling dangerously below the deck of the lifeboat. Coxswain Kennett immediately pulled the lifeboat astern and crew members Lester and Miskin hauled the man on board, with total disregard for their own safety. It was decided that the remaining crew should await the arrival of the helicopter. With all rescued by 02:12, both lifeboats headed for home.

For this service, Coxswain David George Kennett was awarded the RNLI Bronze Medal, with the crew receiving "Medal Service Certificates". Assistant Mechanic Brian Miskin and crewman Joseph Lester were each presented with a "Framed Letter of Thanks signed by the Chairman of the Institution".

== Migrants ==
On 4 October 2026, Severn-class lifeboat Eric and Susan Hiscock (Wanderer) ferried numerous migrants into Gosport, from where they were transferred to a processing centre in Kent. Their arrival was the cause of local unrest.

== Station honours ==
The following are awards made at Yarmouth

- RNIPLS Gold Medal

Lt. Henry Alfred Sydney Symmes, RN, H.M. Coastguard – 1839

- RNLI Silver Medal

David George Kennett, Coxswain/Mechanic – 1976

- RNLI Bronze Medal

Walter Oliver Cotton, Coxswain – 1939

David George Kennett, Coxswain – 1990

- Medal Service Certificate

David Lemonius, Second Coxswain – 1990
Brian Miskin, Assistant Mechanic – 1990
Alan Howard, crew member – 1990
Stuart Pimm, crew member – 1990
Joseph Harwood, crew member – 1990
Joseph Lister, crew member – 1990

- The Maud Smith Award 1975
  (for the bravest act of lifesaving during the year by a member of a lifeboat crew)

David George Kennett, Coxswain/Mechanic – 1976

- Awarded a Gold Pendant

to each of four boys – 1920

- The Thanks of the Institution inscribed on Vellum

The Lifeboat Crew – 1976

John C Cook, Acting Coxswain – 1976

- A Framed Letter of Thanks signed by the Chairman of the Institution

Dr Harrison Broadbent – 1966
Christopher Cook, inshore lifeboat crew – 1966
John Cook, inshore lifeboat crew – 1966

Stuart Pimm, crew member – 1978
Richard Downes, crew member – 1978

Brian Miskin, Assistant Mechanic – 1990
Joseph Lester, crew member – 1990

- Letters of Appreciation signed by the Director of the Institution

David Kennett, Coxswain/Mechanic and the other members of the crew – 1978

- Member, Order of the British Empire (MBE)

Captain Arnold Graham Cole RNR, Honorary Secretary – 1953

David George Kennett, Coxswain – 1995

== Yarmouth lifeboats ==
=== All-weather lifeboats ===
| ON (Note: ON is the RNLI's Official Number of the boat.) | Op. No. (Note: Op. No. is the RNLI's Operational Number of the boat carried on the hull.) | Name | Built | On station | Class | Comments |
|---|---|---|---|---|---|---|
| 687 | – | B.A.S.P. | 1924 | 1924–1934 | 45-foot Watson | On display at the RNLI Collection, Chatham Historic Dockyard |
| 684 | – | Hearts of Oak | 1923 | 1934–1936 | 45-foot Watson | |
| 787 | – | S.G.E. | 1936 | 1936–1937 | 46-foot Watson | Destroyed by fire at Groves & Guttridge, 18 June 1937. |
| 804 | – | S.G.E. | 1938 | 1938–1943 | 46-foot Watson | Replacement for ON 787 |
| 704 | – | Greater London (Civil Service No.3) | 1928 | 1943–1945 | Ramsgate | |
| 804 | – | S.G.E. | 1938 | 1945–1963 | 46-foot Watson | |
| 968 | 48-01 | The Earl and Countess Howe | 1963 | 1963–1977 | Oakley | |
| 1053 | 52-08 | Joy and John Wade | 1977 | 1977–2001 | Arun | |
| 1249 | 17-25 | Eric and Susan Hiscock (Wanderer) | 2000 | 2001– | Severn | Named for Eric and Susan Hiscock. |

=== Inshore lifeboats ===
| Op. No. | Name | On station< | Class | Comments |
|---|---|---|---|---|
| D-20 | Unnamed | 1964 | D-class (RFD PB16) | |
| D-22 | Unnamed | 1965 | D-class (RFD PB16) | |
| D-37 | Unnamed | 1966 | D-class (RFD PB16) | |
| D-22 | Unnamed | 1966–1967 | D-class (RFD PB16) | |
| D-133 | Unnamed | 1967–1968 | D-class (RFD PB16) | |
| D-172 | Unnamed | 1968–1969 | D-class (RFD PB16) | |
| D-161 | Unnamed | 1969–1975 | D-class (RFD PB16) | |
| D-248 | Unnamed | 1976–1978 | D-class (Zodiac III) | |

Inshore lifeboat withdrawn from Yarmouth in 1978.

== See also ==
- List of RNLI stations
- List of former RNLI stations
- Royal National Lifeboat Institution lifeboats
