= Walton and Frinton Lifeboat Station =

RNLI lifeboat station in Essex, England

- Walton and Frinton Lifeboat Station in 2024

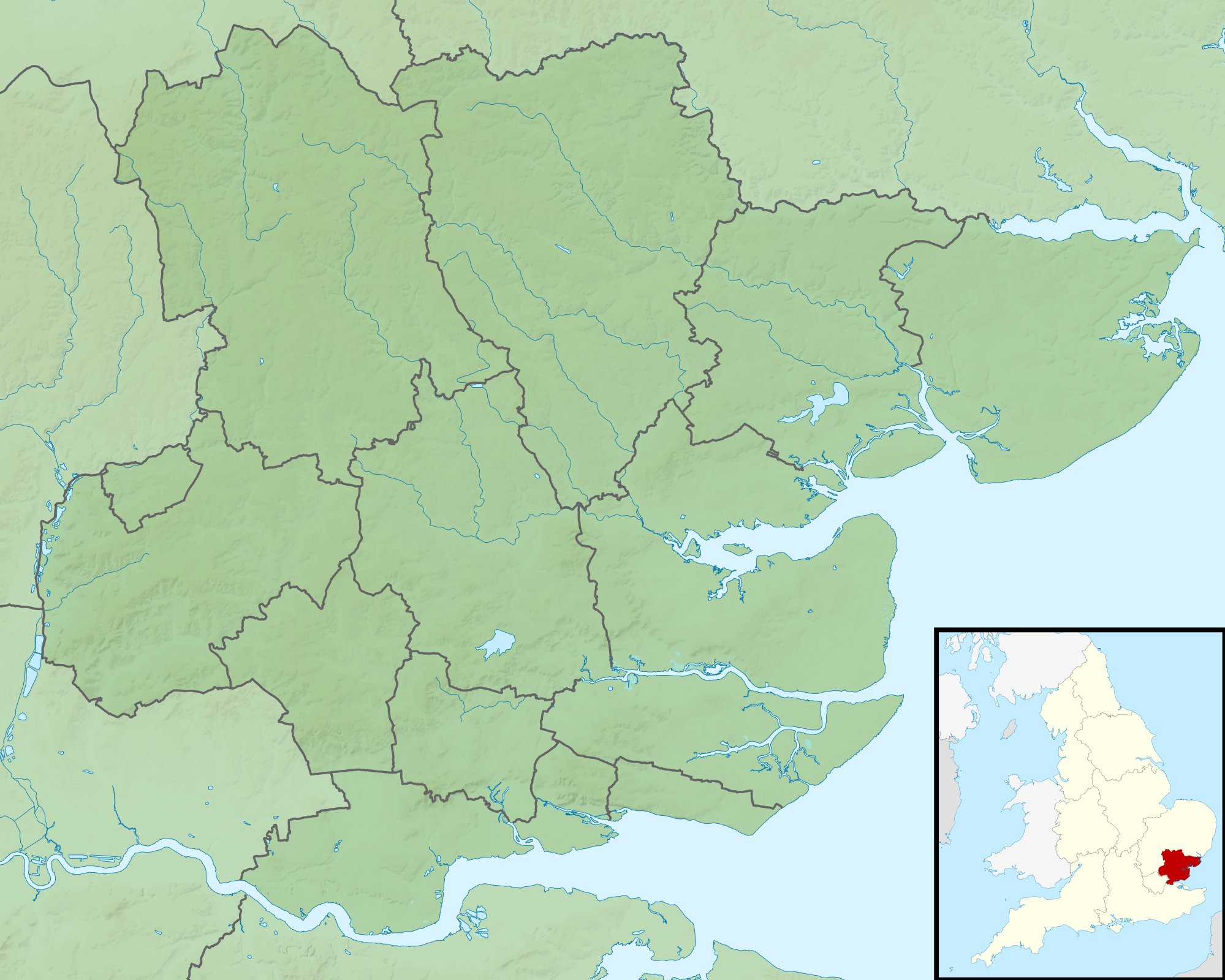
- Location within Essex
- Former names: Walton-on-the-Naze Lifeboat Station

General information
- Type: Lifeboat Station
- Location: The Parade, Walton-on-the-Naze, Essex, CO14 8EA, England
- Coordinates: 51°50′50.20″N 1°16′17.81″E
- Opened: 1884
- Owner: Royal National Lifeboat Institution

Website
- Walton and Frinton RNLI Lifeboat Station

Walton and Frinton Lifeboat Station is located at The Parade in Walton-on-the-Naze, a seaside town in the Tendring District of the county of Essex.

The lifeboat station, formerly known as Walton-on-the-Naze Lifeboat Station, was established in 1884, by the Royal National Lifeboat Institution (RNLI).

The station currently operates the D-class (IB1) Inshore lifeboat, John Wickens (D-798). The lifeboat was initially deployed in 2021 as a boarding boat for the Tamar-class All-weather lifeboat, but is now the permanent lifeboat on station.

== History ==
At a meeting of the RNLI committee of management on Thursday 3 April 1884, it was resolved to establish a lifeboat station at Walton-on-the-Naze.

The Committee thought that it was highly probable that the boat would frequently render good service to vessels in distress on the Gunfleet and other dangerous sandbanks on this part of the coast.

— The Life-boat, Vol.XII, issue 135, pages 464–465

A 37 ft (11 m) self-righting 'Pulling and Sailing' (P&S) lifeboat, one with sails and 12 oars, was constructed by Forrestt of Limehouse, London, at a cost of £395. A boathouse costing £441 was built on a site near to the sea-front at the end of East Terrace, granted to the Institution at a nominal rent by Robert Warner, chairman of the local lifeboat committee. The establishment of the station was defrayed from the gift of £400 from the Dramatic Club of the Honourable Artillery Company, the oldest regiment of Her Majesty's Volunteer Forces, and which had been stationed at Walton in 1860.

Old lifeboat House, Walton on the Naze

The inauguration ceremony for the new station was held on 18 November 1884. Crowds of onlookers arrived by special trains, to find nearly every building in the town decorated with flags and bunting. A guard of honour of 150 men of the Honourable Artillery Company arrived at the station just before noon, along with the band of the regiment. They were accompanied by The Duke of Portland, Lieutenant-Colonel of the regiment, and Baroness Bolsover. A grand procession then took place, with the lifeboat drawn on its carriage by six horses to the new boathouse. The Clacton-on-Sea lifeboat Albert Edward also joined the procession, having been brought by road for the occasion.

On arrival at the boathouse, a blessing and prayers were offered by Vicar and Honorary Secretary, the Rev. J. T. Cooke. The lifeboat was then handed to the care of the local branch by the Duke of Portland, and Lady Bolsover stepped forward to name the new lifeboat Honourable Artillery Company (ON 31).

The lifeboat had only been on its station at Walton-on-the-Naze for just a few weeks, when following signals from the Sunk Lightship, it was called out for an epic rescue on the evening of Christmas Day. After first covering the 10 miles (16 km) to the lightship, the lifeboat continued a further 8–9 miles (13–14 km) to the casualty vessel, the Deike Rickmers, of Bremerhaven, wrecked on Long Sand. After struggling to get close, 25 crew and a large dog were rescued, and landed at Walton on the evening of Boxing Day, a service of 25 hours.

=== 1894 onwards ===
In 1894, disagreements between the RNLI crew and station committee led to some crew members resigning, to set up a private lifeboat station in the town. A former lifeboat was acquired that had once served at Scratby. For the next twenty years, Walton was covered by two lifeboats whose crews were in tense rivalry.

The Honourable Artillery Company (ON 31) was retired in 1900, after 16 years of service. Her replacement was the 43-foot Norfolk and Suffolk-class lifeboat James Stevens No.14 (ON 432). The new lifeboat would be fitted with a 45-hp Brooke motor in 1906.

In 1901, a second independent lifeboat was established at Frinton. This station came to operate two lifeboats, both named Sailor's Friend, over a period of 16 years, the first being a former lifeboat from Caister. On 5 April 1911, 21-year-old crew member Cecil Bambridge drowned, after he was knocked overboard whilst on service. His body was subsequently washed ashore on the Isle of Grain in Kent. Operations at Frinton ceased in 1917.

During World War I (1914 – 1918), the Walton lifeboat assisted both Allied and neutral vessels off the Essex coast. On 29 December 1917, the James Stevens was called out in a gale to assist the 780-ton SS Peregrine of London, which was stranded just off Clacton-on-Sea. After a lengthy search, the lifeboat located the Peregrine and rescued all 59 passengers and the chief steward. After dropping the passengers off, the lifeboat returned to the ship, which had broken in half, and saved the remaining 32 crew members. The rescue was not completed until 9 am on 30 December. The James Stevens No.14 was badly damaged during the rescue, and her first and second coxswains were awarded RNLI Medals in Silver and Bronze, respectively.

James Stevens No.14 was at Walton for a total of 28 years. In 1928 she was replaced by a new Ramsgate-class motor lifeboat, E. M. E. D. (ON 705). In 1931, Walton-on-the-Naze lifeboat station was renamed Walton and Frinton Lifeboat Station.

=== 1940–1977: Dunkirk evacuation and new lifeboats ===
Former Walton lifeboat E.M.E.D., later Capitan Christiansen, on display at Valparaíso in 2006

In May 1940, the E.M.E.D. was one of the Little Ships of Dunkirk which assisted in the Dunkirk evacuation early in World War II. She was commandeered and crewed by the Royal Navy for transporting soldiers on the beach to larger ships waiting offshore. Working inside Dunkirk harbour, E.M.E.D. survived three enemy air attacks off Gravelines, although a during one attack, a shell killed the officer in charge of the lifeboat. Despite sustaining some damage during the operation, she was repaired and returned to Walton lifeboat station after the evacuation. In total, the E.M.E.D. lifeboat was launched a total of 57 times during the war and is credited with saving 20 lives.

The station received a new 46-foot 9in Watson-class lifeboat, Edian Courtauld (ON 910) in 1953, to replace E.M.E.D.. Edian Courtauld was the last new-build lifeboat allocated to Walton until 2011. Built at a cost of £29,687, she was a gift from yachtsman and Arctic explorer Augustine Courtauld, and was named after his mother. Originally powered by twin 40-hp 'Ferry VE4' diesel engines, these were replaced by 70-hp 'Parsons Barracuda' engines in 1967. Edian Courtauld served at Walton until July 1977, launching on service 224 times and saving 143 lives.

Edian Courtauld was replaced in 1977, by a self-righting 48-foot 6in Oakley-class lifeboat, The Earl and Countess Howe (ON 968), which had been built in 1963 at a cost of £40,348. Powered by twin Gardner 6LX 110-hp diesel engines, she had spent 14 years stationed at Yarmouth Lifeboat Station on the Isle of Wight, before being transferred to Walton. The Earl and Countess Howe served at Walton until January 1984, launching on service 64 times and saving 21 lives.

=== 1984–2005: lifeboat replacements and station work ===
In 1984, The Earl and Countess Howe was retired and replaced by City of Birmingham (ON 1012), a 48-foot 6in Solent-class lifeboat. The City of Birmingham launched to several of the Radio Ships moored off the Essex coast, including the Radio Caroline ship Ross Revenge. This lifeboat was stationed at Walton until August 1993 and during her service there, she launched on service 186 times, saving 40 lives.

In 1993, the second prototype Tyne-class lifeboat Sam and Joan Woods (ON 1075), built in 1982, was allocated to the station after spending nine years in the RNLI Relief fleet. Sam and Joan Woods stayed at Walton for less than three years, launching on service 67 times and saving 10 lives, before being replaced in May 1996 by the 1989-built Tyne-class vessel Kenneth Thelwall II (ON 1154).

Construction of an extension to the shore building was completed in April 1998, providing improved crew facilities, and a fuel storage room.

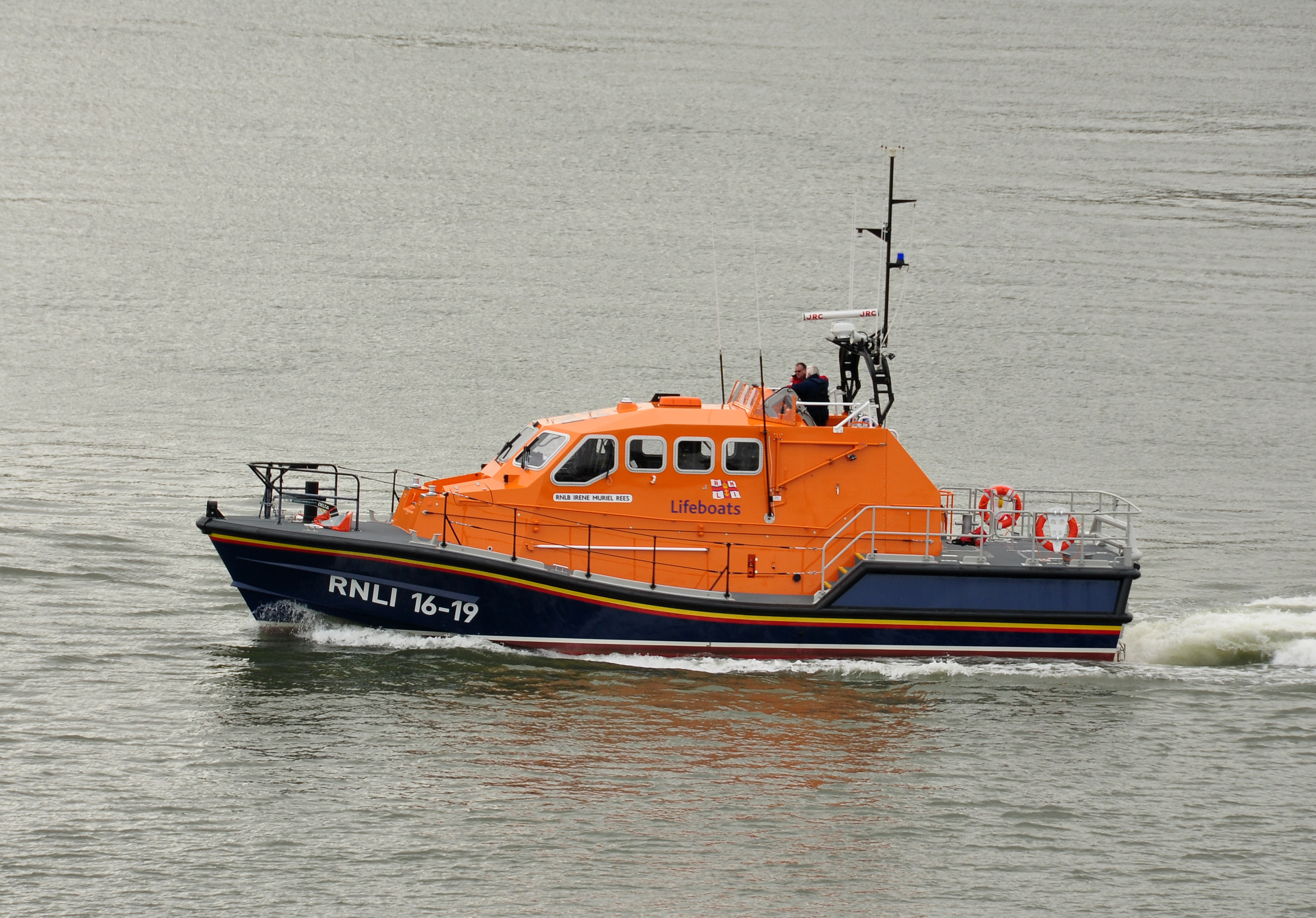
Tamar-class All-weather lifeboat Irene Muriel Rees (ON 1299)

The station was once again improved in 2005, with a new berth and wave break constructed alongside the pier, allowing quicker and safer boarding response times. The work cost £1.2 million. The new wave break was officially opened on 1 May 2005 by the RNLI Operations Director Michael Vlasto.

Tyne-class lifeboat 47-036 Kenneth Thelwall II (ON 1154) served at Walton until May 2011, when the station received its first brand new lifeboat since 1953, the Tamar-class 16-19 Irene Muriel Rees (ON 1299). The lifeboat was built at a cost of £2.7 million, funded in part from the legacy of £1 million from the estate of Irene Muriel Rees.

=== 2018 onwards ===
In 2018, the RNLI had to relocate Irene Muriel Rees to a mooring at Titchmarsh Marina, after safety concerns were raised over the structure of Walton Pier. The boat was returned to the Pier mooring after three weeks, but crews had undergone training in that time, so they could access the boat using a small inflatable boarding boat, rather than access via the Pier.

In October 2022, the RNLI announced changes to the Essex lifeboat allocation. The Walton and Frinton Tamar was to be withdrawn for reallocation, and a new Shannon-class lifeboat was to be stationed at the flanking station at Clacton-on-Sea. In April 2024, the Walton and Frinton Tamar All-weather lifeboat 16-19 Irene Muriel Rees (ON 1299) was withdrawn, leaving no operational lifeboat on station. In 2025, after a period of crew training, the D-class (IB1) boarding boat would become the sole lifeboat operating at Walton and Frinton.

During this time, the 1884 former boathouse at East Terrace, which for sometime had operated as a Maritime Museum, was closed during the COVID-19 pandemic, and never reopened. The exhibits were placed in storage with the Frinton and Walton Heritage Trust, and are no longer on display.

== Station awards ==
The following are awards made at Walton and Frinton:

- RNLI Silver Medal
  Henry Britton, Coxswain – 1902
  William Hammond, Coxswain – 1918
  Thomas Henry Bloom, Coxswain – 1939
  Frank Bloom, Coxswain – 1976
- RNLI Bronze Medal
  John Charles Byford, Second Coxswain – 1918
  Walter Jonas Oxley, crew member – 1939
  Fraser Thomas Bacon, crew member – 1939
  Frederick John Williams, crew member – 1939
  Thomas Henry Bloom, Coxswain – 1941
  Thomas Claude Brooke, Mechanic – 1941
  Thomas Henry Bloom, Coxswain – 1946 (Second-service clasp)
  Walter Jonas Oxley, Coxswain – 1964 (Second-service clasp)
  Frank Bloom, Coxswain – 1967
  Keith Richardson, Assistant Mechanic – 1973
  Jack Barrett, crew member – 1973
- 'The Thanks of the Institution inscribed on Vellum'
  Coxswain Frank Bloom and to each of his crew – 1966
  The nine members of the Walton and Frinton Lifeboat crew – 1967
  The crew of Walton and Frinton Lifeboat – 1973
  The crew of Walton and Frinton Lifeboat – 1976
  Dennis Finch, Coxswain – 1985
- 'A Framed Letter of Thanks signed by the Chairman of the Institution'
  D. Finch, Coxswain – 1985
  R. Kemp, Second Coxswain – 1985
  J. Berry, Mechanic – 1985
  M. Richardson, Asst Mechanic – 1985
  B. Oxley, crew member – 1985
  T. Halls, crew member – 1985
  B. Ward, crew member – 1985
  S. Moore, crew member – 1985
  G. Edwards, crew member – 1985
  J. Fletcher, shore helper – 1985
  A. Davies, shore helper – 1985
  J. Oxley, shore helper – 1985
  J. Hatcher, shore helper – 1985
  R. Peters, shore helper – 1985
  K. Coleman, shore helper – 1985
  R. Lacey, shore helper – 1985
  S. Oxley, shore helper – 1985
  Robert Thomas Kemp, Coxswain – 1990
  Brian Oxley, Coxswain – 1995
  Gary Edwards, Second Coxswain – 1995
  James Berry, Mechanic – 1995
  Michael Richardson, Assistant Mechanic – 1995
  Russell Bettany, crew member – 1995
  Roger Lacy, crew member – 1995
  John Oxley, crew member – 1995
- 'Letters of Thanks, signed by the Deputy Director of the Institution'
  Dennis Finch, Coxswain and his crew – 1983
- Inscribed Silver Watch, awarded by the German Government
  John Byford, Coxswain – 1932

== Roll of honour ==
In memory of those lost whilst serving at Walton and Frinton:

- Collapsed and died whilst answering the call to launch, 27 March 1889.
  Frederick J. Batchelor, crew member, Walton-on-the-Naze (53)
- Died from an injury received whilst assisting the launch of the lifeboat, 10 December 1892
  John Downs (41)
- Knocked overboard and drowned on service on 5 April 1911. His body was subsequently washed ashore on the Isle of Grain in Kent.
  Cecil Bambridge, crew member, Frinton-on-Sea (21)

== Walton and Frinton lifeboats ==
=== Pulling and Sailing (P&S) lifeboats ===
==== RNLI ====
On station	ON (Note: ON is the RNLI's Official Number of the boat.)	Name	Built	Class	Comments
1884−1900	31	Honourable Artillery Company	1884	37-foot self-righting (P&S)	(Note: 37 ft 0 in (11.28 m) x 9 ft 0 in (2.74 m) (12-oared) self-righting (P&S) lifeboat, gift of the Honourable Artillery Company Dramatic Club, built by Forrest of Limehouse, London, costing £395.); Condemned and broken up in 1900.
1900−1906	432	James Stevens No. 14	1900	43-foot Norfolk and Suffolk (P&S)	(Note: 43 ft 0 in (13.11 m) x 12 ft 6 in (3.81 m) (12-oared) Norfolk and Suffolk-class non-self-righting (P&S) lifeboat, legacy of Mr J. Stevens of Birmingham, built by Thames Ironworks of Blackwall, London, costing £1,420.); 40-hp Brooke motor fitted in 1906.

==== Walton-on-Naze Volunteer Lifeboat Society ====
On station	Name	Built	Class	Comments
1894−1897	True to the Core	1854	44-foot Norfolk & Suffolk (P&S)	(Note: 44 ft 0 in (13.41 m) x 13 ft 0 in (3.96 m) (12-oared) Norfolk and Suffolk-class non-self-righting (P&S) lifeboat, funded by the California Beachmen's Company, built by James Beeching of Gt. Yarmouth, costing £200 when new.); Previously the Royal Albert at Scratby.
1897−1911	True to the Core	1897	40-foot Norfolk & Suffolk (P&S)	(Note: 40 ft 0 in (12.19 m) x 13 ft 0 in (3.96 m) (12-oared) Norfolk and Suffolk-class non-self-righting (P&S) lifeboat, funded by the Walton-on-Naze Beachmen's Company, built by Jn. Houston of Rowhedge, Essex, costing £437.); 45-hp Brooke motor fitted in 1909. Sold c.1913.

==== Frinton-on-Sea Lifeboat Society ====
On station	Name	Built	Class	Comments
1901−1907	Sailor's Friend	1867	33-foot 7in Norfolk & Suffolk (P&S)	(Note: 33 ft 7 in (10.24 m) x 10 ft 0 in (3.05 m) non-self-righting (P&S) surf-lifeboat, funded by the Frinton-on-Sea LB Society, built by James Beeching of Gt. Yarmouth, costing £153 when new.); Previously at Caister. Sold in 1907.
1907−1917	Sailor's Friend	1907	40-foot Norfolk & Suffolk (P&S)	(Note: 40 ft 0 in (12.19 m) Norfolk and Suffolk-class non-self-righting (P&S) lifeboat, funded by the Frinton-on-Sea LB Society, built by J. & H. Cann of Harwich, costing £360.); Sank in 1917 and sold from service.

=== Motor lifeboats ===
On station	ON	Op.No. (Note: Op.No. is the RNLI's Operational Number of the boat carried on the hull.)	Name	Built	Class	Comments
1906−1928	432	−	James Stevens No. 14	1900	Norfolk and Suffolk	
1928−1953	705	−	E. M. E. D.	1928	Ramsgate	Transferred to the Relief fleet.
1953−1977	910	−	Edian Courtauld	1953	46-foot 9in Watson	Transferred to the Relief fleet.
1977–1984	968	48-01	The Earl and Countess Howe	1963	Oakley	Previously at Yarmouth.
1984−1993	1012	48-009	City of Birmingham	1970	Solent	Previously at Exmouth. Transferred to the Relief fleet.
1993−1996	1075	47-002	Sam and Joan Woods	1982	Tyne	First deployed in the Relief fleet.
1996−2011	1154	47-036	Kenneth Thewall II	1989	Tyne	Previously at Ramsgate.
2011−2024	1299	16-19	Irene Muriel Rees	2011	Tamar	Withdrawn to the Relief fleet, April 2024. Later at Tynemouth.

More post-service details can be found on the respective lifeboat class pages.
All-weather lifeboat withdrawn from station, April 2024.

=== Inshore lifeboats ===
On station	Op.No.	Name	Class	Comments
2025−	D-798	John Wickens	D-class (IB1)	Former Boarding Boat.

== See also ==
- List of RNLI stations
- List of former RNLI stations
- Royal National Lifeboat Institution lifeboats

== Notes ==
=== Sources ===
- Leonard, Richie; Denton, Tony (2026). Lifeboat Enthusiasts Handbook 2026. Lifeboats Enthusiasts' Society.
- Farr, Grahame; Morris, Jeff (1992). List of British Lifeboats Part 1 & 2 (Second ed.). Lifeboat Enthusiasts' Society.
- Morris, Jeff (2008). List of British Lifeboats Part 3 (Third ed.). Lifeboat Enthusiasts' Society.
