= Totland Bay Lifeboat Station =

Former RNLI lifeboat station on the Isle of Wight, UK

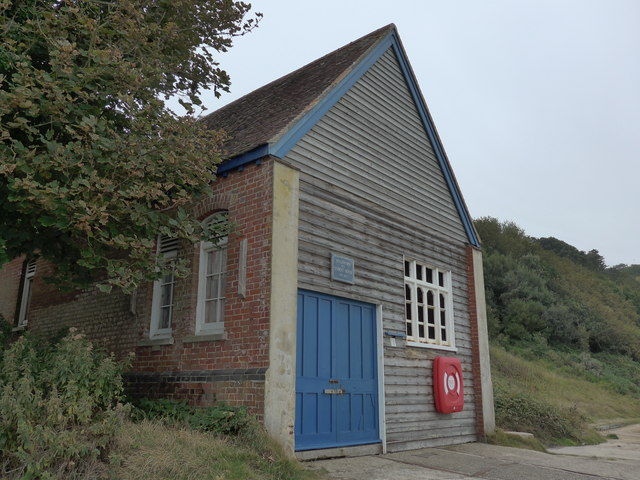
- Part of the former lifeboat house, Totland Bay

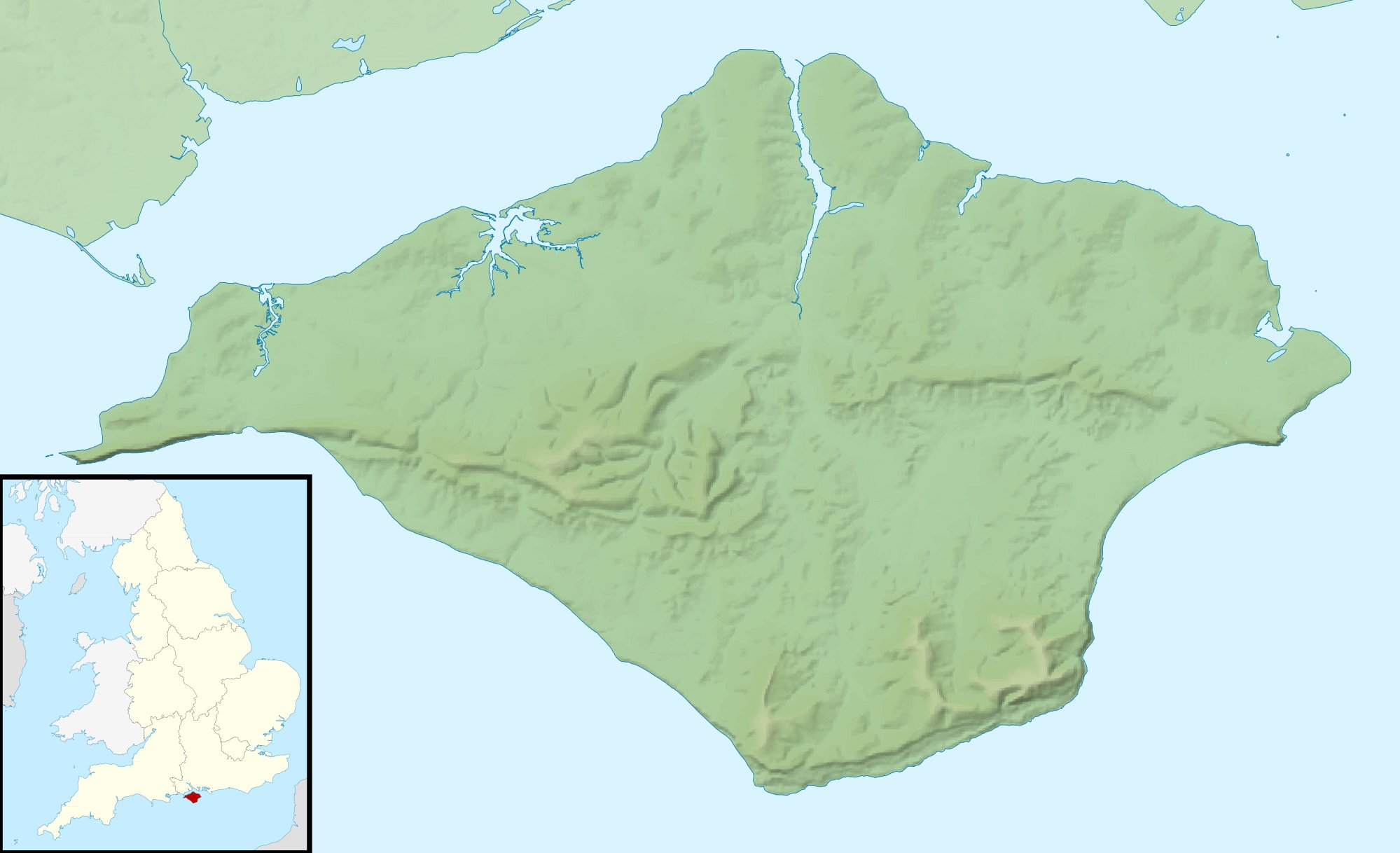
- Totland Bay, Isle of Wight

General information
- Status: Closed
- Type: RNLI Lifeboat Station
- Location: Totland Bay, Isle of Wight, England
- Coordinates: 50°40′42.8″N 1°32′52.5″W
- Opened: 1885
- Closed: 1924

Totland Bay Lifeboat Station was located at the foot of Widdick Chine, on the shore at Totland, on the northern shore of the Western Peninsula, of the Isle of Wight.

A lifeboat was first placed at Totland in 1870 by a local committee, but was withdrawn and transferred to Shanklin, on the establishment of the Royal National Lifeboat Institution (RNLI) station at Totland in 1885.

Totland Bay Lifeboat Station was closed in 1924, following the decision to locate a new motor-powered lifeboat at Yarmouth.

== History ==
Ever since its founding in 1824, the Royal National Institution for the Preservation of Life from Shipwreck (RNIPLS), later to become the RNLI in 1854, would award medals for deeds of gallantry at sea, even if no lifeboats were involved. On the night of 19 April 1849, the brig Love and Unity, on passage to Poole, ran aground on The Needles and broke up. One boy was lost. The remaining five crewmen and the Master managed to climb onto a rock, and were rescued at 10:00 the following day by the Coastguard galley crew from Hurst Castle. Chief boatman John Pepper was awarded the RNIPLS Silver Medal.

Inspired by other Sunday School groups raising funds to provide a local lifeboat, the Isle of Wight Sunday Schools set about fundraising, ultimately raising £162 by June 1868. A 29-foot Lamb and White lifeboat had been ordered, and was launched at Prince's Green, West Cowes, on 29 June 1868. Named Dove, the lifeboat was placed at Yarmouth later in 1868, but later transferred to Totland Bay in 1870. It was withdrawn and transferred to Shanklin on arrival of the RNLI lifeboat.

At a meeting of the RNLI committee of management on Thursday 1 November 1883, it was decided to establish an RNLI lifeboat station at Totland Bay, and to appropriate one of two lifeboats bequeathed by the late Mrs Luckombe of Brighton.

In the November 1885 edition of the RNLI journal 'The Lifeboat', it was announced that following application by local residents, a new lifeboat station had been established at Totland Bay. A large 37-foot self-righting 'Pulling and Sailing' (P&S) lifeboat, one with (12) oars and sails, had been placed at the station, and under the supervision of Commander St. Vincent Nepean, RN, the Inspector of Life-boats for the Southern District, had completed her first exercise in June 1885. A boathouse and launch slipway was constructed on the shore at the village of Totland, at a cost of £678. The cost of the lifeboat was defrayed from the bequest of the late Mrs Luckombe of Brighton, and the lifeboat was duly named Charles Luckombe (ON 39).

The Charles Luckombe was replaced in 1903 with a new 37-foot lifeboat. Funded from the £1000 bequest of the late Mrs Mary Fleming of Hemel Hempstead, at a ceremony on 24 August 1903, the lifeboat was named Robert Fleming (ON 503), in memory of her late husband.

In 1915, the 56-foot Steam-class lifeboat James Stevens No.3 (ON 420) was assigned to Totland Bay. In 1894, property developer James Stevens left £50,000 to the RNLI. 20 lifeboats were commissioned, the largest number of lifeboats from a single donation. It was impossible for the 56-foot boat to be kept in the Totland boathouse, or even brought ashore, and the logistics of maintaining a steam-powered lifeboat on a mooring in an open bay seem highly impractical. It is assumed therefore, that the lifeboat was kept and maintained at Yarmouth, although no records can be found.

In 1919, the James Stevens No.3 was taken to the River Thames for a demonstration of powered lifeboats. She would never return to Totland, and would be transferred to Dover.

After 4 years away in the relief fleet, the Robert Fleming (ON 503) was brought back to Totland Bay, serving for another five years.

When the Brooke lifeboat couldn't launch due to the conditions on 9 July 1922, the Robert Fleming was launched at 03:00, after reports of a vessel signalling distress, three of four miles off Brook. The vessel was never found. In the face of the severe gale, the Coxswain decided it was impossible to return directly home, and opted to take the boat all the way around the Isle of Wight, a distance of 60 miles (97 km). The boat was monitored at various points around the coast, and successfully returned home at 17:00, 14 hours after setting out. The coxswain and crew were awarded additional monetary rewards for this service.

In 1924, in view of difficulties encountered trying to operate a motor lifeboat from Totland Bay, a new station was established at Yarmouth, and Totland Lifeboat Station was closed.

The lifeboat on station at the time of closure, Robert Fleming (ON 503), was sold from service in 1925, with no further reports. After various suggestions, it is now accepted that the building still at Totland Bay, is the original rear half of the original RNLI boathouse, and not the remains of the H. Simmonds's boat house, which was demolished.

== Station honours ==
The following are awards made at Totland Bay.

- RNIPLS Silver Medal

John Pepper, Chief Boatman, H.M. Coastguard, Hurst Castle – 1849

== Totland Bay lifeboats ==
ON (Note: ON is the RNLI's Official Number of the boat.)	Name	Built	On station	Class	Comments
–	Dove	1868	1870–1885	29-foot 'Whale-boat'	(Note: 29 ft (8.8 m) 'Whale-boat, funded by the Isle of Wight Sunday Schools, built by Lamb and White of Cowes, costing £162.); Previously at Yarmouth.
39	Charles Luckombe	1884	1885–1903	37-foot Self-righting (P&S)	(Note: 37 ft (11 m) x 8 ft 1 in (2.46 m) (12-oared) self-righting (P&S) lifeboat, legacy of Mrs Luckombe of Brighton, built by Forrestt of Limehouse, London, costing £388.)
503	Robert Fleming	1902	1903–1915	37-foot Self-righting (P&S)	(Note: 37 ft (11 m) x 9 ft 3 in (2.82 m) (10-oared) self-righting (P&S) lifeboat, legacy of Mrs M. Fleming of Hemel Hempstead, built by Thames Ironworks of Blackwall, London, costing £934.)
420	James Stevens No.3	1898	1915–1919	56-foot Steam	(Note: 56 ft 6 in (17.22 m) x 15 ft 9 in (4.80 m) Steam-class lifeboat, with single 180-hp compound engine, legacy of Mr J. Stevens of Birmingham, built by J. Samuel White of Cowes, costing £3,298.); Previously at Grimsby, Gorleston and Angle.
503	Robert Fleming	1902	1919–1924	37-foot Self-righting (P&S)	

Station Closed, 1924

== See also ==
- List of RNLI stations
- List of former RNLI stations
- Independent lifeboats in Britain and Ireland
