= Tynemouth Lifeboat Station =

RNLI Lifeboat station in Tyne and Wear, England

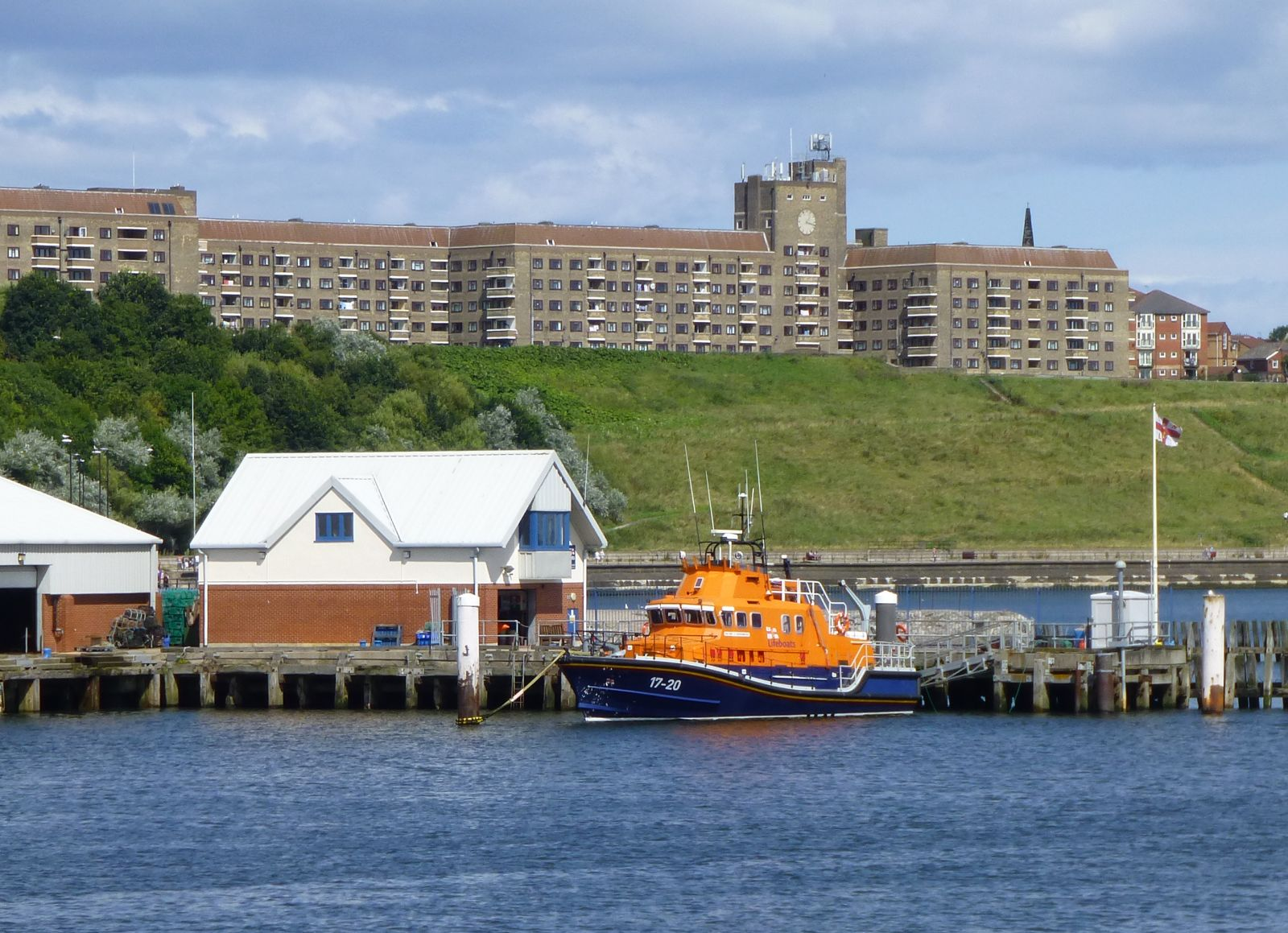
- Tynemouth Lifeboat Station

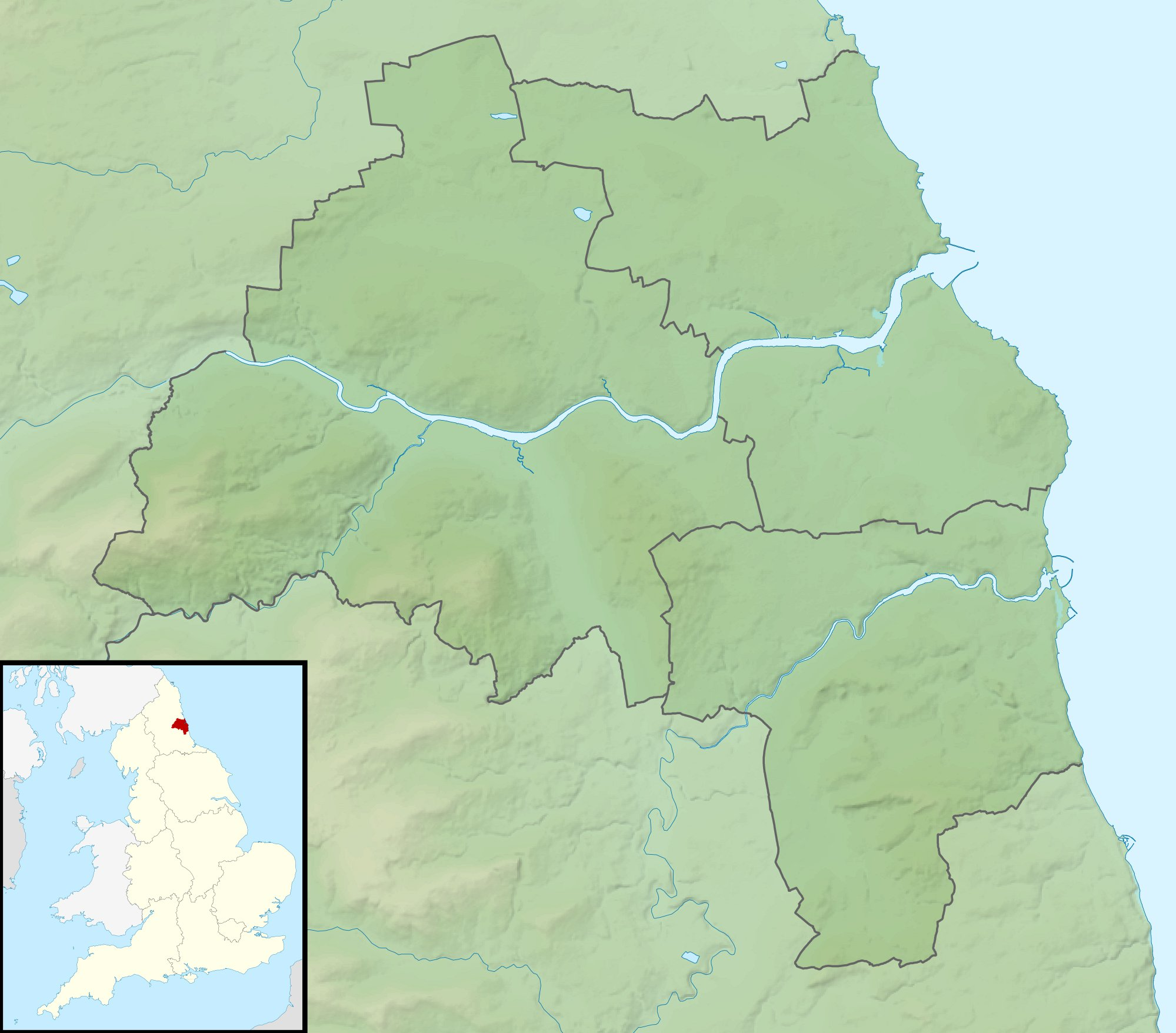
- Location within Tyne and Wear

General information
- Type: RNLI Lifeboat Station
- Location: North Shields Fish Quay, North Shields, Tyne and Wear, UK
- Coordinates: 55°00′32.7″N 1°25′58.4″W
- Opened: TLI 1789–1947; RNLI 1862–Present
- Owner: Royal National Lifeboat Institution

Website
- Tynemouth RNLI Lifeboat Station

Tynemouth Lifeboat Station sits overlooking the River Tyne at Fish Quay, North Shields, in the county of Tyne and Wear.

A lifeboat was first stationed across the River Tyne in South Shields in 1789, with a second lifeboat placed in North Shields in 1798, both operated by the Tyne Lifeboat Institution (TLI).

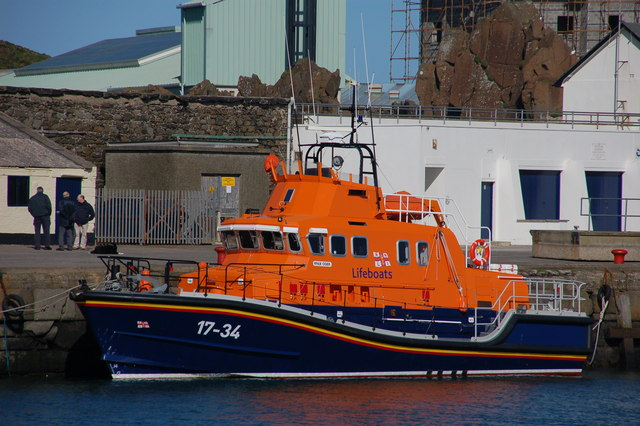
Severn-class All-weather lifeboat 17-34 Osier (ON 1263)

The Royal National Lifeboat Institution (RNLI) currently operates a Severn-class All-weather lifeboat 17-34 Osier (ON 1263), on station since 2021, and a D-class (IB1) Inshore lifeboat Little Susie (D-829), on station since 2018.

== History ==
In the late 1700s, two lifeboats were operated at Tynemouth by the Tyne Lifeboat Institution (TLI), both built by Henry Greathead, to an amalgamated design of both Greathead and William Wouldhave. At the time, the mouth of the River Tyne was particularly treacherous in poor weather, with many ships lost, but many lives saved.

Safety would be radically improved in later years, with the construction of the North and South Tyne Piers, with building starting in 1854, finally completed in 1910.

The first lifeboat, known as Original, was wrecked in 1830. The Tyne Lifeboat Institution would not have the funds for a replacement until 1833. In 1832, a request for a lifeboat was placed by the Port of Newcastle Shipwreck Association, with the Royal National Institute for the Preservation of Life from Shipwreck (RNIPLS), who supplied a 26-foot Palmer-type non-self-righting lifeboat, arriving in October 1832, to be managed by the TLI. A new boathouse had been constructed at Prior's Haven. The boat was on service for 10 years, until it was badly damaged in 1842, and scrapped.

The Tyne Institution would maintain their fleet of lifeboats, providing 2 new boats and a new boathouse at South Beach, South Shields. On 4 December 1849, the Tyne Institution lifeboat Providence was launched to the aid to the brig Betsy, which had run ashore at Herd sands. It was whilst Providence was alongside the vessel, when the lifeboat capsized. The Tyne was launched, and picked up the three survivors still holding onto the Providence, and North Shields lifeboat Northumberland rescued the crew of the Betsy, plus one lifeboat man who had managed to get aboard, but 20 of the 24 crew of the Providence were lost.

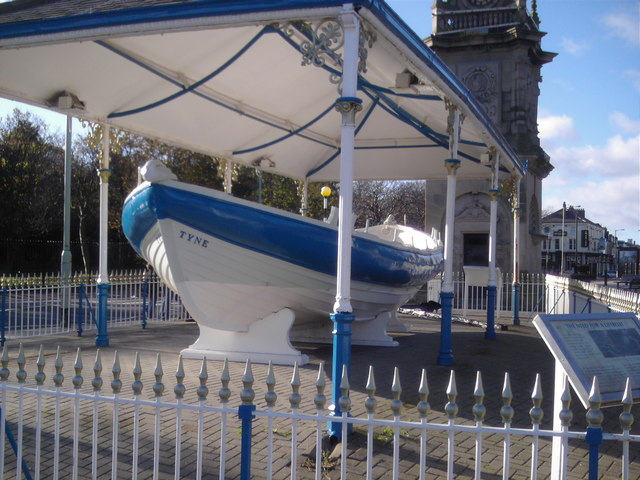
Tyne lifeboat on display in South Shields

It was as a result of this disaster that Algernon Percy, 4th Duke of Northumberland of Alnwick Castle, president of the RNIPLS, set a competition for the design of a Self-righting lifeboat, which was won by James Beeching of Great Yarmouth. This design would become the basis for lifeboats for many years afterwards.

In 1862, following a series of shipwrecks in and around Prior's Haven, it was suggested that the (now) RNLI should place a lifeboat at a new station at Prior's Haven. A new boathouse was constructed, and the Constance, a 33-foot self-righting 10-oared lifeboat, arrived in November 1862. The Prior, a TLI boat, was relocated from Prior's Haven to South Beach, South Shields.

Following the wreck of the Stanley in 1864, it was decided to place a second lifeboat at Tynemouth, with the RNLI building a new station at Black Middens. Both lifeboat services would operate alongside each other until the early 1900s, often responding to the same shipwreck, one or other standing by while a rescue was performed. However, in 1905, everything changed when the RNLI placed a motor-powered lifeboat at Tynemouth, followed soon after by the completion of the Piers. A motor lifeboat was far better placed to respond, and fewer rescues were required, with the mouth of the River Tyne now protected. The TLI would be renamed the Tyne Lifeboat Society (TLS) in 1905, maintaining the last of their lifeboats until the 1940s. The RNLI No.2 station was closed.

After some years with the motor lifeboat moored afloat, the RNLI took over a boathouse belonging to the War-office in 1921. It was located right next to the Tyne Lifeboat Society boathouse at Clifford's Fort. The lifeboat was mounted on a trolley, which could be winched up or down a trolley-way. In 1941, bombs dropped in a war-time air-raid destroyed the Tyne Lifeboat house, containing the James Young lifeboat, and the RNLI boathouse, containing the John Pymont (ON 824). A replacement boathouse and slipway would be constructed at the same location in 1947.

To commemorate the centenary of the Tynemouth lifeboat station, a stained glass window, showing a picture of the Original lifeboat, was unveiled by Elizabeth Percy, Duchess of Northumberland at the Seamen's Chapel of Christ Church, North Shields on 16 September 1962.

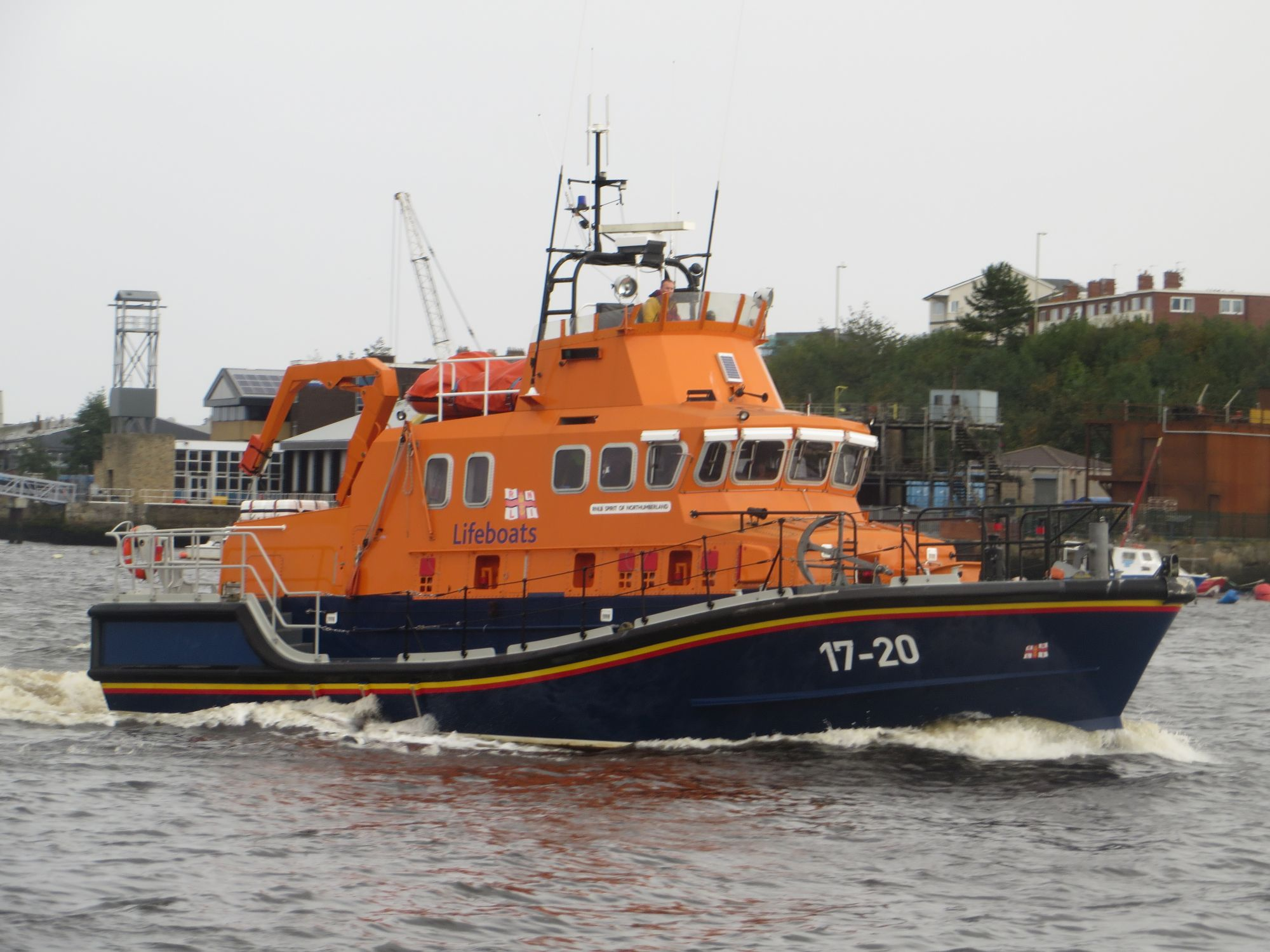
Severn-class lifeboat 17-20 Spirit of Northumberland (ON 1242)

In 1965, the first Tynemouth Inshore lifeboat arrived, one of the earliest inshore D-class (RFD PB16) boats numbered D-12. When a new All-weather Arun-class lifeboat arrived in 1980, the boat would once again be moored afloat. A replacement station building, housing the Inshore lifeboat, launched with the use of a davit, and a mooring for the All-weather boat, were provided in 1997.

A 25-knot (29 mph; 46 km/h) Severn-class lifeboat, 17-20 Spirit of Northumberland (ON 1242), would be placed on service in 1999. After serving 22 years, she was withdrawn in 2021, replaced by 17-34 Osier (ON 1263). Spirit of Northumberland was sent to the RNLI Headquarters at Poole, to be the second Severn-class boat to receive what was known as a "SLEP" upgrade (Severn Life Extension Programme), to allow a further 25 years of service. Just two boats were upgraded, before the programme was officially abandoned in 2025.

The Tyne lifeboat of the Tyne Lifeboat Institution is restored and on display at South Shields. The Bedford lifeboat of the Tyne Lifeboat Institution has been restored, and is in storage awaiting a suitable display location.

On the 2 October 2025, following a complete review of coastal operations, the RNLI announced that a Tamar-class All-weather lifeboat would replace the Severn-class lifeboat 17-34 Osier in 2026. Tamar-class lifeboat 16-19 Irene Muriel Rees (ON 1299), formerly at Walton and Frinton, arrived at Tynemouth on Saturday 17 June 2026, and will assume duties following a period of training.

== Station honours ==
The following are awards made at Tynemouth:

- RNLI Gold Medal
  Capt. Herbert Edgar Burton – 1914
  Robert Smith, Coxswain – 1914
- Gold Medals, awarded by the Tynemouth Trust
  The Tynemouth Lifeboat Crew – 1914
- RNIPLS Silver Medal
  Henry Strachan, River Pilot – 1829
  William Tully, Pilot – 1832
  T. Thorp, storekeeper of the rockets – 1839
  John Cunningham, Rocket Apparatus Superintendent – 1843
  William Wheeler, Thames River Pilot – 1851
- RNLI Silver Medal
  Lawrence Byrne, Chief Officer, H.M. Coastguard, – 1864
  James Gilbert, Coxswain – 1886
  James Gilbert, Coxswain – 1898 (Second-Service Clasp)
  Capt. H. E. Burton – 1913
  Coxswain Robert Smith – 1913
  James S. Brownlee, Second Coxswain – 1914
  Cmdr. Basil Hall, RN, Lifeboat Inspector – 1914
  Robert Smith, Coxswain – 1916 (Second-Service Clasp)
  James S. Brownlee, Second Coxswain – 1916 (Second-Service Clasp)
  John Hogg, Coxswain – 1986
- Silver Medal Service Certificate
  Martin Kenny, Second Coxswain – 1986
  John Watson, Motor Mechanic – 1986
  Trevor Fryer, crew member – 1986
  James Griffiths, crew member – 1986
  David Lisle, crew member – 1986
  John Norris, crew member – 1986
- Silver Cup, awarded by The King of Norway
  Coxswain – 1918
- Silver Medals, awarded by The King of Norway
  The Tynemouth Lifeboat Crew – 1918
- Medals, awarded by The King of Norway
  The crew of the private lifeboat Tom Perry – 1918
- RNLI Bronze Medal
  Michael Campbell, Ordinary Seaman, RNVR – 1926
  Edward Selby Davidson, Honorary Secretary of the Tynemouth Branch – 1941
  George Lisle, Coxswain – 1941
  Trevor Fryer, crew member – 1974
  Frederick Arkley, crew member – 1974
- The Maud Smith Award 1986, (for the bravest act of lifesaving during the year by a member of a lifeboat crew)
  Capt. John Hogg, Coxswain – 1986
- The Thanks of the Institution inscribed on Vellum
  Trevor Fryer, Helm – 1982
- A Framed Letter of Thanks signed by the Chairman of the Institution
  Martin Kenny, Coxswain – 1998
  Kevin Mole, Helm – 2003
  Michael Nugent, Coxswain – 2022
- A Collective Letter of Thanks signed by the Chairman of the Institution
  Kevin Mole, Mechanic - 1998
  Geoffrey Cowan, Assistant Mechanic – 1998
  Edwin Chapple, crew member – 1998
  Michael Nugent, crew member – 1998
- Commendations by the Lifesaving Operations Director of the Institution
  Dan Howe, crew member – 2022
  Michael Brown, crew member – 2019, 2022
  Rob Blake, crew member – 2022
  Andrew King, crew member – 2022
  Joe Smiles, crew member – 2022
  Mark Charlton, Helm - 2019
  Mark Taylor, crew member - 2019
- American Cross of Honour for services and good seamanship
  Maj. H. E. Burton – 1916
- The Morley Medal of the Outward Bound Trust
  Kenneth Smith, crew member – 1959
- Testimonial on Parchment, awarded by the Royal Humane Society
  PC Robert Rutherford, crew member – 1959
- Member, Order of the British Empire (MBE)
  Kenneth Middlemiss, Honorary Secretary – 1993

== Roll of honour ==
In memory of those lost whilst serving Tynemouth lifeboat:

- Lost when the lifeboat Providence capsized on service to the brig Betsy, 4 December 1849.

Launcelot Burn, Coxswain
John Bone,
John Burn (Snr),
John Burn (Jnr),
John Donkin,
Robert Donkin,
John Marshall,
Thomas Marshall,
James Matson,
John Phillips,

Ralph Phillips,
William Purvis,
Ralph Shotton,
William Smith,
George Tindall,
George Tinmouth,
James Wright,
John Wright,
Henry Young
James Young

- Washed out of the lifeboat Constance and lost, on service to the schooner Friendship and the steamship Stanley, 24 November 1864
  James Grant, crew member
  E. Robson, crew member
- Washed off the pier and drowned, attempting a rescue of the barque Consul, 17 December 1872
  Robert Thirlaway Arkley, Customs Officer and lifeboat crew member (16)
- Lost when the lifeboat Northumberland was hit by a large wave, on service to the brig Gleaner, 18 December 1872
  James Watson, crew member (21)
  John Wheatley, crew member (21)

== Tynemouth lifeboats ==
=== Tyne Lifeboat Institution ===
==== South Shields, Coble Landing ====
| Name | Built | On station | Class | Comments |
|---|---|---|---|---|
| Original | 1789 | 1789–1830 | 30-foot Greathead | (Note: 30-foot x 10-foot (10-oared) Greathead-class non-self-righting lifeboat, built by Henry Greathead of South Shields, costing £150.); Wrecked in 1830. |
| Tyne | 1833 | 1833–1887 | 32-foot North Country | (Note: 32-foot x 10-foot (12-oared) North Country non-self-righting lifeboat, built by Oliver South Shields, costing £170.) |
| Providence | 1845 | 1862–1872 | 34-foot North Country | (Note: 34-foot x 10-foot 10in (14-oared) North Country non-self-righting lifeboat, built by Woodhouse of South Shields, costing £234.); At South Beach until 1862. |
| Tom Perry | 1872 | 1872–1937 | 33-foot 8in North Country | (Note: 33-foot 8in x 10-foot 8in (12-oared) North Country non-self-righting lifeboat, built by Jackson of South Shields.) |
| Bedford | 1886 | 1886–1937 | 33-foot 7in North Country | (Note: 33-foot 7in x 10-foot 8in (12-oared) North Country non-self-righting lifeboat, legacy of Miss Bedford of Pershore, built by Lancelot Lambert at the Lawe Building Yard, South Shields, costing £330.); Fitted with an engine, 1930. |

==== North Shields, Clifford's Fort ====
| Name | Built | On station | Class | Comments |
|---|---|---|---|---|
| Northumberland | 1798 | 1798–c.1846 | 28-foot Greathead | (Note: 28-foot x 9-foot 4in (10-oared) Greathead-class non-self-righting lifeboat, built by Henry Greathead of South Shields, costing £160.) |
| Northumberland | 1845 | 1845–1884 | 33-foot North Country | (Note: 33-foot x 11-foot (14-oared) North Country non-self-righting lifeboat, funded by The Duke of Northumberland, built by Thomas Anderson of North Shields, costing £200.) |
| James Young | 1884 | 1884–1941 | 32-foot North Country | (Note: 32-foot x 11-foot (12-oared) North Country non-self-righting lifeboat, funded by Harbour Dues, built by Jas. Jackson of South Shields.); Destroyed in a wartime air-raid, 10 April 1941. |

==== North Shields, Prior's Haven ====
| Name | Built | On station | Class | Comments |
|---|---|---|---|---|
| Unnamed | 1831 | 1832–1842 | 26-foot Palmer | (Note: 26-foot x 6-foot (6-oared) Palmer-class non-self-righting lifeboat, provided by the RNIPLS, built by Harton of Limehouse, London, costing £60.); Badly damaged, and scrapped in 1842. |
| Prior | 1842 | 1842–1862 | 28-foot North Country | (Note: 28-foot North Country lifeboat, built by Thomas Anderson of South Shields.); Transferred to South Beach in 1862 on arrival of RNLB Constance |

==== South Shields, South Beach ====
| Name | Built | On station | Class | Comments |
|---|---|---|---|---|
| Providence | 1845 | 1845–1862 | 34-foot North Country | (Note: 34-foot x 10-foot 10in (14-oared) North Country non-self-righting lifeboat, built by Woodhouse of South Shields, costing £234.); At South Beach until 1862. |
| Prior | 1842 | 1862–1878 | 28-foot North Country | (Note: 28-foot North Country lifeboat, built by Thomas Anderson of South Shields.); Previously at Prior's Haven |
| Willie Wouldhave | 1878 | 1878–1947 | North Country | (Note: 12-oared North Country lifeboat, built by William Jackson of South Shields.); Destroyed by arson, along with the boathouse, March 1947. |

=== Royal National Lifeboat Institution ===
==== No.1 Station (Prior's Haven) ====
| ON (Note: ON is the RNLI's Official Number of the boat.) | Name | Built | On station | Class | Comments |
|---|---|---|---|---|---|
| Pre-390 | Constance | 1862 | 1862–1864 | 33-foot Peake Self-righting (P&S) | (Note: 33-foot x 7-foot 10in (10-oared) Peake-class self-righting (P&S) lifeboat, built by Forrestt of Limehouse, London, costing £210.); Sent for repairs, 1864. |
| Pre-419 | Robert Whitworth | 1864 | 1864–1865 | 33-foot Peake Self-righting (P&S) | (Note: 33-foot x 8-foot (10-oared) Peake-class self-righting (P&S) lifeboat, funded from collection by Mr R. Whitworth of Manchester, built by Forrestt of Limehouse, London, costing £250.); Built for Bridlington, but first sent to Tynemouth on temporary cover. |
| Pre-390 | Constance | 1862 | 1865–1875 | 33-foot Peake Self-righting (P&S) | Damaged for second time in 1874, beyond repair and withdrawn. |
| Pre-604 | Charles Dibdin | 1875 | 1875–1888 | 37-foot Self-righting (P&S) | (Note: 37-foot x 9-foot (12-oared) self-righting (P&S) lifeboat, gift of the Civil Service Lifeboat Fund, built by Woolfe of Shadwell, London, costing £433.) |
| 204 | Charles Dibdin | 1888 | 1889–1905 | 37-foot Self-righting (P&S) | (Note: 37-foot x 8-foot (12-oared) self-righting (P&S) lifeboat, gift of the Civil Service Lifeboat Fund, built by D. and W. Henderson and Company of Partick, costing £495.) |

==== No.2 Station (Black Middens) ====
| ON | Name | Built | On station | Class | Comments |
|---|---|---|---|---|---|
| Pre-444 | Pomfret and Goole | 1865 | 1865–1872 | 32-foot Prowse Self-righting (P&S) | (Note: 32-foot x 7-foot 4in (10-oared) Prowse-class self-righting (P&S) lifeboat, gift of the Pontefract and Goole LB fund, built by Forrestt of Limehouse, London, costing £248.) |
| 216 | Forester | 1871 | 1872–1900 | 33-foot Self-righting (P&S) | (Note: 33-foot x 8-foot 1in (10-oared) self-righting (P&S) lifeboat, gift of the Ancient Order of Foresters, built by Forrestt of Limehouse, London, costing £278.) |
| 455 | Forester | 1900 | 1900–1905 | 34-foot Rubie Self-righting (P&S) | (Note: 34-foot x 8-foot 4in (10-oared) Dungeness-class (Rubie) self-righting (P&S) lifeboat, gift of the Ancient Order of Foresters, built by Thames Ironworks of Blackwall, London, costing £712.) |

Pre ON numbers are unofficial numbers used by the Lifeboat Enthusiasts' Society to reference early lifeboats not included on the official RNLI list.

==== All-weather motor lifeboats (Clifford's Fort and Fish Quay) ====
| ON | Op. No. (Note: Op. No. is the RNLI's Operational Number of the boat carried on the hull.) | Name | Built | On station | Class | Comments |
|---|---|---|---|---|---|---|
| 343 | – | J. McConnell Hussey | 1892 | 1905–1911 | 38-foot Self-righting (Motor) | Moored afloat |
| 613 | – | Henry Vernon | 1910 | 1911–1918 | 40-foot Self-righting (motor) | |
| 646 | – | Henry Frederick Swan | 1917 | 1918–1939 | 40-foot Self-righting (motor) | |
| 824 | – | John Pymont | 1939 | 1939–1941 | 41-foot Watson | Destroyed in a wartime air-raid, 1941 |
| 646 | – | Henry Frederick Swan | 1917 | 1941–1947 | 40-foot Self-righting (motor) | |
| 852 | – | Tynsider | 1947 | 1947–1979 | 46-foot 9in Watson | |
| 945 | – | Princess Alexandra of Kent | 1958 | 1979–1980 | 52-foot Barnett (Mk.II) | Previously at Torbay. |
| 1061 | 52-13 | George and Olive Turner | 1979 | 1980–1999 | Arun | |
| 1242 | 17-20 | Spirit of Northumberland | 1999 | 1999–2021 | Severn | |
| 1263 | 17-34 | Osier | 2002 | 2021– | Severn | Previously in the Relief fleet. |
| 1299 | 16-19 | Irene Muriel Rees | 2011 | tbc | Tamar | Previously at Walton and Frinton. Due on service at Tynemouth in 2026. |

More post-service details can be found on the respective lifeboat class pages.

==== Inshore lifeboats ====
| Op. No. | Name | On station | Class | Comments |
|---|---|---|---|---|
| D-12 | Unnamed | 1965 | D-class (RFD PB16) | |
| D-49 | Unnamed | 1965–1966 | D-class (RFD PB16) | |
| D-50 | Unnamed | 1966–1968 | D-class (RFD PB16) | |
| D-144 | Unnamed | 1969–1970 | D-class (RFD PB16) | |
| D-172 | Unnamed | 1970–1981 | D-class (RFD PB16) | |
| D-280 | Unnamed | 1981–1989 | D-class (Zodiac III) | |
| D-385 | Unnamed | 1989–1998 | D-class (EA16) | |
| D-535 | The Cromer Smuggler | 1998–2008 | D-class (EA16) | |
| D-693 | Mark Noble | 2008–2018 | D-class (IB1) | |
| D-829 | Little Susie | 2018– | D-class (IB1) | |

== See also ==
- List of RNLI stations
- List of former RNLI stations
- Royal National Lifeboat Institution lifeboats
