= Ramsgate-class lifeboat =

Class overview
- Name: Ramsgate-class
- Builders: S. E. Saunders, Cowes; J. Samuel White, Cowes
- Operators: Royal National Lifeboat Institution; ADES Uruguay; Bote Salvavidas de Valparaíso, Chile
- Preceded by: Norfolk and Suffolk-class
- Succeeded by: 46ft 9in Watson-class
- Cost: £8,500
- Built: 1925–1928
- In service: 1925–1998
- Completed: 3
- Retired: 3

General characteristics
- Displacement: 21–23 tons
- Length: ON 697: 48 ft (15 m); ON 704/5: 48 ft 6 in (14.78 m)
- Beam: 13 ft (4.0 m)
- Propulsion: ON 697: 1 x 80 bhp Weyburn DE6 6-cyl. petrol; ON 704/5: 2 x 40 bhp Weyburn CE4 4-cyl. petrol
- Speed: 8 knots (9.2 mph)
- Crew: 9

The Ramsgate-class motor lifeboat was a special design produced by the RNLI for three stations covering the Thames estuary and required to operate in shallow waters.

== History ==
Designed at a time when the RNLI was happy to build special boats for the particular needs of individual stations, the Ramsgate-class (named after the first station to operate one) was essentially an amalgam of Norfolk and Suffolk and Watson design principles intended for the shallow waters of the Thames estuary.

The first boat, RNLB Prudential (ON 697), was 48 feet (15 m) long and single engined. The other two were 6 inches (15 cm) longer and twin engined. All three had long careers at their respective stations but when they were replaced between 1953 and 1955, it was with standard 46ft 9in Watson boats.

== Description ==
The first Ramsgate was an open design with no cockpits and low end boxes. Powered by a single 80-bhp Weyburn built DE6 6-cylinder petrol engine driving a single screw, the boat retained an auxiliary sailing rig as well as six oars.

The other two boats were substantially redesigned, being six inches (15 cm) longer and powered by two 40-bhp Weyburn built CE4 4-cylinder petrol engines driving twin screws. The sailing rig was much reduced and the boats had a shelter ahead of the cockpit covering the engine controls. Just ahead of this was a funnel for engine exhaust.

== Fleet ==
ON (Note: ON is the RNLI's Official Number of the boat.)	Name	Built	In service	Station	Comments
697	Prudential	1925	1925–1953	Ramsgate	(Note: Gift of Prudential Assurance Co., built by S. E. Saunders of Cowes, with a single 80-hp Weyburn DE6 6-cyl petrol engine, costing £8,417.) Sold November 1953. Renamed Trimilia, at Ipswich Haven Marina, October 2023.
704	Greater London (Civil Service No.3)	1928	1928–1941	Southend-on-Sea	(Note: Gift of the Civil Service Lifeboat Fund, built by J. Samuel White of Cowes, with twin 40-hp Weyburn CE4 4-cyl petrol engines, costing £8,668.) Sold September 1957. Renamed ADES 1 Francisco Alvarez with ADES Uruguay. See below.
704	Greater London (Civil Service No.3)	1928	1941–1945	Reserve fleet	Sold September 1957. Renamed ADES 1 Francisco Alvarez with ADES Uruguay. See below.
704	Greater London (Civil Service No.3)	1928	1945–1955	Southend-on-Sea	Sold September 1957. Renamed ADES 1 Francisco Alvarez with ADES Uruguay. See below.
704	Greater London (Civil Service No.3)	1928	1955–1957	Reserve fleet	Sold September 1957. Renamed ADES 1 Francisco Alvarez with ADES Uruguay. See below.
705	E.M.E.D.	1928	1928–1953	Walton and Frinton	(Note: Legacies of Mr Dewhirst, Miss Yates, Mr Barnes and Miss Watkins, built by J. Samuel White of Cowes, with twin 40-hp Weyburn CE4 4-cyl petrol engines, costing £8,700.) Sold January 1956. Renamed Capitán Christiansen, with Bote Salvavidas de Valparaíso, Chile. See below.
705	E.M.E.D.	1928	1953–1955	Reserve fleet	Sold January 1956. Renamed Capitán Christiansen, with Bote Salvavidas de Valparaíso, Chile. See below.

== Other fleets ==
RNLI ON (Note: ON is the RNLI's Official Number of the boat.)	Name	Built	In service	Station	Comments
704	ADES 1 Francisco Alvarez; (ADES Uruguay)	1928	1957–1991	Montevideo; Uruguay	Retired September 1991. In storage at Ercna UTU, Carmelo, Uruguay, December 2025
705	Capitán Christiansen (Bote Salvavidas de Valparaiso)	1928	1955–1998	Valparaíso, Chile	Retired 1998. On display at Chile National Maritime Museum, Valparaíso, December 2025.

== See also ==
- Royal National Lifeboat Institution lifeboats
