= Four Wheel Drive RNLI tractor =

RNLI Amphibious launch tractor

FWD RNLI tractor
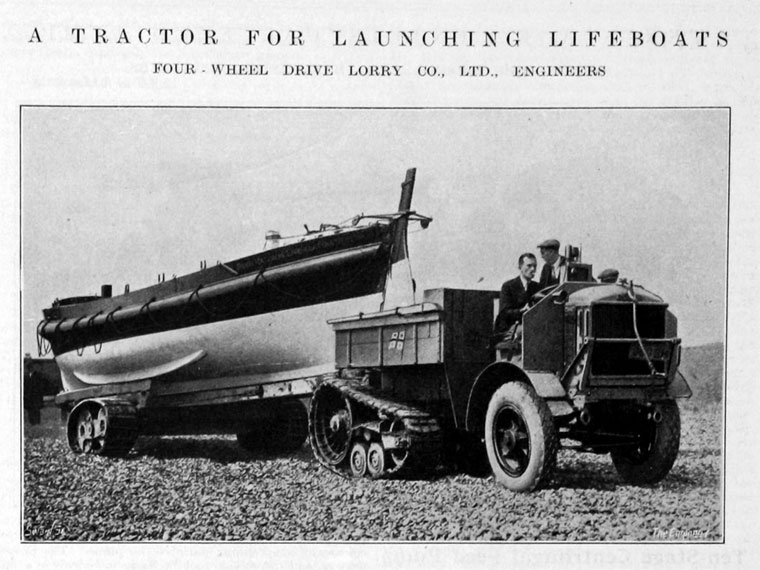
- Four Wheel Drive (FWD) RNLI tractor
- Manufacturer: FWD
- Production: 4 (1927–1930)
- Weight: 11 tonnes with trailer
- Propulsion: Tracks
- Engine model: 4-cylinder
- Gross power: 60 hp (45 kW)
- Drawbar pull: 15,000 lb (6,800 kg)
- Speed: 12 mph (19 km/h)
- Preceded by: Clayton
- Succeeded by: Case L

The FWD RNLI tractor was a Half-track amphibious launch tractor, specifically adapted for the Royal National Lifeboat Institution (RNLI), to launch and recover carriage mounted lifeboats, from beach-launched lifeboat stations.

A total of just four 4 tractors were constructed for the RNLI by FWD of Slough, Berkshire, between 1927 and 1930.

== History ==
Following the end of World War I, the RNLI turned its attentions to making it easier to launch shore based lifeboats. Eighteen caterpillar tracked 35-hp tractors were supplied by Clayton and Shuttleworth.

However, the first tractors proved unsuccessful on shingle or very soft mud, and the RNLI continued to look for a solution. In 1927, a new launch tractor was designed for the RNLI by the Four Wheel Drive (FWD) company of Slough. The vehicle was a half-track, with wheels at the front, and a "Roadless Traction creeper track" at the rear. The vehicle was marinised, with the carburettor and magneto in a water-tight casing. The vehicle had a much more powerful 60-hp engine, and was capable of 12 mph (19 km/h). Launching involved towing the lifeboat to a suitable depth of water for the boat to float, and then towing the boat from the carriage by means of a winch on the tractor.

The inauguration of the first tractor was a grand affair, and took place on Friday 10 June 1927 at the Four Wheel Drive Lorry Company premises on Slough Trading Estate. Over 3000 people attended the event, including many school children, having been given a half-day holiday. Guests included the mayor and mayoress of Windsor, the Dean of Windsor, and many RNLI and company officials, including Sir Godfrey Baring, Bt, chairman of the RNLI committee of management. Girl Guides provided a guard of honour, with help provided by members of the The Scout Association and Boys' Brigade, and music provided by the Band of the Licenced Victuallers School.

Following the arrival of Princess Victoria, the new tractor emerged from the factory towing a lifeboat, crewed by men from Boulmer, Hoylake and Southend-on-Sea. After a service of dedication by the Rt. Rev. Philip H. Eliott, Bishop of Buckingham, Capt. Howard F. Rowley CBE, RN, Chief Inspector of Lifeboats, gave a description of the vehicle and its capabilities. Princess Victoria then broke a bottle of champagne over the radiator, and named the tractor Princess Victoria.

- 1927 UK: Lifeboat Tractor naming by Princess Victoria

Early the following day, Saturday, the tractor was dispatched by rail to New Romney in Kent, for trials on the shingle beach; its tracks proving unsuitable for a long road trip. The lifeboat, however, was hauled to the site by road, towed by one of the Four Wheel Drive Company lorries, arriving there on Sunday afternoon.

Trials took place over three days, and soon highlighted areas of deficiency. Having undertaken to provide the vehicle at their expense, the tractor was returned to FWD for modifications. The frame was strengthened, with closed sprockets replacing open ones on the creeper tracks. A new reduction gear was fitted, improving the drawbar pull from 6,250 lb (2,830 kg) to 15,000 lb (6,800 kg).

The tractor was subsequently trialled again at New Romney, at Boulmer, and finally at Hoylake. Occasional difficulties were encountered pulling the whole unit with trailer and lifeboat, but were overcome by taking the tractor to firmer ground, and then hauling the trailer and lifeboat back to the tractor by winch. In tests at Boulmer at low tide, the lifeboat was hauled 1/3 mi (0.54 km) to the water, plus a further 100 yd (91 m) to get water depth. The time taken from leaving the boathouse until launch was just 24 minutes. Following successful trials at Hoylake in 1928, the tractor was immediately placed there on service, replacing the Clayton unit.

Despite the apparent early success, just four units were placed with the RNLI, the last supplied in 1930. The tractors operated at six different lifeboat stations until the early to mid 1950s. It is reported that the British division of FWD was not well supported by its Wisconsin parent, and entered into a partnership with AEC on 31 October 1929.

There would be a gap of seven years before the RNLI commissioned new tractors, this time employing highly modified Case L, and later Case LA, tractors.

At this time, no examples of the FWD RNLI tractor are known to survive.

== FWD RNLI tractor fleet ==
Op. No. (Note: Op. No. is the RNLI's Operational Number carried on the hull.)	Reg No.	Built	In service	Station	Comments
T23	PP 7515	1927	1927–1929	Hoylake	Named Princess Victoria
T23	PP 7515	1927	1929–1951	Clogherhead	Named Princess Victoria
T23	PP 7515	1927	1951–1952	Depot	Named Princess Victoria
T24	UW 2641	1929	1929–1949	Hoylake	
T24	UW 2641	1929	1950	Depot (spares)	
T25	UW 3881	1930	1930–1932	Newburgh	
T25	UW 3881	1930	1932–1948	Bridlington	
T25	UW 3881	1930	1949–1955	Scarborough	
T26	UW 3882	1929	1930–1954	Boulmer	

== See also ==
- New Holland TC45 launch tractor
- Talus MB-764 launch tractor
- Talus MB-H launch tractor
- Talus MB-4H launch tractor
- Talus Atlantic 85 DO-DO launch carriage
- Fowler Challenger III amphibious tractor
- Clayton RNLI tractor
