= Bridlington Lifeboat Station =

RNLI Lifeboat station in the East Riding of Yorkshire, England

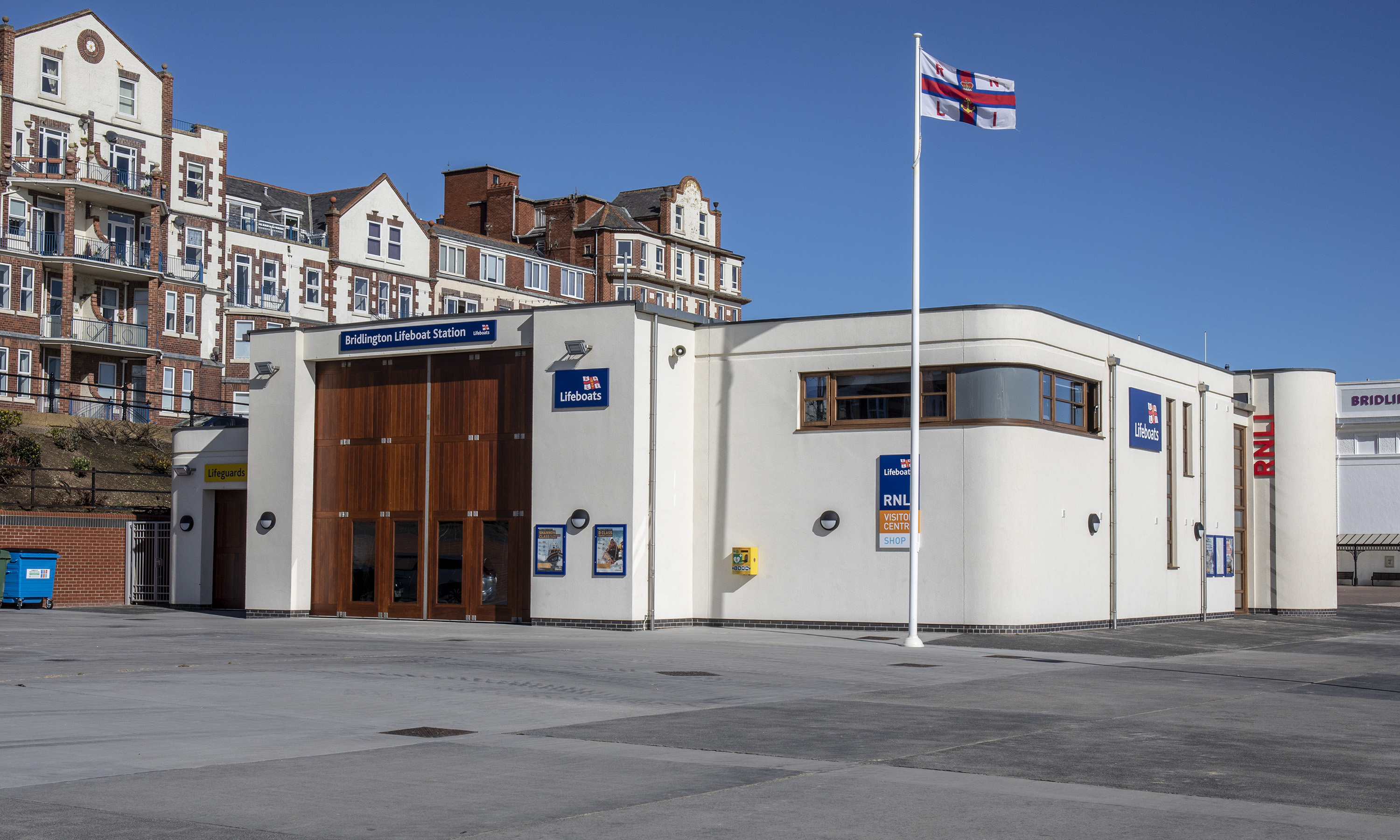
- Bridlington Lifeboat Station from the south

- Location within East Riding of Yorkshire
- Former names: Bridlington Quay Lifeboat Station

General information
- Type: RNLI Lifeboat Station
- Location: Bridlington Lifeboat Station, The Spa Promenade, Bridlington, East Riding of Yorkshire, YO15 3JH, England
- Coordinates: 54.0785°N 0.1978°W
- Opened: 2017
- Cost: £3 million
- Owner: Royal National Lifeboat Institution

Website
- Bridlington RNLI Lifeboat Station

Bridlington Lifeboat Station is a Royal National Lifeboat Institution (RNLI) lifeboat station based in Bridlington, East Riding of Yorkshire, England. Having been instituted in 1805, it is the oldest working RNLI lifeboat location in the Yorkshire and the Humber region.

A new lifeboat station was opened closer to the sea in September 2017, replacing an older facility built in 1903. There are two lifeboats based at Bridlington; a Shannon-class All-weather Lifeboat (ALB), 13-22 Antony Patrick Jones (ON 1329), and a D-class (IB1) Inshore lifeboat Ernie Wellings (D-852).

== History ==
In 1804, the residents of Bridlington raised the £150 needed to pay for a lifeboat, which became operational in 1805 with the first lifeboat house recorded as being operational in 1806. In December 1852, the local committee in charge of the boat relinquished control to the RNLI after they took the decision not to launch during bad weather. This was seen as the wrong decision, as three men on a stricken ship drowned, and so the committee decided the best option was to transfer control to the RNLI.

A lifeboat station was built near to the harbour, but was vacated in 1903 in favour of a new build slightly to the south along Marine Drive.

In 1871, a huge storm hit the east coast of England and became known as the Great Gale of 1871. Many boats were wrecked, including The Harbinger, a private lifeboat which is sometimes erroneously referred to as an RNLI boat. The storm took its toll on dozens of ships, which were trying to stay safe in Bridlington Bay, which was sometimes referred to as the Bay of Safety. Between 70 and 150 people died, including six members of the lifeboat crew from The Harbinger. At the time, the RNLI boat was known as the Institution Boat and The Harbinger was known as the Fishermen's Boat. After the gale, it was commented upon by some, that the design of The Harbinger led to its capsizing. A local benefactor paid for a new boat (The Seagull), of a new design and paid for a lifeboathouse to accommodate it, something that The Harbinger never had and she later became weathered after being exposed to the elements.

Between 1884 and 1898, there was as secondary lifeboat in the village of Barmston some 6 miles (9.7 km) to the south of Bridlington. This was crewed by the RNLI men from Bridlington, though how long it would take them to reach the lifeboathouse at Barmston from Bridlington is unknown.

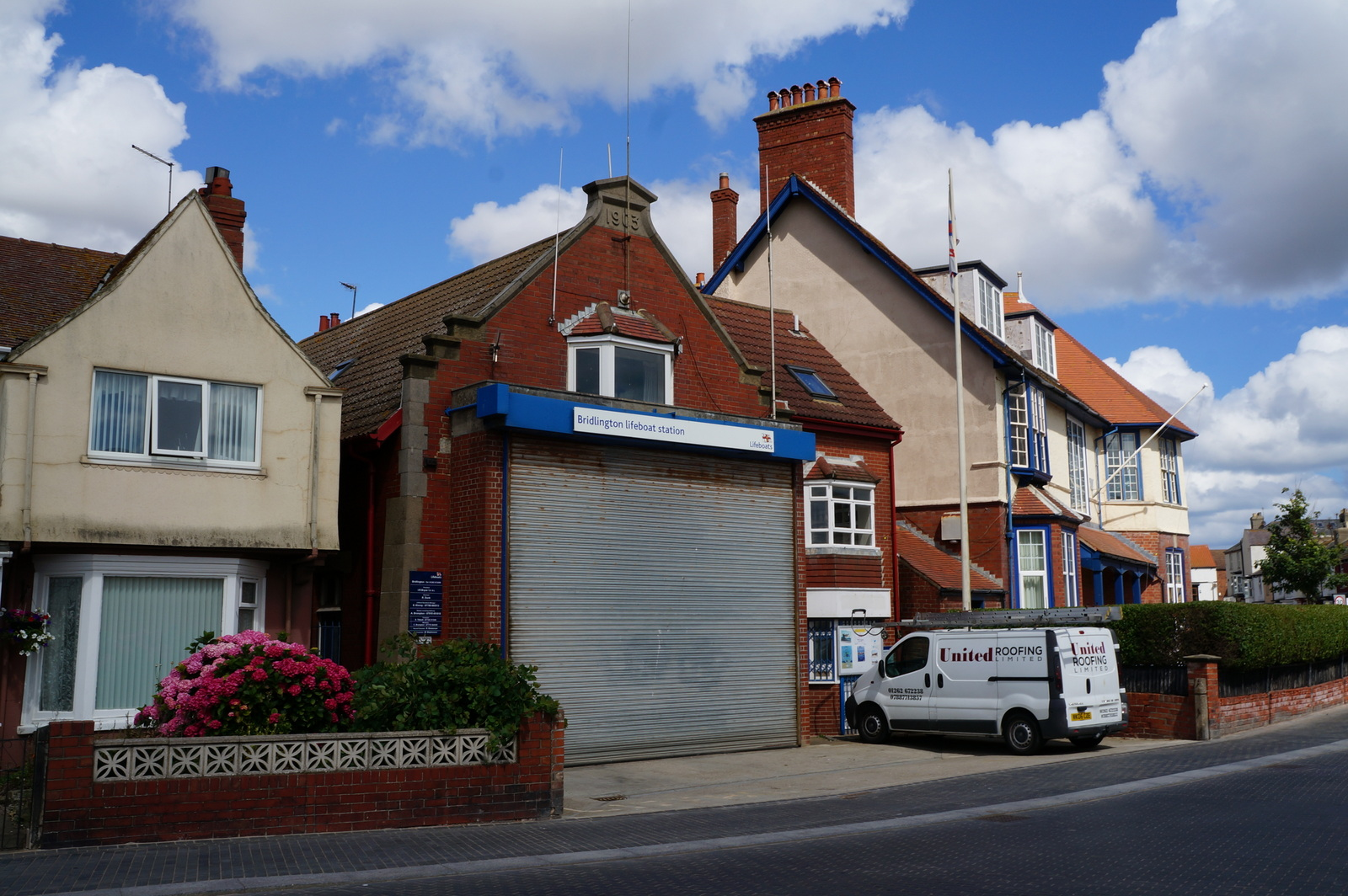
1903 Bridlington Lifeboat Station

A lifeboat station was opened in 1903 on South Marine Drive, and in 1921, along with Boulmer Lifeboat Station, Bridlington undertook trials in launching lifeboats across open beaches into water with the aid of a specially adapted tractor.

In 2017, the previous lifeboat station on South Marine Drive in the town, was replaced with a larger facility on the seashore which enabled the RNLI to house both their All-Weather Lifeboat (ALB) and their Inshore Lifeboat (ILB) in the same facility. Previous to this, the ILB was housed in a separate facility from the ALB. The new build lifeboat station also allows the launch vehicle and boat to stay permanently fixed when not in use. This allows for a speedier deployment into the sea when an emergency call is made.

== Notable launches ==
=== Great Gale of 1871 ===
The Bridlington RNLI Lifeboat was launched many times and rescued 16 people from three wrecked ships. The local rescue boat, Harbinger, a gift from Count Gustave Batthyany, also took to the sea and rescued sailors, but capsized and six of her crew of nine were drowned.

=== Seagull Lifeboat (1898) ===
After the sinking of The Harbinger, a private donation paid for a second lifeboat (outwith of the RNLI's responsibility) which was called The Seagull. This operated in conjunction with the RNLI lifeboat until 25 March 1898, when the RNLI were called out to rescue the crew of The Seagull. The Seagull had been dashed against the sea-wall and ropes had been thrown to aid the crew. One of the RNLI crewman who had been decorated for his bravery during the Great Gale of 1871, drowned during the rescue.

=== March 1915 ===
Whilst the lifeboat was being launched to go to a stricken Minesweeper in Bridlington bay, one of the carriage horse riders was knocked off his horse, swept out to sea and drowned. Two of the horses and all twelve sailors aboard the minesweeper drowned too.

=== The Tillie Morrison, Sheffield (1952) ===
On 19 August 1952, two girls, Joan Ellis and Gillian Fox, were swimming in the sea off the coast at Flamborough when they got into difficulties. The Flamborough lifeboat could not be launched as its slipway was under repair, so the Bridlington lifeboat, the Tillie Morrison, Sheffield was launched instead. Unfortunately, both girls drowned and during the search, and the lifeboat was capsized by rough seas, killing one of the lifeboatmen, bowman Robert Redhead. It was later speculated that the Bridlington lifeboat crew were unfamiliar with the area they were searching, and so were not aware of the dangerous waters around Flamborough Head. A plaque at Thornwick Bay commemorates the tragedy.

== Station honours ==
The following are awards made at Bridlington.

- RNIPLS Silver Medal
  John Usher, Landlord of the Tiger Inn, and Coxswain – 1828
  George Gray – 1834
- RNLI Silver Medal
  Thomas Frankish, 'a youth' – 1865
  Henry Hutchinson, fisherman – 1890
  Christopher Brown, fisherman – 1893
  Fred Brown, son of Christopher – 1893
  Thomas Clark, fisherman – 1893
  Richard Purvi, fisherman – 1893
  John Usher, fisherman – 1893
  John Edward King, Coxswain – 1973
- RNLI Bronze Medal
  John Edward King, Coxswain – 1968
  John Edward King, Coxswain – 1972 (Second-Service clasp)
  Fred Walkington, Coxswain – 1979
  Fred Walkington, Coxswain – 2000 (Second Service Clasp)
  Andrew Brompton, Assistant Mechanic – 2000
- The Thanks of the Institution inscribed on Vellum
  John Edward King, Coxswain – 1967
  H. T. Wood – 1967
  Bridlington Lifeboat Crew – 1968
  John Edward King, Coxswain – 1969
  Fred Walkington, crew member – 1970
  George William Traves, crew member – 1973
  Denis Atkins, crew member – 1973
  Roderick William Stott, crew member – 1973
  Anthony John Ayre, crew member – 1973
  Fred Walkington, crew member – 1973
  Kenneth Bently crew member – 1973
  Fred Walkington, Coxswain – 1980
  Arthur W. Dick, Honorary Secretary – 1983
  Fred Walkington, Coxswain – 1985
  Andrew Brompton, Helm – 1986
  Adrian Trower, Helm – 2006
- A Framed Letter of Thanks signed by the Chairman of the Institution
  R Cooper – 1967
  Bridlington Lifeboat Crew – 1969
  Coxswain John Edward King and the five remaining crew members – 1970
  John Edward King, Coxswain – 1972
  K. Bentley, crew member – 1972
  Andrew Brompton, Helm – 1989
  Andrew Day, Helm – 2000
  Duncan Stewart, Helm – 2004
- Member, Order of the British Empire (MBE)
  Fred Walkington, Retired Coxswain – 2001NYH
  Roland Stork, Former Coxswain – 2004QBH
  Andrew Phillip Rodgers, Volunteer Coxswain – 2025KBH
- British Empire Medal
  Richard Dunk, President and former chairman – 2019QBH
  Frank Cook, Boathouse Manager – 2025KBH

== Roll of honour ==
In memory of those lost whilst serving Bridlington lifeboats.

- Lost when the private lifeboat Harbinger capsized in the Great Gale, 9 February 1871
  Richard Atkin (45)
  John Snarr Clappison (21)
  William Cobb (20)
  Robert Pickering (34)
  David Purdon (38)
  James Watson (43)
- Drowned whilst attempting to assist the crew of the private lifeboat Seagull, 25 March 1898
  Christopher Brown (57)
- Washed away and drowned during the launch of the lifeboat to Minesweeper No. 847, 18 March 1915
  Robert Carr, Bridlington Corporation Horse Rider (65)
- Injured when the lifeboat Tillie Morrison Sheffield (ON 851) capsized, and died soon afterwards, 19 August 1952
  Robert P. Redhead, Bowman (55)
- Collapsed and died at home shortly after returning from service to the yacht Alert, 18 May 1964
  Jack Shippey, Asst. Mechanic (53)

== Bridlington lifeboats ==
=== Pulling and Sailing (P&S) lifeboats ===
| ON (Note: ON is the RNLI's Official Number of the boat.) | Name | Built | On station | Class | Comments |
|---|---|---|---|---|---|
| – | Unknown | 1805 | 1805–1824 | 30-foot Greathead | (Note: 30-foot x 10-foot (12-oared) North Country lifeboat, built by Henry Greathead of South Shields, costing £150.); Cost defrayed by Lloyd's of London |
| Pre-093 | Unknown | 1824 | 1824–1865 | 28-foot North Country | (Note: 28-foot x 8-foot 9in (12-oared) North Country lifeboat, built by Skelton of Scarborough, costing £120.) |
| Pre-419 | Robert Whitworth | 1864 | 1865–1866 | 33-foot Peake Self-righting (P&S) | (Note: 33-foot x 8-foot (10-oared) Peake-class self-righting (P&S) lifeboat, funded by the collection of Mr R. Whitworth of Manchester, built by Forrestt of Limehouse, London, costing £250.); Temporarily at Tynemouth before arrival in Bridlington. |
| Pre-460 | Robert Whitworth | 1866 | 1866–1871 | 32-foot Prowse Self-righting (P&S) | (Note: 32-foot x 7-foot 4in (10-oared) Prowse-class self-righting (P&S) lifeboat, funded by the Manchester branch of the RNLI, built by Forrestt of Limehouse, London, costing £230.); Wrecked in the Great Gale of 1871. |
| Pre-560 | John Abbott | 1871 | 1871–1885 | 34-foot Self-righting (P&S) | (Note: 34-foot x 7-foot 8in (10-oared) self-righting (P&S) lifeboat, legacy of Mr J. Abbott of Halifax, built by Forrestt of Limehouse, London, costing £264.) |
| 9 | William John and Francis (Note: Spellings vary between Frances and Francis.) | 1885 | 1885–1898 | 34-foot 1in Self-righting (P&S) | (Note: 34-foot 1in x 7-foot 6in (10-oared) self-righting (P&S) lifeboat, legacy of Mr W. J. Payne of Reigate, built by Woolfe of Shadwell, London, costing £300.) |
| 10 | George and Jane Walker | 1884 | 1898–1899 | 34-foot Self-righting (P&S) | (Note: 34-foot x 7-foot 6in (10-oared) self-righting (P&S) lifeboat, legacy of Mr G. Walker of Southport, built by Forrestt of Limehouse, London, costing £295.); Specially designed for Barmston, where it spent 14 years before the station closed in 1898. |
| 433 | George and Jane Walker | 1899 | 1899–1931 | 35-foot Self-righting (P&S) | (Note: 35-foot x 8-foot 3in (10-oared) self-righting (P&S) lifeboat, legacy of Mr G. Walker of Southport, built by Thames Ironworks of Blackwall, London, costing £733.) |

Pre ON numbers are unofficial numbers used by the Lifeboat Enthusiasts' Society to reference early lifeboats not included on the official RNLI list.

=== Motor lifeboats ===
| ON | Op. No. (Note: Op. No. is the RNLI's Operational Number of the boat carried on the hull.) | Name | On station | Class | Comments |
|---|---|---|---|---|---|
| 747 | – | Stanhope Smart | 1931–1947 | 35ft 6in Self-righting motor | |
| 851 | – | Tillie Morrison Sheffield | 1947–1953 | 35ft 6in Self-righting motor | |
| 914 | – | Tillie Morrison Sheffield II | 1953–1967 | Liverpool | |
| 980 | – | William Henry and Mary King | 1967–1988 | Oakley | |
| 1124 | 12-001 | Peggy and Alex Caird | 1988–1995 | Mersey | |
| 1169 | 12-12 | Marine Engineer | 1995–2017 | Mersey | |
| 1329 | 13-22 | Anthony Patrick Jones | 2017– | Shannon | Named by Dr John Sentamu, Archbishop of York, in April 2018 |

=== Inshore lifeboats ===
| Op. No. | Name | On station | Class | Comments |
|---|---|---|---|---|
| D-92 | Unnamed | 1966–1970 | D-class (RFD PB16) | |
| D-188 | The Lord Feoffees | 1971–1983 | D-class (RFD PB16) | |
| D-299 | The Lord Feoffees | 1984–1992 | D-class (RFD PB16) | |
| D-426 | Lords Feoffees II | 1992–2000 | D-class (EA16) | |
| D-557 | Lords Feoffees III | 2000–2009 | D-class (EA16) | |
| D-721 | Windsor Spirit | 2009–2021 | D-class (IB1) | |
| D-852 | Ernie Wellings | 2021– | D-class (IB1) | |

=== Launch and recovery tractors ===
| Op. No. | Reg. No. | Type | On station | Comments |
|---|---|---|---|---|
| T11 | BT 4414 | Clayton | 1921–1922 | |
| T5 | IJ 3424 | Clayton | 1922–1930 | |
| T16 | YW 3377 | Clayton | 1930–1932 | |
| T25 | UW 3881 | FWD Co. | 1932–1948 | |
| T42 | JXR 933 | Case LA | 1948–1954 | |
| T62 | PLA 698 | Fowler Challenger III | 1954–1965 | |
| T58 | OJJ 312 | Fowler Challenger III | 1965–1974 | |
| T60 | OXO 323 | Fowler Challenger III | 1974–1978 | |
| T87 | XA 9192 | Talus MBC Case 1150B | 1978–1986 | |
| T100 | D466 RAW | Talus MB-H Crawler | 1986–1998 | |
| T108 | F133 FUJ | Talus MB-H Crawler | 1998–2000 | |
| T101 | D335 SUJ | Talus MB-H Crawler | 2000–2008 | |
| T120 | P514 HAW | Talus MB-H Crawler | 2008–2017 | |
| SC-T09 | HF65 HUA | SLARS (Supacat) | 2017–2019 | |
| SC-T15 | LK18 FVU | SLARS (SC Innovation) | 2019– | |

== See also ==
- List of RNLI stations
- List of former RNLI stations
- Royal National Lifeboat Institution lifeboats
