= Barmston Lifeboat Station =

Former RNLI lifeboat station in the East Riding of Yorkshire, England

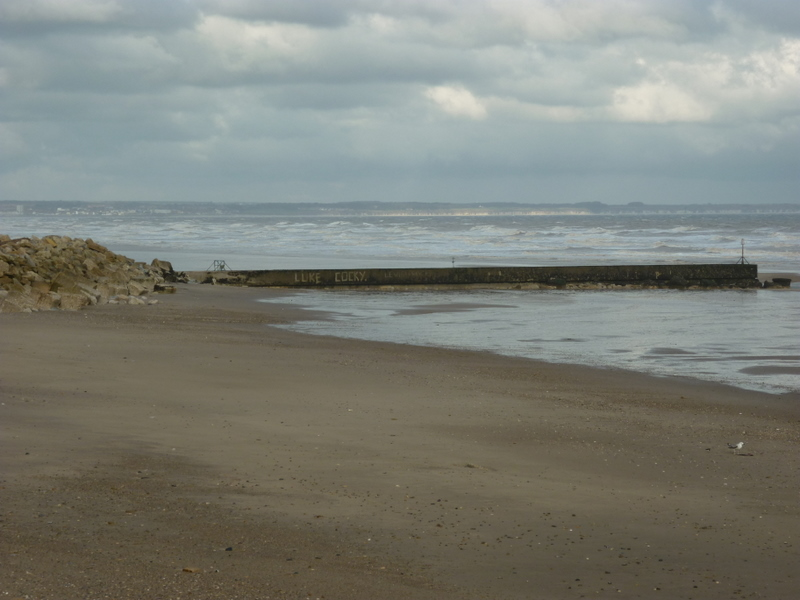
- Former location of Barmston Lifeboat House

- Barmston, East Riding of Yorkshire

General information
- Status: Closed
- Type: RNLI Lifeboat Station
- Location: Horse Bridge, Barmston Main Drain, Barmston, East Riding of Yorkshire, England
- Coordinates: 54°00′38.7″N 0°12′49.5″W
- Opened: 1884
- Closed: 1898

Barmston Lifeboat Station was located near to Horse Bridge, on Southfield Lane, at the end of Barmston Main Drain, approximately 1/4 mile (0.40 km) to the south east of Barmston, on the coast of the East Riding of Yorkshire.

A lifeboat was first stationed at Barmston in 1884, by the Royal National Lifeboat Institution (RNLI).

Barmston lifeboat station was closed in 1898.

== History ==
On 6 March 1883, the brig Matchless was wrecked off Barmston whilst en route to London from Seaham, County Durham. All hands were lost.

This was only one of a number of vessels lost on the East Yorkshire coast, over a period of just 12 years. The area of coast to the south of Bridlington was known as the Bay of Refuge, where ships would shelter in times of bad weather.

In the Great Gale of 1871, the weather turned, and many ships sheltering from the storm were driven onto the East Riding coast and wrecked. Just around Barmston, these included the vessels William Maitland, Squirrel, Lavinia, Endeavour, Spinney, Agility, Bebside, Windsor, Yare, and Worthy.

The wreck of the Matchless would prompt a request from Bridlington Lifeboat Station, for a lifeboat to be placed at Barmston. Capt. Nepean, District Inspector of Lifeboats, visited the site in April 1883, and following his report, a new station was agreed. A legacy of £3,100 had been received from the estate of Mr. George Walker of Southport, specifically for the provision of a lifeboat on the Yorkshire coast, and was appropriated to Barmston.

Land was provided by Sir Henry Somerville Boynton, Bt., and a boathouse was constructed near Horse Bridge on Barmston Main Drain by W. J. Renard, at a cost of £420-8s-2d. A 34-foot 1in self-righting 'pulling and sailing' (P&S) lifeboat, one with oars and sails, was built by Forrestt of Limehouse, and along with a carriage and gear, was forwarded by rail on 16 July 1884. At a ceremony in September 1884, the station was officially opened, and the boat was named George and Jane Walker (ON 10).

Richard Purvis was appointed Coxswain, and Alfred West appointed Honorary Secretary. With the boat in a remote location, when required, it would launch with the lifeboat crew from Bridlington, who would be transported the 6 miles (9.7 km) to Barmston.

The Bridlington lifeboatmen were assembled on 20 October 1889, after the schooner Kate of St Ives was seen in difficulties. They were transported to Barmston in two wagonettes, hired at a cost of £2-10s-0d, but the vessel recovered, and the lifeboat wasn't launched. Similarly on 3 March 1892, the vessel recovered, and the lifeboat wasn't launched. Finally, the lifeboat was launched on 31 January 1897, to the aid of the Norwegian barque Ingha, aground 4 miles (6.4 km) south of Bridlington, but on arrival, found the vessel had re-floated and required no assistance.

On 25 March 1898, Bridlington's own lifeboat, William, John & Frances (ON 9) was badly damaged, and had to be withdrawn from service. The Barmston lifeboat was temporarily relocated to Bridlington. However, on 12 May 1898, it was decided that with only three calls, one launch, and no lives saved, over a period of 14 years, the Barmston Lifeboat Station would be closed with immediate effect.

The George and Jane Walker (ON 10) would remain on service at Bridlington, until she was replaced in October 1899 and sold. It was reported that the boathouse at Barmston was lost to coastal erosion, but the site still exists. The building is demolished, but some foundations may still remain.

== Barmston lifeboat ==
ON (Note: ON is the RNLI's Official Number of the boat.)	Name	Built	On station	Class	Comments
10	George and Jane Walker	1884	1884–1898	34-foot Self-righting (P&S)	(Note: 34-foot x 7-foot 6in (10-oared) self-righting (P&S) lifeboat, legacy of Mr G. Walker of Southport, built by Forrestt of Limehouse, London, costing £295.)

== See also ==
- List of RNLI stations
- List of former RNLI stations
- Royal National Lifeboat Institution lifeboats
