= RNLB Keith Anderson =

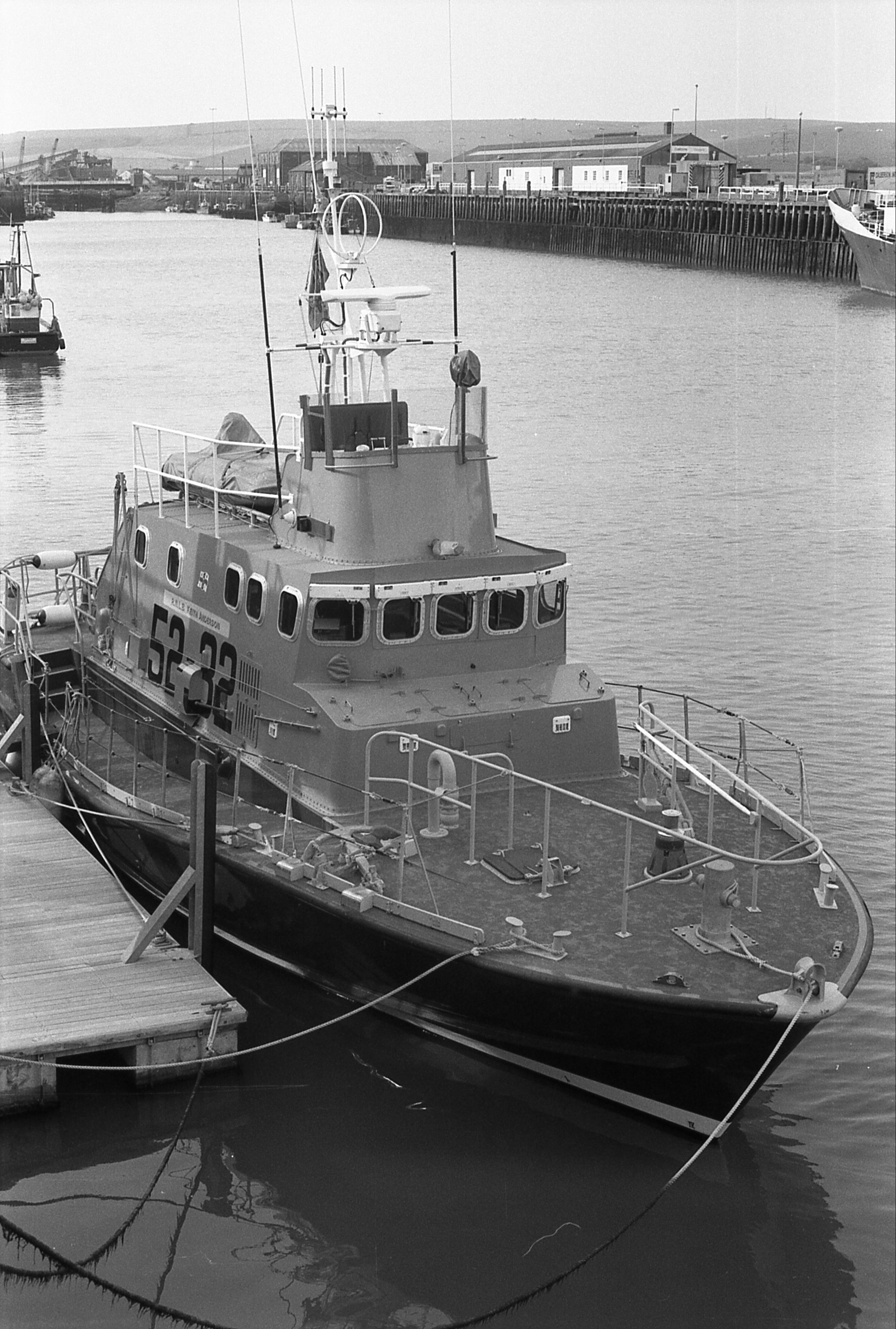
- RNLB Keith Anderson (ON 1106)

History

British RNLI Flag
- Owner: Royal National Lifeboat Institution (RNLI)
- Builder: VT Halmatic
- Official Number: ON 1106
- Donor: Gift of Mrs Esme Anderson Grosvenor Square, London
- Cost: £394,928
- Yard number: WO 2790
- Laid down: 1984
- Launched: 1985
- Christened: 27 May 1986 by Mrs Esme Anderson
- Completed: 1985
- Acquired: 1985
- In service: 1985 - 2003
- Home port: Newhaven (1985 – 1999); Relief Fleet (1999 – 2000); Hartlepool (2000 – 2003)
- Fate: Sold out of fleet in 2006 to China Rescue & Salvage Bureau

General characteristics
- Class & type: Arun-class
- Type: Motor lifeboat
- Displacement: 32 long tons (33 t)
- Length: 54 ft (16 m) overall
- Beam: 17 ft (5.2 m)
- Draught: 5 ft (1.5 m)
- Propulsion: 2 × Caterpillar 460 hp (343 kW) diesel engines
- Speed: 18.5 knots (21.3 mph; 34.3 km/h)
- Range: 250 nmi (460 km)
- Crew: 6

RNLB Keith Anderson, officially 52-32 Keith Anderson (ON 1106), was one of 46 Arun-class All-weather lifeboats, commissioned by the Royal National Lifeboat Institution (RNLI), and operated around the coast of Great Britain and Ireland between 1971 and 2008.

The lifeboat served primarily at Newhaven Lifeboat Station, arriving in 1985, and serving for 14 years until 1999. The boat was withdrawn to the relief fleet in 1999, following the arrival of a new Severn-class lifeboat at Newhaven, but in 2000, she was assigned to Hartlepool Lifeboat Station, where she served for a further three years.

RNLB Keith Anderson was again withdrawn to the relief fleet in 2003, and finally sold from RNLI service in 2006. The boat was sold to the "China Rescue & Salvage Bureau", and would recommence her SAR service in Chinese waters, based in Dalian.

== History ==
The Keith Anderson was ordered to replace the Waveney-class All-weather lifeboat 44-019 Louis Marchesi of Round Table (ON 1045), which had served at Newhaven for eight years. This important East Sussex station needed an improved class of lifeboat to enhance the stations capabilities. The Arun-class was considered to be suitable for the mooring facilities on the River Ouse, which runs through the Port of Newhaven. She was laid down by VT Halmatic in 1984, and was later sent to William Osborne in Littlehampton to be fitted out. During spring 1985 she underwent her self-righting trials following which all her electronic equipment was installed and commissioned. The lifeboat arrived in Newhaven at the beginning of August, formally entering service on 9 August.

The first call-out occurred on her first day of service. At 06:45 on 9 August 1985, in near gale-force conditions, Keith Anderson departed Newhaven, to the aid of the yacht Nirvana, which was taking on water, and had a damaged rudder. The yacht was recovered to Brighton Marina, with the lifeboat returning to Newhaven at 09:20.

The lifeboat, which cost £394,928, was funded by the unusual gift of 17 items of jewellery from Mrs Esme Anderson of Grosvenor Square in London, for the provision of a lifeboat named in memory of her husband Keith Anderson. An emerald ring was valued at over £200,000, and other items included a £20,000 diamond tiara, a £10,000 diamond plume brooch, and a necklace valued at £40,000.

At a ceremony on Tuesday 27 May 1986, the new 52-foot Arun-class lifeboat was formally handed over by Mrs Esme Anderson, to The Duke of Atholl, chairman of the Institution, who in turn passed it to the care of Newhaven Lifeboat Station. In her address to the assembled crowd, Mrs Anderson said "that the event made her feel 10-feet tall". After a service of dedication by the Rev A. E. T. Hobbs, Vicar of Staplefield, Mrs Anderson showered the fore-deck with champagne, and named the lifeboat Keith Anderson, before being shown around the lifeboat, and taken on a short trip down the harbour.

By the time of this ceremony, which was held nearly 10 months after the lifeboat arrived on station, the lifeboat had already been launched to service on 33 occasions and had been accredited with saving the lives of four people.

== Relief fleet and Hartlepool ==
On the 27 October 1999, Newhaven received a new Severn-class All-weather lifeboat. After 14-years service, Keith Anderson (ON 1106) was withdrawn, and placed in the RNLI relief fleet, based at the RNLI headquarters at Poole in Dorset. This was a short-lived arrangement, as in October 2000, she was reassigned to Hartlepool Lifeboat Station, replacing the Tyne-class lifeboat 47-023 City of Sheffield (ON 1131). Keith Anderson remained at Hartlepool for the next three years, finally being replaced with a new Trent-class lifeboat.

== China SAR ==
Between 2003 and 2006, Keith Anderson was placed in storage at Poole. A deal was struck to send three Arun-class lifeboats to China, to join the China Ministry of Transport Rescue and Salvage organisation. The three lifeboats were loaded aboard a container ship at Felixstowe, and shipped to China. Once there the Chinese Rescue & Salvage Bureau placed her on station at the city of Dalian, a seaport in the south of Liaoning province, where she was renamed Hua Ying 394.

In all, a total of 10 Arun-class lifeboats were sold to China between 2005 and 2007. Details of their service are not available, and as of December 2025, just two seem to remain in operation. Nothing is known of the present location of ON 1106.
