= Newhaven Lifeboat Station =

RNLI lifeboat station in East Sussex, England

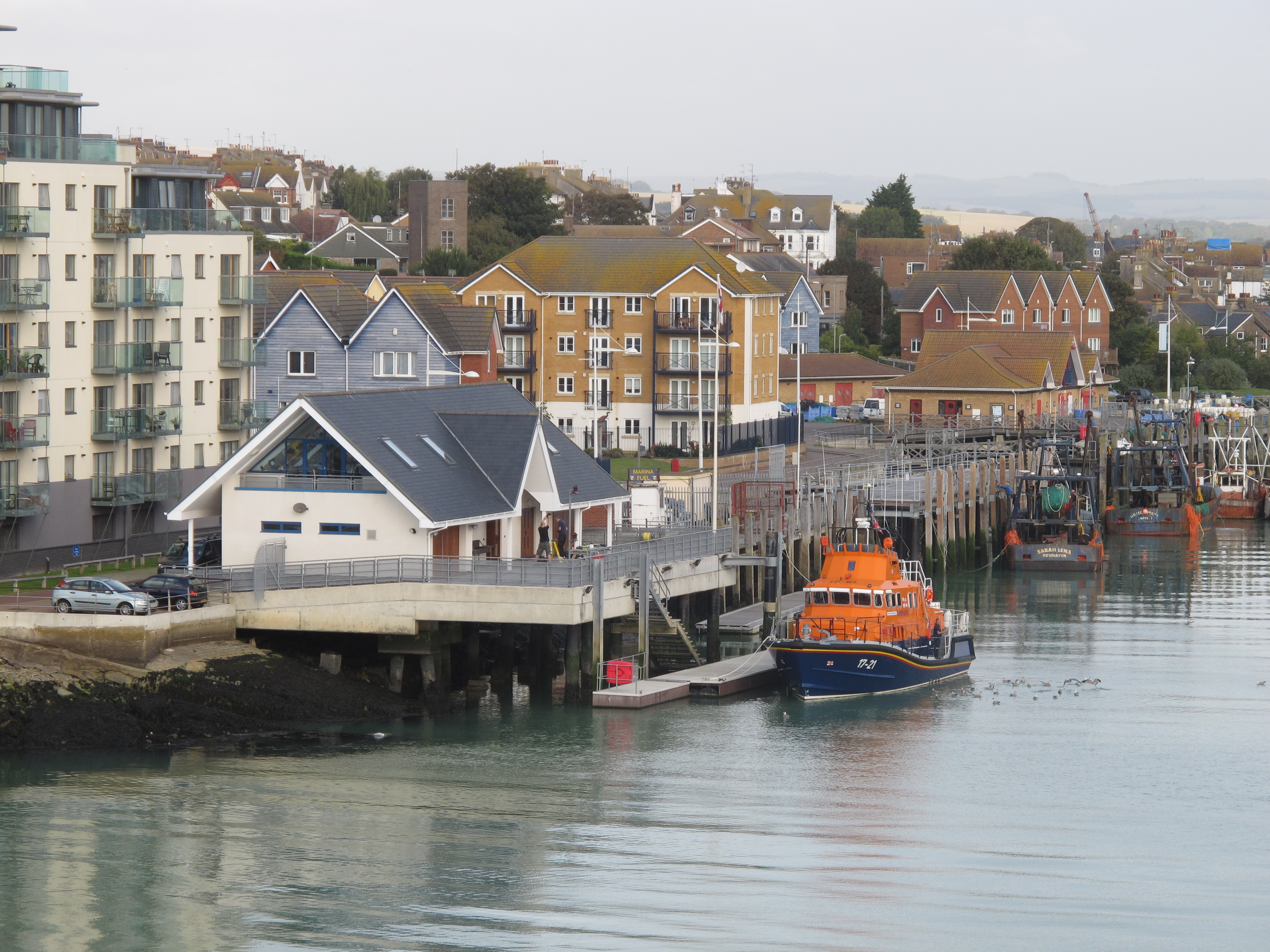
- Newhaven Lifeboat Station

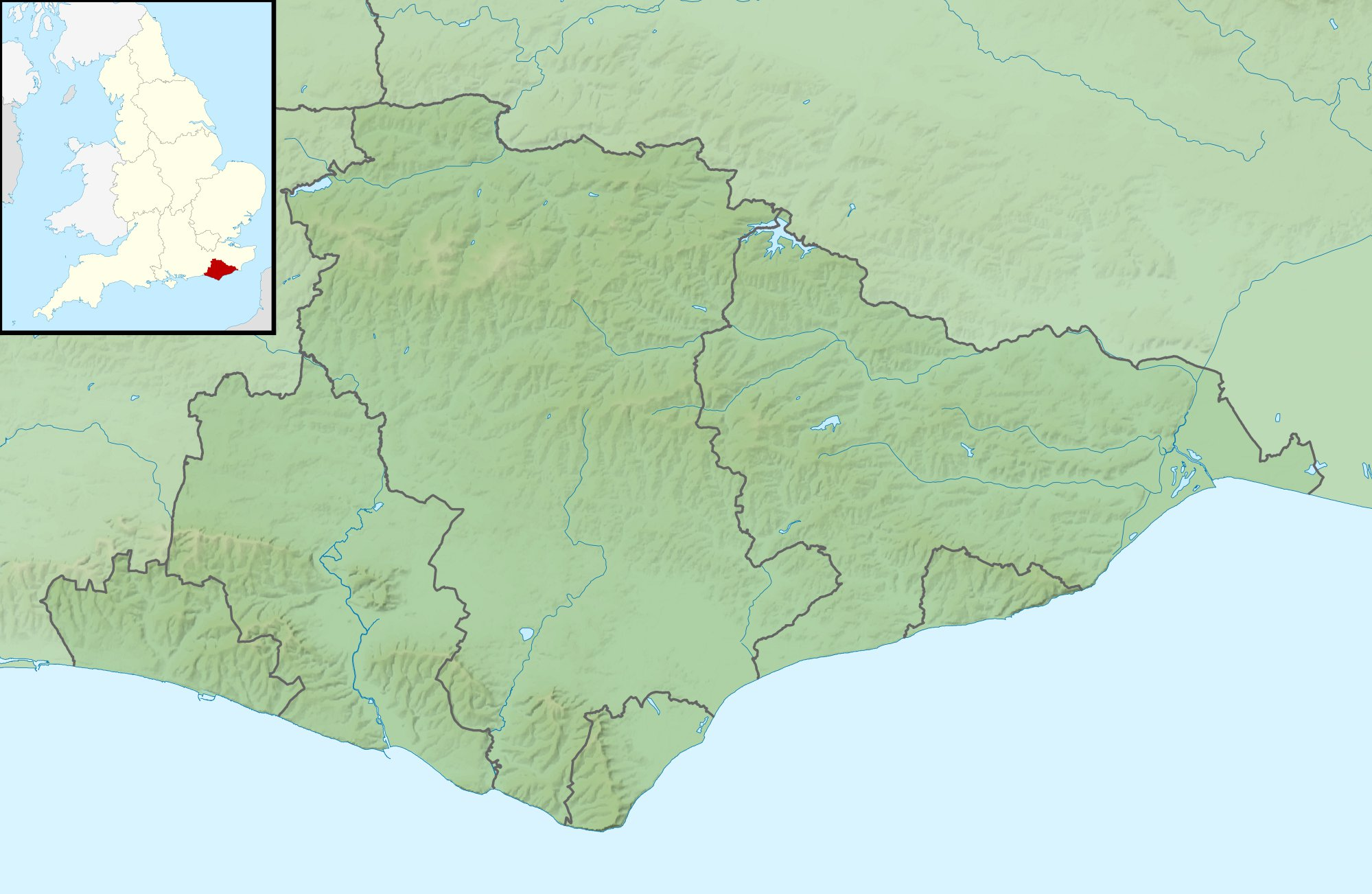
- Location within East Sussex

General information
- Type: RNLI lifeboat station
- Architectural style: Steel-frame boathouse built on stanchions with brick and block construction
- Location: West Quay,, Newhaven, East Sussex, BN9 9BX, England
- Coordinates: 50°47′19″N 0°03′13″E
- Opened: 1803–c.1831; 1852–present
- Owner: Royal National Lifeboat Institution

Website
- Newhaven RNLI Lifeboat Station

Newhaven Lifeboat Station is situated on the west bank of the River Ouse, in the port town of Newhaven in the English county of East Sussex, on the south coast of the United Kingdom. The Port of Newhaven is a busy commercial port with a ferry terminal, one of only two navigable harbours between the Isle of Wight to the west and Dover to the east. The harbour opens out onto the English Channel, one of the busiest stretches of waterway in the world.

A lifeboat station was established at Newhaven in 1803, operating until c.1831. The station was re-established by The Shipwrecked Fishermen and Mariners' Royal Benevolent Society (SFMRBS) in 1852, with management of the station being transferred to the Royal National Lifeboat Institution (RNLI) in December 1854.

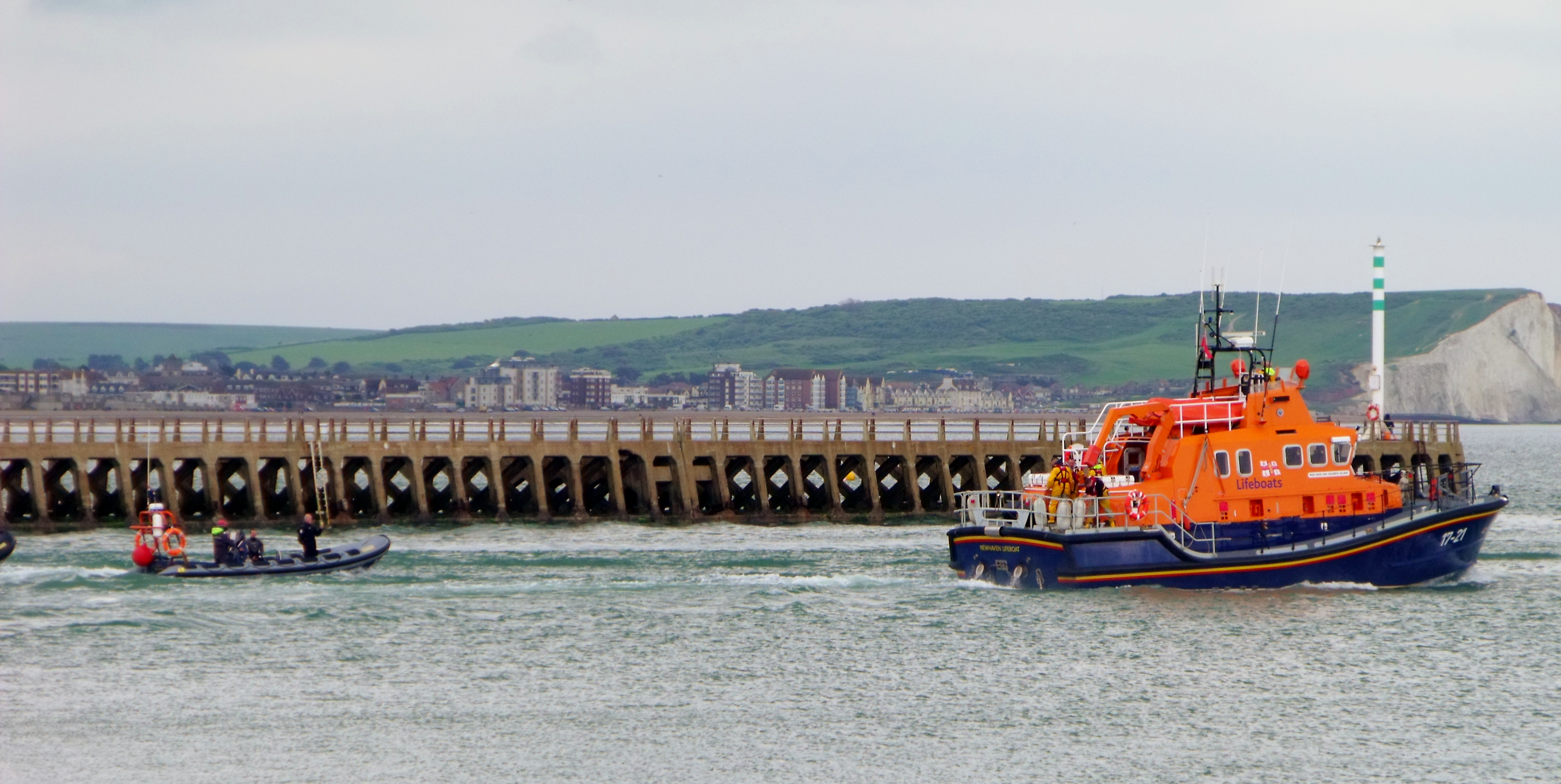
Severn-class All-weather lifeboat, 17-21 David and Elizabeth Acland (ON 1243) heading out on exercise, 2014

The station currently operates a Severn-class All-weather lifeboat, 17-21 David and Elizabeth Acland (ON 1243), on station since 1999, and a D-class (IB1) Inshore lifeboat, Elaine McLeod Scott (D-812), on station since 2024.

== History ==
Newhaven’s first lifeboat was established in 1803, when a lifeboat which had been built by Henry Greathead, the pioneering rescue lifeboat builder from South Shields, was placed on station in the town. The boat was 22-feet long, and was 6-oared. The lifeboat was funded partly by a donation from Lloyd's of London, and the rest from locally raised donations.

The lifeboat was one of 31 of this type built by Greathead, from his design of 1789 known as the Original. This type of lifeboat was designed to work in the shallow waters off the east coast of England, but in small and open harbours like Newhaven, the Greathead-class boats were not popular because of their weight and the large number of crew needed. This may have been the case at Newhaven, as no record can be found that the boat was ever launched to a service.

A second lifeboat was provided to the town in 1907, maybe named Adeline, the gift of Wm. B. Langridge of Lewis, and built by Christopher Wilson of London. It is thought that the boat remained in service until c.1831, although no service records are available. In 1809, the Greathead lifeboat was transferred to Brighton.

In 1825 the forerunner of the RNLI, the Royal National Institution for the Preservation of Life from Shipwreck (RNIPLS), supplied a lifeboat to the town. There was still no boathouse in the town, and so this lifeboat when not in use was stored out in the open under a tarpaulin. This boat was in service at the town until 1829, when it was removed to Cowes.

There are no records of any other Newhaven lifeboat until 1852, when Newhaven was provided with a lifeboat by The Shipwrecked Fishermen and Mariners' Royal Benevolent Society (SFMRBS). By 1854, the SFMRBS was involved in the management of eight lifeboat stations, Lytham, Rhyl, Portmadoc, Tenby, Llanelli, Teignmouth, Hornsea and Newhaven. An agreement was made between the SFMRBS and the RNLI, where the former would concentrate on the welfare of those rescued, whilst the latter would be involved in lifeboats, stations and rescues. Management of all eight stations was transferred to the RNLI on 7 December 1854.

The RNLI's first life boat at Newhaven arrived in 1863. It had previously been on service at Boulmer and Thorpeness, and was extended to 35-feet by Forrestt of Limehouse, London, and for Newhaven was renamed Thomas Chapman. However, she only served Newhaven for four years, performing just one service, but rescuing five crew.

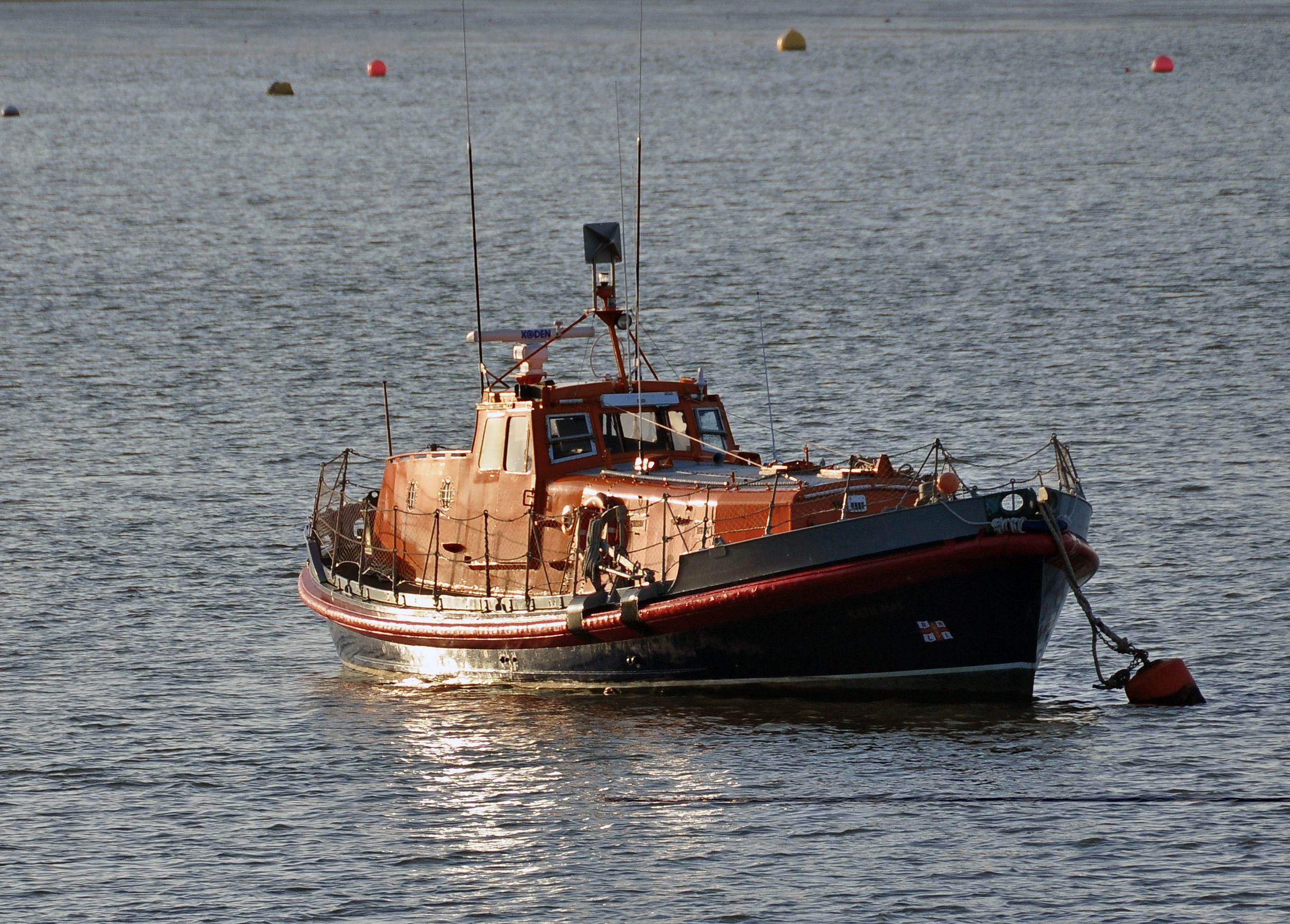
Former Newhaven lifeboat 47-foot Watson-class Kathleen Mary (ON 950)

A new boat arrived in 1867, a 33-foot self-righting lifeboat, also to be named Thomas Chapman, and built by Forrestt, costing £290-5s-0d. To house the new boat, Newhaven Lifeboat Station would finally get a boathouse, which was a brick built building on the west bank of the harbour, costing £471-8s-0d.

In 1904, Newhaven became the first lifeboat station to operate a motor-powered lifeboat, when former Folkestone lifeboat J McConnell Hussey (ON 343) was temporarily assigned for trials. It had been fitted with an 11-hp engine, giving a speed of nearly 6 knots. She served Newhaven for 5 months, before being transferred to Tynemouth for further trials, but it was much liked by the crew, who requested that their regular boat, now the Michael Henry (ON 407) be also fitted with an engine. This boat was sent to Thames Ironworks, with a reserve lifeboat being placed on station until the return of Michael Henry in 1907.

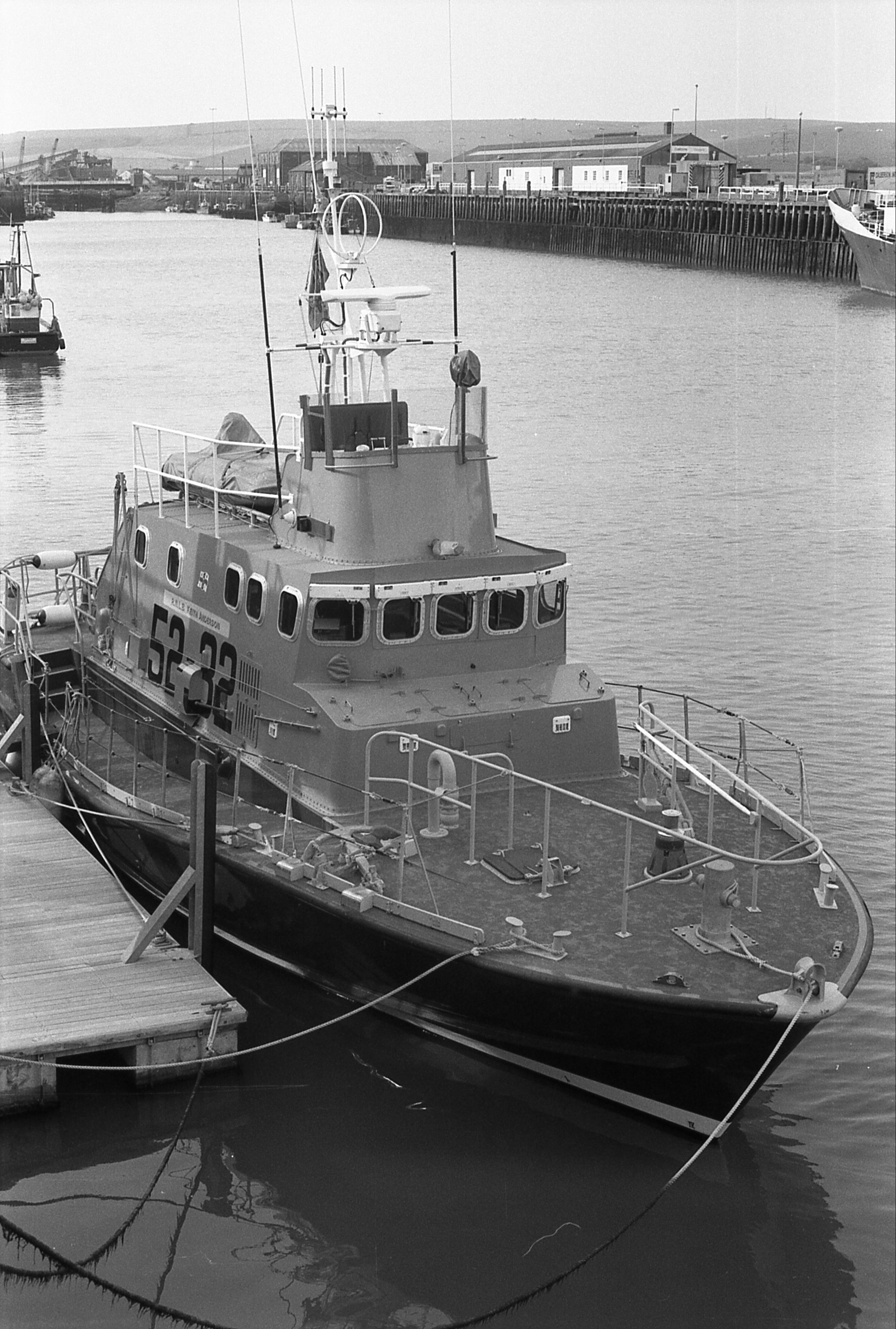
Arun-class 52-32 Keith Anderson (ON 1106)

In 1909, the lifeboat house was extensively modified, and a new slipway was constructed.

On 30 May 1940, the RNLI received a request from the Ministry of Shipping, to assemble as many lifeboats as possible at Dover within 24hrs. Newhaven Lifeboat Cecil and Lilian Philpott (ON 730) arrived in Dover the following morning. She was then used for the Dunkirk evacuation, making one trip and repatriating 51 men, finally arriving back on station on 11 June.

A new Arun-class lifeboat, 52-32 Keith Anderson (ON 1106) arrived on service at Newhaven in 1985. Built by Wm. Osbourne of Littlehampton and costing £415,000, she was funded from the auction of a collection of jewellery, donated by Mrs Esme Anderson in memory of her late husband. The monies raised would also fund a Trent-class lifeboat, 14-02 Esme Anderson (ON 1197), placed at Ramsgate.

In November 1999, Newhaven's current lifeboat arrived on station. Costing £1,725,000, she is the 25-knot Severn-class lifeboat 17-21 David and Elizabeth Acland (ON 1243).

== Station honours ==
The following are awards made at Newhaven:

- RNIPLS Silver Medal
  John Sullivan, Seaman – 1827
  Lt. James Rawstone, RN, H.M. Coastguard, Newhaven – 1833
  Lt. Samuel Grandy, RN, H.M. Coastguard, Newhaven – 1833
  Thomas Morgan, Commanding, Revenue Cutter Stork – 1833
  Lt. James Read, RN, H.M. Coastguard, Newhaven – 1833
  Abraham Hart Young, Chief Boatman, HM Coastguard, Blatchington – 1849
- RNLI Silver Medal
  Charles Leese, Gunner, Coast Brigade, RA – 1860
  Richard Payne, Coxswain – 1930
  Leonard Alfred John Peddlesden, Coxswain – 1944
  William James Harvey, Coxswain – 1955
- RNLI Bronze Medal
  Richard Payne, Coxswain – 1924
  C. J. Skinner, decorator – 1926
  Frederick Arthur Parker, Second Coxswain – 1944
  Richard William Lower, Mechanic – 1944
  Benjamin Jack Clark, Bowman / Signalman – 1944 (posthumous),
  Alfred James Eager, crew member – 1944
  Stephen Holden, crew member – 1944
  Harold Charles Moore, crew member – 1944
  Stanley Winter, crew member – 1944
- The Maud Smith Award 1954
  (for the bravest act of lifesaving during the year by a member of a lifeboat crew)
  William James Harvey, Coxswain – 1955
- A Framed Letter of Thanks signed by the Chairman of the Institution
  Leonard Patten, Coxswain – 1988
  Ian Johns, Coxswain – 2006
- A Gold Watch from The King of Denmark
  Richard Payne, Coxswain – 1929
- A Silver Goblet from The King of Denmark
  Each of the lifeboat crew – 1929
- Member, Order of the British Empire (MBE)
  Richard Kenneth Sayer, Honorary Secretary – 1969QBH
  Ian David Johns, Former Coxswain – 2012NYH
  Phillip Edwin Corsi, lately RNLI Area Operations Manager – 2026KBH
- Freeman of Newhaven
  Roger Cohen MBE, Lifeboat Operations Manager – 2025

== Roll of honour ==
In memory of those lost whilst serving Newhaven lifeboat:

- Died in 1910 from the effects of exposure, after a service on 3 December 1909
  Joseph Henry Richards (46)
- Died 3 June 1931, 18 months after injuries received on service to the Danish schooner Mogens Koch on 7 December 1929
  Richard Payne, Coxswain (57)
- Washed overboard and drowned, after a collision between the lifeboat Cecil and Lilian Philpott (ON 730) and H.M. Trawler Aventurine, 23 November 1943
  Benjamin Jack Clark, Bowman / Signalman (49)

== Newhaven lifeboats ==
=== Pulling and Sailing (P&S) lifeboats ===
ON (Note: ON is the RNLI's Official Number of the boat.)	Name	Built	On station	Class	Comments
–	Unnamed	1803	1803–1809	22-foot Greathead	(Note: 22-foot (8-oared) Greathead-class lifeboat, built by Henry Greathead of South Shields, costing £120.); Transferred to Brighton in 1809.
–	Adeline	1807	1807–????	Unknown	(Note: Lifeboat of unknown dimension, gift of Wm. B. Langridge of Lewes, built by Christopher Wilson of London.)
Pre-099	Unnamed	1824	1825–1829	18-foot Plenty Non-self-righting	(Note: 18-foot (4-oared) Plenty-class non-self-righting lifeboat, built by William Plenty of Newbury, Berkshire, costing £90.); Moved to Cowes in 1829 and laid up.
Pre-245	Friend in Need	1852	1852–1863	24-foot Beeching Self-righting (P&S)	(Note: 24-foot x 7-foot 3in (10-oared) Beeching self-righting (P&S) lifeboat, provided by the SFMRBS, built by James Beeching of Great Yarmouth, costing £125.); Condemned in 1863.
Pre-247	Thomas Chapman	1852	1863–1867	30-foot Beeching Self-righting (P&S)	(Note: 30-foot x 7-foot 9in (10-oared) Beeching self-righting (P&S) lifeboat, built by James Beeching of Great Yarmouth, extended 1862 to 35-foot x 8-foot 1in by Forrestt of Limehouse, London, costing £130 when new.); Previously Prudhoe at Boulmer and Thorpeness. Transferred to Fishguard.
Pre-485	Thomas Chapman	1867	1867–1870	33-foot Peake Self-righting (P&S)	(Note: 33-foot x 8-foot 7in (10-oared) self-righting (P&S) lifeboat, gift of an anonymous lady, built by Forrestt of Limehouse, London, costing £290.); Renamed Elizabeth Boys in 1870.
Pre-485	Elizabeth Boys	1867	1870–1877	33-foot Peake Self-righting (P&S)	(Note: Legacy of Mr T. Boys of Hove.); Broken up in 1879
Pre-571	Michael Henry	1877	1877–1881	37-foot Self-righting (P&S)	(Note: 37-foot x 8-foot 6in (12-oared) self-righting (P&S) lifeboat, gift of the Jewish Scholars LB fund, built by Forrestt of Limehouse, London, costing £393.); Returned to London.
211	Michael Henry	1881	1881–1897	37-foot Self-righting (P&S)	(Note: 37-foot x 9-foot (12-oared) self-righting (P&S) lifeboat, gift of the Jewish Scholars LB fund, built by Woolfe of Shadwell, London, costing £430.); Broken up, December 1897.
407	Michael Henry	1897	1897–1905	37-foot Self-righting (P&S)	(Note: 37-foot x 9-foot 3in (12-oared) self-righting (P&S) lifeboat, gift of the Jewish Scholars LB fund, built by Thames Ironworks of Blackwall, London, costing £728.); Withdrawn for motor-conversion in 1906, see below
265	Quiver No.1	1883	1905–1908	37-foot 2in Self-righting (P&S)	(Note: 37-foot x 9-foot (12-oared) self-righting (P&S) lifeboat, gift of The Quiver magazine LB fund, built by Woolfe of Shadwell, London, costing £430 when new.); Reserve lifeboat No. 3A. Previously at Margate, Wicklow, Watchet and The Mumbles. Placed in the relief fleet, then sold in 1913.

Pre ON numbers are unofficial numbers used by the Lifeboat Enthusiasts' Society to reference early lifeboats not included on the official RNLI list.

=== All-weather lifeboats ===
ON	Op.No. (Note: Op.No. is the RNLI's Operational Number of the boat carried on the hull.)	Name	Built	On station	Class	Comments
343	–	J. McConnel Hussey	1892	1904	38-foot Self-righting (Motor)	(Note: 38-foot x 8-foot self-righting lifeboat, gift of Miss Curling, built by Wm. T. Ellis of Lowestoft, costing £418 when new. Motor-conversion in 1903, single 11-hp Fay & Brown engine.); Reserve lifeboat No.2A. Previously at Folkestone. Motor conversion in 1903
407	–	Michael Henry	1897	1907–1912	37-foot Self-righting (Motor)	Returned to Newhaven following motor-conversion. Placed in the relief fleet, later at Dunmore East.
628	–	Sir Fitzroy Clayton	1912	1912–1918	38-foot Self-righting (Motor)	(Note: 38-foot x 8-foot self-righting lifeboat, with single 35-hp Tylor engine, built by Thames Ironworks of Blackwall, London, costing £3,081.); Lifeboat sent away for trials at The Lizard.
Station Closed 1918–1919
628	–	Sir Fitzroy Clayton	1912	1919–1930	38-foot Self-righting (Motor)	Placed in the relief fleet. Later at Fleetwood.
730	–	Cecil and Lilian Philpott	1930	1930–1959	45-foot 6in Watson	
950	–	Kathleen Mary	1959	1959–1977	47-foot Watson	Last slipway launched boat
1045	44-019	Louis Marchesi of Round Table	1977	1977–1985	Waveney	
1106	52-32	Keith Anderson	1985	1985–1999	Arun	
1243	17-21	David and Elizabeth Acland	1999	1999–	Severn	

:More post-service details can be found on the respective lifeboat class pages.

=== Inshore lifeboats ===
Op.No.	Name	On station	Class	Comments
D-774	Arthur Hamilton	2022–2024	D-class (IB1)	
D-812	Elaine McLeod Scott	2024–	D-class (IB1)	

== See also ==
- List of RNLI stations
- List of former RNLI stations
- Royal National Lifeboat Institution lifeboats
