= Boulmer Lifeboat Station =

Independent lifeboat station in Northumberland, England

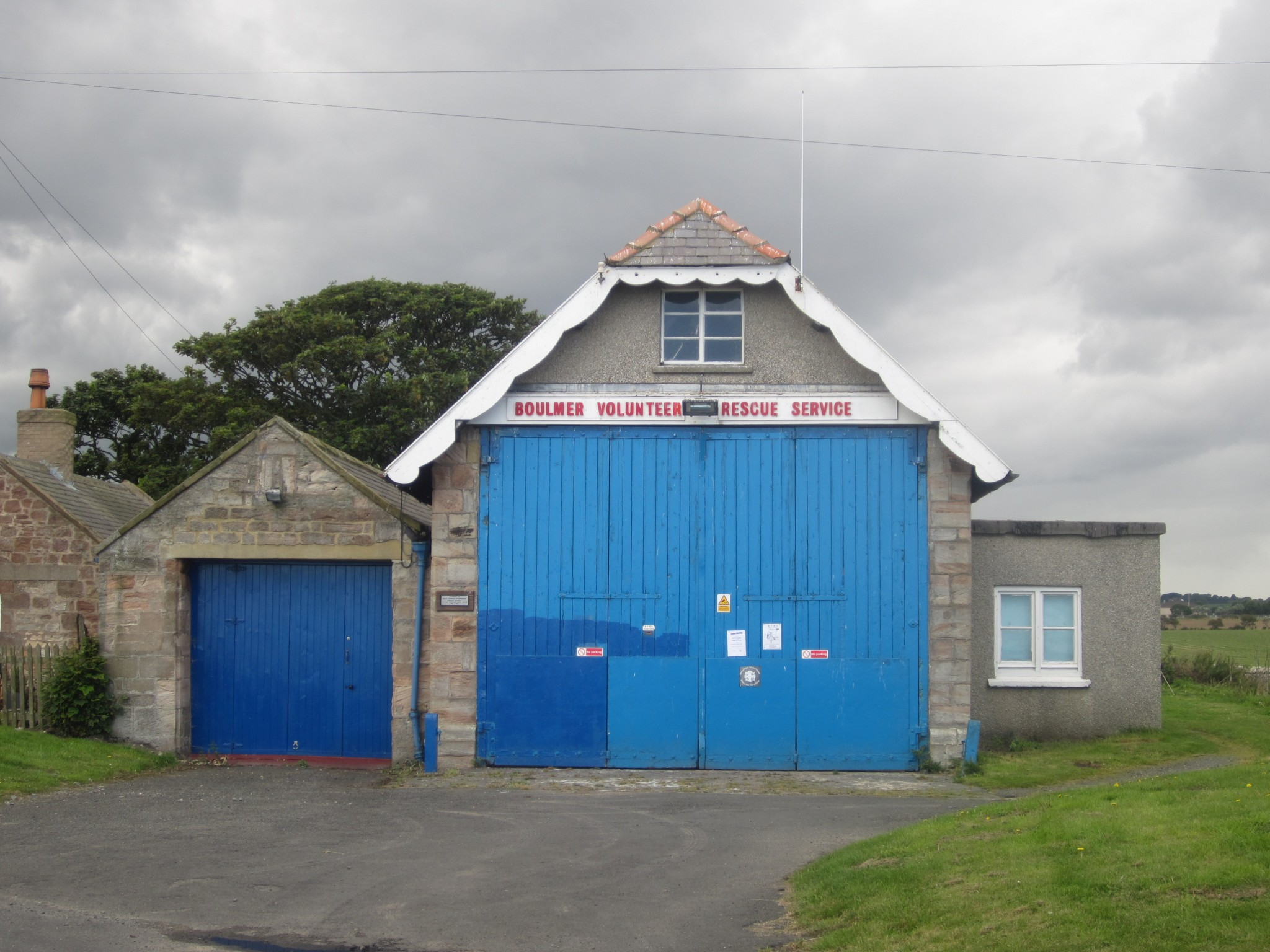
- Boulmer Lifeboat House now Boulmer Volunteer Rescue Service.

- Location within Northumberland

General information
- Type: Lifeboat Station
- Location: The Lifeboat House, Beach View, Boulmer, Alnwick, Northumberland, NE66 3BN, England
- Coordinates: 55°25′12.0″N 1°34′56.0″W
- Opened: 1825–1853 NSA; 1853–1854 RNIPLS; 1854–1969 RNLI; 1969–present BVRS

Website
- Boulmer Volunteer Rescue Service

Boulmer Lifeboat Station is located in Boulmer, a village which sits mid-way between Berwick-upon-Tweed, and Newcastle-upon-Tyne, and approximately 5 miles (8.0 km) due east of Alnwick, in the county of Northumberland.

A lifeboat, provided by the Royal National Institution for the Preservation of Life from Shipwreck (RNIPLS), was stationed at Boulmer in 1825, operated by the Newcastle Shipwreck Association (NSA). Management of the station was transferred to the RNIPLS in 1853, which became the Royal National Lifeboat Institution (RNLI) the following year in 1854.

After operating for 143 years, the RNLI station was closed in 1968, but an Independent service, Boulmer Volunteer Rescue Service, was established in 1969. The service still operates today.

== History ==
A station was opened at Boulmer in 1825 under the management of the Newcastle Shipwreck Association (NSA), following a request by Mr. William Clarke to the (RNIPLS) for a lifeboat. A 32-foot stone-built boathouse was constructed by the NSA, and a lifeboat was duly provided, a 27-foot 6in 10-oared North Country, or "Greathead", type lifeboat, built by Thomas Wake of Sunderland.

This first Boulmer lifeboat would serve 27 years, and save 32 lives. On 2 November 1844, the Boulmer lifeboat made three trips to the wreck of the Iris and rescued eight men. Lt. John Brunton, RN, of H.M. Coastguard, was awarded the RNIPLS Silver Medal.

In 1851, the Boulmer boat was reported as being in poor condition, and a request was made of the RNIPLS to provide a replacement. A 30-foot self-righting 'Pulling and Sailing' (P&S) lifeboat, one with sails and (10) oars, costing £130, and built by James Beeching of Great Yarmouth, was provided. It was funded by Algernon Percy, 4th Duke of Northumberland, and was named Prudhoe, the Duke having formerly been known as Lord Prudhoe.

In 1853, Boulmer Lifeboat Station would be transferred to the management of the RNIPLS, which became the RNLI the following year.

The first Prudhoe didn't serve long at Boulmer. The boat was disliked by the crew, and a replacement was requested. Whether the boat was no good is up for speculation. It capsized when being towed back to Newcastle, but then went on to serve at Thorpeness, Newhaven and Fishguard, remaining in service until 1885. A new 30-foot 10-oared self-righting lifeboat was supplied by Forrestt of Limehouse, London, arriving in Boulmer on 30 November 1854. This time costing £150, it was once again funded by the Duke of Northumberland, and was again named Prudhoe.

On 13 March 1913, in a severe gale, heavy seas, and dense fog, the French steam trawler Tadorne of Boulogne, with 30 crew, ran aground near Howick Haven. Three men tried to make shore in the ships boat, but two were drowned. The rest of the crew clung to the rigging, as large waves crashed over the boat. On surveying the scene, Albert Grey, 4th Earl Grey, of nearby Howick Hall, dispatched a messenger to raise the Boulmer lifeboat. After an extraordinary effort, and two trips, the Boulmer lifeboat managed to save 25 men off the trawler. Coxswain William Stephenson was awarded a Gold Medal from the French government, the RNLI Silver Medal, and two awards from the French Lifeboat Service, Societe Hospitaliers Sauveteurs Bretons. The wreck of the steam engine is still visible today.

A Clayton launch and recovery tractor was trialled at Boulmer in 1922, but with little success. An article in "The Lifeboat" magazine of 1926 highlighted that some 115 people of the village Boulmer, around 80% of the population, could be involved in the launch of the lifeboat. As a result, the women lifeboat launchers were awarded "The Thanks of the Institution inscribed on Vellum".

In 1927, another Clayton launch tractor was placed at Boulmer, but a larger more powerful FWD Ltd tractor, T23, was trialled in 1928. The lifeboat and carriage were hauled 0.5 mi (0.80 km) across mud, and then 150 yards out to sea, launching in just 24 minutes, proving the tractor a great success. The FWD tractor T26 was placed on service in 1930.

Soon afterwards followed a motor-powered lifeboat. L. P. and St. Helen (ON 703), a 35-foot 6in self-righting motor lifeboat built by S.E. Saunders of Cowes, arrived in Boulmer in 1931, so named after her benefactors, Miss Ann Lovelock, Mr A. H. Pett, and Miss Helen Turner,

In 1967, it was decided to withdraw the All-weather lifeboat from Boulmer. The boat was formally withdrawn on 31 March 1968, replaced on 1 April with an Inshore D-class (D-100) lifeboat on station for a 1-year trial. With only two service launches, and no lives saved, the D-class was also withdrawn, at the end of the summer season. After 143 years of service, 199 service launches, and with 236 lives saved, Boulmer lifeboat station closed in 1968.

The closure of this well established station provoked an outcry from the local community. A fundraising campaign was started, and the Independent Boulmer Volunteer Rescue Service was established in 1969. The former RNLI boathouse was given over to the rescue service, which is still in operation to this day.

For further information on the current rescue service, please see the website link.

== Station honours ==
The following are awards made at Boulmer.

- Gold Medal, awarded by the French Government
  William Stephenson, Coxswain – 1913
- RNIPLS Silver Medal
  Lt. John Brunton, RN, H.M. Coastguard – 1844
- RNLI Silver Medal
  Bartholomew Stephenson, Coxswain – 1866
  William Stephenson, Coxswain – 1913
- RNLI Bronze Medal
  Bartholomew Stephenson Stanton, Coxswain – 1933
  James Campbell, Coxswain – 1941
- Medals (2 Services), awarded by the Societe Hospitaliers Sauveteurs Bretons
  William Stephenson, Coxswain – 1913
- The Thanks of the Institution inscribed on Vellum
  The Women Lifeboat Launchers – 1926

== Roll of honour ==
In memory of those lost whilst serving Boulmer lifeboat.

- Suffered a stroke assisting the launch of the lifeboat to the schooner Caecilie of Hamburg on 6 March 1908, and died in 1912.
  James Straker Stanton, Assistant Coxswain (50)

== Boulmer lifeboats ==
=== Pulling and Sailing (P&S) lifeboats ===
ON (Note: ON is the RNLI's Official Number of the boat.)	Name	Built	On station	Class	Comments
Pre-101	Unnamed	1825	1825−1852	27-foot North Country	(Note: 27-foot x 8-foot 6in (10-oared) North Country non-self-righting lifeboat, built by Thomas Wake of Sunderland, costing £150.)
Pre-247	Prudhoe	1852	1852−1854	30-foot Beeching Self-righting (P&S)	(Note: 30-foot x 7-foot 9in (10-oared) Beeching-class self-righting (P&S) lifeboat, built by James Beeching of Great Yarmouth, costing £130.)
Pre-286	Prudhoe	1854	1854−1867	30-foot Peake Self-righting (P&S)	(Note: 30-foot x 7-foot 6in (10-oared) Peake-class self-righting (P&S) lifeboat, gift of Algernon Percy, 4th Duke of Northumberland, built by Forrestt of Limehouse, London, costing £150.)
209	Robin Hood of Nottingham	1866	1867−1892	33-foot Peake Self-righting (P&S)	(Note: 33-foot x 8-foot 1in (10-oared) Peake-class self-righting (P&S) lifeboat, gift of Mr Grimson and citizens of Nottingham, built by Forrestt of Limehouse, London, costing £289.)
338	Meliscent	1892	1892−1911	34-foot Self-righting (P&S)	(Note: 34-foot x 8-foot (10-oared) self-righting (P&S) lifeboat, legacy of Miss M. Fielder of London, built by Forrestt of Limehouse, London, costing £390.)
619	Meliscent	1911	1911−1912	35-foot Rubie Self-righting (P&S)	(Note: 35-foot x 8-foot 10in (10-oared) Rubie self-righting (P&S) lifeboat, gift of Miss M. Fielder of London, built by Thames Ironworks of Blackwall, London, costing £989.); Renamed Arthur R. Dawes in 1912.
619	Arthur R. Dawes	1911	1912−1931	35-foot Rubie Self-righting (P&S)	(Note: Legacy of Mr G. R. Dawes of London)

Pre ON numbers are unofficial numbers used by the Lifeboat Enthusiasts' Society, to reference early lifeboats not included on the official RNLI list.

=== Motor lifeboats ===
ON	Op. No. (Note: Op. No. is the RNLI's Operational Number of the boat carried on the hull or vehicle.)	Name	Built	On station	Class	Comments
703	–	L. P. and St. Helen	1927	1931−1937	35-foot 6in Self-righting (motor)	
793	–	Clarissa Langdon	1937	1937−1962	Liverpool	
966	37-04	Robert and Dorothy Hardcastle	1962	1962−1968	Oakley	

=== Inshore lifeboats ===
Op. No.	Name	On station	Class	Comments
D-100	Unnamed	1968	D-class (RFD PB16)	

=== Launch and recovery tractors ===
Op. No.	Reg. No.	Type	On station	Comments
T2	AH 5933	Clayton	1922	
T19	TY 2547	Clayton	1927–1930	
T26	UW 3882	FWD Co.	1930–1954	
T61	PLA 561	Fowler Challenger III	1954–1966	
T57	NYE 351	Fowler Challenger III	1966–1968	

== See also ==
- List of RNLI stations
- List of former RNLI stations
- Independent lifeboats in Britain and Ireland
- Royal National Lifeboat Institution lifeboats
