= Boulmer =

Village in Northumberland, England

Coordinates: 55.424°N 1.583°W

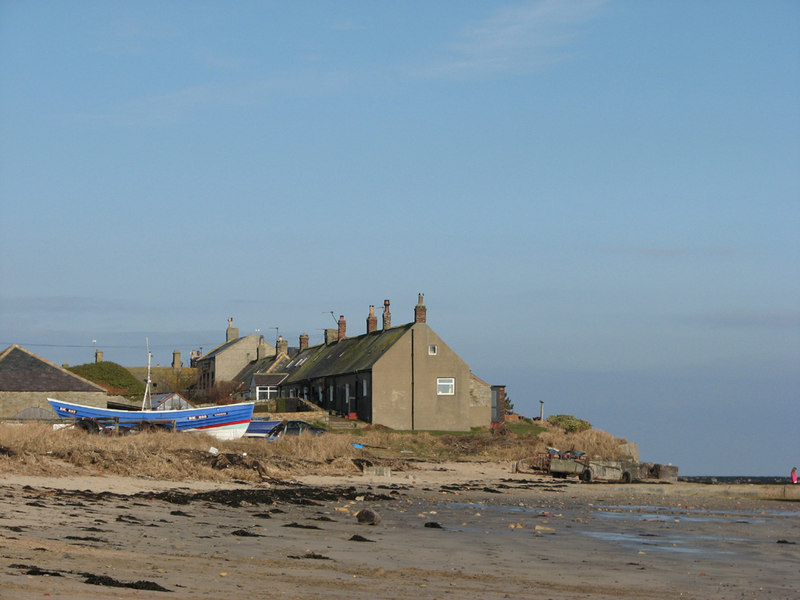
- Boulmer beach

- Location within Northumberland
- OS grid reference: NU265145
- Unitary authority: Northumberland
- Ceremonial county: Northumberland
- Region: North East
- Country: England
- Sovereign state: United Kingdom
- Post town: ALNWICK
- Postcode district: NE66
- Dialling code: 01665
- Police: Northumbria
- Fire: Northumberland
- Ambulance: North East
- UK Parliament: North Northumberland

Boulmer /ˈbuːmər/ is a village in Northumberland, England, on the North Sea coast east of Alnwick. It is home to RAF Boulmer. Boulmer has an independent volunteer lifeboat station.

== Origin of the name ==
The name Boulmer, pronounced "Boomer", is a derivation of Bulemer, from the old English bulan-mere (bulls mere).

== History ==
Boulmer was notorious for its smuggling activities, much of which was centred on the Fishing Boat Inn. In the 18th century, one of the most well-known smugglers, King of the Gypsies William Faa, lived some 35 miles away in the remote Scottish village of Kirk Yetholm. In the 18th and 19th centuries, the village was the smuggling capital of Northumberland.

The Annual Report of the Fishery Board for Scotland provides an insight into fishing from Boulmer in the years before the First World War.

Fishery Statistics

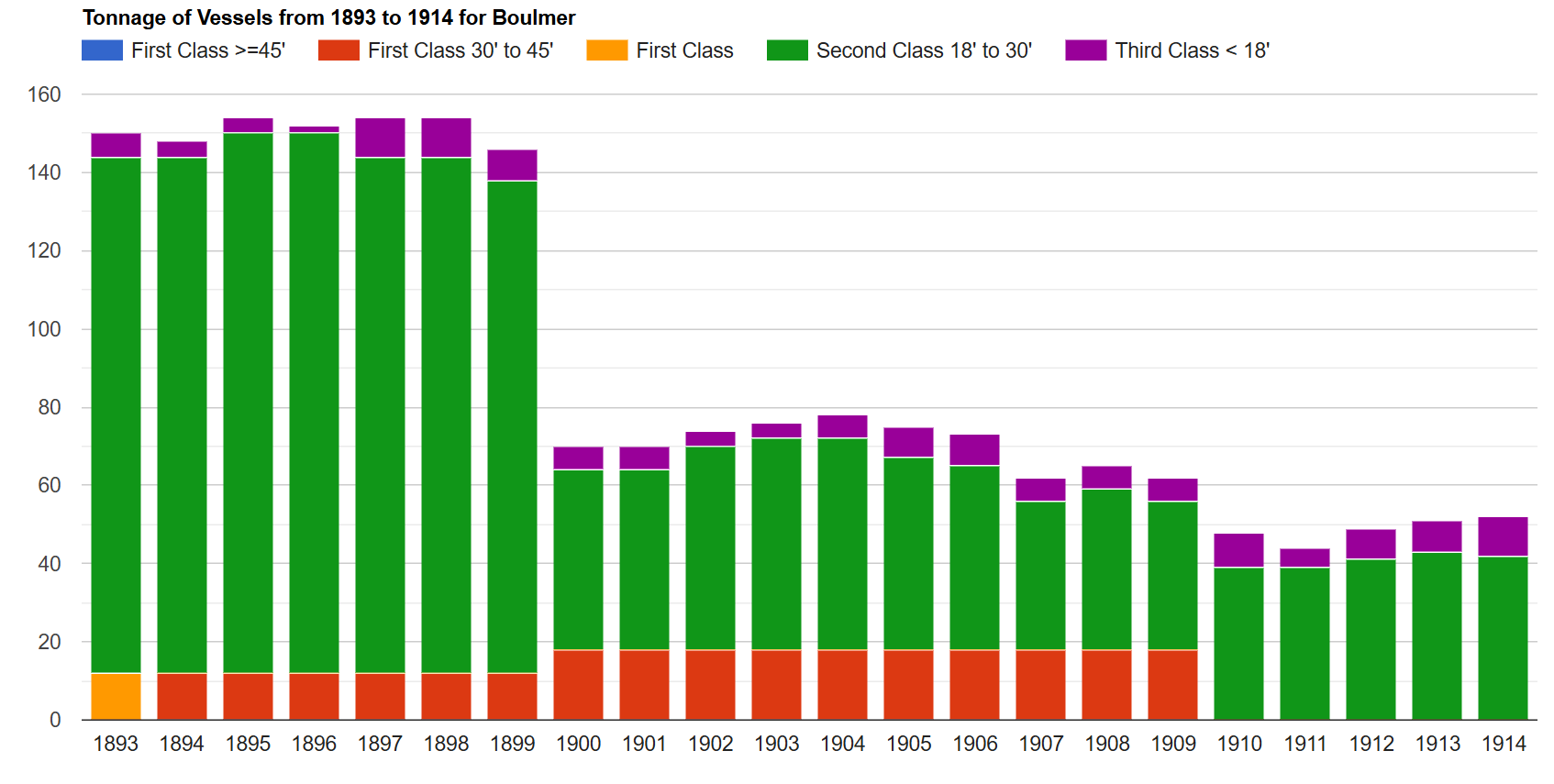
Tonnage of vessels

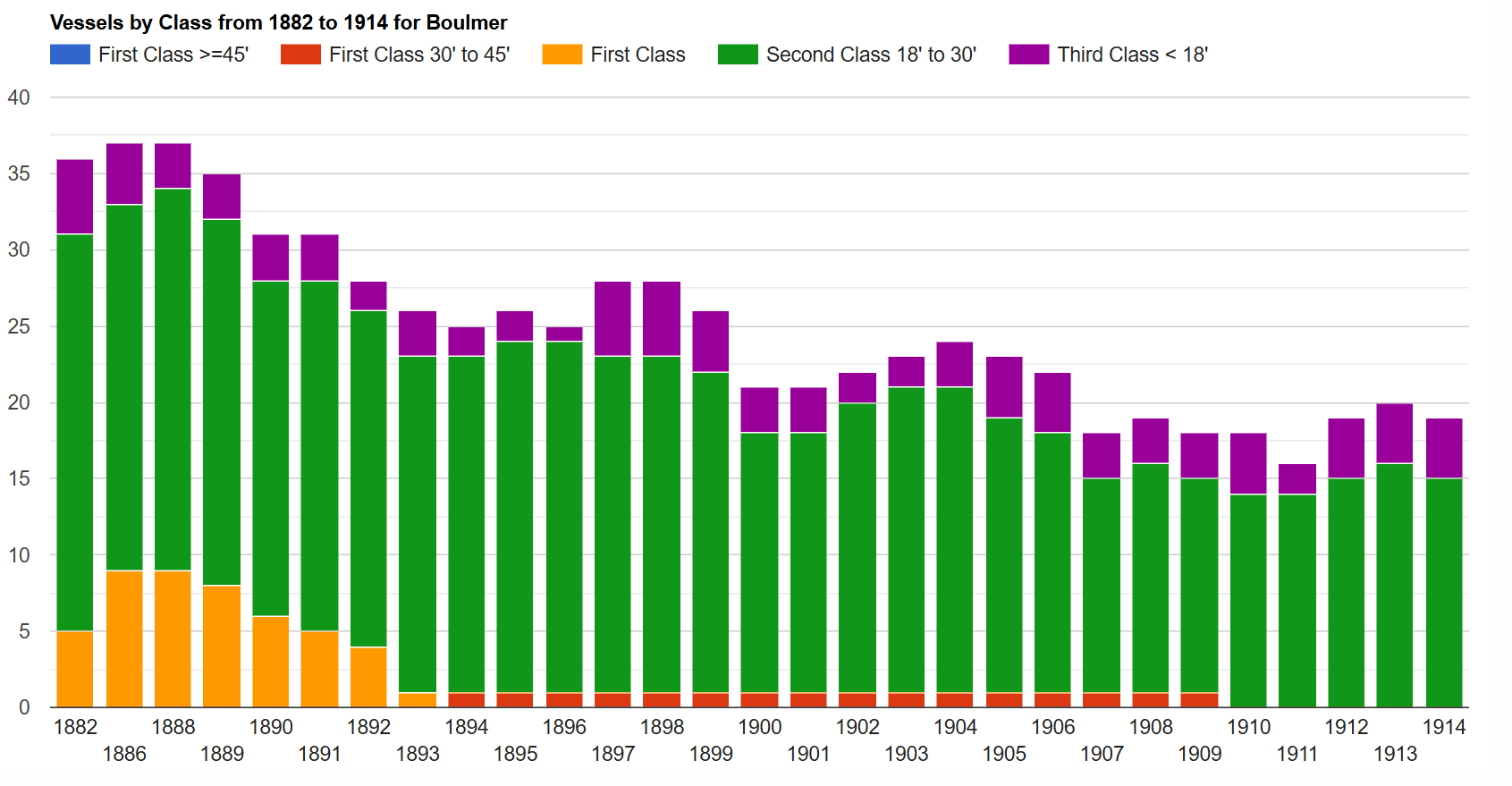
Vessels by class

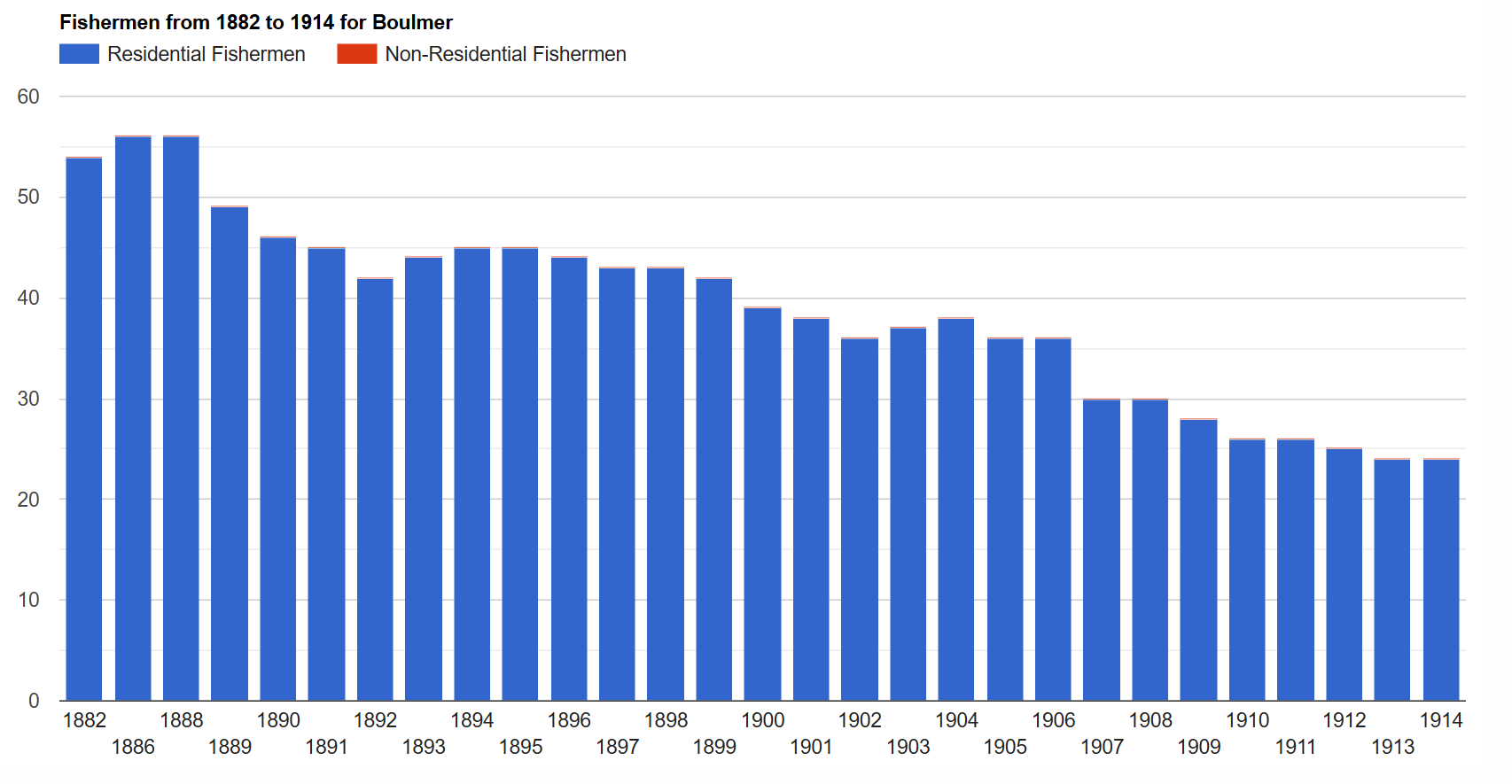
Fishermen

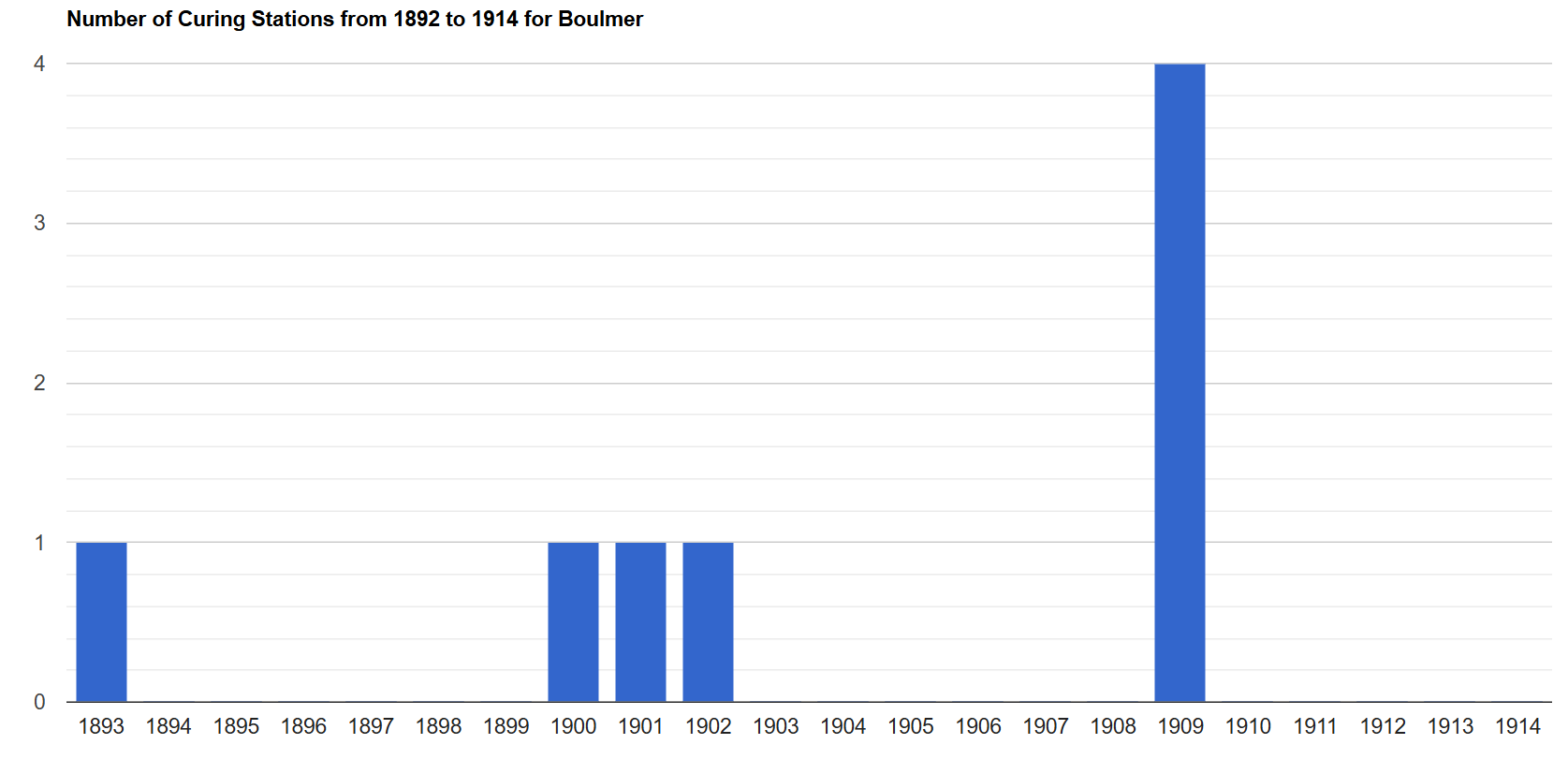
Number of curing stations

A major change was the arrival of the Royal Air Force in World War 2. Otherwise, Boulmer has changed little in over 100 years and is one of the few true traditional fishing villages left on the Northumberland coast.

== Today ==
The village consists of a row of cottages and the pub. Set within a natural haven, in a gap through an almost complete band of rock, Boulmer has no harbour.

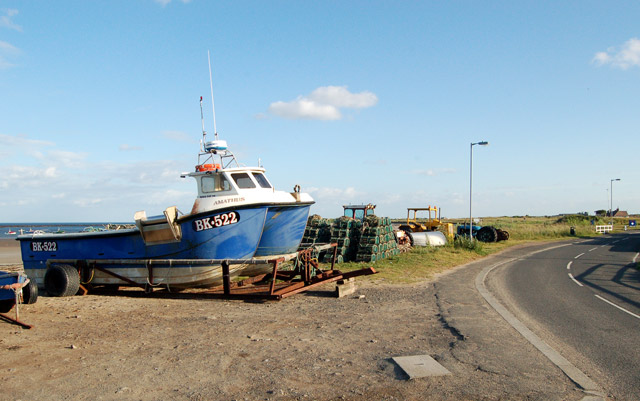
Hauled-up fishing boat and lobster pots

=== Fishing ===
Traditional blue fishing cobles are hauled ashore or moored in the water. The main catch is crab, lobster and sea salmon.

=== Filming location ===
In the spring and summer of 2004, much of the filming for the ITV comedy-drama series Distant Shores was carried out at various locations along the Northumberland coast. Boulmer is featured in many scenes, including "Hildasay" Ferry and various settings depicted both inside and outside the cottages, including the beach and sand dunes, and the nearby countryside where the fictional new doctor's surgery was built. In 2021, Boulmer was a location for the ITV crime-drama series Vera.

=== Lifeboat ===
A lifeboat, provided by the Royal National Institute for the Preservation of Life from Shipwreck (RNIPLS), was first stationed here in 1825, managed by the Newcastle Shipwreck Association (NSA). In 1853, full control of Boulmer Lifeboat Station passed to the RNIPLS, which then became the Royal National Lifeboat Institution (RNLI) in 1854.

In 1967, the RNLI decided to withdraw the All-weather lifeboat from Boulmer. The boat was formally withdrawn on 31 March 1968, replaced on 1 April 1968 with an Inshore D-class lifeboat, placed on station for the summer of 1968, before it too was withdrawn. After 143 years of service, 199 service launches, and with 236 lives saved, Boulmer RNLI lifeboat station closed at the end of 1968.

In 1969, the local community decided to buy their own private lifeboat, and the Boulmer Volunteer Rescue Service was founded. The original lifeboat house was gifted to the new organisation. It is now an independent lifeboat service, but currently only operates during daylight hours, weekends and on bank holidays, due to low crew numbers and limited sea-traffic.

Lifeboat	In service	Class	Comments
Sea Hunter	1969−1997		
Duchess Elizabeth	1997−	9.35m Alnmaritec Waterjet	
Pentland Knight	−	9m Tornado RHIB	
Boulmer Haven	2016−	5.5m Tornado RHIB	

== Climate ==
Climate data for Boulmer, elevation: 23 m (75 ft), 1991–2020 normals, extremes 1975–present
Month	Jan	Feb	Mar	Apr	May	Jun	Jul	Aug	Sep	Oct	Nov	Dec	Year
Record high °C (°F)	15.2 (59.4)	17.5 (63.5)	21.1 (70.0)	21.0 (69.8)	24.8 (76.6)	27.7 (81.9)	30.5 (86.9)	28.2 (82.8)	25.2 (77.4)	23.4 (74.1)	17.9 (64.2)	16.5 (61.7)	30.5 (86.9)
Mean daily maximum °C (°F)	7.3 (45.1)	7.8 (46.0)	9.3 (48.7)	11.2 (52.2)	13.7 (56.7)	16.4 (61.5)	18.7 (65.7)	18.6 (65.5)	16.5 (61.7)	13.3 (55.9)	9.9 (49.8)	7.6 (45.7)	12.6 (54.7)
Daily mean °C (°F)	4.6 (40.3)	5.0 (41.0)	6.1 (43.0)	7.8 (46.0)	10.3 (50.5)	12.9 (55.2)	15.0 (59.0)	15.0 (59.0)	13.2 (55.8)	10.3 (50.5)	7.1 (44.8)	4.9 (40.8)	9.4 (48.9)
Mean daily minimum °C (°F)	2.0 (35.6)	2.1 (35.8)	2.9 (37.2)	4.5 (40.1)	6.8 (44.2)	9.5 (49.1)	11.4 (52.5)	11.4 (52.5)	9.8 (49.6)	7.4 (45.3)	4.4 (39.9)	2.2 (36.0)	6.2 (43.2)
Record low °C (°F)	−12.3 (9.9)	−9.2 (15.4)	−8.2 (17.2)	−2.8 (27.0)	−1.0 (30.2)	2.6 (36.7)	4.9 (40.8)	3.7 (38.7)	1.6 (34.9)	−2.7 (27.1)	−8.9 (16.0)	−12.1 (10.2)	−12.3 (9.9)
Average precipitation mm (inches)	57.3 (2.26)	47.8 (1.88)	43.7 (1.72)	49.6 (1.95)	42.5 (1.67)	63.7 (2.51)	63.7 (2.51)	67.8 (2.67)	52.9 (2.08)	72.2 (2.84)	81.3 (3.20)	65.2 (2.57)	707.7 (27.86)
Average precipitation days (≥ 1.0 mm)	11.8	10.1	8.8	8.9	8.7	10.1	10.4	10.5	9.3	12.2	12.9	11.5	125.2
Mean monthly sunshine hours	63.7	87.4	128.6	167.7	209.8	192.2	188.4	174.2	140.0	104.6	73.3	58.4	1,588.4
Source 1: Met Office
Source 2: Starlings Roost Weather

== Governance ==
Boulmer is in the parliamentary constituency of Berwick-upon-Tweed.

== See also ==
- List of former RNLI stations
- Independent lifeboats (British Isles)
- Bulmer, North Yorkshire
