= The British Four-wheel Drive Tractor Lorry Super Engineering Company =

Engineering company in Slough, United Kingdom

The British Four-wheel Drive Tractor Lorry Super Engineering Company was an engineering company based in Slough (Berkshire, England) during the 1920s. It was the UK-based subsidiary of the Four Wheel Drive which had been founded in 1909 in Clintonville, Wisconsin by Otto Zachow and William Besserdich.

The UK subsidiary was formed by Henry Nyberg and Chares Cleaver and operated from premises on the Slough Trading Estate.

In 1922 they supplied a 4-wheel rail lorry to the Derwent Valley Light Railway which was located in Yorkshire. The lorry was unsuccessful struggling with heavy loads and was returned to its manufacturer. Other lorries were sold, one operating at Dinorwic Quarry for many years.

Later in the 1920s the company was recorded as building half-tracks for military use and by 1929 was marketing a lorry.

The company did not seem to get sufficient support from the parent so on 15 October 1929 they entered into an agreement with the Associated Equipment Company (AEC) and on 31 October 1929 a new company called 4-wheel Drive Motors Limited was formed with the major shareholder being the Underground Electric Railways Company of London Limited with Nyberg and Cleaver holding the remaining shares.
