= Great Gale of 1871 =

1871 storm in North East England

The Great Gale of 1871 was a severe storm in the North Sea which struck the north east coast of England on Friday 10 February 1871.

Shipping near the town of Bridlington was severely affected by the storm, and, in an attempt to rescue seamen, the RNLI lifeboat RNLB Robert Whitworth was put out of action and the fishermans lifeboat Harbinger upturned with nine locals on board, killing six of them.

A memorial obelisk in Bridlington Priory Churchyard commemorates 43 burials there.

28 ships were wrecked on the north east coast, and total fatalities are estimated at over 50.

== Ships Lost ==
The Arrow of Sunderland

The Caroline of Yarmouth

The Delta of Whitby

The John of Whitstable

The Lavina of Seaham

The Margaret of Ipswich

The Produce of Folkestone

The Teresita of Harwich

The William Maitland of Whitby

1 Unknown English Schooner.

13 Other Vessels

== Crew of the Fisherman's Lifeboat Harbinger ==
- Robert Pickering
- John Clappison
- Richard Atkin
- James Watson
- David Purdon
- William Cobb

== See also ==
- List of United Kingdom disasters by death toll
